= List of de Havilland Canada DHC-6 Twin Otter operators =

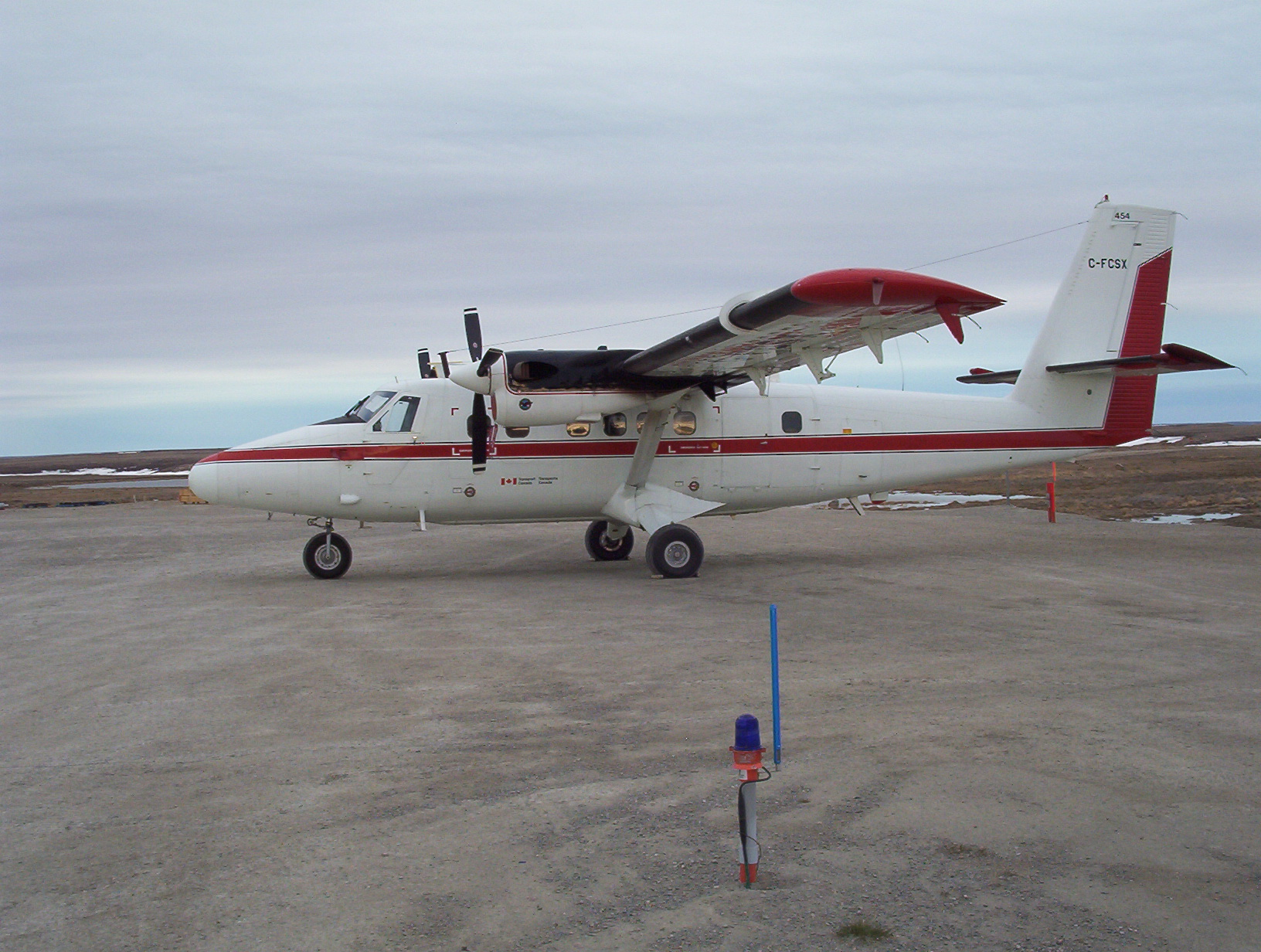
- A Canadian Government Twin Otter in 2005

The Twin Otter was and is used by dozens of airlines and militaries around the world, and was produced in three main series (100, 200, 300) until 1988.

As of 2006, over 40 years after design and manufacturing work on the original DHC-6 began, more than 500 of this aircraft were still flying. In that year Viking Air purchased the type certificate for the DHC-6 and announced its intention to offer a new build Series 400 Twin Otter.

== Current civil operators ==
In 2016, there were 281 Twin Otters in airline service with 26 new aircraft on order: 112 in North/South America, 106 in Asia Pacific & Middle East (16 orders), 38 in Europe (10 orders) and 25 in Africa.

A total of 270 Twin Otters were in airline service in 2018, and 14 on order: 111 in North/South America, 117 in the Asia-Pacific and Middle East (14 orders), 26 in Europe and 13 in Africa.

In 2020, there were a total of 315 Twin Otters worldwide with 220 in service, 95 in storage and 8 on order. By region there were 22 in Africa, 142 in Asia Pacific (8 orders), 37 in Europe, 4 in the Middle East and 110 in the Americas.

As of February 2023, there were 108 Twin Otters registered in Canada.

Aircraft 2020
Operator	Total	In service	In storage	Orders	Country
AeroGeo	8	0	8		Russia
Aerolínea de Antioquia	1	0	1		Colombia
Aerovías DAP	1	1	0		Chile
Air Adelphi	7	6	1		Saint Vincent and the Grenadines
Air Antilles Express	4	4	0		French Antilles
Air Archipels	2	2	0		French Polynesia
Air Borealis	8	8	0		Canada
Air Calédonie	1	1	0		New Caledonia
Aircalin	1	0	0		New Caledonia
Air Inuit	7	7	0		Canada
Air Kiribati	2	2	0		Kiribati
Air Loyauté	3	3	0		New Caledonia
Aircraft Sales and Services for UEP	1	1	0		Pakistan
Air Seychelles	5	5	0		Seychelles
Air Tetiaroa	1	1	0		French Polynesia
Air Tindi	5	5	0		Canada
Air Vanuatu	3	3	0		Vanuatu
Airfast Indonesia	6	6	0		Indonesia
Airkenya Express	3	3	0		Kenya
Aklak Air	1	1	0		Canada
ARM Aviación	2	2	0		Guatemala
Aurora	3	3	0		Russia
Aviakompaniya SKOL	2	0	2		Russia
Aviastar	6	5	1		Indonesia
Ayit Aviation	1	1	0		Israel
Blue Bird Aviation	3	2	1		Sudan
Blue Wing Airlines	2	2	0		Suriname
Cayman Airways Express	2	2	0		Cayman Islands
Chukotavia	4	4	0		Russia
Daily Air	4	3	1		Taiwan
Dimonim Air	1	0	1		Indonesia
Divi Divi Air	3	3	0		Curaçao
Enerjet	1	0	1		Canada
Fiji Link	4	4	0		Fiji
First Flying	2	2	0		Japan
FlyBig	0	0	0	10	India
Grand Canyon Airlines	13	6	7		United States
Gum Air	2	2	0		Suriname
Harbour Air Seaplanes	3	3	0		Canada
InterCaribbean Airways	1	1	0		Turks and Caicos Islands
Isles of Scilly Skybus	4	4	0		England
Jam Air Express	1	1	0		Jamaica
Kenn Borek Air	15	11	4		Canada
LADE	7	5	2		Argentina
Loganair	3	3	0		Scotland
Maldivian	11	10	1		Maldives
Manta Air	6	5	1		Maldives
MASwings	6	2	4		Malaysia
Meiya Air	0	0	0	5	China
Merpati Nusantara Airlines	6	0	6		Indonesia
Nature Air	1	0	1		Costa Rica
Nepal Airlines	3	2	1		Nepal
Nordic Seaplanes	1	1	0		Denmark
Norlandair	3	3	0		Iceland
North-Wright Airways	2	2	0		Canada
Osprey Wings	2	1	1		Canada
PAL Airlines	1	1	0		Canada
PNG Air	1	0	1		Papua New Guinea
Regional Air	1	0	1		Tanzania
Regional Air	1	1	0		Papua New Guinea
SAM Air	2	2	0		Indonesia
Samoa Airways	3	2	1		Samoa
Seaborne Airlines	2	2	0		United States Virgin Islands
Servicios Aéreos de los Andes	1	1	0		Peru
SJL Aeronautica	3	3	0		Angola
SKS Airways	2	0	2		Malaysia
Solomon Airlines	4	4	0		Solomon Islands
SonAir	5	0	5		Angola
Star Aviation	2	2	0		Algeria
Tara Air	4	4	0	3	Nepal
Trans Maldivian Airways	62	62	0		Maldives
Transportes Aereos Petroleros (TAPSA)	1	1	0		Argentina
Transwest Air	9	9	0		Canada
Tsaradia	2	0	2		Madagascar
Winair (Saint Maarten)	5	5	0		Sint Maarten
Zimex Aviation	9	7	2		Switzerland

== Historical civil operators ==
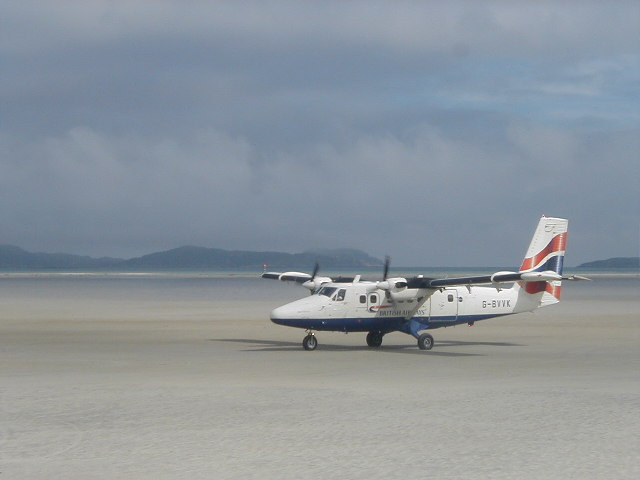
Loganair Twin Otter in British Airways Livery at Barra Airport

♠ original operators

Former operators are listed where possible.

Antigua and Barbuda

- Leeward Islands Air Transport (LIAT) ♠ - former operator

Australia

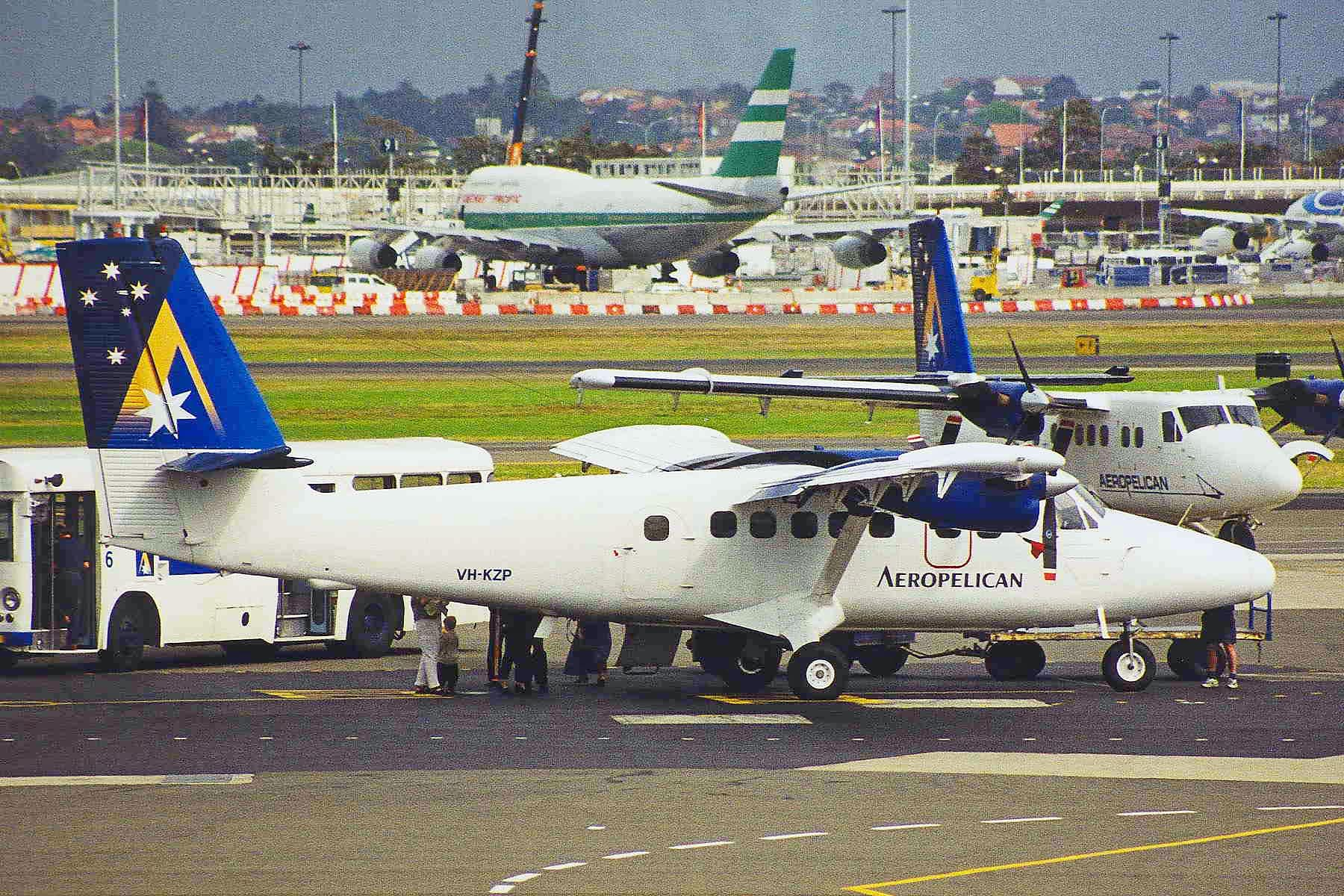
Two DHC-6-300s operated by Aeropelican for Ansett Australia at Sydney Airport in 2012

- Aeropelican
- Air Queensland
- Flight West
- MacRobertson Miller Airlines
- Skywest Airlines
- Sunstate Airlines
- Trans Australia Airlines

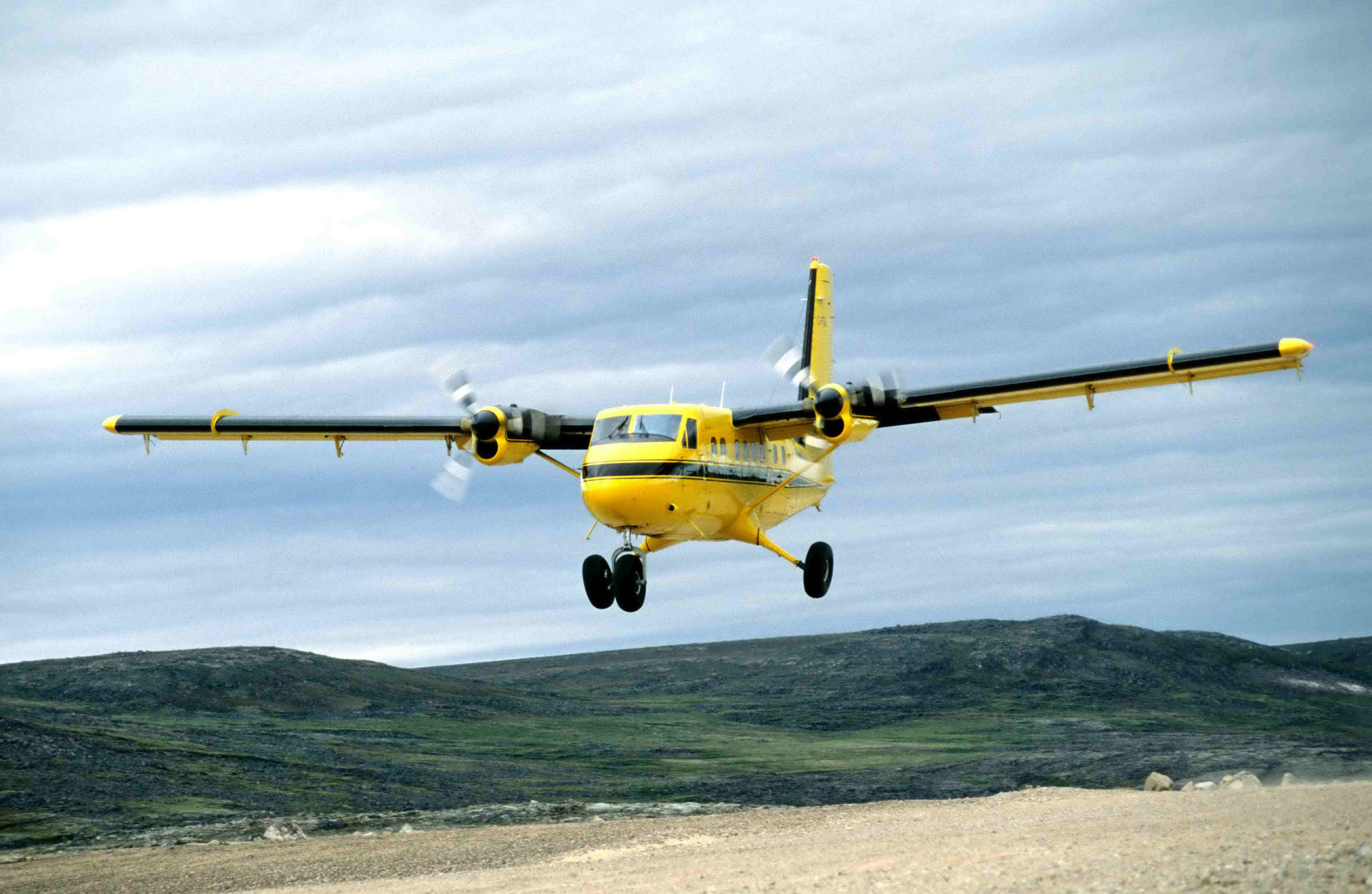
Twin Otter taking off from a gravel airstrip near Sila Lodge at Wager Bay (Ukkusiksalik National Park, Nunavut, Canada)

Canada

- AirWest Airlines (Canada)
- Athabaska Airlines ♠
- Austin Airways
- Bradley Air Services - (now First Air)

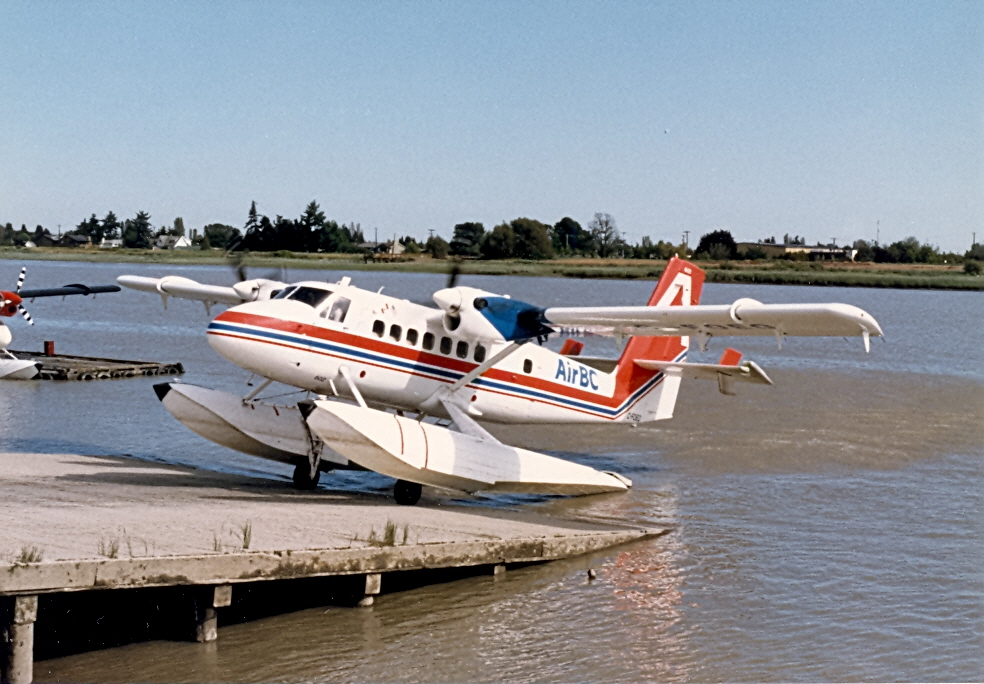
Air BC Twin Otter being beached

- Calm Air International
- Georgian Bay Airlines ♠
- Kenn Borek Air
- Labrador Airways
- Midwest Airlines ♠
- Ministry of Natural Resources (Ontario) ♠ - forest firefighting

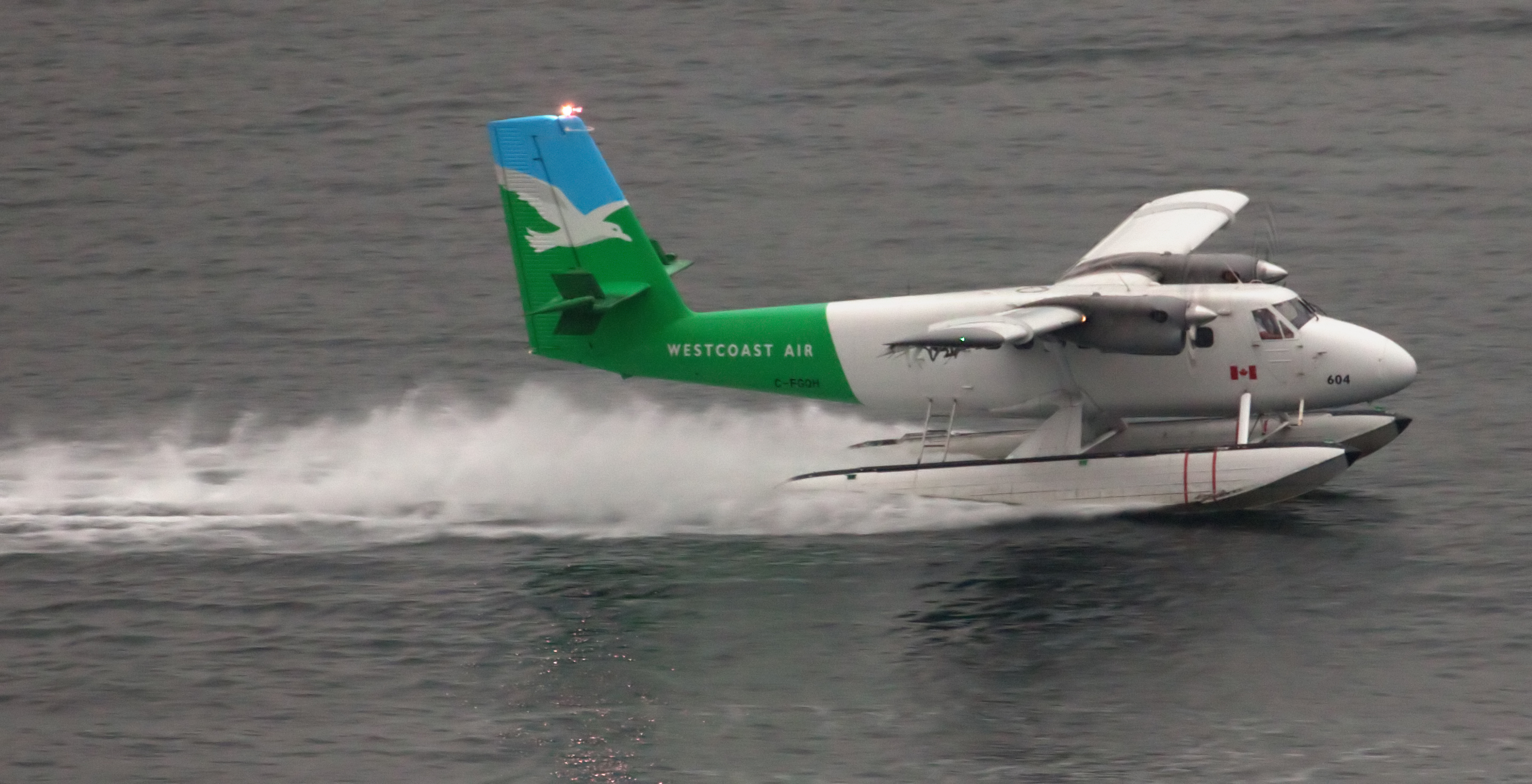
Westcoast Air Twin Otter

- NorOntair
- Northwood Airlines ♠
- Pacific Western Airlines (PWA) - former operator
- Ptarmigan Airways - former operator (merged into First Air)
- Sabourin Lake Airways
- Sander Geophysics
- Transport Canada - former operator, 15 aircraft
- Time Air
- Wardair Canada ♠ - former operator

Cape Verde

- TACV Cabo Verde Airlines

Colombia

- ACES Colombia

Congo

- Lina Congo

Djibouti

- Air Djibouti

France

- Air Alpes ♠
- Air Calédonie
- Air Caraïbes - a DHC-6-300 crashed in March 2001 near Saint Barthélemy airport
- Air Guadeloupe
- Air Polynesie (now Air Tahiti)

Germany

- Delta Air
- DLT
- HADAG Air

Guyana

- Guyana Airways

Indonesia

- Merpati Nusantara Airlines ♠

Israel

- SkyKef
- Ayit Aviation and Tourism

Italy

- Aeralpi

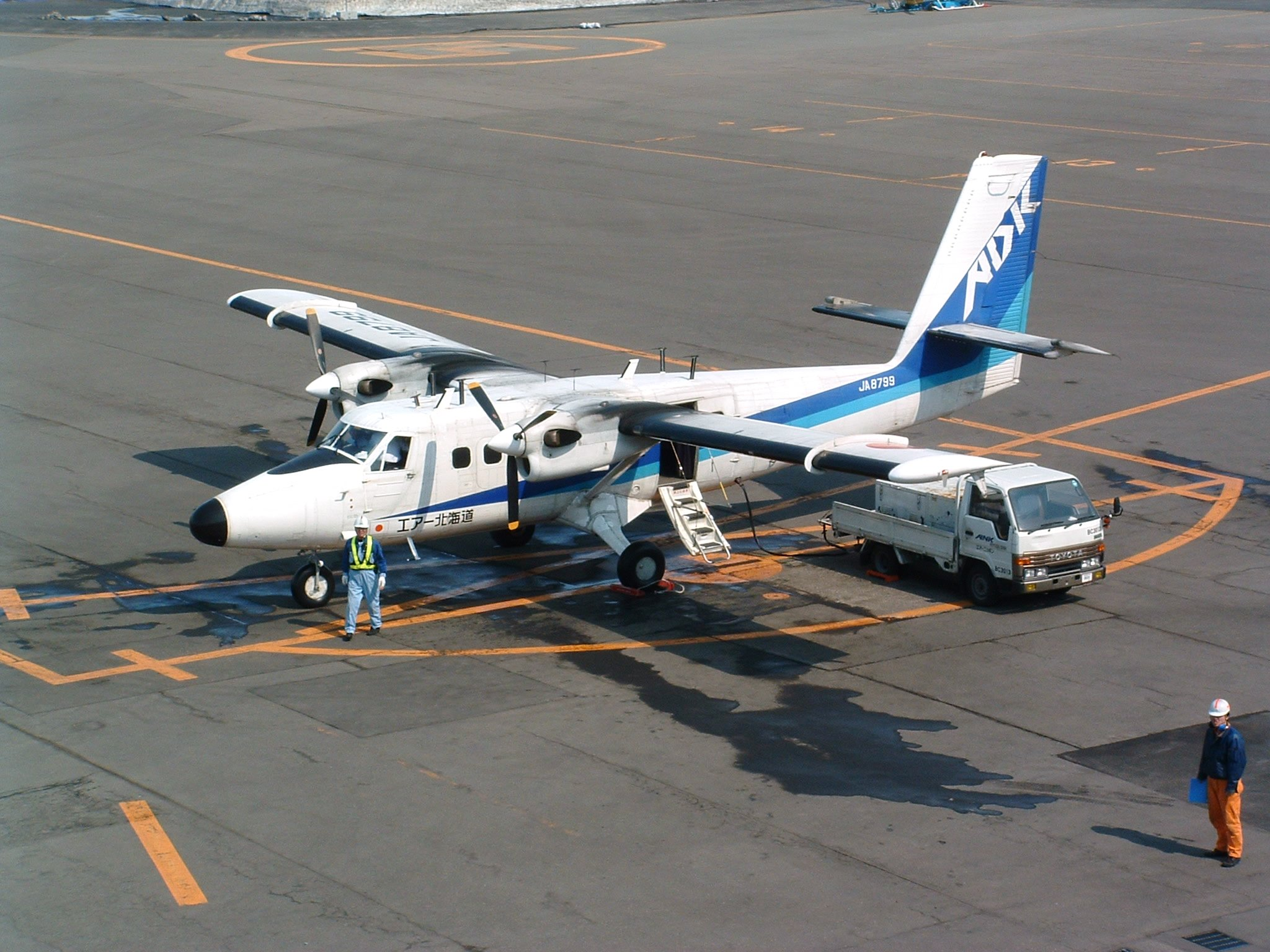
Air Hokkaido Twin Otter

Laos

- Lao Air

Madagascar

- Air Madagascar

Maldives

- Maldivian

Mauritius

- Air Mauritius

Mali

- Air Mali

Oman

- Oman Air
- Oman aviation services

Mexico

- Aeronaves de Mexico♠ and successor Aeromexico
- Transportes Aereos Terrestes♠

Norway

- Widerøe♠ - former operator

Pakistan

- ASSL for UEP - Current operator

Papua New Guinea

- Ansett Airlines of Papua New Guinea - former operator

Spain

- Spantax ♠

United States

- Air Commuter ♠ - former operator
- Air Illinois - former operator
- Air New England
- Air North
- Alaska Aeronautical Industries (AAI)
- Air Wisconsin ♠ - former operator
- Crown Airways
- Frontier Airlines
- Golden West Airlines
- Hawaii Jet-Air ♠ - former operator
- Metroflight Airlines
- Northern Consolidated Airlines (NCA) ♠ - former operator (acquired by Wien Air Alaska which in turn continued to operate these DHC-6 aircraft).
- Pilgrim Airlines ♠ - former operator (acquired by Business Express)
- Rocky Mountain Airways
- Trans East International ♠ - former operator

== Military and government operators ==
Including police users.

Argentina

- Argentine Air Force (Marambio Base) / LADE
- Argentine Army
- Argentine Navy

Australia

- 2 Australian Antarctic Division - leased from Kenn Borek Air
- 3 Australian Army - former operator, leased aircraft with civil registration
- 2 Northern Territory Aerial Medical Service - former operator, leased from Trans Australia Airlines

Benin

- 1 Benin Air Force

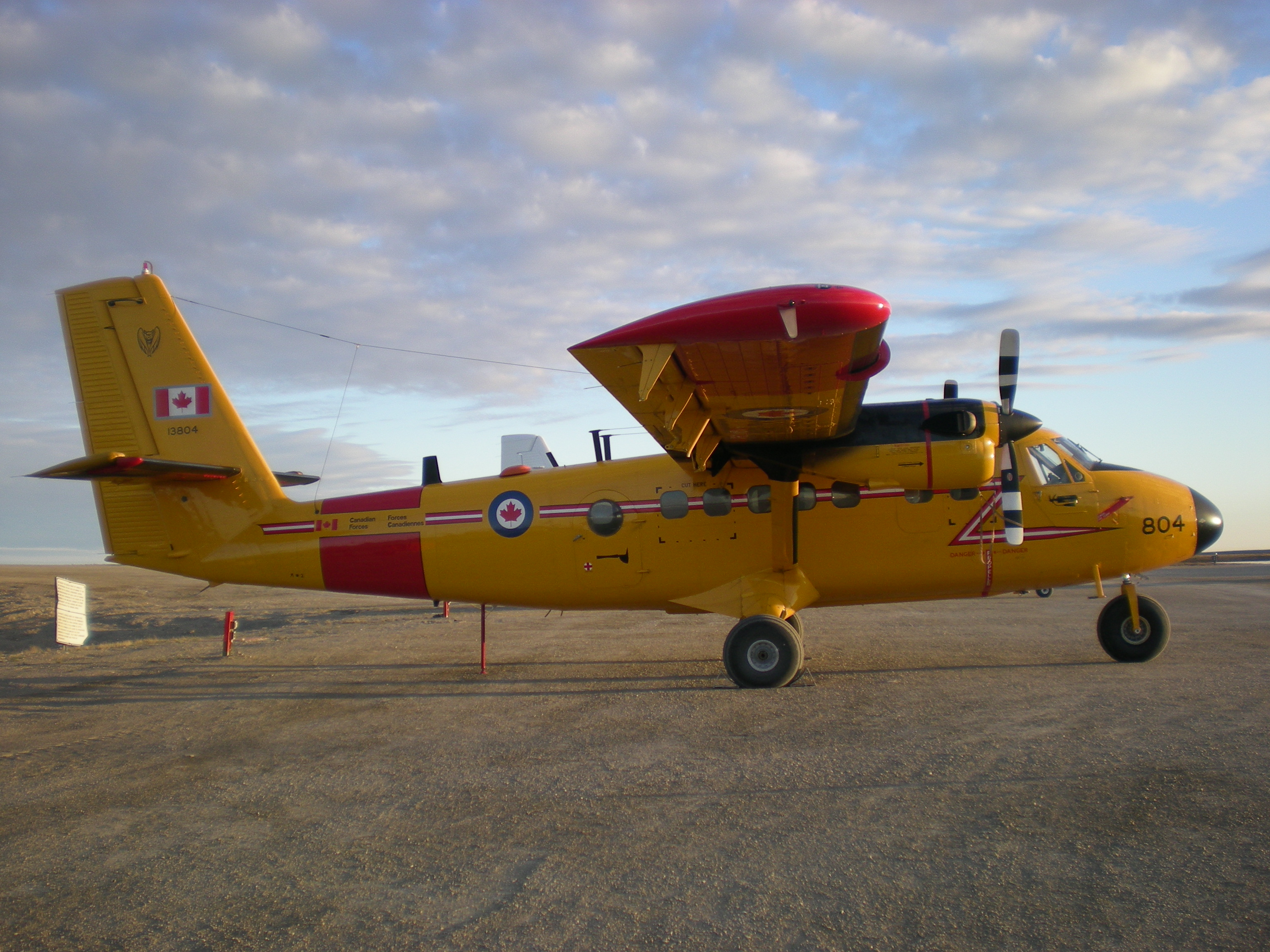
Canadian Armed Forces Twin Otter

Canada

- 4 Royal Canadian Air Force (formerly Canadian Forces) - CC-138s (DHC-6-300s) - Operated by 440 Transport Squadron in Yellowknife, NT
- 1 Ontario Ministry of Natural Resources - former operator
- 1 Ontario Provincial Police - former operator
- 1 Transport Canada - former operator

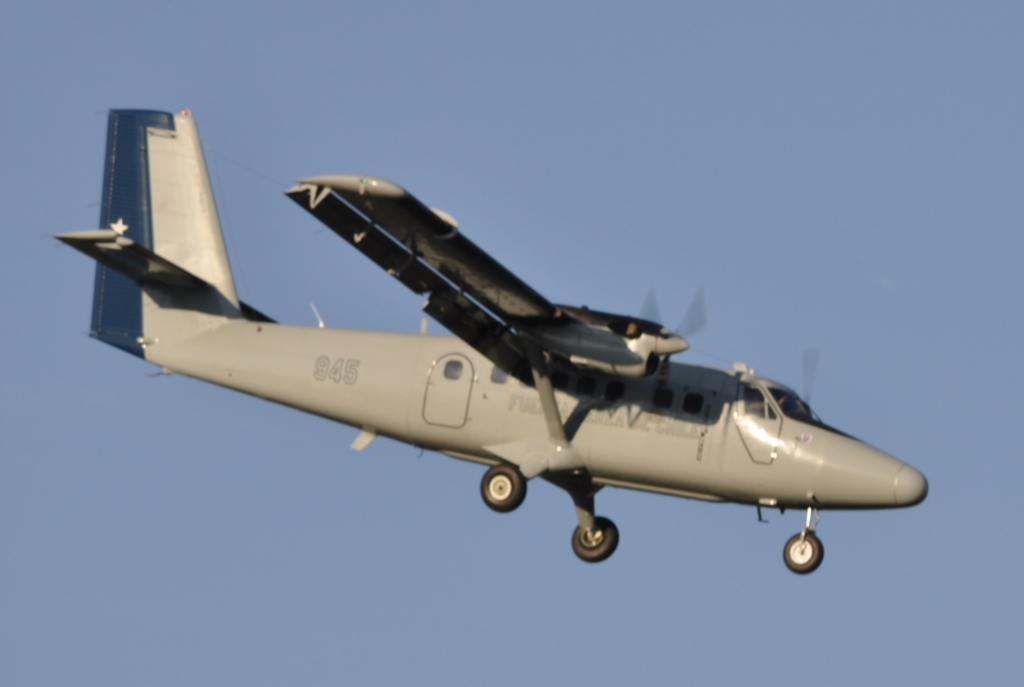
Chilean Air Force Twin Otter

Chile

- 11 Chilean Air Force

Colombia

- Colombian National Police

Denmark

- 2 Home Guard (Denmark) A third aircraft is planned to be delivered by summer 2026.

Ecuador

- 2 Ecuadorian Air Force (TAME)

Ethiopia

- 2 Ethiopian Air Force loaned from Army

France

- 5 French Air and Space Force

Haiti

- 1 Haitian Air Force

Ireland

- 1 Viking Guardian 400 variant operated by Irish Air Corps for the Garda Air Support Unit.

Jamaica

- ? (retired) Jamaica Defence Force

Nepal

- ? (retired) Nepalese Army Air Service
- Nepalese Royal Flight

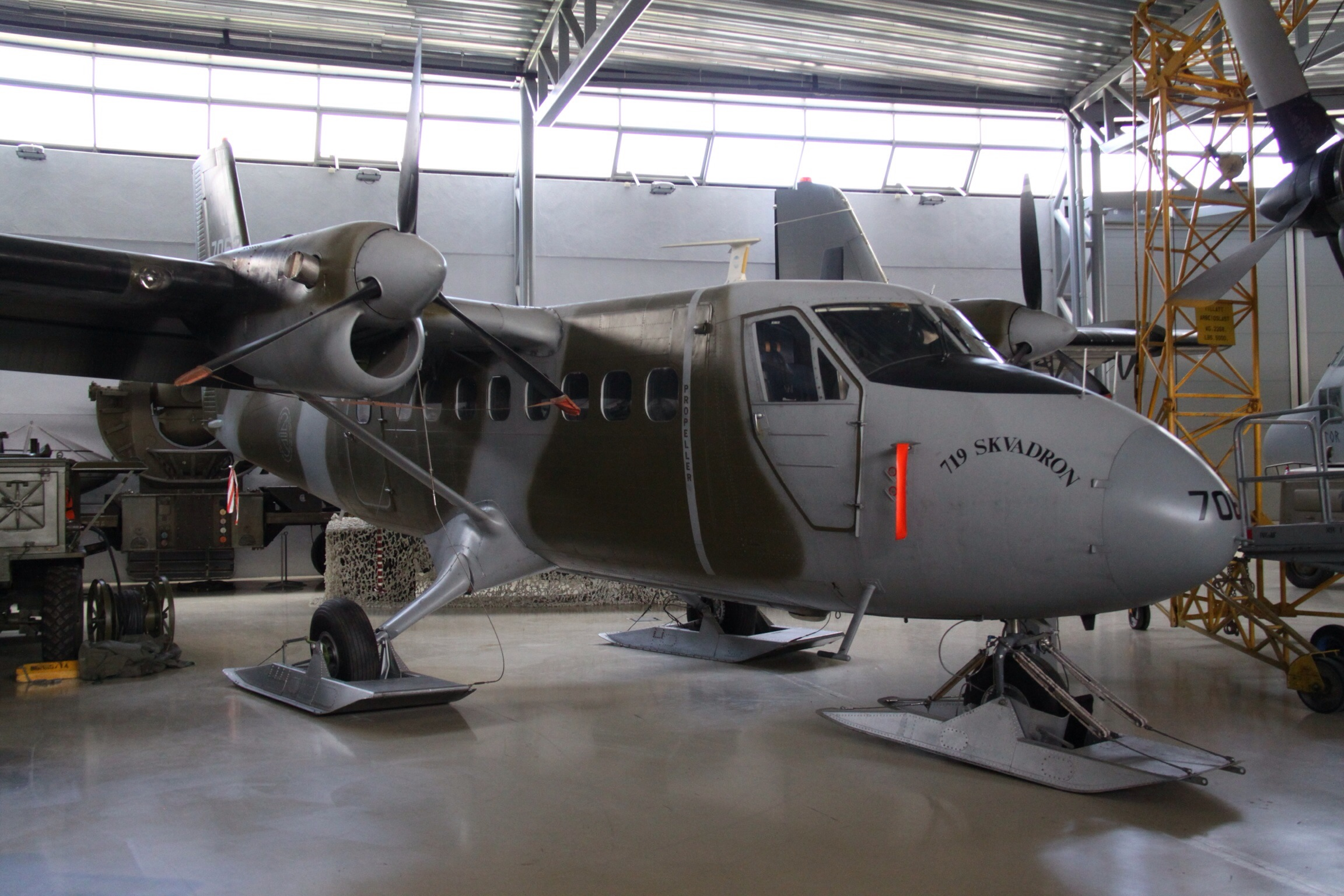
Norwegian Air Force Twin Otter

Norway

- Royal Norwegian Air Force (Retired from active service)

Panama

- Panamanian Public Forces 1 (Army until 1988)
- National Air and Naval Service of Panama

Paraguay

- Paraguayan Air Force (retired)

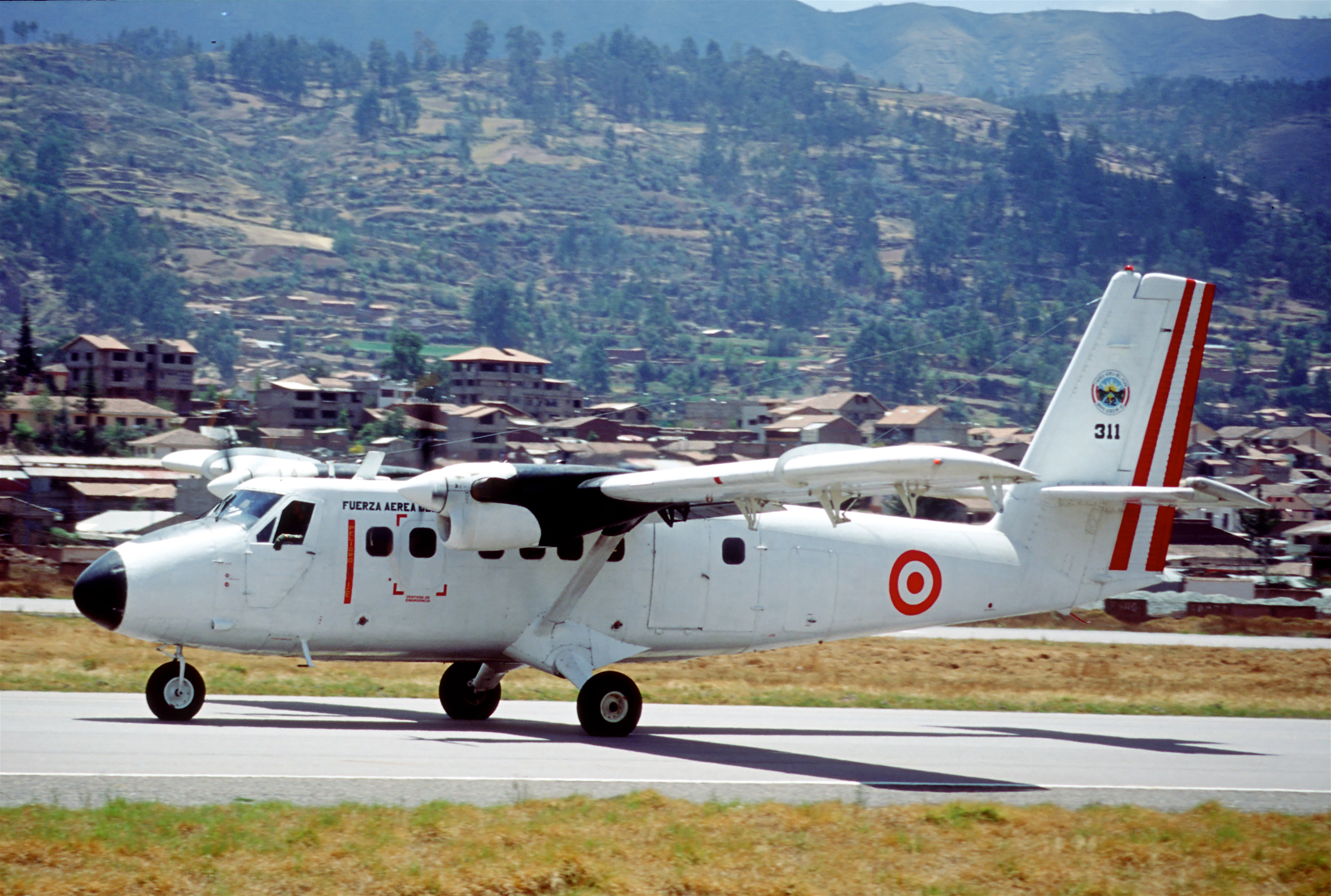
Peruvian Air Force Twin Otter 300

Peru

- Peruvian Air Force (12 series -400 recently purchased)

Sudan

- Sudanese Air Force - one photo survey aircraft operated by Sudan Airways for the air force.

Switzerland

- Swiss Air Force - one operated for the Swiss Office of Topography

Thailand

- Royal Thai Police

Uganda

- Uganda Police Force Air Wing

United Kingdom

- 4 British Antarctic Survey

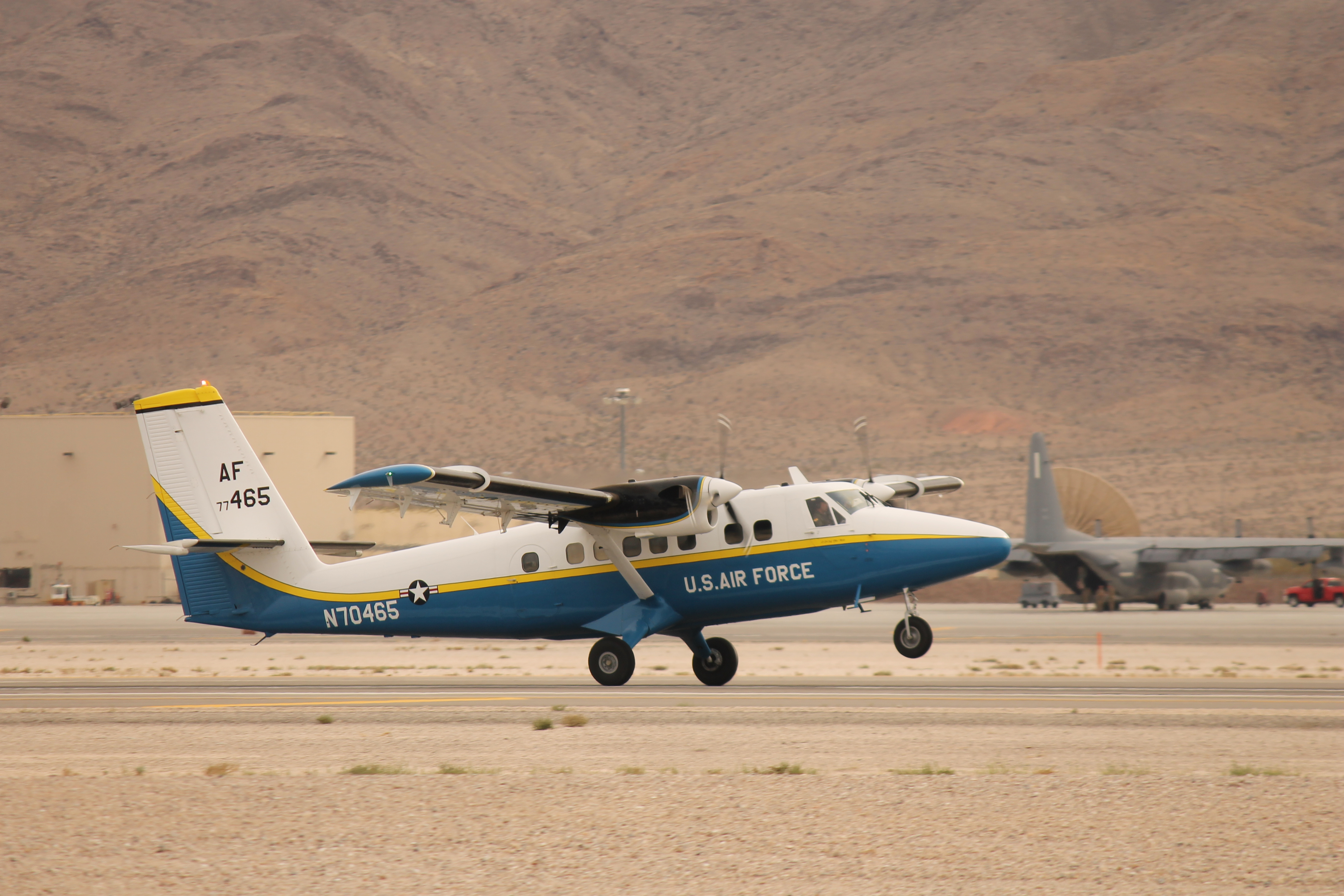
United States Air Force UV-18B

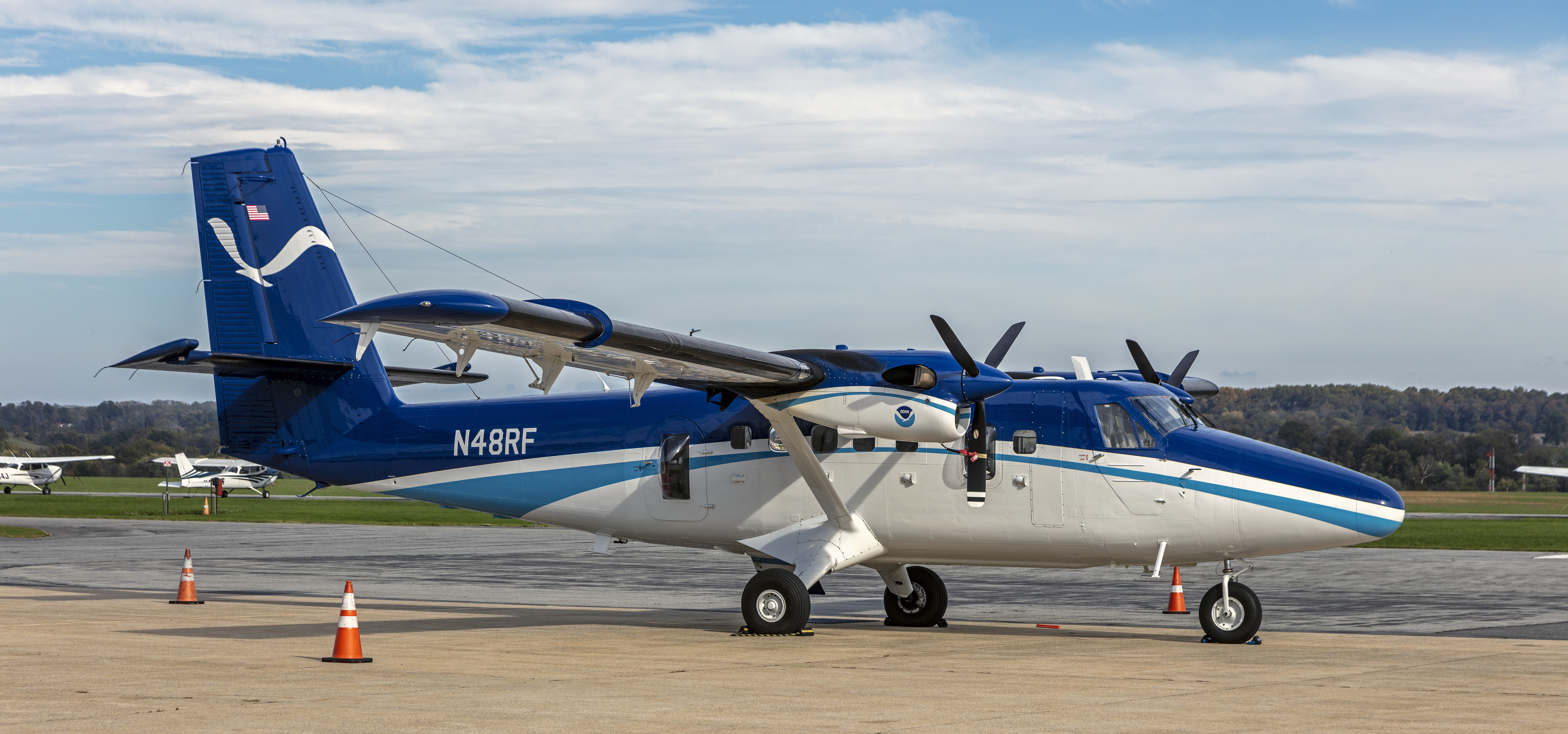
NOAA Twin Otter 300

United States

- 6 Alaska National Guard - UV-18A former operator
- 1 Federal Aviation Administration - former operator, leased from Transport Canada
- 1 NASA
- 4 National Oceanic and Atmospheric Administration
- 3 United States Air Force - UV-18B used by United States Air Force Academy for the Academy Parachute Team
- 3 United States Army - UV-18C
- 1 United States Navy - UV-18A used by the United States Naval Research Laboratory

Vietnam

- 6 Vietnamese People's Navy
