= Kaplan Kirsch LLP =

- Headquarters: Denver, Colorado, United States
- Offices: 4
- Major practice areas: Real Estate, Litigation, Projects, Airports, Rail, Government and Public Policy, Native American Law
- Date founded: 2003
- Website: kaplankirsch.com

Kaplan Kirsch LLP is a national law firm headquartered in Denver, Colorado, with additional offices in Washington, D.C., and New York City. It was established in 2003 by a group of attorneys. The firm focuses on Environmental law, Airport Law, land use, public and private lands, infrastructure, and transportation law.

== History and formation ==
Kaplan Kirsch LLP was founded in 2003 by a group of six attorneys, most of whom had previously practiced at a boutique environmental law firm until its 2000 merger with a large international law firm. All of the founding partners practiced transportation, infrastructure, land use, and environmental law, with a focus on large public development projects and private sector projects with a significant public investment component. The firm later grew to incorporate transit and rail projects in 2006 and public-private partnerships in 2017.

== Projects ==
=== Airports ===
Starting in the late 1990s, members of the firm led negotiations for a 7-year standstill between the Hollywood Burbank Airport and the city of Los Angeles that led to a development agreement that allowed terminal improvements to meet contemporary design and security needs. The principle was that a standstill or détente might reduce tensions and pave the way for a long-term peace between the airport and its neighbors, which proved to be successful. Most recently, Kaplan Kirsch led the City in negotiations for a final resolution of the 45-year dispute. This agreement changes the governance of the Airport Authority to give city appointees greater influence over major airport decisions, provides for a development agreement for the replacement of the airport terminal on a new site, enables the use of adjacent property for airport-oriented commercial development, and approves the replacement terminal. The final set of agreements was approved by the voters in a referendum in November 2016.

In 2013, the firm led a coalition of more than 40 small commercial service airports in litigation and legislative effort to reinstate funding for federal contract air traffic control towers after federal sequestration cuts would have eliminated towers at 250 airports nationwide. The firm filed multiple lawsuits in many federal courts of appeals, assisted in developing a public communications strategy, and helped lead a legislative lobbying and communications strategy in the Congress with active involvement by the American Association of Airport Executives and state aviation groups.

The firm has represented Clark County, Nevada, owner of the Las Vegas McCarran International Airport, in a variety of matters; including a 2011 petition concerning its proposal to discount airline landing fees in the event that the airline increases its landed weight. Additionally, the firm supervised the preparation and approval of environmental assessments associated with airfield and terminal improvements at McCarran, advised on the management, use, and disposition of Bureau of Land Management lands needed for airport development, and provided continuing counsel on matters relating to noise, air quality compliance, coordination of development and potential height and obstruction impacts on airport operations, as well as general federal regulatory compliance issues.

=== Rail, transit, highways, and infrastructure ===
Beginning in 2006, the firm became involved in the Denver Union Station Site Redevelopment, representing the master developer and developing plans for the light rail, commuter rail, Amtrak, and bus operations. In 2011, the firm served as part of the legal team that represented the Regional Transportation District (RTD) on the EAGLE P3 Project, a $2 billion commuter rail project, with the main line running from Denver Union Station to Denver International Airport.

The firm provided counsel to the Maryland Transit Administration (MTA) in the acquisition of rights-of-way from two Class 1 freight railroads for the state's use in developing the Red Line light rail corridor in Baltimore and the Purple Line light rail inter-county connector in Montgomery and Prince George's Counties. MTA was represented by the firm in extensive proceedings before the Surface Transportation Board and federal circuit courts in connection with MTA's acquisition and development of its commuter and light rail systems and its efforts to railbank unused corridors, and also assisted MTA in compliance matters before the Federal Railroad Administration.

The firm represented King County, Washington, in contested proceedings before the Surface Transportation Board to secure approval as the trail sponsor under the National Trails Act. King County had to defend the trail from attacks by neighboring landowners asserting reversionary property interests in the railbanked right-of-way and two attempts by start-up railroads to obtain rights to use the right-of-way based on speculative plans to provide freight rail service in suburban Seattle.

In 2016, the DC Department of Transportation (DDOT) announced the return of DC Streetcars to Washington, D.C., after a hiatus of over 50 years, and the firm assisted DDOT in negotiations with the Federal Transit Administration and the local safety oversight agency to establish safety management systems for the new service.

In early 2018, the firm helped the Colorado Department of Transportation (CDOT) with a proposed reconstruction a 10-mile stretch of I-70 east of downtown Denver. Opponents of the re-design filed two lawsuits, stating that CDOT had failed to properly analyze the environmental impacts of the project under the National Environmental Policy Act and the Clean Air Act. After reviewing briefings from firm attorneys, the court denied both preliminary injunction motions. In its orders, the court held that the plaintiffs are unlikely to succeed on the merits of any of their legal claims, including claims that the Federal Highway Administration and CDOT had insufficiently considered the Project's impacts on air quality and public health.

=== Environment, public lands, and conservation ===
Beginning in 2008, the firm represented a local government in western Colorado in litigation over the validity of water rights speculatively held by other entities in the watershed and were able to achieve a strong settlement that eliminated two major dam sites on this free-flowing river–one that is eligible for designation as a National Wild and Scenic River.

In 2014 it was announced that the city of Denver would begin redevelopment of the Former Gates Rubber Company Site, and the firm was brought on to assist in the negotiation of the purchase and sale agreement, project due diligence, negotiation of the environmental insurance policy, environmental cleanup and risk management, entitlements, use of special district and tax increment financing, railroad right-of-way issues, transit-oriented development, and private project financing.

The firm represented the local redevelopment authority known as PuebloPlex in negotiating with the U.S. Army and the Colorado Department of Public Health and Environment regarding cleanup requirements and other environmental terms and conditions associated with the transfer to PuebloPlex of approximately 16,000 acres of property within the former U.S. Army Pueblo Chemical Depot in Pueblo, Colorado.

In 2017, the City and County of Denver announced it would begin a 100-year contract with the National Western Center, and the firm was involved as council in developing and negotiating the governance structure and framework agreement for expanding and redeveloping the site.

==== Conservation easements ====
The firm represented Walking Mountains Science Center in its conveyance of a conservation easement to the Eagle Valley Land Trust in Edwards, Colorado, funded in part by Eagle County's Open Space Program.

Last Dollar Ranch, located on the Dallas Divide near Telluride, Colorado, retained Kaplan Kirsch in the conveyance of a conservation easement to the American Farmland Trust. The firm worked with various experts, including the appraiser, biologist, surveyor, and title insurance company and eventually the easement doubled the amount of protected land.

In 2016, the firm represented the owners of the Navajo Headwaters Ranch in the conveyance of several conservation easements to Colorado Open Lands, facilitated by The Conservation Fund. The land is located in the southern San Juan Mountains of southern Colorado, and the team worked on several corporate and debt related issues while taking advantage of the Colorado Conservation Easement Tax Credit.

=== Energy ===
In August 2015, Xcel Energy filed a settlement agreement with the Colorado Public Utilities Commission that would impact how electricity is produced and paid for in Colorado. The firm represented the Solar Energy Industries Association in the months of negotiations that led to this agreement. The settlement expands solar access to low-income customers and significantly increases Colorado's capacity for solar energy by facilitating the development of a new 50-megawatt solar facility, providing for the acquisition of more than 300 megawatts of community solar gardens and distributed solar in a move that was deemed beneficial for the solar industry.

=== National and international organizations ===
- Aircraft Owners and Pilots Association
- Airports Council International – North America
- American Association of Airport Executives
- American Bar Association (and sections)
- American Planning Association
- American Public Transportation Association
- Land Trust Alliance
- Transportation Research Board
- Urban Land Institute

=== Regional and local organizations ===
- Colorado Bar Association
- Denver Metro Chamber of Commerce
- District of Columbia Bar association
- Downtown Denver Partnership
- Florida Airports Council
- Rocky Mountain Land Use Institute
