= Southwest Air Lines Flight 611 =

1982 aviation accident in Japan

Coordinates: 24.344722°N 124.186944°E

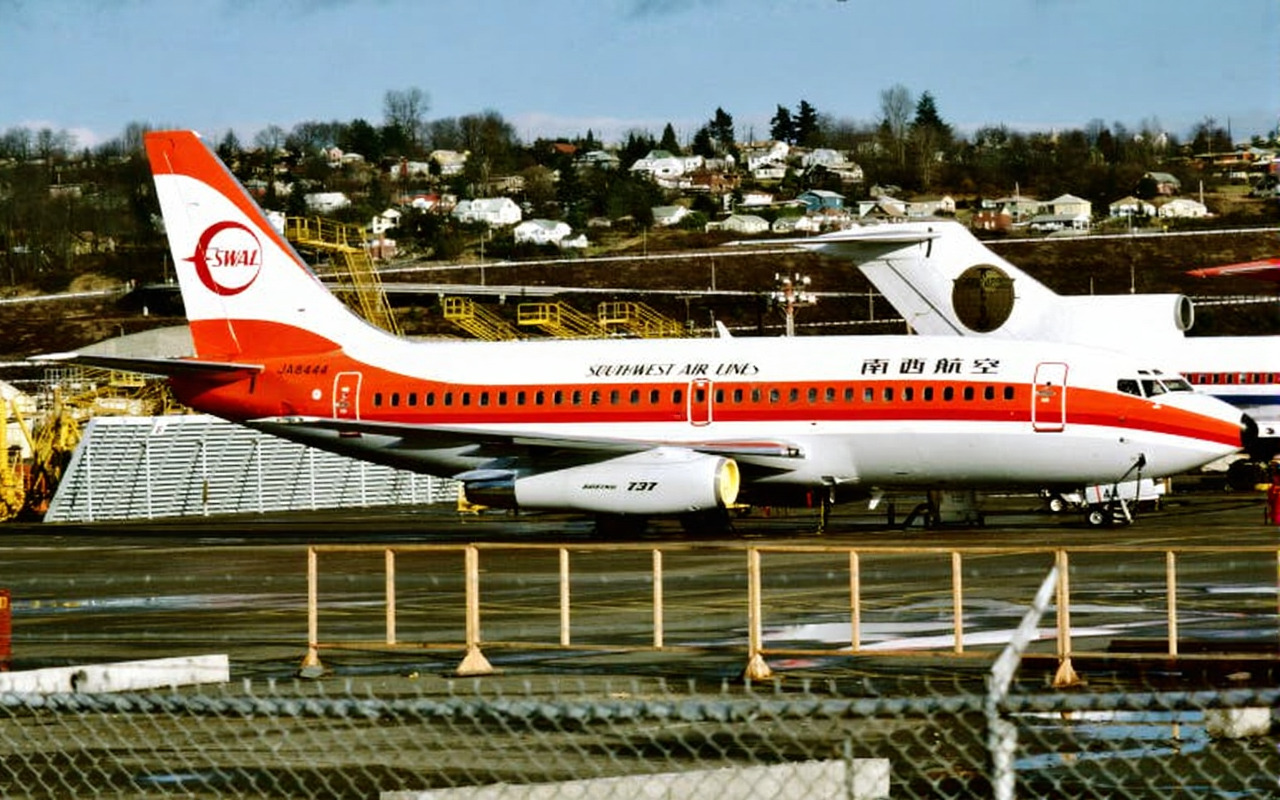
- JA8444, the aircraft involved in the accident, seen in 1979

Accident
- Date: 26 August 1982
- Summary: Runway overrun caused by pilot error compounded by hydroplaning
- Site: Ishigaki Airport

Aircraft
- Aircraft type: Boeing 737-2Q3
- Operator: Southwest Air Lines (now Japan Transocean Air)
- Registration: JA8444
- Flight origin: Naha Airport, Okinawa, Japan
- Destination: Ishigaki Airport
- Occupants: 138
- Passengers: 133
- Crew: 5
- Fatalities: 0
- Injuries: 67 (2 crew 1 Passenger Severely)
- Survivors: 138

Southwest Air Lines Flight 611 was a scheduled flight from Naha to Ishigaki. On 26 August 1982, the Boeing 737-200 overran the runway while attempting to land. The aircraft caught fire and was destroyed, but none of the 133 passengers and 5 crew died in the accident although two crew and one passenger were seriously injured.

== Aircraft and crew ==
The aircraft was a Boeing 737-2Q3 (JA8444) that had its maiden flight in December 1978 and was powered by two Pratt & Whitney JT8D-17 turbofan engines. It had logged 5,056 flight hours at the time of the accident. On the day of the accident, the aircraft had flown from Naha to Miyako and then back, without any problems.

The captain, aged 40, had been with the airline since 1973 and became a Boeing 737 captain in 1980. He had 1,666 flight hours, all of which were on the Boeing 737. The first officer, aged 29, had been with the airline since 1974 and became a 737 first officer in 1981. The first officer had 878 flight hours, all on the Boeing 737.

== Flight ==
Southwest Air Lines Flight 611 took off on runway 36 from Naha Airport on the island of Okinawa (Note: The ASN accident synopsis states that the departure point was Naha Airport in Indonesia; however, the runway at Naha, Indonesia, is oriented in a different direction and is too short for Boeing 737 operations. The airline was based at Naha, Okinawa, and had never operated to Indonesia. The flight from Indonesia to the accident airport took more than three hours) at 13:09 for a regular flight to Ishigaki Airport, Japan. The aircraft climbed to the cruising altitude of Flight level 240 (approximately 24,000 feet [7,315 m]). On approach to Ishigaki, the crew was given weather information for Ishigaki — wind 300 degrees at 12 knots (22 km/h; 14 mph; 6 m/s); temperature 32 °C (90 °F); active runway: Runway 22. At 13:33 Flight 611 descended to 8,000 feet (2,400 m). The crew of Flight 611 made a crosswind landing at a speed of 131 knots (243 km/h; 151 mph), slightly higher than the reference airspeed. The aircraft bounced and on touching down again the spoilers and thrust reversers did not seem to operate.The flight crew shut down both engines but this action disabled the anti-skid braking system, and during the landing rolls the inner tires on both main gear legs burst almost simultaneously. Flight 611 overran the runway and came to rest 145 metres (476 ft; 159 yd) beyond the threshold at 13:49. Everyone on board was evacuated. At 14:01 the Boeing 737 caught fire and was destroyed.

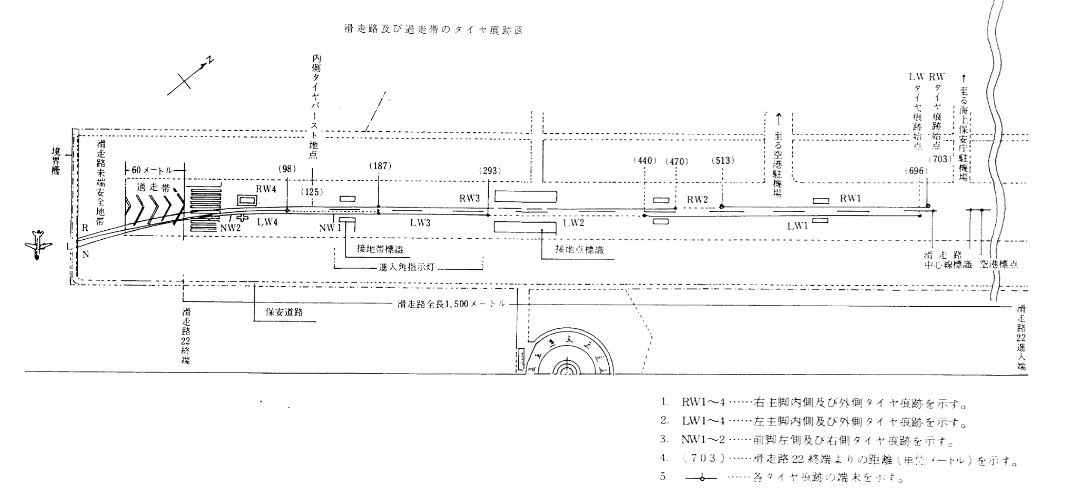
Diagram of flight 611's landing (in Japanese)

None of the 138 passengers and crew were killed in the accident, but 67 were injured. Serious injuries were prevented by a quick evacuation although a stewardess and an elderly woman passenger were detained in hospital.

== Investigation ==
The Aircraft Accident Investigation Commission (AAIC) investigated the accident. The investigators initially suspected that a mechanical failure had caused the accident, but five days later, the AAIC stated that the flight crew's actions was more likely because of the high-speed landing.

The AAIC determined that the cause of the accident was the flight crew's inappropriate decision to shut down the engines and the captain's delay in applying the brakes. The lack of anti-skid reduced braking action to half of what it would have been if the anti-skid was on. Even with the high-speed landing, the accident could have been prevented by applying maximum braking and not shutting down the engines, which would have resulted in the aircraft stopping in the runway safety area instead of overshooting the runway altogether.

== Aftermath ==
The Japanese branch of the Air Line Pilots Association (ALPA) questioned the AAIC's findings on the accident. A criminal prosecution of the captain, citing negligence, was opened by the Naha District Prosecutor's Office, but the case was later dismissed due to lack of evidence.

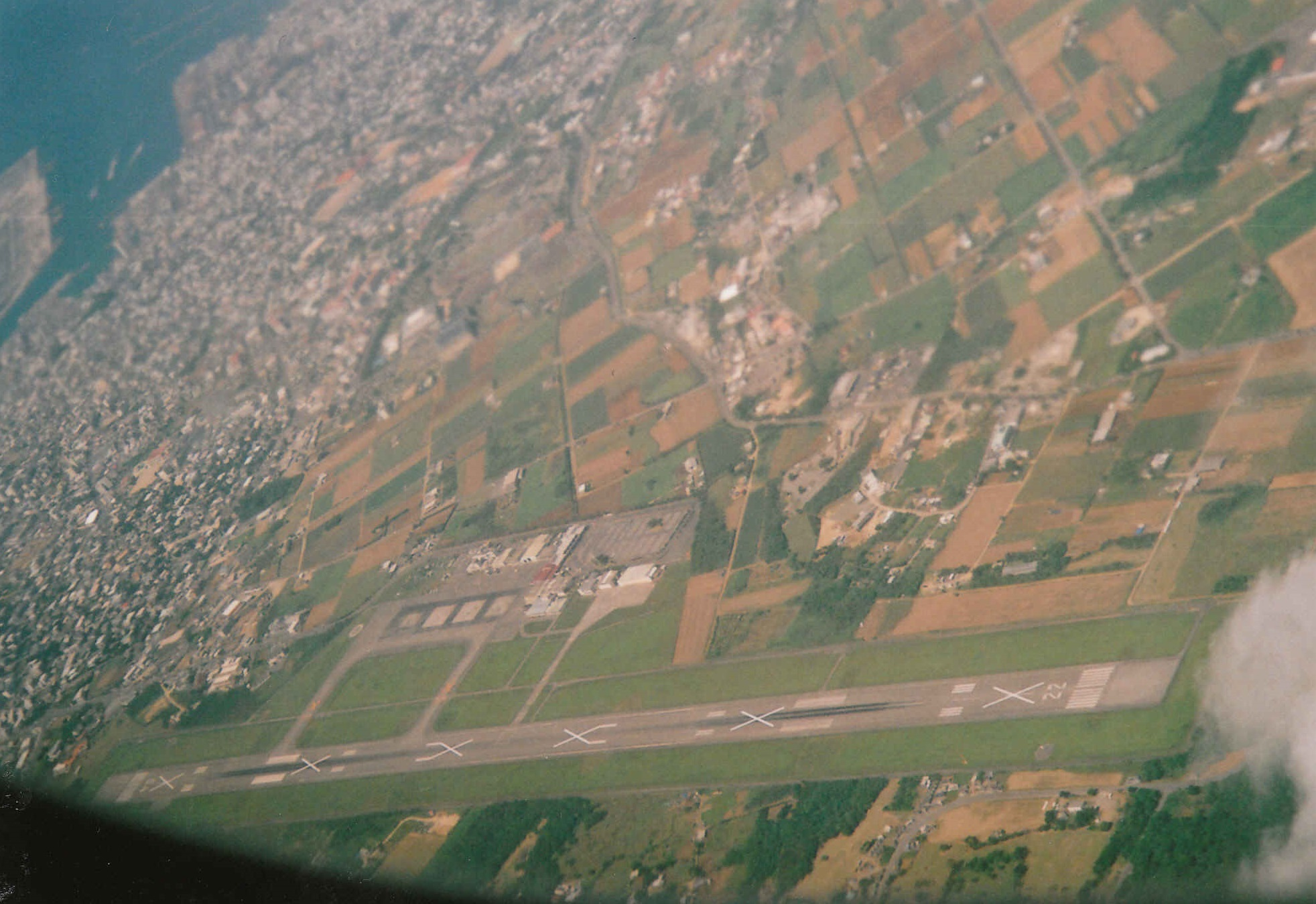
Overview of Ishigaki Airport

Aviation official determined that Ishigaki Airport's runway length of 4,900 feet (1,494 m), was insufficient for the Boeing 737 to land on safely. This led to Ishigaki Airport being closed in 2013 and it was replaced by the New Ishigaki Airport.

In 2008, before Ishigaki Airport was closed, a training for a runway overrun was held at the airport, with 250 people participating.

== See also ==
- Atlantic Airways Flight 670
