= Hateruma Airport =

Hateruma Airport 波照間空港
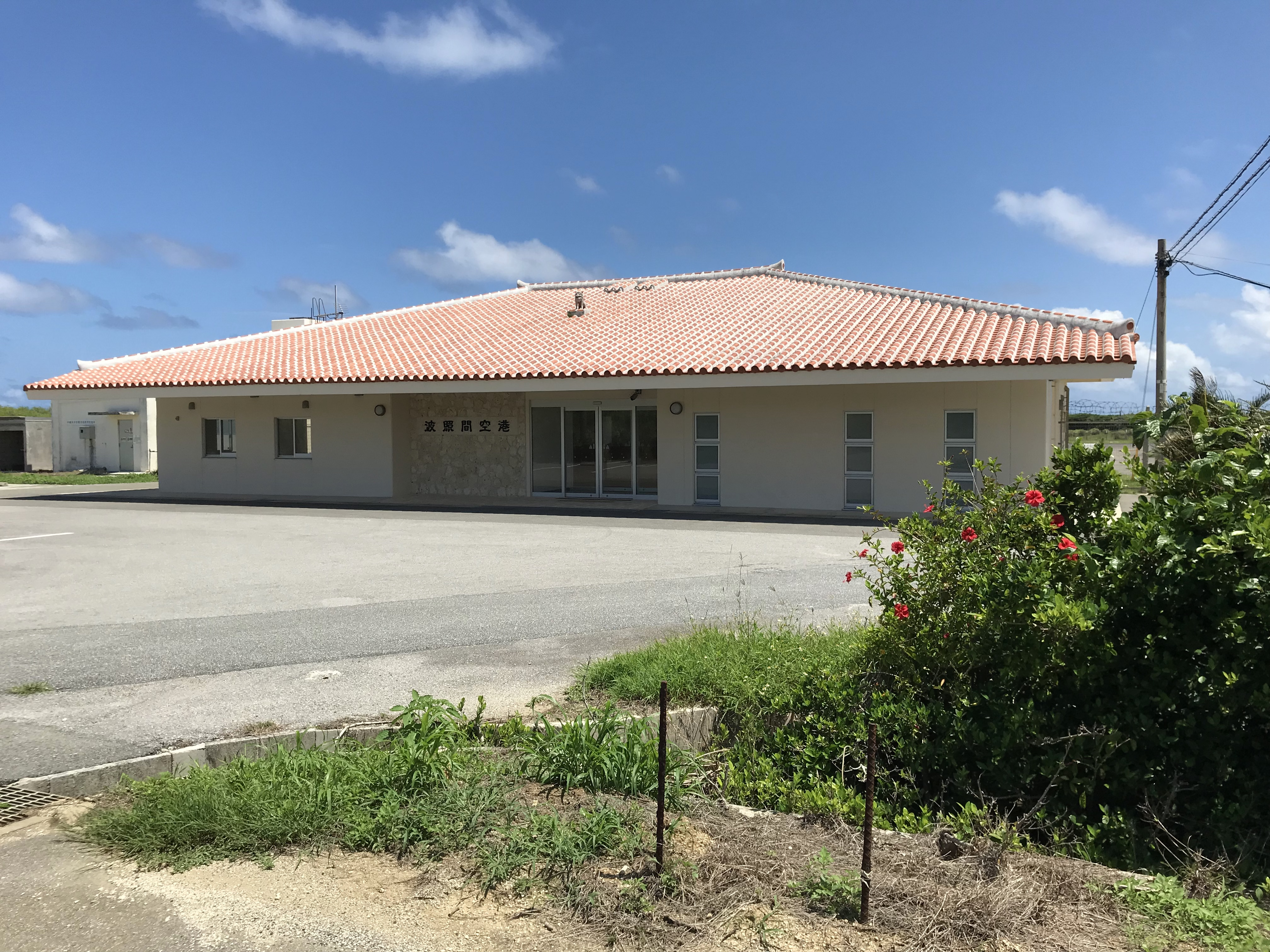
- IATA: HTR; ICAO: RORH

Summary
- Airport type: Public
- Operator: Okinawa Prefecture
- Serves: Taketomi, Okinawa, Japan
- Location: Hateruma
- Elevation AMSL: 43 ft (13 m)
- Coordinates: 24°03′30″N 123°48′14″E

Map
- Location in Japan RORH (Japan)

Runways
Direction	Length		Surface
Direction	m	ft	Surface
02/20	800	2,625	Asphalt concrete
- Source: Japanese AIP at AIS Japan

Hateruma Airport (波照間空港, Hateruma Kūkō) (IATA: HTR, ICAO: RORH) is located on Hateruma island in Taketomi, Yaeyama District, Okinawa Prefecture, Japan. The prefecture operates the airport, which is classified as a third class airport.

== History ==
Established as an emergency landing field in 1972 with runway of 850m.

== Airlines and Destinations ==
In Hateruma Airport, there is currently no scheduled flight. However, a charter flight operated by First Flying is available on Monday, Wednesday and Saturday to Ishigaki Airport.

== Gallery ==
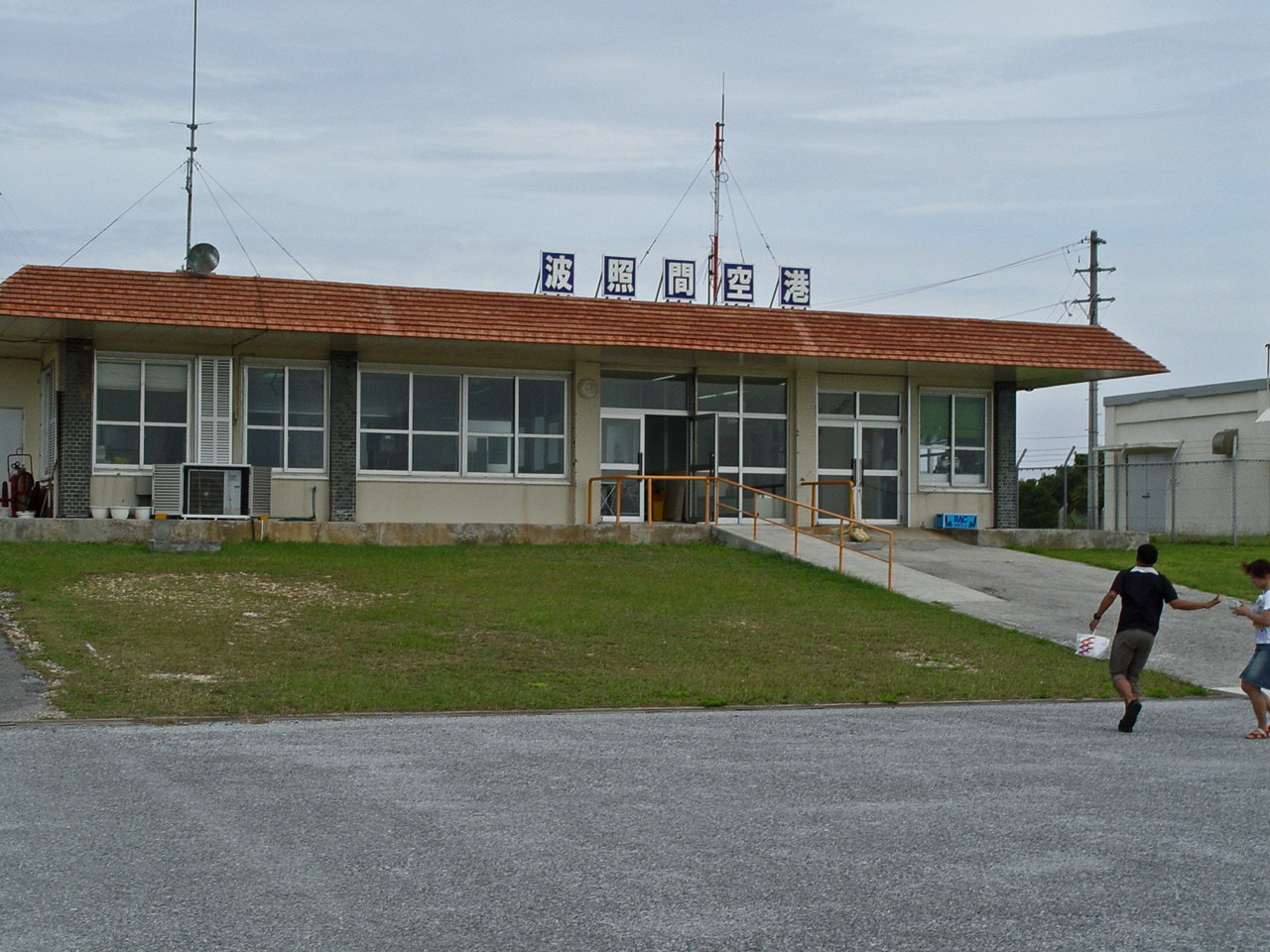
Hateruma Airport before rebuilding

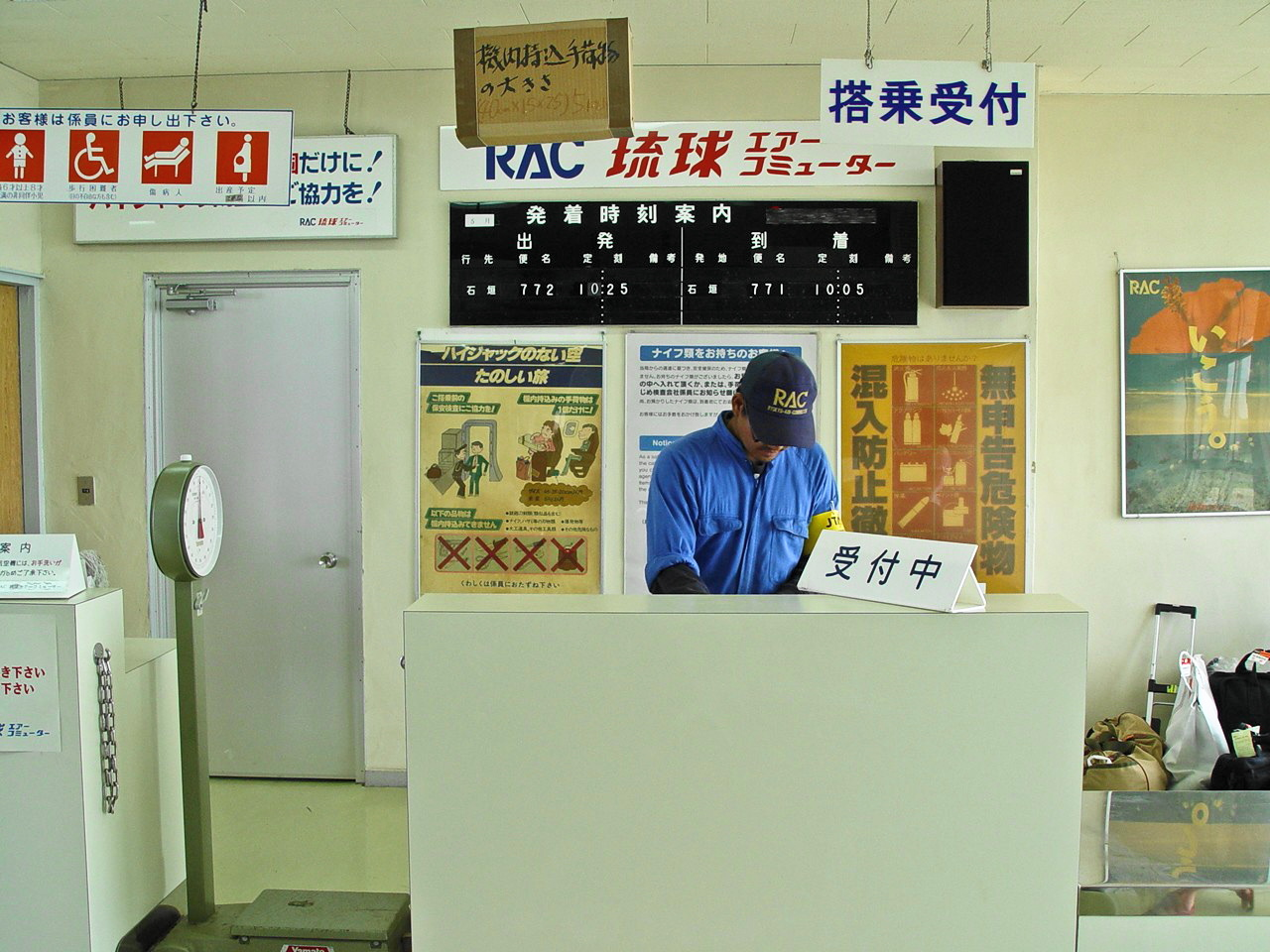
A Ryukyu Air Commuter counter at Hateruma; as of 2008 Ryukyu Air Commuter no longer serves Hateruma
