= First Flying =

Japanese airline

IATA	ICAO	Call sign
—	DAK	None
- Founded: June 14, 1966
- Hubs: Yao Airport; Hiroshima-Nishi Airport; Naha Airport; New Ishigaki Airport
- Fleet size: 18
- Destinations: 4
- Headquarters: Yao Airport
- Website: dai1air.com

First Flying Co., Ltd. (第一航空株式会社, Dai-Ichi Kōkū Kabushiki-Gaisha) is an air carrier based at Yao Airport in Yao, Osaka Prefecture, Japan. It operates interisland passenger service in Okinawa Prefecture and provides sightseeing flights, flight training, a flying club and other irregular services at Yao Airport and Hiroshima-Nishi Airport.

== Destinations ==
First Flying's service in Okinawa and New Ishigaki follows a timetable, therefore flights may be cancelled if there are no passengers.

- Aguni Airport
- Naha Airport
- New Ishigaki Airport
- Hateruma Airport

First Flying resumed service between New Ishigaki Airport, Hateruma Airport and Tarama Airport in January 2024 using Twin Otter aircraft.

== Fleet ==
First Flying operates the following fleet:

Aircraft	Total
Britten-Norman BN-2 Islander	3
Cessna 208	3
Cessna 206	3
Cessna 172	5
Robinson R44	2
Robinson R22	2
De Havilland Canada DHC-6-400 Twin Otter	2 (as of July 2026)
