= 1970 Tenroku gas explosion =

1970 accidental gas explosion in Osaka, Japan

Ten-roku gas explosion accident
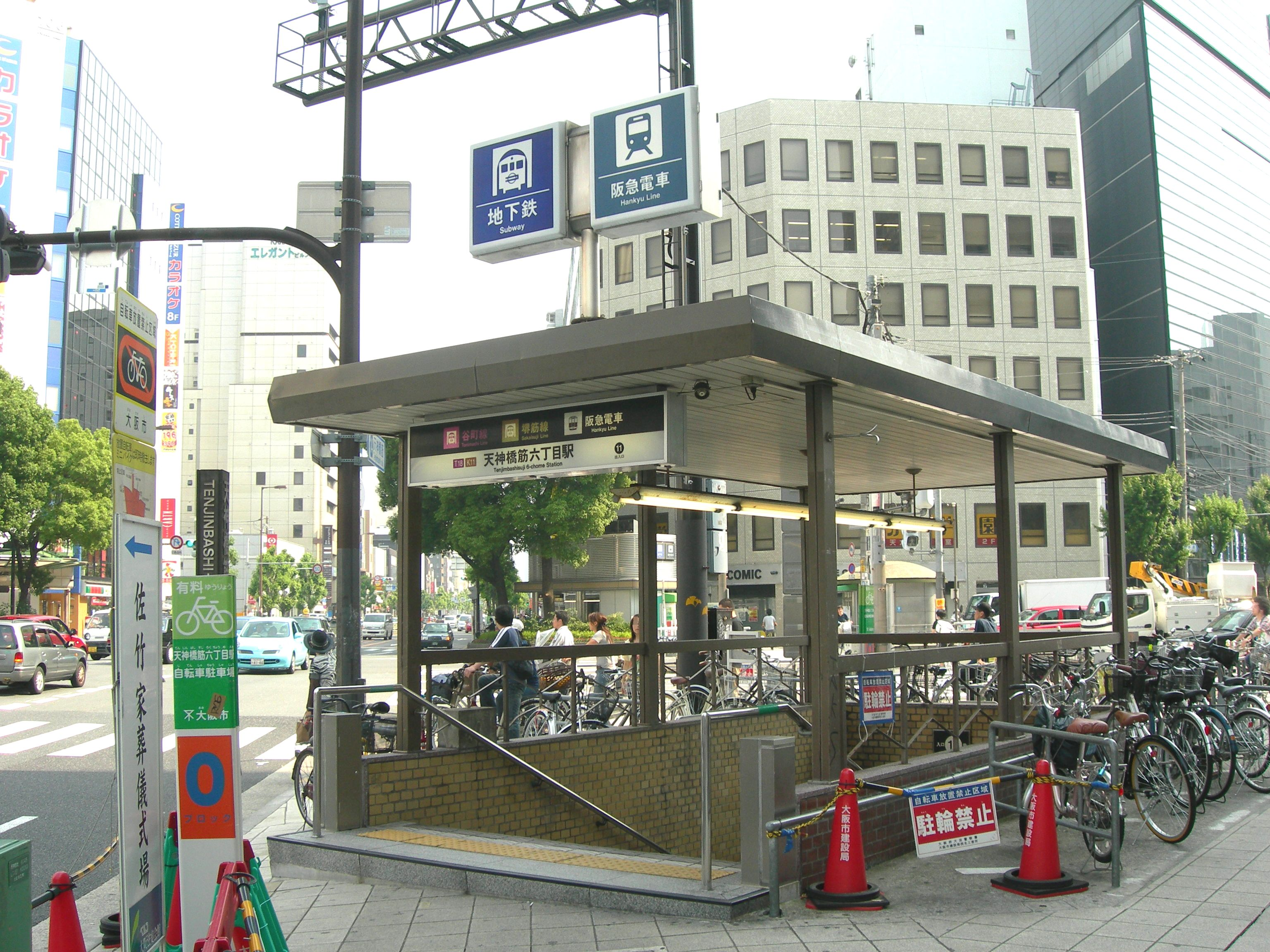
- The entrance to Tenjimbashisuji Rokuchōme Station in 2011
- Date: 8 April 1970
- Time: 5:47 pm (JST)
- Location: Tenjimbashisuji Rokuchōme Station, Kita-ku, Osaka, Japan
- Cause: Gas leak
- Deaths: 79
- Injuries: 420
- Property damage: 495 buildings damaged or destroyed

The Tenroku gas explosion (天六ガス爆発事故, Tenroku gasu bakuhatsu jiko) occurred at approximately 5:47 pm on 8 April 1970 in Osaka, Japan, when a gas leak during construction at Tenjimbashisuji Rokuchōme Station in downtown Osaka resulted in a massive explosion and fire that killed 79 people, injured 420 others, and damaged 495 buildings. It is one of the worst gas explosions in Japanese history.

== Background ==
Tenjimbashisuji Rokuchōme Station is an Osaka Metro subway station in the Kita-ku ward. The station and the surrounding area are often given the shortened nickname "Tenroku". It originally opened in 1925 as Tejinbashi Station, an above-ground station for the Hankyu Senri Line, before being replaced by the underground station in 1969 to serve the Sakaisuji Line. By early 1970, Tenjimbashisuji Rokuchōme Station had been completed, but construction continued so the Tanimachi Line could be expanded between Higashi-Umeda Station and Miyakojima Station.

At the time, Japan had been experiencing widespread modernization, and large-scale developments of cities like Tokyo, Osaka, and Sapporo were not uncommon. This included the expansion of underground subways like the Tanimachi Line. To construct the subway tunnels, workers used an open-cut method and excavated along street routes, covering the tunnels with concrete slabs and steel plates so traffic could continue to flow with minimal disruption. However, the construction of these tunnels, conducted alongside other modernization projects of sewers and buildings, threatened the preexisting gas, water, and electrical lines beneath Japanese cities, which were laid haphazardly long before the modernization projects and could potentially get in the way of subterranean excavations. The constant construction work and vibrations from surface traffic also affected the buried utility lines, to the point of damaging them. Indeed, the gas pipe involved in the leak was installed in May 1957 and was believed to have been dislodged and exposed from the digging, with the leak starting after the pipe began to crack.

In 1970, Osaka Prefecture was hosting Expo '70, which had started on 15 March. The fairground itself was in Suita, roughly 10 to 12 miles from Tenjimbashisuji Rokuchōme Station.

== Explosion ==
At around 5:15 pm on 8 April 1970, a group of construction workers at Tenjimbashisuji Rokuchōme Station noticed gas had begun blowing out of a gas pipe in the subway tunnel that had been exposed and shifted during excavation. The workers evacuated the tunnel and, alongside a passing Osaka Gas vehicle that also detected the gas leak, called for an emergency maintenance team from Osaka Gas to respond to the incident. The Osaka Municipal Fire Department and Osaka Prefectural Police responded to the gas leak ahead of the repair team and began cordoning the scene and evacuating the area.

Some time later, the maintenance team arrived in two service vehicles, one of which parked on top of a cover plate and turned off its engine, possibly because of the engine stalling. At 5:39 pm, while the maintenance team was assessing the leak, the driver of the vehicle turned the engine back on. Unbeknownst to the driver, this was in the range of gas that had escaped to the surface through cracks in the cover plates. A spark from the engine proceed to ignite the gas and set the vehicle on fire. As the driver escaped the burning vehicle, passersby from the downtown afternoon rush gathered to watch the vehicle fire, while ambulances were dispatched to the area. The fire gradually grew and worsened as the gas began to ignite.

At 5:47 pm, a massive explosion occurred from the subway tunnel, rupturing the street above. The explosion was so large and powerful that it completely destroyed around 30 buildings and tossed the concrete slabs covering the tunnel into the air and onto victims. Newspaper reports indicate numerous other explosions in the area occurred shortly after. The emergency response to the explosion was stymied by mass confusion: the Osaka Municipal Fire Department's central dispatch room was being moved to a new building that day, and many victims with less-serious wounds reached hospitals themselves with little information as to what happened or what the full extent of their injuries were. The gas flow to the area was shut off within four hours, and by 9:40 pm firefighters reported the fires caused by the explosion were under control.

Seventy-nine people were killed and 420 others were injured. Reportedly, none of the victims were foreign visitors from Expo '70, which was not affected by the explosion, though the Japan Gas Association's pavilion there was closed for 12 hours afterward. 495 houses and buildings were damaged or destroyed by the explosion and fires.

== Aftermath ==
Prime Minister Eisaku Satō held an emergency meeting of responsible officials in Tokyo on 10 April. Minister of Construction Ryutaro Nemoto and Minister of International Trade and Industry Kiichi Miyazawa visited the site the same day, having been sent there by Satō. The Gas Business Act of 1954 was amended to ensure measures to prevent gas leaks and similar disasters were also followed by all entities working with gas.

The Osaka Prefectural Police began investigating the explosion and deduced the cause was a gas leak. In July 1971, following a criminal investigation, the Osaka Prefectural Police arrested and filed charges of professional negligence against 11 people, including employees of the Osaka City Transportation Bureau, Osaka Gas, and the involved construction company, but their sentences were ultimately suspended or dismissed. Compensation for the victims and destruction totaled ¥590 million and was completed in 1983.

The affected section of the Tanimachi Line was ultimately completed in May 1974. A memorial to the victims was erected in nearby Kokubunji Park.
