= Osaka Municipal Fire Department =

Fire department of Osaka City, Japan

- 大阪市消防局
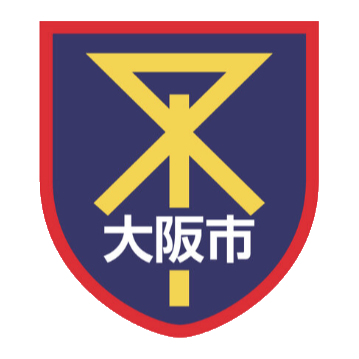
- The medallion used as the logo of the Osaka Municipal Fire Department

Operational area
- Country: Japan
- Prefecture: Osaka
- City: Osaka
- Address: 1–12–54, Kujominami, Nishi-ku
- Coordinates: 34°40′12.8″N 135°28′24.5″E

Agency overview
- Established: 1948
- Annual calls: 263,089 (2023)
- Employees: 3,627 (2020)
- Annual budget: ¥49,347,349,000 (2024)
- Staffing: Career
- Fire Chief: Hiroyuki Hashiguchi (2025)

Facilities and equipment
- Stations: 25
- Branch Stations: 64
- Portable Fire Pumps: 736
- Fire Engines: 152
- Ladder Vehicles: 30
- Chemical Fire Engines: 9
- Ambulances: 98
- Rescue Vehicles: 38
- Command Vehicles: 31
- Specialised Appliances: 71
- Ancillary Vehicles: 52
- Watercraft: 4
- Aircraft: 2

Website
- https://www.city.osaka.lg.jp/shobo/index.html

The Osaka Municipal Fire Department (Japanese: 大阪市消防局, Hepburn: Ōsaka-shi Shōbōkyoku) is the fire department of Osaka City, Japan. Formed in 1948 during the post-war reorganisation of Japan's government, the OMFD is today the third-largest fire department in Japan (behind the Tokyo Fire Department and the Yokohama Fire Bureau) by number of firefighters, operating out of their headquarters in Nishi Ward and the 89 fire stations and branch stations spread across the city.

In the 2023 financial year, the OMFD responded to 707 fires (a 10% increase on the previous year, with building fires making up 77.9% of total fire calls), 263,089 calls for emergency medical services, 4,431 technical rescue operations, and 8,946 other calls for assistance, including hazardous materials, flood prevention, animal rescue incidents, and 6,117 false alarm callouts. The year also saw the OMFD process 6,229 building fire safety plan applications, 62,654 fire safety equipment certification applications, and 6,913 hazardous materials permit applications, as well as inspecting 56,096 pieces of fire safety equipment and delivering 661,443 fire safety visits.

== History ==
Organised firefighting in Osaka was first established in the Edo period in 1643, with the establishment of a buke bikeshi (武家火消) samurai fire brigade, as well as 4 volunteer tana bikeshi (店火消) brigades; over time, the role of the volunteer brigades grew, with them becoming more organised and some professionalising, particularly after receiving formal recognition in the Kyōhō Reforms of 1720. During this period, Osaka was extremely vulnerable to devastating conflagrations; not only were the city's traditional Japanese buildings constructed out of highly flammable wood and paper, but the density of the city allowed for small fires to rapidly spread and grow out of control.

This arrangement continued until Japan passed into the Meiji era, during which the new, more western-style government established traditional career fire brigades across the nation, including in Osaka, when in 1869 ten fire brigades were formed, hiring 500 firefighters between them. These new brigades were short lived, however, as in 1880 responsibility for firefighting passed to the police department, which during this period consolidated a significant amount of control over many aspects of Japanese life; in Osaka, this led to the establishment of 7 brigades spread out over 4 police stations across the city, staffed by 311 police-firefighters.

In 1945, towards the end of the Pacific War, Osaka was firebombed heavily due to its role as one of the principal industrial centres of Japan; the series of eight napalm bombing raids from March to August are believed to have destroyed 310,955 homes, killed 10,383 people, and injured 35,543 more.

Following the end of the war, firefighting in Japan was reorganised, creating the modern municipal fire department system; as a result, the Osaka Municipal Fire Department was created in 1948.

== Stations and apparatus ==
As is typical with Japanese fire departments, the OMFD is split into stations, with one station covering each of Osaka's 24 wards (plus an aquatic station), each consisting of a large main station building as well as several branch stations throughout the ward. The 25 stations are:

- Kita Fire Station
- Miyakojima Fire Station
- Fukushima Fire Station
- Konohana Fire Station
- Chūō Fire Station
- Nishi Fire Station (co-located with the department's headquarters)
- Minato Fire Station
- Taishō Fire Station
- Tennōji Fire Station
- Naniwa Fire Station
- Nishiyodogawa Fire Station
- Yodogawa Fire Station
- Higashiyodogawa Fire Station
- Higashinari Fire Station
- Ikuno Fire Station
- Asahi Fire Station
- Jōtō Fire Station
- Tsurumi Fire Station
- Abeno Fire Station
- Suminoe Fire Station
- Sumiyoshi Fire Station
- Higashisumiyoshi Fire Station
- Hirano Fire Station
- Nishinari Fire Station
- Osaka Acquatic Fire Station

In addition to its 25 stations, the OMFD also operates an aviation unit from Yao Airport in conjunction with the rescue team based at Hirano Fire Station.

The department has a large fleet totalling 487 vehicles, including 429 fire appliances, 52 land vehicles other than fire appliances, 4 watercraft and 2 helicopters; the fire appliance fleet is detailed in the table below.

Vehicle	Image	Number	Notes
Fire Pump Cars Japanese: 消防ポンプ車 Hepburn: Shōbō ponpu-sha		144 Small Tankers (ST); 8 Medium Tankers (MT)	Whereas many Japanese fire departments use pumpers with no tank, all fire pumpers in the OMFD are tank vehicles.
Aerial Work Vehicles Japanese: 高所作業車 Hepburn: Kōsho sagyō-sha		27 Turntable Ladders (L); 3 Hydraulic Platforms (LT)	
Chemical Vehicles Japanese: 化学車 Hepburn: Kagaku-sha		6 Chemical Pumpers (C); 3 Foam Concentrate Transport Vehicles (AT)	(N.B) The vehicle pictured is a Foam Concentrate Transport Vehicle; chemical pumpers are similar in appearance to regular fire pump cars.
Emergency Cars (Ambulances) Japanese: 救急車 Hepburn: Kyūkyū-sha		98 High-Standard Ambulances (A)	
Rescue Vehicles Japanese: 救助車 Hepburn: Kyūjo-sha		24 Rescue Pumpers (R); 1 Air Special Rescue Vehicle (AR); 6 Big Special Rescue Vehicles (BR); 4 Chemical Special Rescue Vehicles (CR); 2 Dive Special Rescue Vehicles (DR); 1 Advanced Special Rescue Vehicle (ASR)	(N.B) The vehicle pictured is a Big Special Rescue Vehicle, designed for technical rescue and USAR operations; other vehicles lack the mounted crane arm and appear simply as a normal fire appliance with side shutters and rescue team-specific markings.
Command Vehicles Japanese: 指揮車 Hepburn: Shiki-sha		26 General Command Vehicles (CC); 5 Area Taskforce Command Vehicles (DC)	
Other Fire Appliances Japanese: その他の消防車両 Hepburn: Sonohoka no shōbō sharyō		4 Rescue Support Vehicles (SR); 4 Rescue Equipment Vehicles (RE); 4 Rescue Work Vehicles (RW); 4 Fuel Supply Cars (SC); 4 "Dragon Boost" Long-Distance Large-Volume Water Transport Vehicles (DB); 33 Public Information Vehicles (PI); 3 Fire Investigation Vehicles; 1 Rescue Guidance Vehicle; 5 Disaster Activity Support Vehicles; 1 Radio Relay Vehicle; 2 Fire Safety Inspection Vehicles	(N.B) The vehicle pictured is a unique type of Rescue Work Vehicle. As well as this Large Blower type, the OMFD maintains a Water Cutter vehicle, a Mass Decontamination vehicle, and a Special Disaster Response (HazMat/CBRN) Vehicle. The Rescue Support Vehicles are designed to fulfil high-expanding foam delivery, mass extraction fan ventilation, and breathing apparatus supply and refilling functions.
Fireboats/Fire Rescue Boats Japanese: 消防艇・消防救助艇 Hepburn: Shōbō-tei・Shōbō kyūjo-tei		2 Large Fireboats (FB); 2 Small Fire and Rescue Boats (FB)	The smaller Fire and Rescue Boats are of a small outboard motor design and are co-located with the Dive Special Rescue units at land-based stations, whereas the large Fireboats are ocean-going ships located at the Aquatic Fire Station dock.
Aircraft Japanese: 航空機 Hepburn: Kōkūki		2 Fire Helicopters (H)	

== Notable incidents ==
As well as contributing to national and international emergencies through participation in the national Emergency Fire Rescue Teams and the International Rescue Team of the Japan Fire Service, the OMFD has tackled various notable emergencies within Osaka, including:

- Tenroku gas explosion (1970) - A gas leak during construction at a metro station lead to a large explosion, killing 79 and injuring 420 others.
- Sennichi Department Store Building fire (1972) - A fire in a crowded department store killed 118 and injured 78 others.
- Osaka movie theatre fire (2008) - An arson attack on an adult video arcade killed 16 and injured 9 others.
- Nishi Umeda Clinic fire (2021) - A suspected arson attack on a psychiatric clinic killed 27 (including the suspect) and injured 1 other.

== In popular culture ==
- Borderline (2014) - a television drama produced by NHK following fictional firefighters of Minami Fire Station.

== See also ==
- Osaka Prefectural Police
- Osaka City Council
