= 2008 Aéreo Ruta Maya crash =

Aviation incident in Guatemala

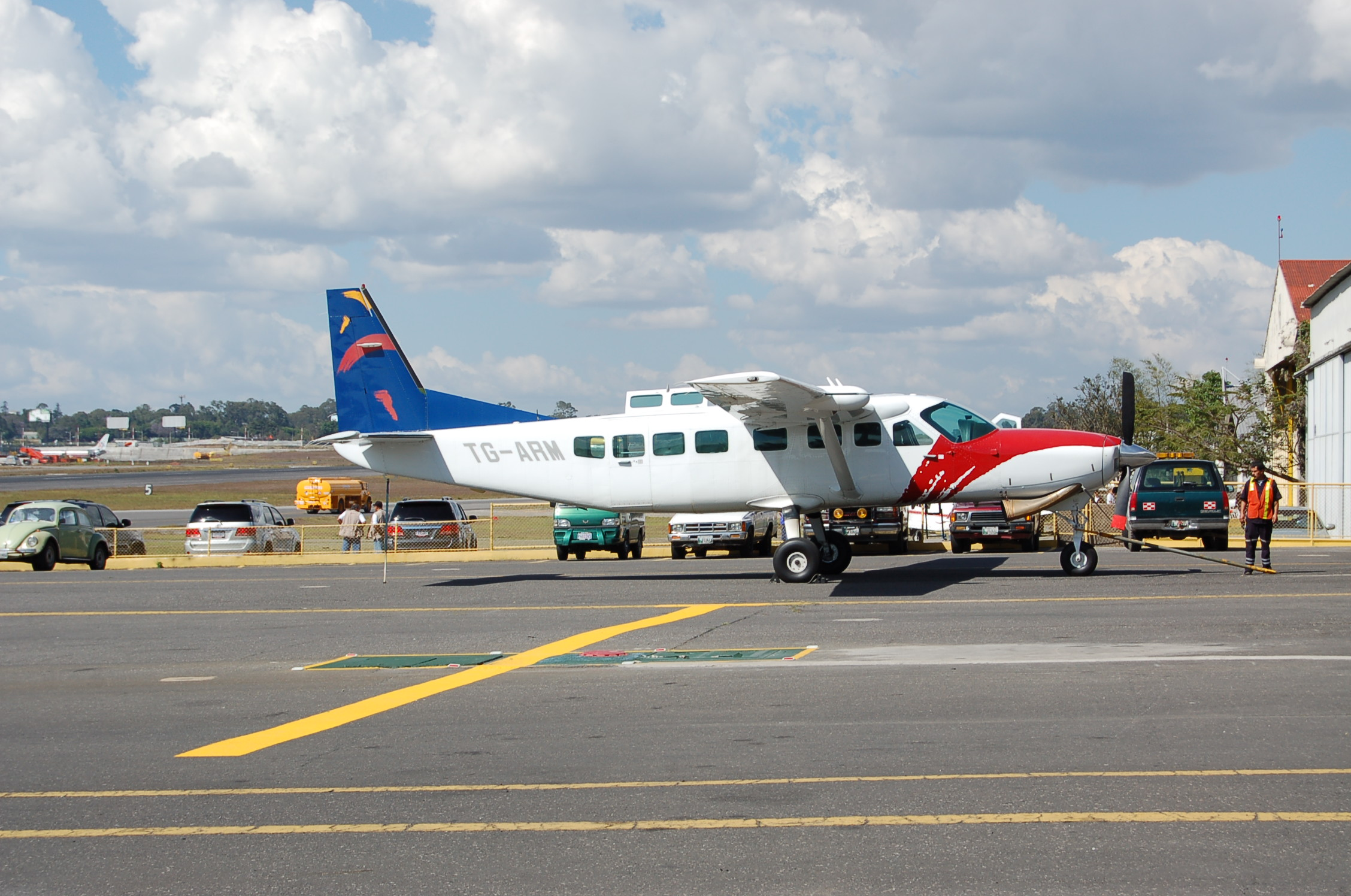
- A Cessna 208 similar to the accident aircraft

Accident
- Date: 24 August 2008
- Summary: Engine failure
- Site: Near Cabañas, Zacapa, 115 km (71 mi) east of Guatemala City; 14.93°N 89.82°W

Aircraft
- Aircraft type: Cessna Caravan 208
- Operator: Aéreo Ruta Maya
- Registration: TG-JCS
- Flight origin: La Aurora International Airport
- Destination: El Estor
- Passengers: 12
- Crew: 2
- Fatalities: 11
- Injuries: 3
- Survivors: 3

On August 24, 2008, an Aéreo Ruta Maya Cessna Caravan 208 carrying 10 American aid workers, two Guatemalan aid agency representatives, pilot and copilot en route from La Aurora International Airport, Guatemala City to El Estor, crashed 45 minutes after takeoff. The crash killed all occupants but three aid workers. The aircraft went down in a field 60 miles east of Guatemala City after the pilot reported an engine failure and was attempting an emergency landing. The aid workers were members of Choice Humanitarian, a West Jordan, Utah based humanitarian group on their way to the village of Sepamac.
