= ARM Aviación =

IATA	ICAO	Call sign
-	MMG	-
- Founded: 1994
- Hubs: La Aurora Int'l Airport
- Headquarters: Guatemala City, Guatemala
- Employees: 200
- Website: armaviacion.com

ARM Aviación (formerly Aéreo Ruta Maya) is a private Guatemalan charter airline based in Zone 13, Guatemala City, with its main hub at La Aurora International Airport.

Founded in 1994, the airline employs approximately 100 people, including 20 pilots. ARM Aviación also operates a maintenance facility at La Aurora International Airport. Their three hangars are located on the east side of the airport. In addition to passenger charters, the airline operates cargo, skydiving, ambulance and agricultural flights.

== Current fleet ==
ARM Aviación's fleet includes:

- 1 Aero Commander 500
- 1 Beechcraft Baron 55
- Cessna Titan C404
- 2 Cessna 208B Grand Caravan
- 3 De Havilland Canada DHC-6 Twin Otter (as of July 2026)
- 1 Embraer 110
- Let L-410 Turbolet
- Pilatus PC-6

== Incidents and Accidents ==
- On August 24, 2008, a Cessna Caravan 208 operated by ARM Aviación (then called Aéreo Ruta Maya) crashed en route from La Aurora International Airport, Guatemala City to El Estor. The pilots performed an emergency landing in a field 60 miles east of Guatemala City after the aircraft suffered an engine failure.
