= Regional Air (Papua New Guinea) =

2002–2005 airline in Papua New Guinea

IATA	ICAO	Call sign
QT	-	-
- Commenced operations: 2002
- Ceased operations: 2005
- Operating bases: Madang Airport, Jacksons International Airport
- Fleet size: 4 de Havilland Canada DHC-6 Twin Otter; 1 Beechcraft Super King Air
- Headquarters: Madang, Papua New Guinea, Australia

Regional Air was an airline based in Madang, Papua New Guinea. It operated scheduled and charter passenger services. Its main bases were Madang Airport and Jacksons International Airport, Port Moresby.

The airline operated from 2002 until 2005, when it was merged into Hevilift.

== Code data ==
- IATA Code: QT

== Fleet ==
As of August 2006 the Regional Air fleet includes:

- 1 de Havilland Canada DHC-6 Twin Otter Series 200
- 3 de Havilland Canada DHC-6 Twin Otter Series 300

As of January 2005 the fleet also includes:

- 1 Raytheon Beech King Air B200
