= Ishigaki Airport =

Airport serving Ishigaki, Okinawa Prefecture, Japan

Ishigaki Airport Ishigaki Kūkō (石垣空港)
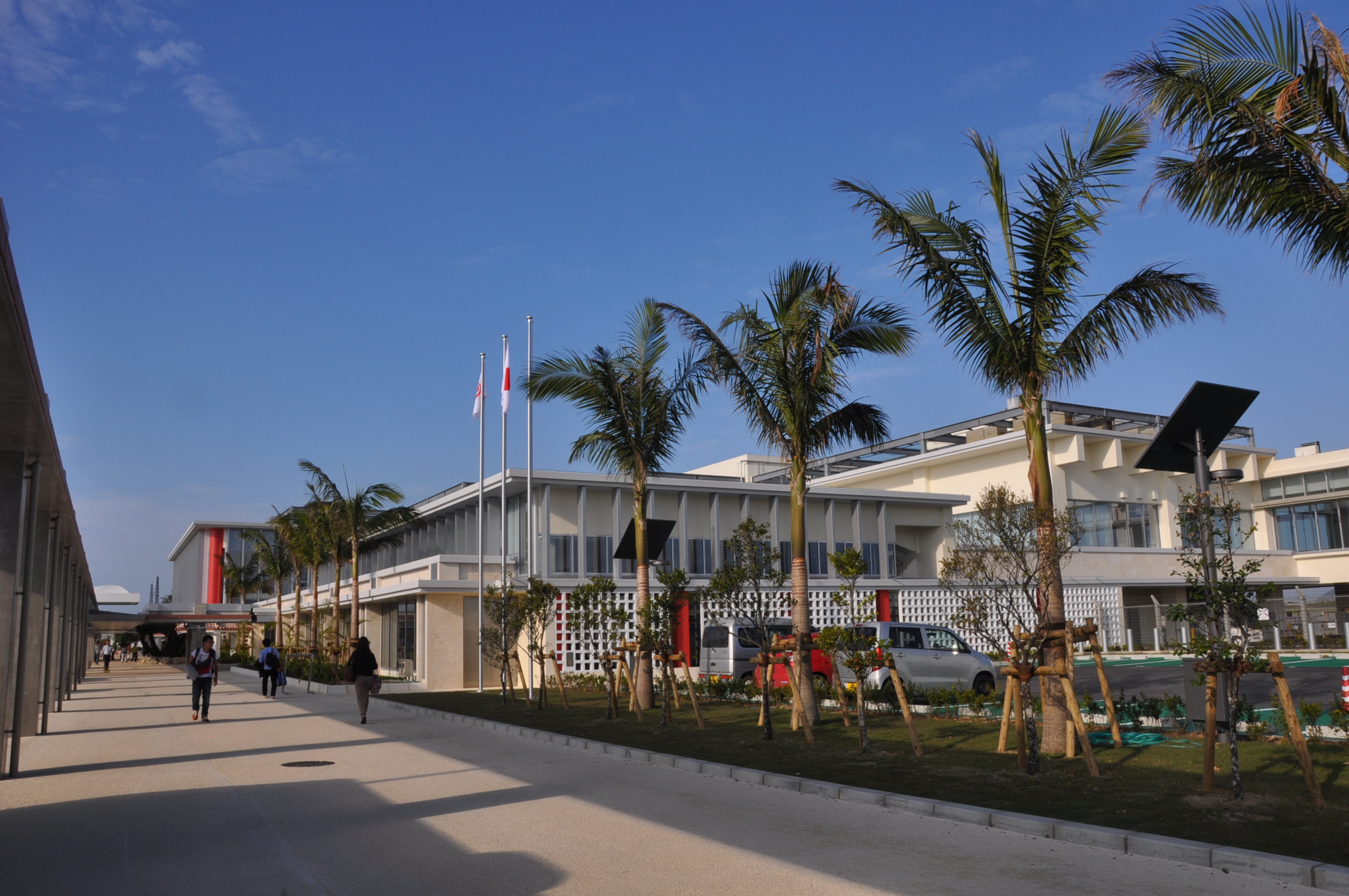
- IATA: ISG; ICAO: ROIG

Summary
- Operator: City of Ishigaki
- Serves: Ishigaki, Yaeyama Islands
- Location: 1960-104-1 Shiraho District, Ishigaki, Okinawa Prefecture, Japan
- Opened: March 7, 2013; 13 years ago
- Elevation AMSL: 102 ft (31 m)
- Coordinates: 24°23′47″N 124°14′42″E
- Website: www.ishigaki-airport.co.jp

Map
- Location within Okinawa Prefecture Location within Japan

Runways
Direction	Length		Surface
Direction	m	ft	Surface
04/22	2,000	6,562	Asphalt concrete

Statistics (2015)
- Passengers (2016): 2,421,529
- Cargo (metric tonnes): 18,690
- Aircraft movement: 24,834
- Source: Japanese Ministry of Land, Infrastructure, Transport and Tourism

Ishigaki Airport (Note: Japanese: 石垣空港, Hepburn: Ishigaki Kūkō) (IATA: ISG, ICAO: ROIG) (formerly known as New Ishigaki Airport (Note: Japanese: 新石垣空港, Hepburn: Shin-Ishigaki Kūkō)) also branded as Painushima Ishigaki Airport, (Note: Japanese: 南ぬ島石垣空港, Hepburn: Painushima Ishigaki Kūkō; "Southern Island Ishigaki Airport") (Note: The phrase "pai nu" comes from the Yaeyama language.) is a regional airport located in the Shiraho district of Ishigaki, Okinawa Prefecture, Japan. The airport is located near the eastern coast of Ishigaki Island. On 7 August 2025 Okinawa Prefecture changed its official name to Ishigaki Airport. It connects the island to major cities in Japan as well as destinations throughout Okinawa Prefecture and the Yaeyama Islands. Ishigaki Airport was built to replace the former Ishigaki Airport, which the shorter runway of only 1,500 metres (4,900 ft), could not accommodate larger jets and the airport was surrounded with buildings and residential area.

Operations at the old Ishigaki Airport ceased at midnight on March 6, 2013, and New Ishigaki Airport opened on March 7, 2013. It opened under the name New Ishigaki Airport, and on August 7, 2025, it was renamed Ishigaki Airport.

Yaeyama Islands are in the spotlight as World Heritage islands and year-round tropical resort destination, and the airport serves more than 2.6 million people each year. Congestion at the airport has become a serious problem, so construction was completed to triple the size of the international terminal in 2022. The city authorities and Okinawa Prefecture are planning to extend the runway to 2,800 meters to meet the flight requests of airlines.

== Location ==
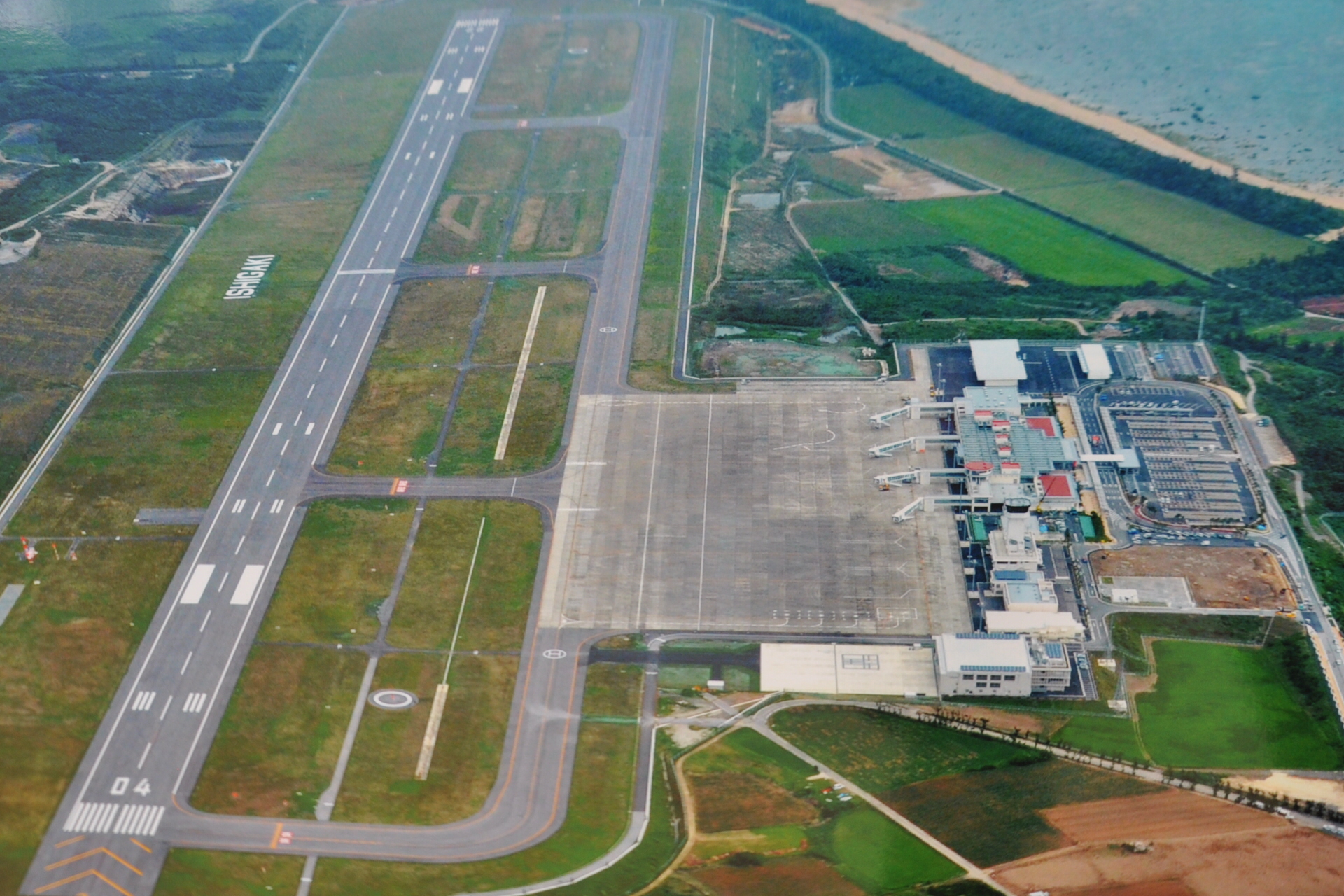
Aerial view of Ishigaki Airport

Ishigaki Airport is located on the eastern shore of Ishigaki Island (221 square kilometres (85 mi^{2})). The island is located approximately 430 kilometres (270 mi) southwest of Okinawa Island. The Yaeyama Islands were traditionally controlled from the southern district of the island, and remains the chief island of the group.

The airport serves as a transportation hub for the surrounding Miyako, Yonaguni, Hateruma, and Tarama islands. The airport additionally connects Ishigaki to Tokyo (via Haneda Airport), Nagoya, Osaka, Hiroshima, and Fukuoka. Ishigaki is only a 40-minute flight from Taiwan Taoyuan International Airport (TPE) in Taiwan. Ishigaki currently hosts seasonal flights to Taiwan.

Ishigaki Airport sits 31 metres (102 ft) above sea level in the Shiraho district of Ishigaki. The airport is located approximately 30 minutes by car from central Ishigaki City (i.e., Ishigaki Harbor).

== Facilities ==
Ishigaki Airport covers 143 hectares (350 acres). It consists of a single runway, 2,000 metres (6,600 ft) in length and 45 metres (148 ft) in width. The airport has a single terminal with a total floor space of 12,560 square metres (135,200 ft^{2}). The first floor of the terminal is used for check-in and baggage claim. The second floor is used as an entrance, the third floor for facilities management, and the fourth floor as an observation deck. Ishigaki Airport operates 11 hours a day, between 8 am and 7 pm.

== Administration ==
Under the Airport Law of 1956 New Ishigaki Airport was originally classified as a Regional Airport (the old airport was classified as Third Class airport). According to a September 4, 2013, front-page article in the Yaeyama Mainichi Shinbun (one of the newspapers in Ishigaki), the airport is now classified as an International Airport, which means that Taiwanese carriers will change from a system of providing what they call "regular charter flights" to offering regular scheduled flights.

Ishigaki Airport was constructed by government of Okinawa Prefecture at a cost of 45.1 trillion yen and is now owned and operated by the City of Ishigaki. The airport has 24 tenants, mainly locally operated restaurants and souvenir shops.

== History ==
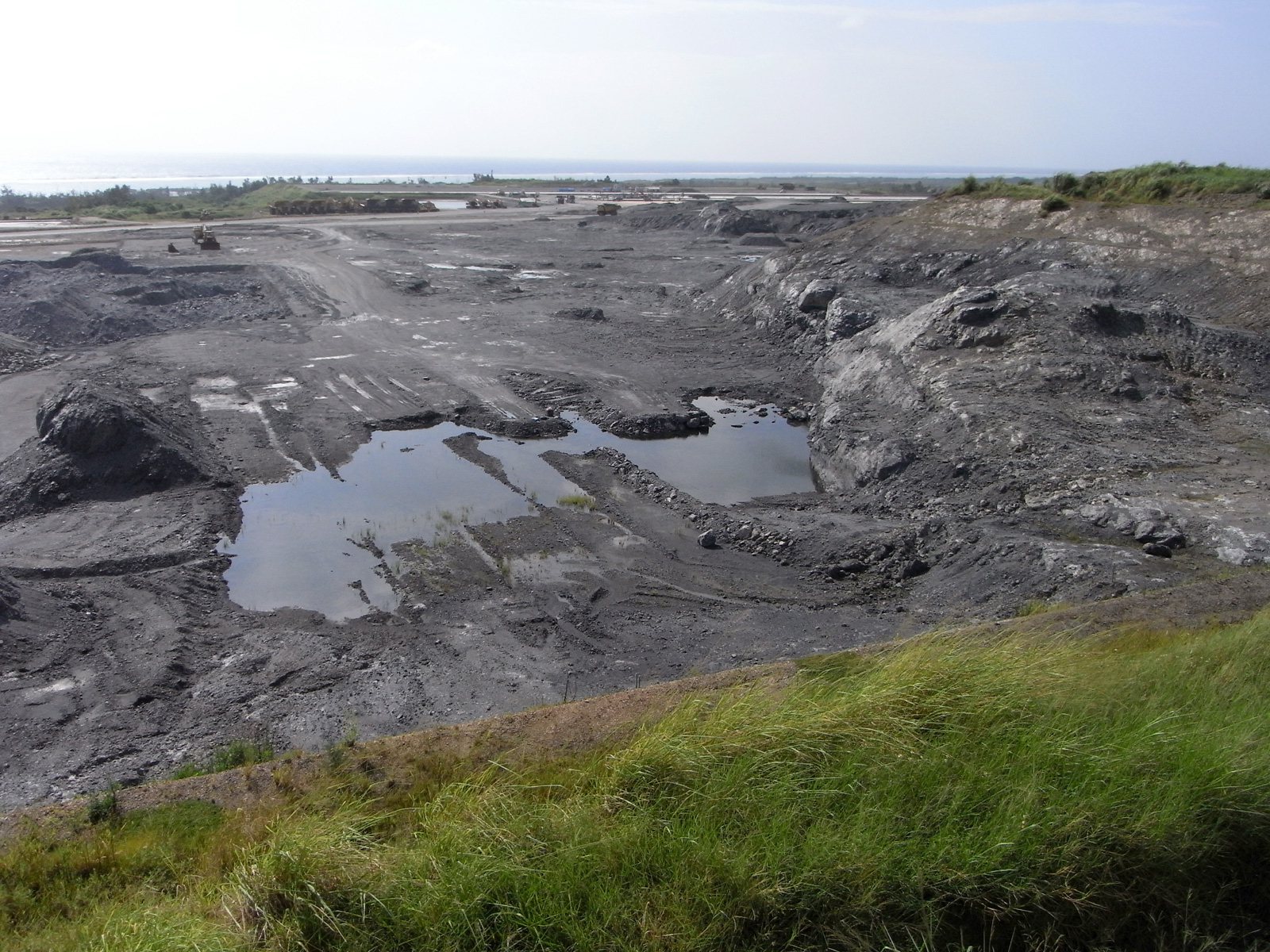
Construction site of Ishigaki Airport, 2009

Before the current Ishigaki Airport opened, Ishigaki Airport was the airport serving the city which was originally built during World War II as a military airstrip by the Imperial Japanese Army. (Note: Some sources date the completion of the military airstrip to 1942, others to 1943.) Korean laborers were used for the construction of the military airstrip. The airstrip was built in the Maezato and Ōhama districts of Ishigaki, and opened in September 1942. The airstrip was used for the deployment of kamikaze units to attack American ships anchored off Okinawa Island during the Battle of Okinawa.

After World War II the airstrip was repaired, and eventually converted to joint civilian/military use in 1956, and commercial flights to Ishigaki began on June 16 of that year. The new airport was built to replace Ishigaki Airport, which had a runway of only 1,500 metres (4,900 ft), and could generally accommodate small jets, typically a 150-passenger Boeing 737. The initial plan called for an airport to be built on extensive landfill off the eastern shore of the island in the Shiraho district. Plans for a new airport on the Ishigaki Island date back to 1979.

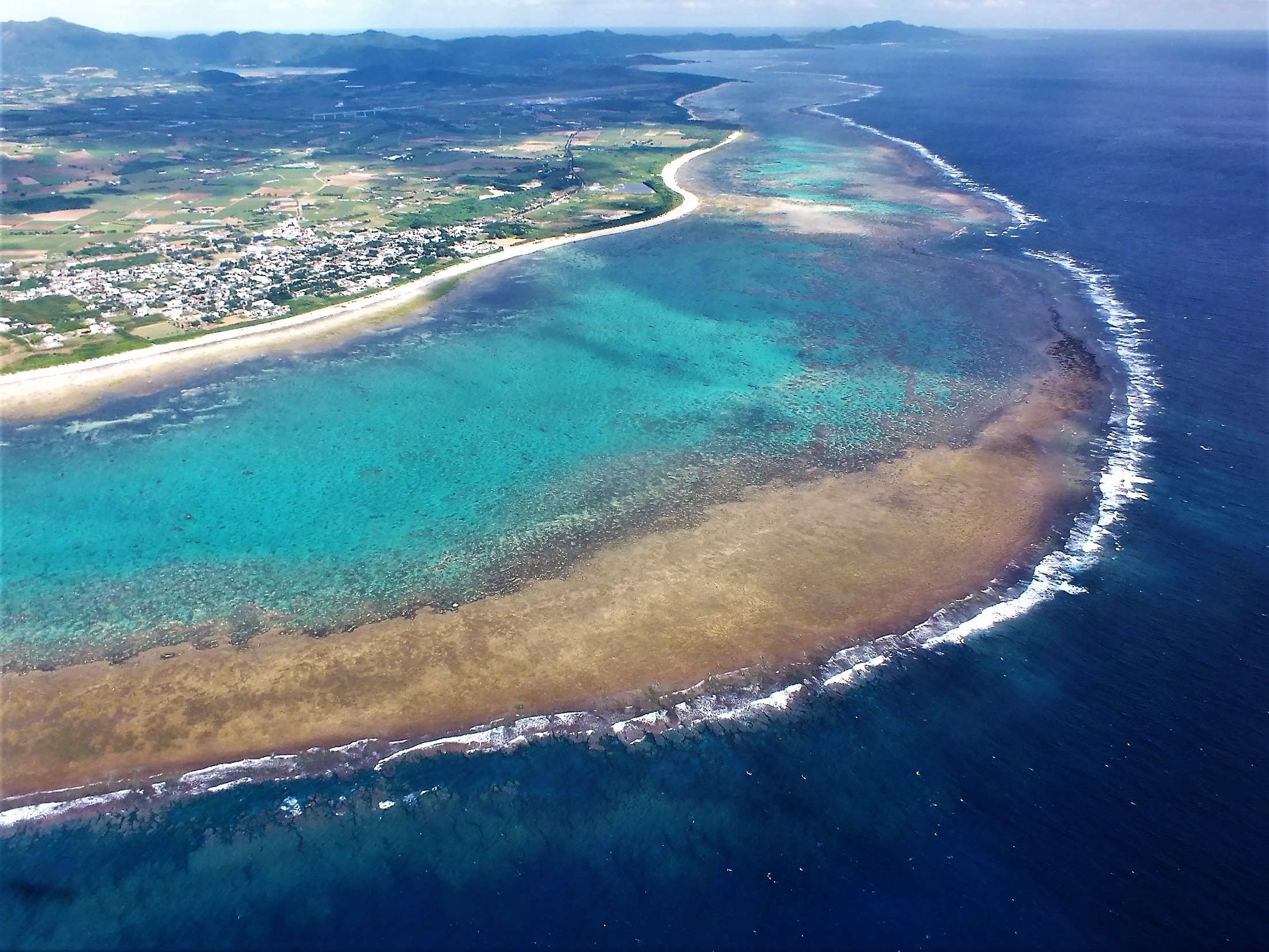
Shiraho Coral Reef, original site for the airport

Residents of Shiraho opposed the construction of Ishigaki Airport, among other reasons, due to concerns about the destruction of the Shiraho Coral Reef. The 10 kilometres (6.2 mi) reef is home to over 120 species of coral, and is one of the most diverse coral reefs in Japan, and is named as one of the "Global 200" coral reefs by the World Wildlife Fund. The Shiraho district and its reef is protected as part of Iriomote-Ishigaki National Park (205.69 square kilometres (79.42 mi^{2})), which covers both the land and marine areas of much of the Yaeyama Islands. The Shiraho reef is particularly vulnerable to destruction by red clay discharged from small rivers and other discharge from Ishigaki Island. This plan was abandoned in 1989.

A second plan, which was ultimately adopted, called for the airport to be built inland from the coast, using both agricultural land and excavating a section from Karadake, a prominent 135.9 metres (446 ft) hill on the relatively flat landscape of Ishigaki Island. Construction on the new airport started in 2006 with the excavation of Karadake. 270,000 ha² of soil from Karadake were removed, significantly changing the appearance of the landscape of Shiraho. The excavation of Karadake posed a continuing threat to the Shiraho coral reef. The hill is composed of red clay, and discharge of soil from the excavation presented a serious threat of destruction of the reef.

Human remains, now known as the Shiraho Saonetabaru Cave Ruins, were discovered at the site shortly after construction began on the airport. Bones from human heads, feet, arms were found and dated to the Paleolithic Age, and are approximately 24,000 years old. The remains may be the oldest human remains found in Japan. Work at the archaeological site ended with the opening of the airport in 2013.

As a promotion prior to the opening of the airport and the locally produced Ishigaki beef, a giant kebab was constructed on the construction area of the new airport. Assembly of the kebab required the effort of 1,700 residents and tourists, and ultimately measured 107.6 metres (353 ft) in length. The kebab was certified a Guinness World Record, beating out the former record-holder constructed in Lebanon.

Ishigaki Airport is designated a Regional Airport (地方管理空港, Chihō Kanri Kūkō) under the Airport Law of Japan. An opening ceremony for the airport was held on March 2, 2013. Operations at Ishigaki Airport ceased at midnight on March 6, 2013, and airport equipment such as luggage carts and handling equipment were trucked across the island overnight. Ishigaki Airport officially started operations at 12 a.m., March 7, 2013.

== Airlines and destinations ==
Airlines	Destinations
All Nippon Airways	Nagoya–Centrair, Tokyo–Haneda
ANA Wings	Miyako, Naha
China Airlines	Taipei–Taoyuan
HK Express	Hong Kong
Japan Airlines	Tokyo–Haneda
Japan Transocean Air	Naha, Osaka–Kansai
Jin Air	Seoul–Incheon
Peach	Fukuoka, Osaka–Kansai, Tokyo–Narita
Ryukyu Air Commuter	Miyako, Naha, Yonaguni
Solaseed Air	Naha
Tigerair Taiwan	Kaohsiung, Taipei–Taoyuan

== Ground transportation ==
Ishigaki Airport is connected to other areas of Ishigaki Island by bus and taxi. Ishigaki is served by the Azuma Bus Company. Additionally, a rental car service is available at the airport. The airport sits along Okinawa Prefectural Route 39, which crosses the eastern and southern coast of the island.
