= Yao Airport =

Yao Airport Osaka/Yao Airport
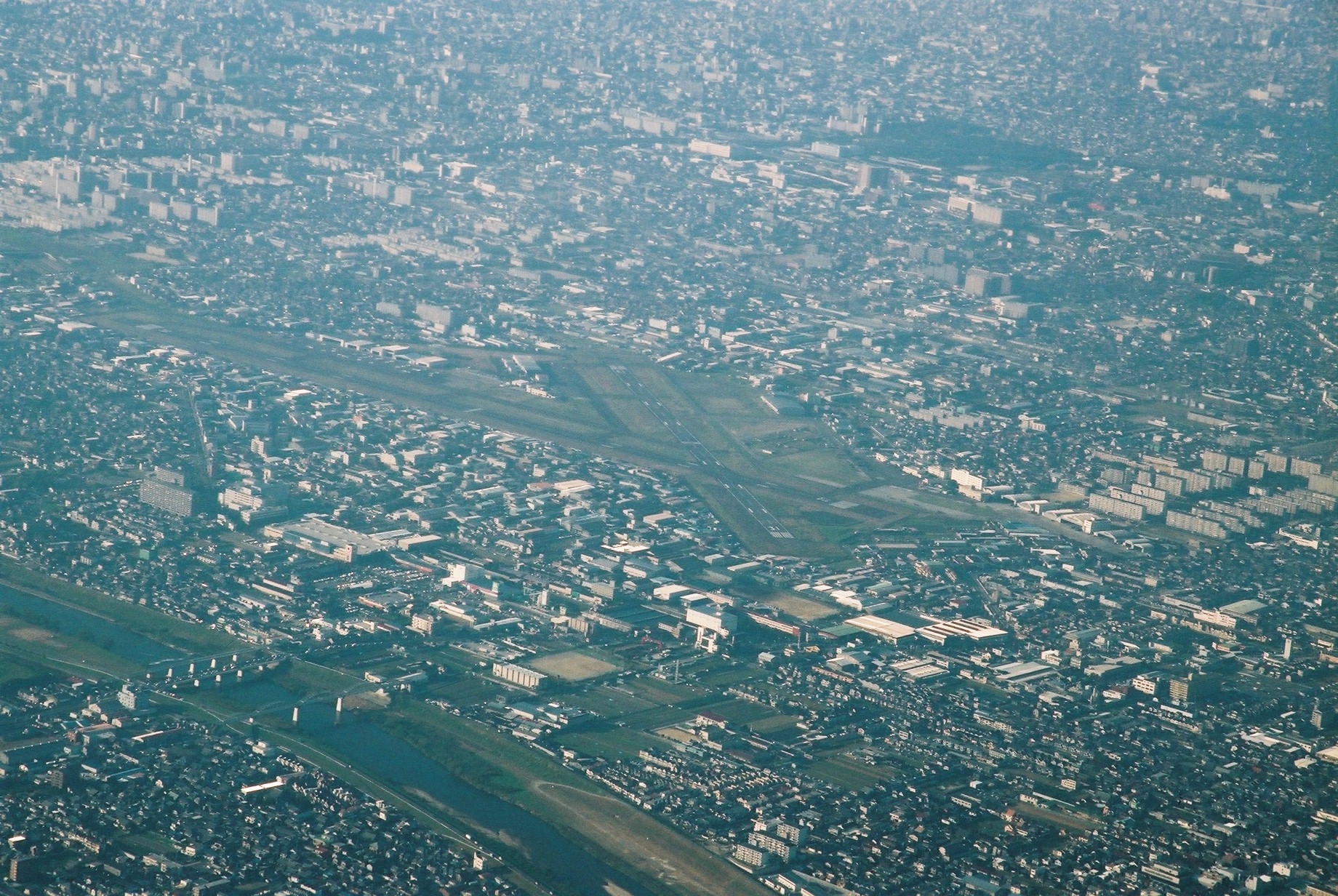
- IATA: none; ICAO: RJOY

Summary
- Airport type: Public
- Operator: Ministry of Land, Infrastructure and Transport
- Serves: Osaka
- Location: Yao
- Elevation AMSL: 33 ft / 10 m
- Coordinates: 34°35′08″N 135°36′02″E

Map
- Location in Japan RJOY (Japan)

Runways
Direction	Length		Surface
Direction	m	ft	Surface
09/27	1,490	4,888	Asphalt/concrete
13/31	1,200	3,937	Asphalt concrete
- Source: Japanese AIP at AIS Japan

Yao Airport (八尾空港, Yao Kūkō; ICAO: RJOY) is a general aviation airport in Yao, Osaka Prefecture, Japan. Located 8.1 NM (15.0 km; 9.3 mi) southeast of Ōsaka Station, it is also a home for the Japan Ground Self-Defense Force Middle Army Aviation Group, Osaka Prefectural Police Aviation Corps, and Osaka Municipal Fire Department Helicopter Unit.

Several small carriers, including Asahi Airlines and Hankyu Airlines, offer sightseeing and charter flights from Yao.

Yao is the only Regional/Second Class airport in Japan without scheduled airline services.

== History ==
The airport started as Hanshin Aviation School in 1938. Two years later, the airfield was seized by the army as the Taishō Airfield and expanded. After World War II, the occupation forces called it the Hanshin Airfield before it was returned to Japanese control.

== Operations ==
=== Self-Defense Forces ===
The Japan Ground Self-Defense Force operates a base at the airport, JGSDF Camp Yao (八尾駐屯地). Units based at Camp Yao include:

- Middle Army Aviation Group (中部方面航空隊) units (other than 5th Anti-Tank Helicopter Group (第５対戦車ヘリコプター隊) which is based in Mie Prefecture):
  - Middle Army Aviation Group HQ (中部方面航空隊本部付隊)
  - Middle Army Helicopters (中部方面ヘリコプター隊) - UH-1 and OH-1 transport/observation helicopters
  - Middle Army Air Traffic Control and Weather (中部方面管制気象隊)
  - Middle Army Air Fleet Maintenance (中部方面航空野整備隊)
- 3rd Aviation Group (第３飛行隊) - UH-1 and OH-6 transport/observation helicopters

=== Osaka Prefecture ===
The Osaka Prefectural Police Aviation Corps operates Bell 206 LongRanger, Bell 412 EP, Eurocopter EC135 P1 and P3, and two AgustaWestland AW139 helicopters from Yao.

=== Osaka City ===
The Osaka Municipal Fire Department operates two Eurocopter AS365 Dauphin helicopters from Yao. They are primarily used for firefighting within the city of Osaka but were dispatched overseas to assist with the 1991 Bangladesh cyclone and the 2004 Indian Ocean earthquake and tsunami.
