= Ishigaki Airport (1943) =

Former airport of Ishigaki, Okinawa, Japan (1943–2013)

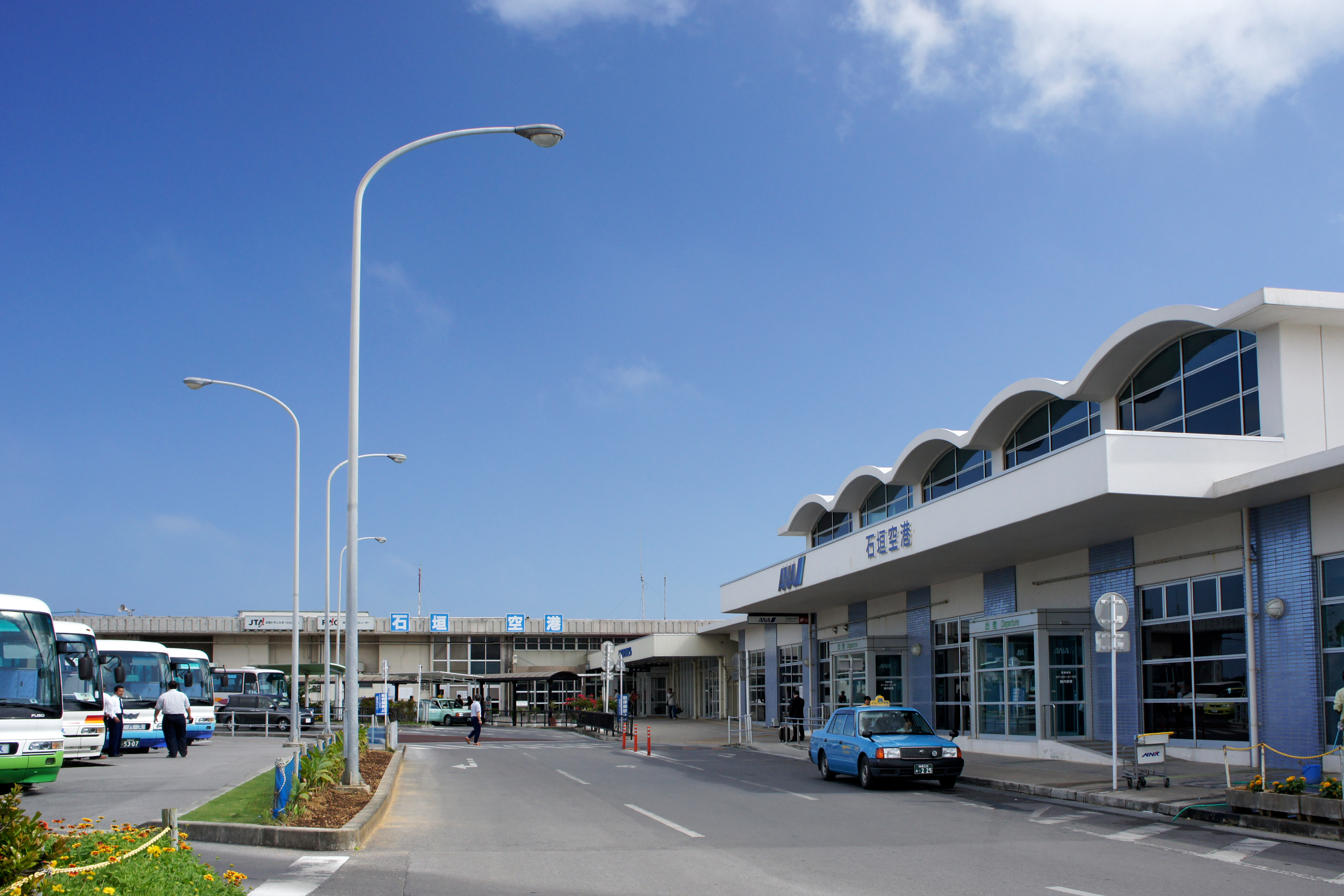
- IATA: ISG; ICAO: ROIG

Summary
- Airport type: Defunct
- Operator: Ministry of Land, Infrastructure and Transport
- Location: Ishigaki, Okinawa, Japan
- Opened: 1943
- Closed: 6 March 2013
- Elevation AMSL: 86 ft (26 m)
- Coordinates: 24°20′41″N 124°11′13″E

Map
- Location in Japan

Runways
Direction	Length		Surface
Direction	m	ft	Surface
04/22	1,500	4,921	Asphalt concrete (Closed)
- Source: Japanese AIP at AIS Japan

Ishigaki Airport (石垣空港, Ishigaki Kūkō), (IATA: ISG, ICAO: ROIG) was a third-class airport located 1 NM (1.9 km; 1.2 mi) from Ishigaki city centre in Okinawa Prefecture, Japan. The airport provided flights to major cities on the Japanese mainland as well as destinations throughout Okinawa Prefecture and the Yaeyama Islands. Commercial operations at Ishigaki Airport ceased at 00:00 on 6 March 2013, and the New Ishigaki Airport opened on 7 March 2013. As of mid-2013, the possibility exists that the airport may be turned over fully to the Japanese Self-Defense Forces. As a Type-3 airport, the JSDF was already in theory able to carry out operations from Ishigaki.

== History ==
The airport was opened in 1943 for military use, and converted to a civilian airport in 1956. The runway was extended from 1,200 to 1,500 m (3,937 to 4,921 ft) in 1968, allowing YS-11 aircraft to land.

== Accidents ==
- On August 26, 1982, Southwest Air Lines Flight 611 overran the runway on landing at Ishigaki. All 138 people on board survived, but the aircraft was destroyed.

== Replacement ==
The airport served about 1.8 million passengers a year, making it the second busiest third-class airport in Japan, behind Kobe Airport, and traffic grew steadily as the Yaeyama Islands become a popular tourist destination. The runway of Ishigaki Airport could not accommodate planes larger than a Boeing 737, and the present site was not suitable for expansion due to urban encroachment. The airport also did not have facilities for handling standard cargo containers.

To meet these needs, New Ishigaki Airport was constructed on the eastern side of the island to replace the first Ishigaki Airport. Plans for the new airport dated to 1979, when the prefectural government planned to build a 2,500 m (8,202 ft) runway by the shore of the Shiraho (白保) district. However, due to concerns about coral, the residents of Shiraho long opposed the project. In addition, historical artifacts from the Shiraho Saonetabaru Cave Ruins some 18,000 to 15,000 years old were discovered, affecting the timeline of the project.

The new airport has a 2,000 m (6,562 ft) runway, expandable to 2,500 m (8,202 ft). Construction started in October 2006, and the new airport opened in 2013.
