= Airport Act =

Japanese law passed in 1956

Airport Law 空港法 Kūkō Hō

Diet of Japan
- Territorial extent: Japan
- Enacted: April 20, 1956
- Status: In force

The Airport Law (空港法, Kūkō Hō) of Japan covers matters concerning the establishment, management, and sharing of airport costs, and contribute to promoting development of civil aviation. The law was passed as Law No. 80 on April 20, 1956, as the Airport Development Law (空港整備法, Kūkō Seibi Hō). The Airport Development Law was significantly revised on June 18, 2008, and renamed the Airport Law.
