= Miyakojima Airport =

Miyakojima Airport may refer to one of the following airports serving Miyakojima, Okinawa Prefecture, Japan:

- Shimojishima Airport
- Miyako Airport
