= Ryukyu Air Commuter =

Regional airline of Japan

Ryukyu Air Commuter Co., Ltd. 琉球エアーコミューター株式会社 Ryūkyū Eā Komyūtā Kabushiki-gaisha

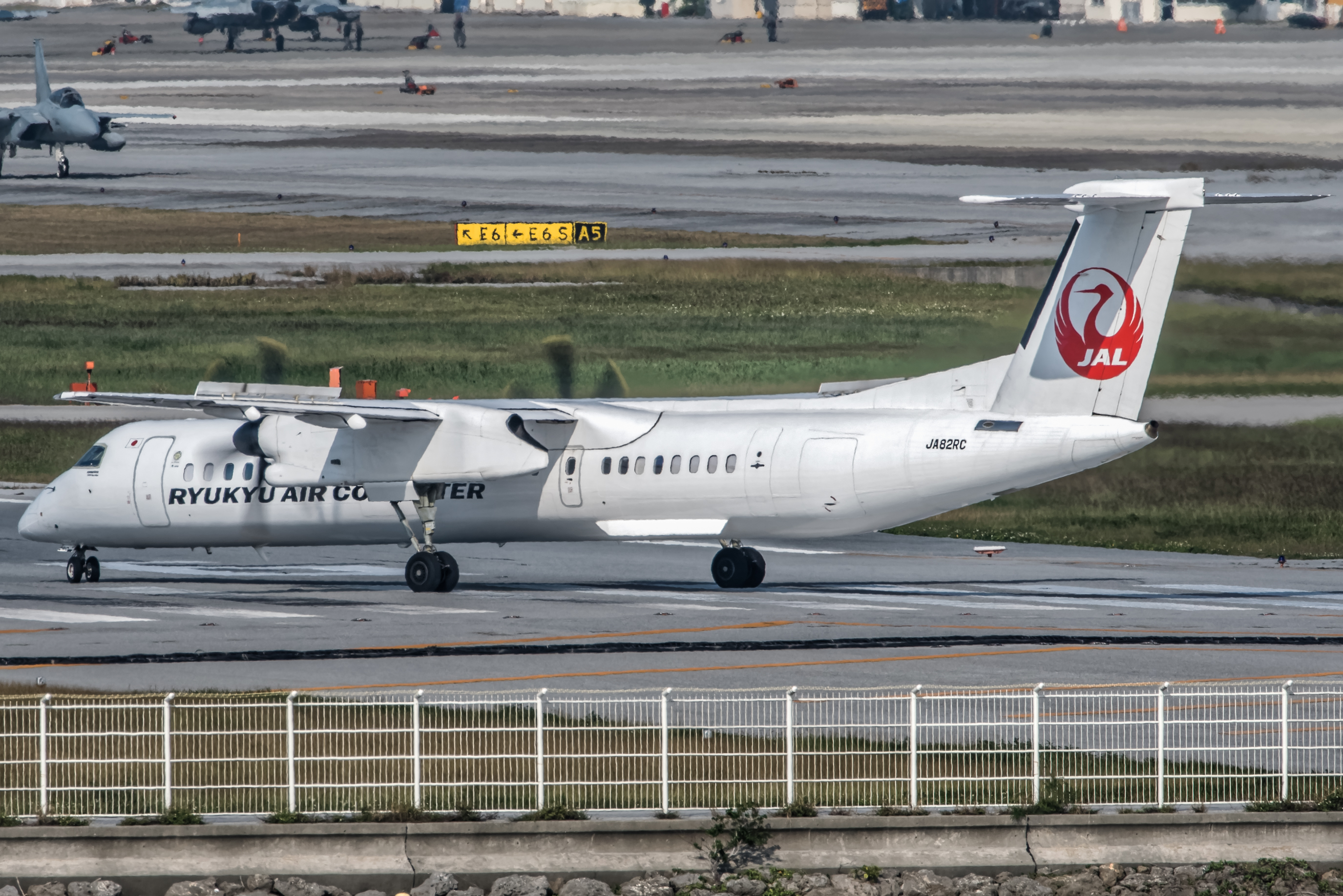
IATA	ICAO	Call sign
RC	RAC	RYUKYU
- Founded: December 24, 1985; 40 years ago
- Commenced operations: February 17, 1987; 39 years ago
- Hubs: Naha Airport
- Fleet size: 5
- Destinations: 9
- Parent company: Japan Transocean Air (74.5%)
- Headquarters: Naha, Okinawa Prefecture, Japan
- Key people: Susumu Namihira (President & CEO)
- Website: www.rac-okinawa.com

Ryukyu Air Commuter (RAC) is a Japanese regional airline headquartered in Naha, Okinawa Prefecture, Japan. It operates domestic passenger services from the island of Okinawa to other islands of Okinawa Prefecture and the Amami Islands, Kagoshima Prefecture. It is owned by Japan Transocean Air (74.5%), Okinawa Prefecture (6.3%), Minamidaitō (4.8%) Kumejima (4.3%) Kitadaitō (4.0%) and other shareholders (6.1%).

== History ==
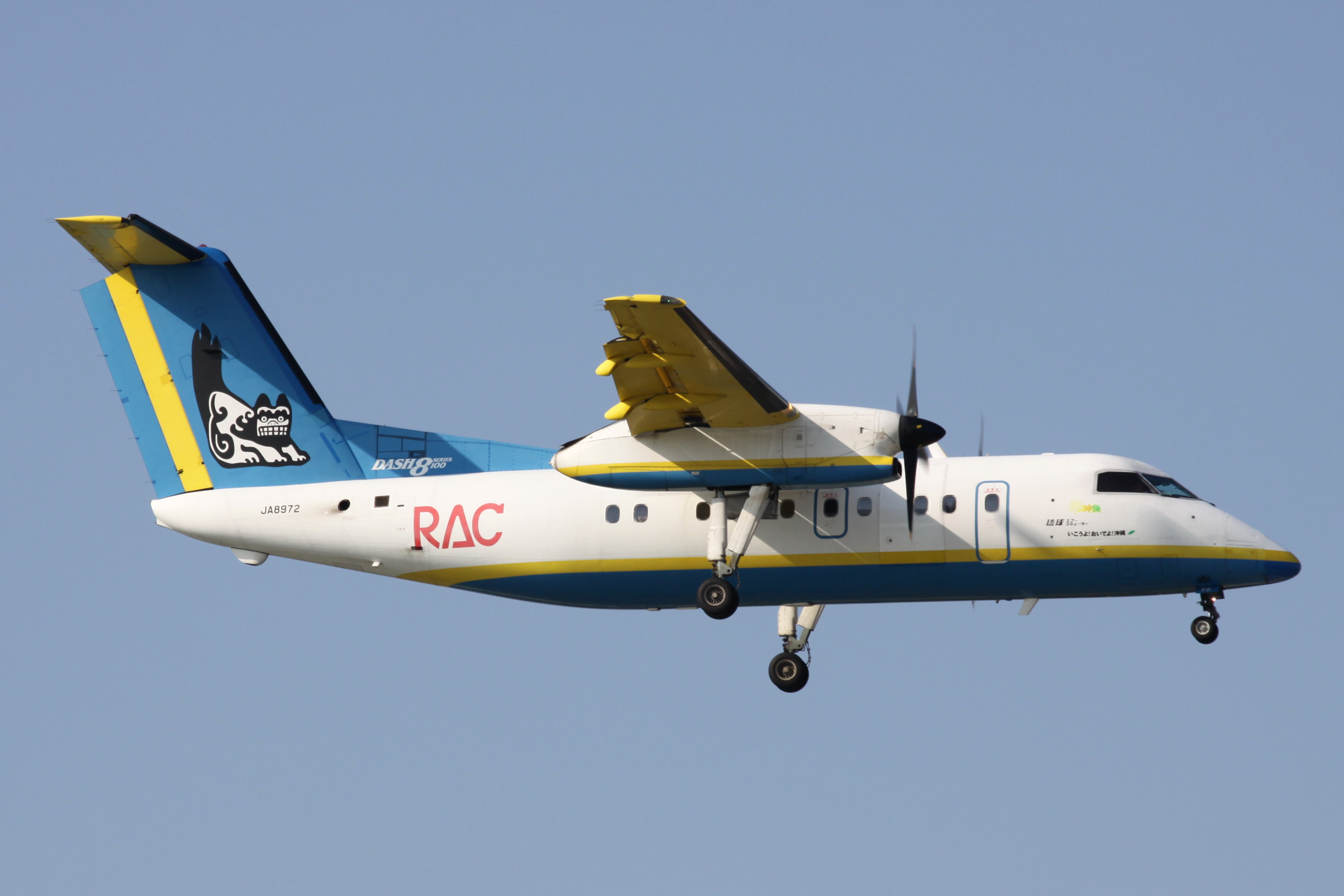
A RAC Bombardier Dash 8 100 in the old livery (2009)

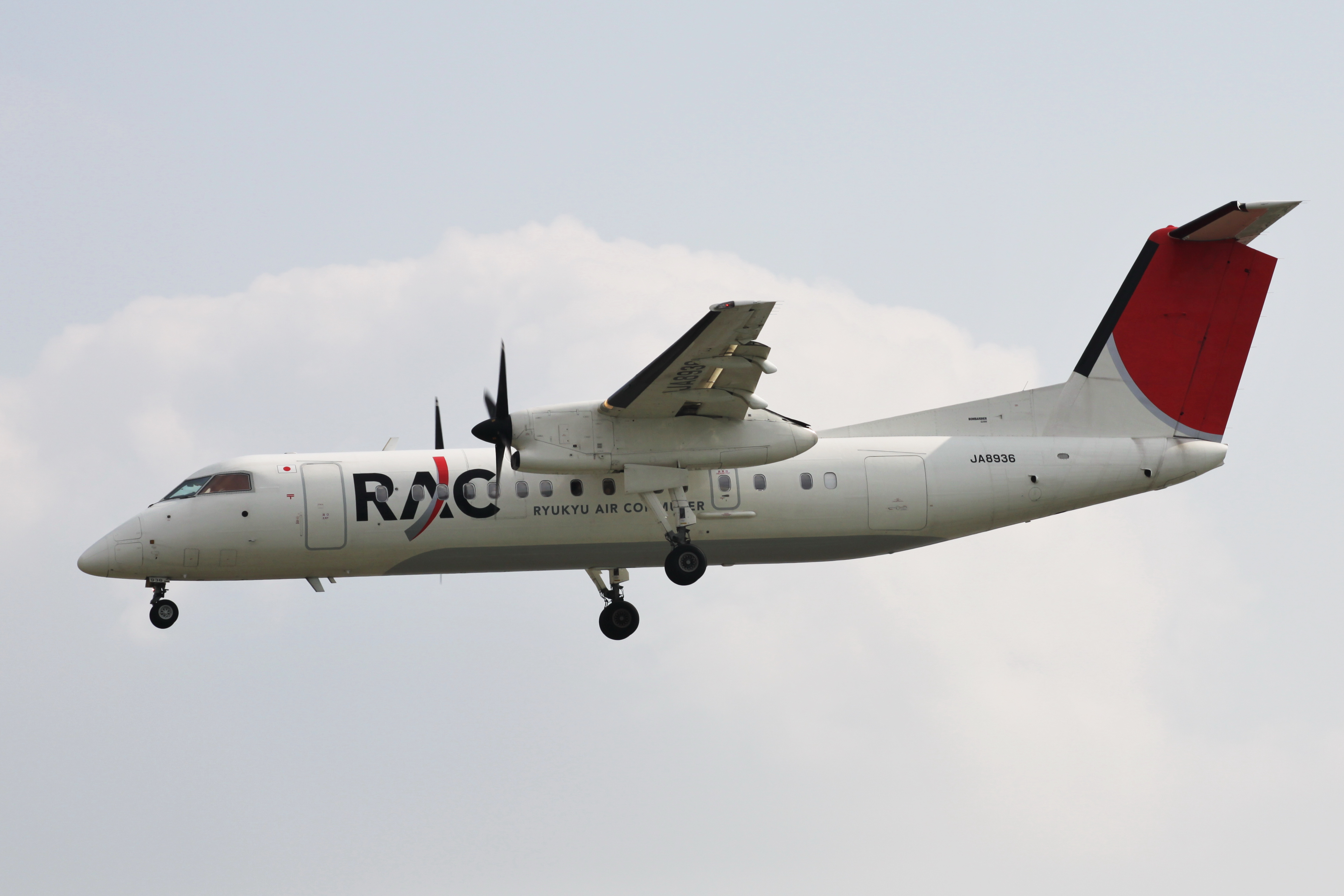
A RAC Bombardier Dash 8 Q300 (2009)

Ryuku Air Commuter was established on December 24, 1985, with help from joint investments from the local government and local businesses. The following year they received the air transport license and the airline started operating flights between Naha and Kerama on the 17th of February 1987. This route was operated with a Britten-Norman BN-2B Islander seating up to nine people. The next route introduced by the airline was from Naha to Aguni and commenced on December 20, 1989.

On November 16, 1992, Ryuku Air Commuter took over two De Havilland Canada DHC-6 Twin Otter aircraft from Japan Transocean Air (then known as 'Southwest Air Lines'), with a capacity of 19 seats this aircraft type had a significantly higher capacity than the BN-2B. With the introduction of these new aircraft, the airline was able to increase its operations and also operate out of other airports than just Naha. With this growth in the operations the airline started to grow into a commuter airline with wide network of the islands within the prefecture, with the main hub being from the island of Okinawa (Naha Airport).

As a replacement for the DHC-6 Twin Otter the DeHavilland Bombardier Dash 8 100 (DHC-8-100) was introduced in 1997, allowing for even greater capacity by seating up to 39 seats. With this larger aircraft the airline started two new routes that same year from Naha to Yoron and Kumejima.

In the following years the airline would see an expansion of their network throughout the Okinawa Prefecture and expanding their fleet with more modern variants of the DHC-8 aircraft. In 2015, the airline signed a firm purchase agreement for five Bombardier Dash 8-Q400 passenger/cargo combi aircraft, following the signing of a Memorandum of Understanding in 2014. It became the launch customer for this new variant aircraft upon delivery in 2016. The final Bombardier Dash 8-Q300 flight was on 31 January 2018.

== Destinations ==
Scheduled destinations (as of November 2019):

City	IATA	ICAO	Airport	Notes	Refs
Amami	ASJ	RJKA	Amami Airport	Terminated	
Hateruma	HTR	RORH	Hateruma Airport	Terminated	
Ishigaki	ISG	ROIG	New Ishigaki Airport		
Kitadaitō	KTD	RORK	Kitadaitō Airport		
Kumejima	UEO	ROKJ	Kumejima Airport		
Minami-Daito	MMD	ROMD	Minami-Daito Airport		
Miyakojima	MMY	ROMY	Miyako Airport		
Naha	OKA	ROAH	Naha Airport	Hub	
Tarama	TRA	RORT	Tarama Airport		
Yonaguni	OGN	ROYN	Yonaguni Airport		
Yoron	RNJ	RORY	Yoron Airport		
Zamami	KJP	ROKR	Kerama Airport	Terminated	

== Fleet ==
=== Current fleet ===
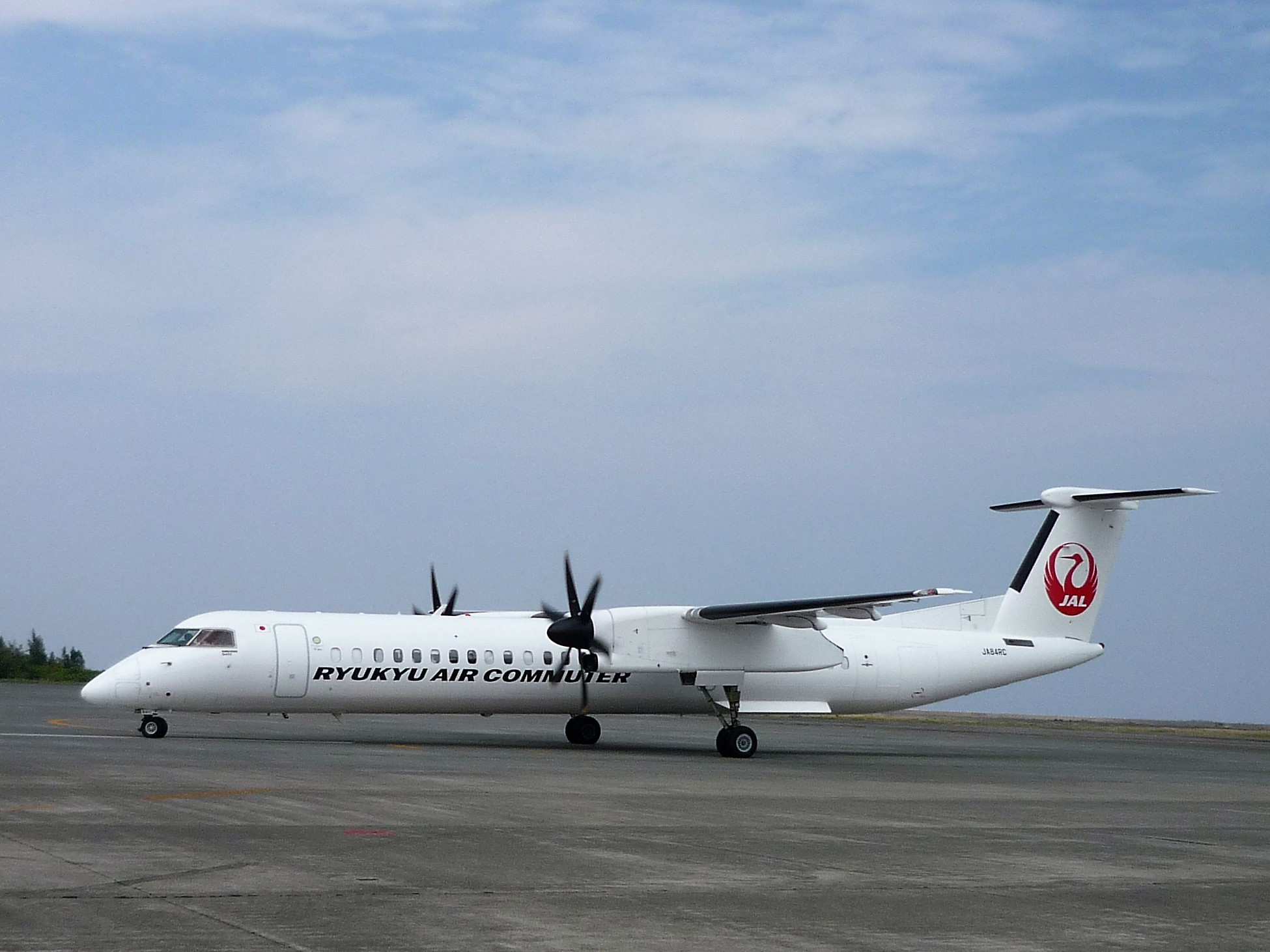
RAC Bombardier Dash 8-Q400 Combi

As of July 2026, Ryukyu Air Commuter operates the following aircraft:

Ryukyu Air Commuter fleet
Aircraft	In Fleet	Orders	Passengers
De Havilland Dash 8 Q400 Combi	5	—	50 + Cargo
Total	5	—	

=== Former fleet ===
As of August 2025, Ryukyu Air Commuter operated 5 De Havilland Canada DHC-8-400.

Ryukyu Air Commuter has also previously operated the following aircraft:

- Britten-Norman BN-2 Islander
- De Havilland Canada Dash 8-100
- De Havilland Dash 8-300
