= Shimojishima Airport =

Airport serving Shimojishima, Okinawa Prefecture, Japan

Shimojishima Airport 下地島空港
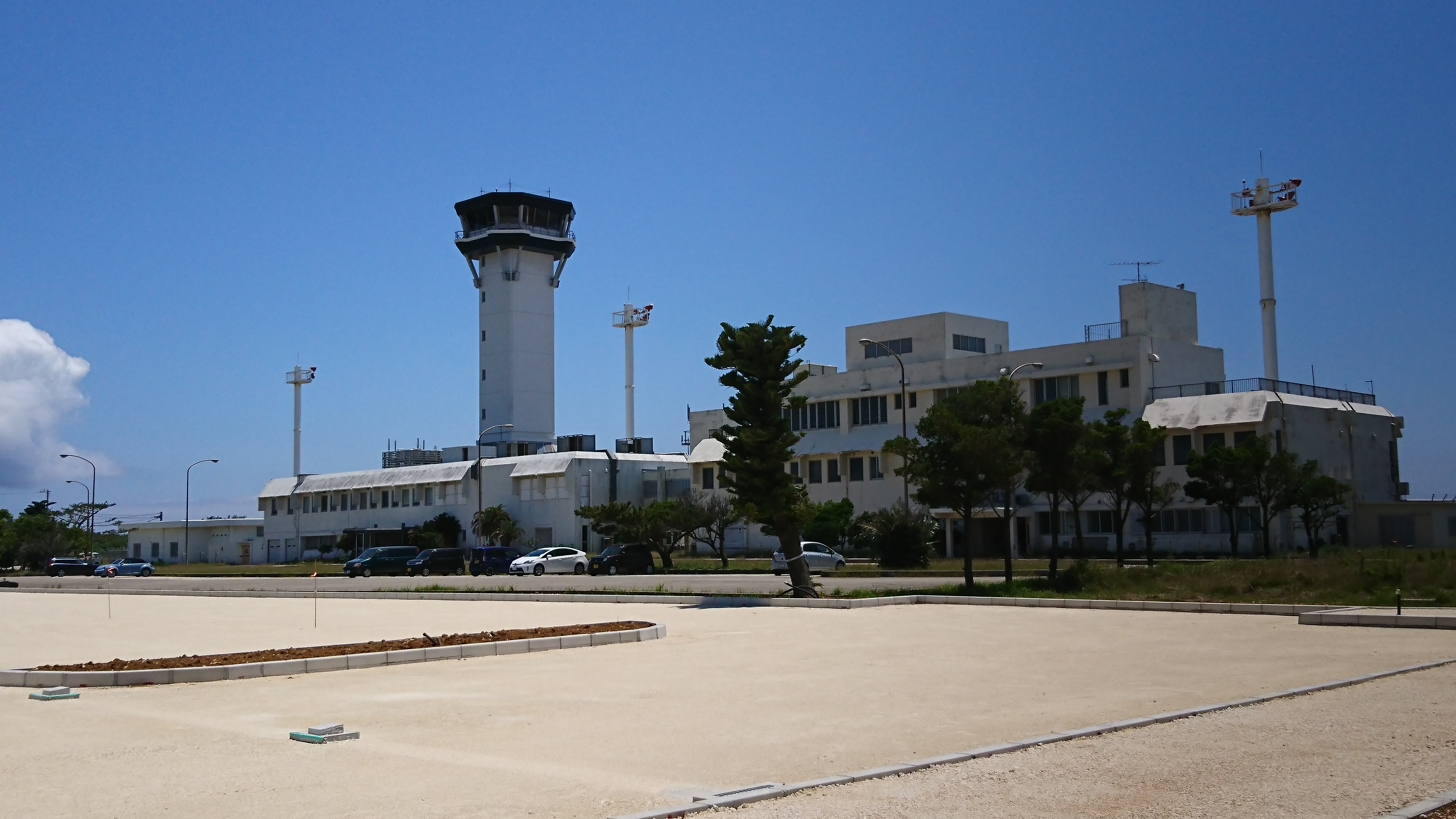
- IATA: SHI; ICAO: RORS

Summary
- Airport type: Public
- Owner/Operator: Okinawa Prefecture
- Serves: Miyakojima, Okinawa
- Location: Shimojishima, Miyakojima, Okinawa, Japan
- Opened: July 1973; 53 years ago
- Elevation AMSL: 25 ft (7.6 m)
- Coordinates: 24°49′36″N 125°08′41″E

Map
- Location in Okinawa Prefecture Location in Japan

Runways
Direction	Length		Surface
Direction	m	ft	Surface
17/35	3,000	9,843	Asphalt
- Source: Japanese AIP at AIS Japan

Shimojishima Airport (下地島空港, Shimojishima Kūkō) (IATA: SHI, ICAO: RORS) is located on the island of Shimojishima in Miyakojima, Okinawa Prefecture, Japan. It has the longest runway of any island in Japan south of the main island of Okinawa. Mitsubishi Estate has built a passenger terminal which began operating commercial flights in March 2019.

While Mitsubishi Estate owns the terminal, it outsources its operation to its subsidiary, Shimojishima Airport Management jointly founded together with Kokuba-Gumi and Sojitz.

The prefecture operates the airport, which has been classified as a Third Class airport (otherwise known as a Type-3) since May 1979.

== History ==
The airport, also known as Shimoji Airport, was originally built as a 'training airport' for commercial pilots, with a secondary role as a (planned) alternative landing site for intercontinental supersonic airliners. It was completed in 1971, a year before Okinawa reverted to Japanese control. It was officially opened in July 1973, initially as a private airport.

Scheduled commercial service to Naha began in 1980. On July 22, 1994 Japan Transocean Air suspended flights.

The airport was in use as a touch-and-go landing training facility for Japan Airlines and All Nippon Airways from 1980. ANA ended touch-and-go training operations at Shimoji in 2014, but returned in November 2026, expecting to conduct four sets of touch-and-go training in the following fiscal year.

The completion of the Irabu Bridge in 2015 spurred interest in travel to the area around Shimoji. The airport opened a new terminal building in 2019, and saw an influx of domestic and international flights. Jetstar Japan became the first scheduled carrier to serve the airport in 24 years, and was later joined by Skymark Airlines. All Nippon Airways operated an Airbus A380 charter flight to Shimoji in 2021, and Japan Airlines operated a Boeing 777 charter to Shimoji in 2022 to commemorate its retirement of the 777-200ER type. A private jet terminal with CIQ facilities opened in 2024.

The airport had scheduled service to Hong Kong prior to the COVID-19 pandemic. Scheduled international service resumed in June 2024 with Jin Air's first arrival from Incheon. Shimoji was designated as a customs airport in July 2026, allowing it to accept international air cargo flights. It was the third airport in Okinawa to receive this designation.

=== Potential defense use ===
A memorandum between Okinawa Gov. Chobyo Yara and the Japanese government, signed in 1969, stated that the airport would only be used for civilian purposes. This position was reiterated by Gov. Junji Nishime in 1979, following the reversion of Okinawa to Japanese control. However, the airport is listed as a CSL (Cooperative Security Location) by the US DOD, and has a 'shadow designation' as Shimoji Air Base as part of its Type-3 status. The airport's strategic location near Taiwan and the Senkaku Islands, as well as its very long runway, make it of interest to defense planners.

After scheduled air service ended in 1994, the local town of Irabu made efforts to bring the Japan Air Self-Defense Force to Shimoji for economic revitalization purposes, and submitted a formal request to that effect in 2001, but withdrew their request amid local opposition in 2005.

From 2001 onwards, the U.S. Marine Corps occasionally used the airport as a stopover point for helicopters and tanker aircraft involved in regional exercises. In 2004, there were some protests over the use of the airport as a refueling stop by USMC helicopters returning from an exercise in the Philippines. Adding to concerns were reports that the airport was being looked at in connection with a new base for units that were to be displaced by the planned relocation of the Futenma base. In 2010, there were renewed protests against proposals to turn Shimoji Airport into a permanent USMC post.

As Sino-Japanese relations began to worsen around 2009, Japanese defense planners came to view the Ryukyu Islands as a hole in Japan's defensive perimeter, leading to the opening of multiple defense bases in the islands in the 2010s and 2020s. As of early 2013, serious consideration was being given to basing a detachment of JASDF F-15J fighters out of the Airport, in order to provide better air defense coverage over the Senkaku Islands. "Scramble" missions to intercept Chinese overflights of the Senkakus have been conducted from Naha Air Base, which is 420 km from the islands, while Shimoji is only 200 km from the islands.

In December 2022, the Japan Air Self-Defense Force considered using Shimoji for refueling the Blue Impulse demonstration team, but opted not to do so due to prefectural opposition. In January 2023, the USMC applied to Okinawa Prefecture to use the airport for approximately one hour for humanitarian and disaster relief purposes; the prefecture rejected this request, with Gov. Denny Tamaki reiterating the position that the airfield should only be used for civilian purposes.

In October 2026, Okinawa Governor Genta Koja stated that he had not decided a position on military use of the airport.

=== Space use ===
PD AeroSpace signed a memorandum with Okinawa Prefecture in 2020 to develop Shimojishima as a spaceport. Operations were expected to begin in 2025, but were derailed by the crash of an unmanned experimental test flight in 2023. The company's stated target was space tourism, especially aimed at wealthy Chinese customers.

== Airlines and destinations ==
Airlines	Destinations
HK Express	Hong Kong
Jetstar Japan	Osaka–Kansai, Tokyo–Narita
Jin Air	Seoul–Incheon
Skymark Airlines	Fukuoka, Kobe, Naha, Tokyo–Haneda
Starlux Airlines	Taichung, Taipei–Taoyuan

== Popular culture ==
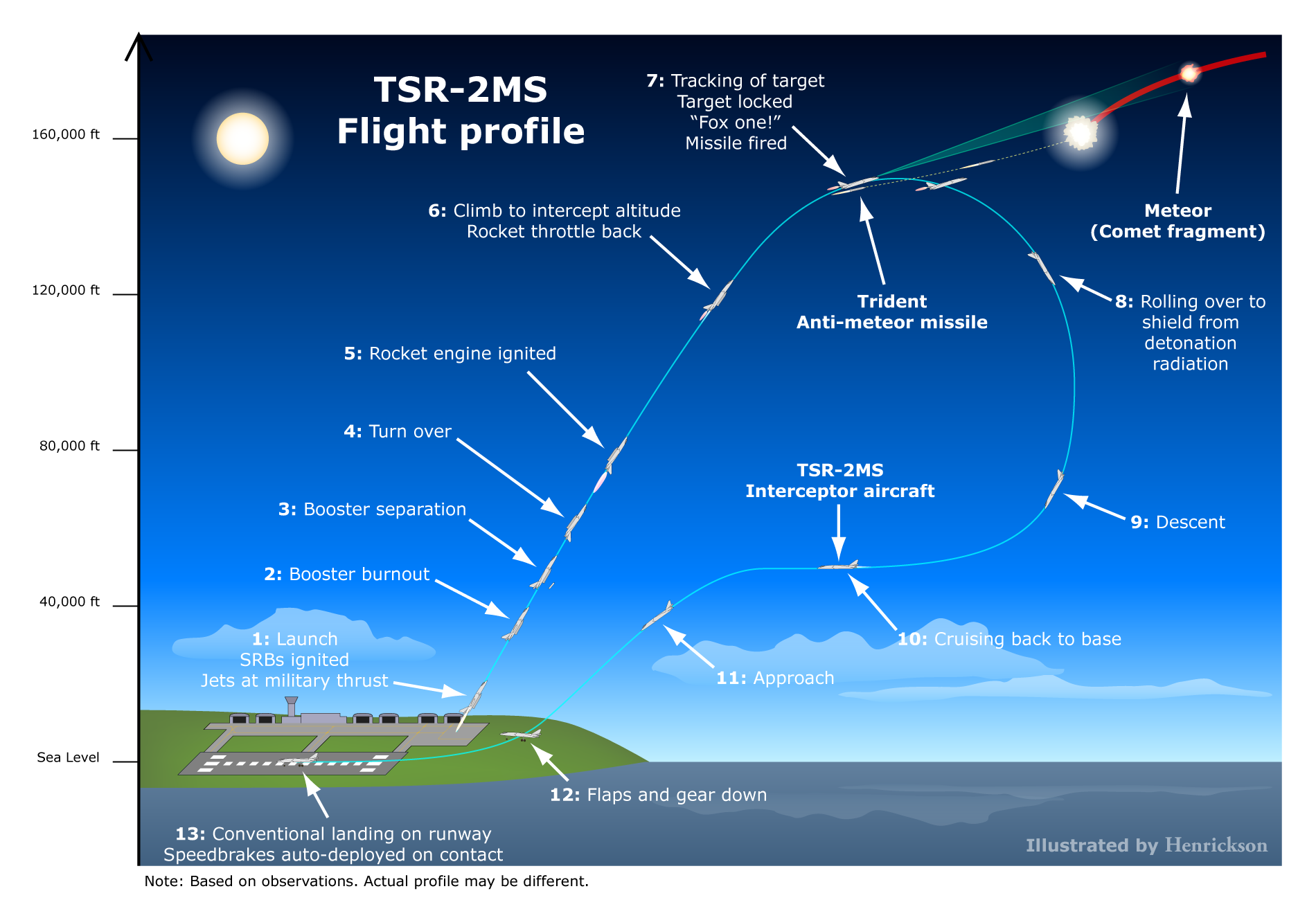

In the anime Stratos 4, set in an alternate timeline, Shimojishima Airport had become Shimoji Airbase sometime after the year 1984. This is home to the Shimoji MS (Meteor Sweeper) Squadron, part of an international planetary defence organisation.

== Accidents and incidents ==
- On April 8, 2023, two United States Air Force F-16 Fighting Falcon jets made an emergency landing at Shimoji.

== See also ==
- Miyako Airport
