= Skymark Airlines =

Airline of Japan

Skymark Airlines Inc. スカイマーク株式会社 Sukaimāku Kabushiki-gaisha

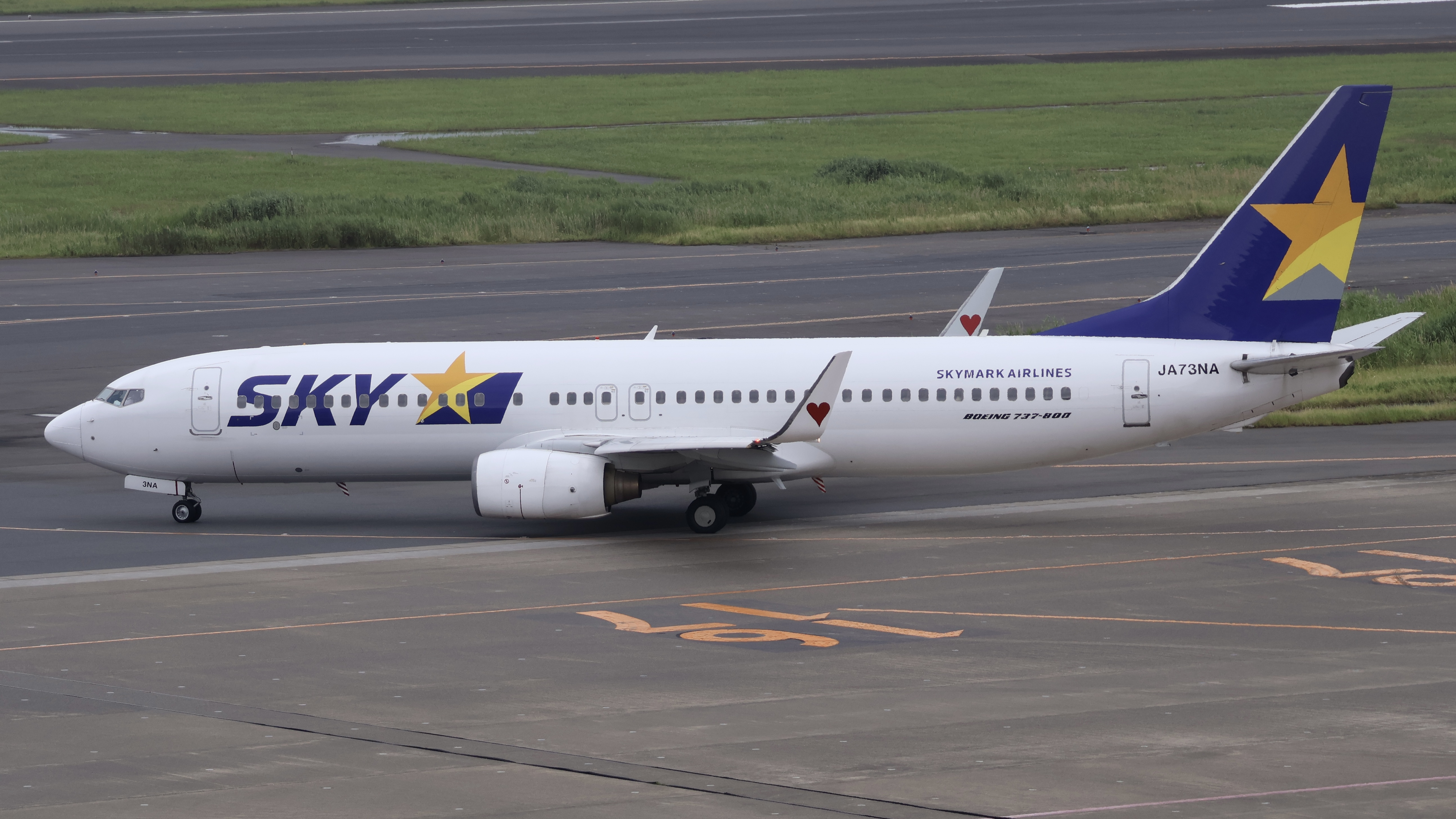
IATA	ICAO	Call sign
BC	SKY	SKYMARK
- Founded: November 12, 1996; 29 years ago
- Commenced operations: September 19, 1998; 28 years ago
- Operating bases: Fukuoka; Kobe; Kagoshima; Naha; Sapporo–Chitose; Tokyo–Haneda
- Fleet size: 31
- Destinations: 11
- Traded as: TYO: 9204
- ISIN: JP3396000006
- Headquarters: Haneda Airport, Ōta, Tokyo, Japan
- Key people: Hayao Hora (president, representative director & executive officer) Reijiro Yamamoto (chairman & director)
- Revenue: ▲¥47.1 billion (FY March 2022)
- Operating income: ▲ (¥16.7 billion) (FY March 2022)
- Net income: ▲ (¥6.7 billion) (FY March 2022)
- Total assets: ▲¥93.6 billion (March 2022)
- Total equity: ▼¥9.2 billion (Dec. 2014)
- Employees: 2,457 (31 March 2024)
- Website: www.skymark.co.jp

Skymark Airlines is a Japanese airline headquartered at Haneda Airport in Ōta, Tokyo, Japan. It operates scheduled services with a main base at Haneda Airport with another base at Kobe Airport where it is the dominant carrier. It also operates a base at Naha Airport. It is the only Japanese airline offering regular scheduled services at Ibaraki Airport north of Tokyo.

Skymark was the first low-cost airline established in Japan. Internet entrepreneur Shinichi Nishikubo controlled the company from 2003 to 2015, when the carrier filed for bankruptcy protection after attempting a fleet and service expansion.

In August 2015, Skymark creditors agreed to restructure the airline under the control of Japanese private equity fund Integral Corporation (50.1%), with minority investments from All Nippon Airways (16.5%), Sumitomo Mitsui Banking Corporation and the Development Bank of Japan (33.4%).

== History ==
=== Low-cost airline operations (1996–2010) ===
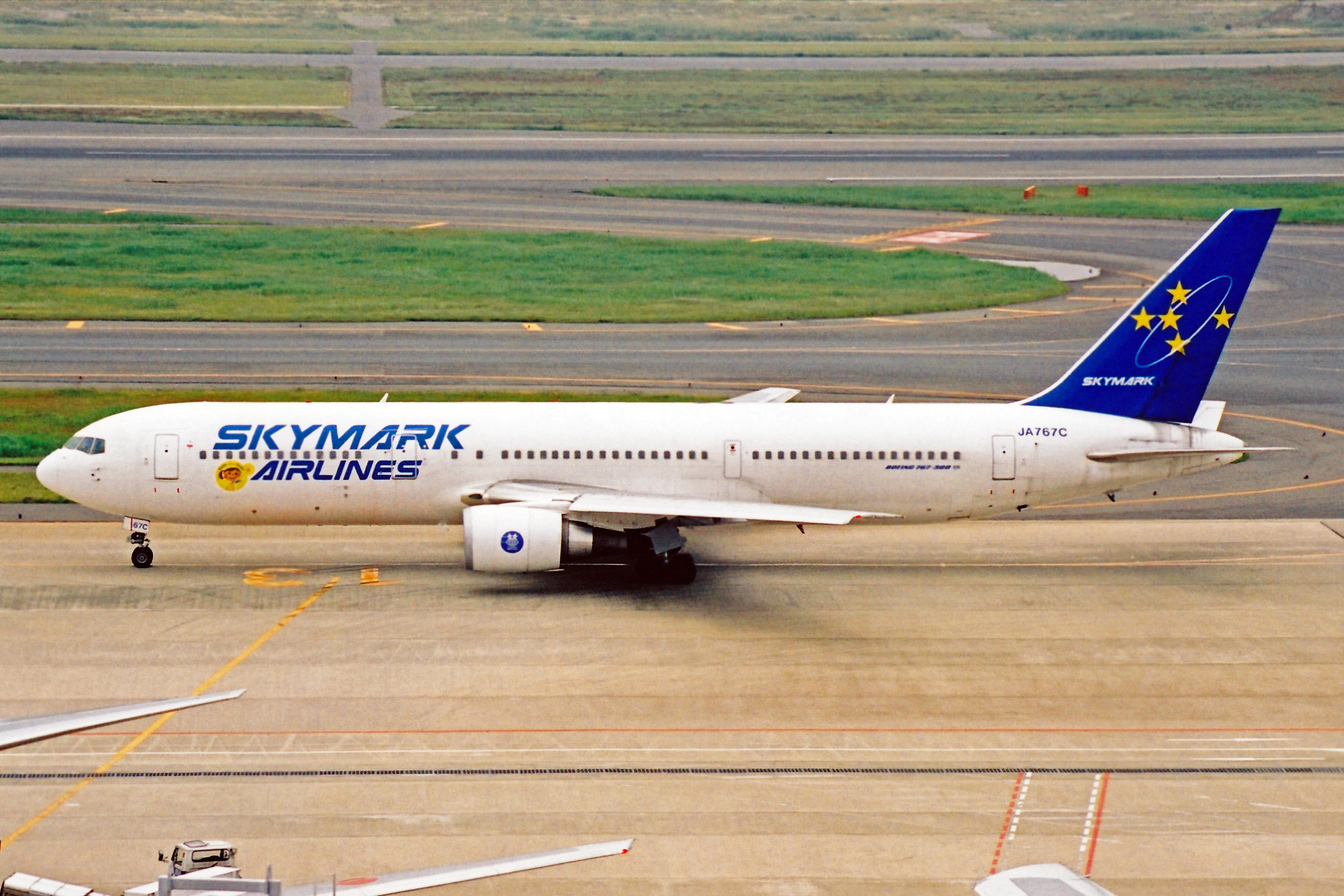
A Skymark Boeing 767-300ER in the airline's first livery at Haneda Airport in 2003

Skymark Airlines was founded in November 1996 as an independent domestic airline after deregulation of the Japanese airline industry and started operations on 19 September 1998. It was originally owned by a consortium of investors led by the travel agency H.I.S. and headed by H.I.S. president Hideo Sawada; another major early investor was the leasing company Orix. Its initial business plan called for it to be headquartered at Itami Airport in Osaka. Takashi Ide, former head of British Airways' operation in Japan, was hired as the company's CEO in 1998.

Skymark was able to obtain six slots at Haneda Airport in Tokyo in March 1997 and moved its headquarters to the Hamamatsucho district of Tokyo in March 1998. Its first scheduled flight from Haneda to Fukuoka was on 19 September 1998; it added routes from Itami to Fukuoka and Sapporo in 1999, but suspended these routes in 2000 in order to offer more frequencies on the Haneda-Fukuoka route.

In 2002, Skymark took delivery of a third Boeing 767 aircraft and began service on the Haneda-Kagoshima route, as well as charter service from Haneda to Seoul. In 2003, with a fourth 767 dry-leased (leased without any crew members) from All Nippon Airways, it began service to Aomori and Tokushima.

The airline incurred considerable losses in its first few years of operations. It briefly considered a recapitalization led by Commerzbank but decided not to accept such an investment due to Air Do's issues with banks interfering in management. In August 2003, Sawada invited internet entrepreneur Shinichi Nishikubo to become Skymark's largest shareholder with a personal cash investment of 3.5 billion yen (having made around 9 billion yen from the IPO of his internet company in 2000). Nishikubo took over as CEO in 2004, maintaining Ide as a "co-pilot" due to Ide's experience in the aviation industry.

On 11 December 2003, Skymark announced that it expected a profit of 470 million yen for the half-fiscal year ending on 31 October, the first profit made since the airline began operations. By using more efficient aircraft and systems developed in-house, Skymark attempted to undercut JAL and ANA on costs in order to offer lower fares.

Skymark had a code sharing partnership with Japan Airlines starting with a Haneda-Osaka Kansai service in 2005–06, and later on the Tokyo Haneda-Kobe route from Kobe Airport's opening in 2006. JAL withdrew from Kobe in 2010, while Skymark developed Kobe into a secondary base. Skymark purchased the naming rights for the Kobe Sports Park Baseball Stadium from 2005 to 2010.

Skymark announced in April 2010 that it would commence a "Narita Shuttle" service from Narita International Airport to Asahikawa, Sapporo, Fukuoka, and Okinawa in late 2011 and early 2012.

=== Shift to premium service (2010–2014) ===
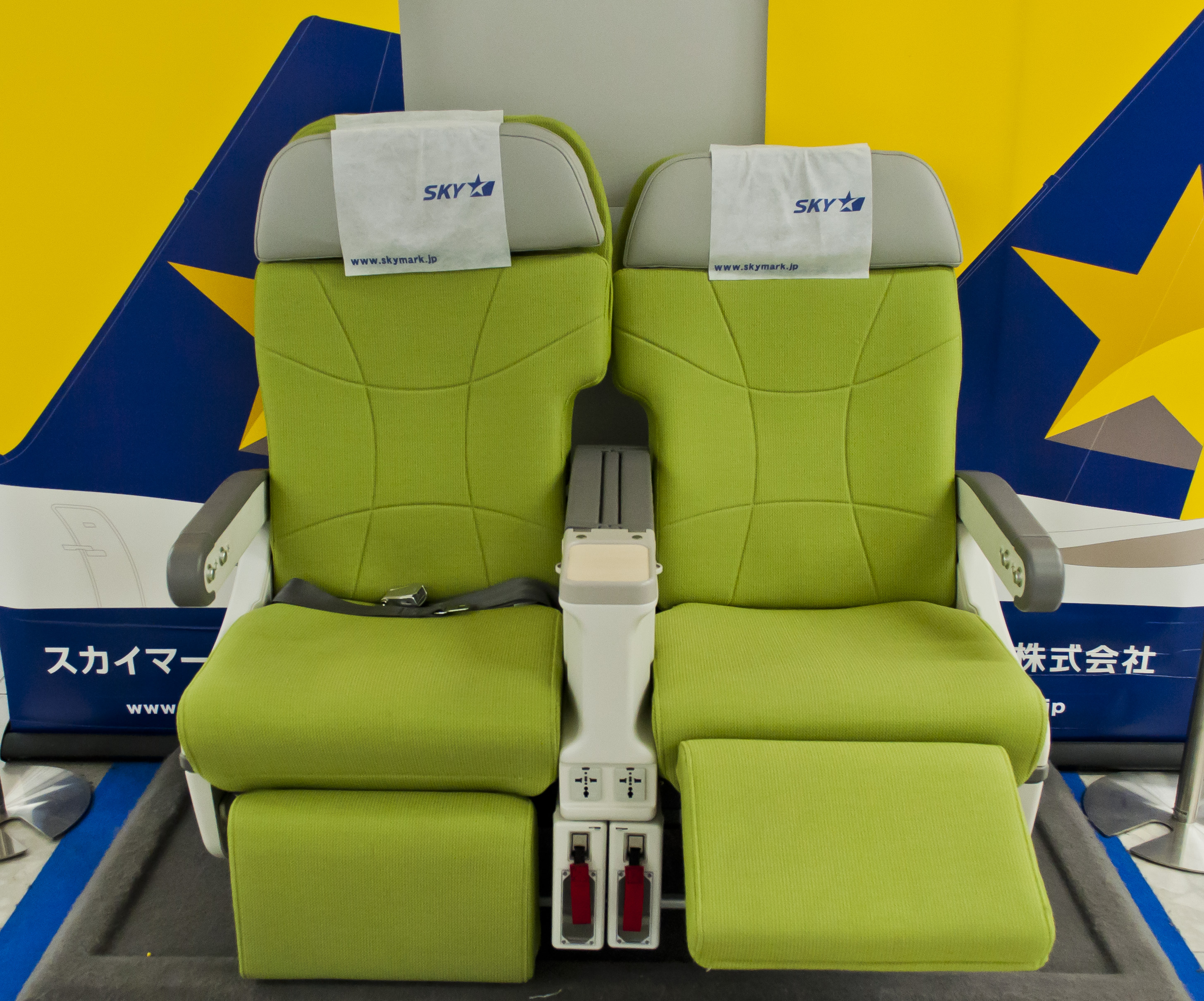
Skymark's premium seating, branded as "Green seats", which were to be used on the airline's Airbus A330s and Boeing 737s

In November 2010 Skymark announced negotiations with Airbus for an order of four Airbus A380 aircraft and two options, making it the first Japanese airline to order the type. The airline announced its intent to use the aircraft on long-haul trunk routes out of Narita Airport such as London, Frankfurt, Paris and New York, and that they would be operated in a two-class, 394-seat configuration – with 114 seats in business class and 280 in a premium economy class. Nishikubo envisioned an unheard-of fully-flat product in economy class, which the Skymark team calculated would break even at a one-way fare of 100,000 yen.

As Skymark began to prepare for international service, it began to face stiff competition from a new group of low-cost carriers in Japan beginning in 2012, particularly from AirAsia Japan (later Vanilla Air), Peach Aviation, Jetstar Japan and Spring Airlines Japan at its Narita base. This led to a reduction in Skymark's frequencies on highly contested routes such as Narita-Sapporo and Narita-Fukuoka, and a refocusing of aircraft on more exclusive routes such as Narita-Ishigaki.

Skymark attempted a more competitive domestic offering by executing leases for seven Airbus A330-300 aircraft in July 2012. Skymark announced that it would outfit these aircraft in a 271-seat single-class premium configuration with 38-inch seat pitch and 22-inch seat width, tentatively called "Green Seats" and comparable to the domestic "Class J" offering on Japan Airlines, to win market share among business travelers on the key domestic trunk routes from Tokyo to Fukuoka and Sapporo. Skymark also had plans to install "Green Seat" cabins on its 737 fleet to create a 2-class configuration but cancelled the plan in early 2014 in favor of keeping a single-class 737 fleet for competition with other LCCs.

Somewhat controversially, Skymark announced that A330 flight attendants would wear miniskirt uniforms, in contrast to Skymark's usual polo shirt uniforms, for the first six months of operation of each route. The Japan Federation of Cabin Attendants publicly complained about the idea, claiming that the uniforms were unsafe to the women wearing them and would lead to harassment and objectification.

Starting in 2013, Delta Air Lines was highly interested in starting a codeshare agreement with Skymark, mainly due to Delta's expansion of its own Tokyo services. Following ANA's investment in Skymark however, the possibility of a codeshare agreement and further partnership with Delta was reduced.

=== Financial downturn and losses (2014–2015) ===
Skymark's finances were hit hard by foreign exchange rate fluctuations. In February 2011, when Skymark placed its initial A380 order, the Japanese yen was trading at historically high levels of around 82 yen to the U.S. dollar. After the introduction of the Abenomics policy in late 2012, the yen plunged in value, reaching around 102 yen to the dollar in early 2015. Many of Skymark's major investments and expenses were denominated in dollars—including the A380 orders, the A330 leases and its fuel costs—while its domestic ticket revenue was in yen, and the airline did not engage in exchange rate hedging. Skymark recorded its first net loss in five years for the March 2013 – 2014 fiscal year.

In early February 2014, Skymark announced that it would downsize the Narita operation to only three destinations (Sapporo, Yonago and Okinawa). Nishikubo stated that the base lost money in every month except August and that all LCCs were under pressure there. He also expressed some reservations about the A330 fleet plan, stating that while the airline had funding in place for the first two aircraft, the third and subsequent deliveries could be impacted by the performance of Skymark's domestic operation as well as the success of its initial international service. Skymark planned to re-deploy 737s from the Narita and Haneda bases for charter services to destinations such as Guam.

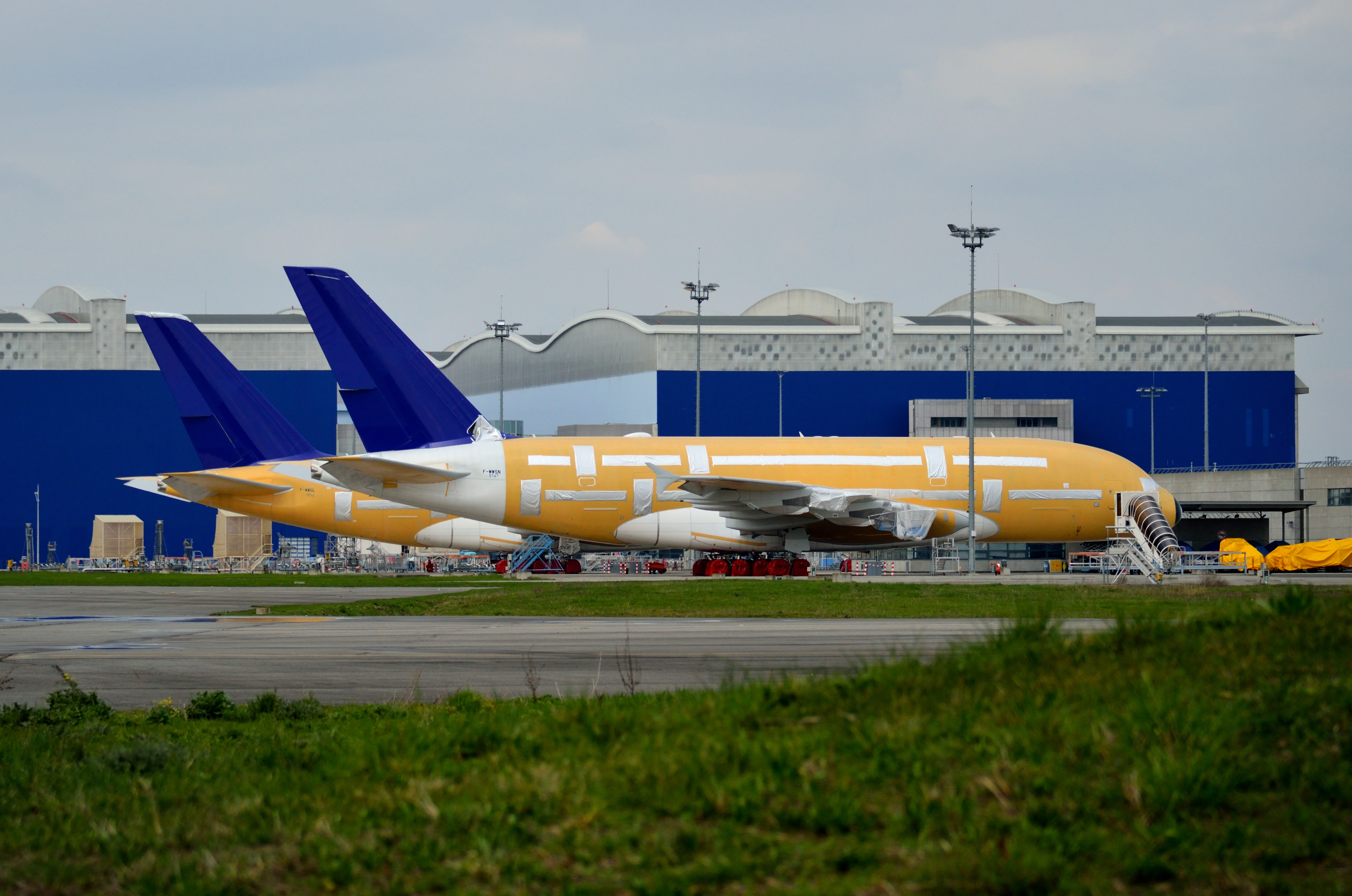
Two of the six Airbus A380s Skymark had on order in long-term storage at Toulouse Blagnac International Airport

Airbus completed Skymark's first A380 in April 2014 and sent the aircraft to Germany for cabin installation. In May, Skymark requested to reschedule a meeting with a European bank involved in financing of its A380 order. Airbus interpreted this as a signal that Skymark sought to renegotiate the contract, and sent a team of financial advisors to Skymark's head office in June. After a week of meetings, they proposed an amendment of the A380 purchase agreement, with the condition that if Skymark did not meet a certain revenue target, Nishikubo would be required to sell his shares to an outside investor chosen by Airbus. Nishikubo rejected this proposal in early July, believing there was a significant chance that Skymark would miss the target.

In late July, Airbus announced that it had terminated the airline's A380 orders, citing concerns over the airline's ability to fund the purchase in light of its poor financial performance. Nishikubo complained the airline was not given the opportunity to revise the contract, but simply received a fax notifying it of the termination. After further negotiations, Airbus sued Skymark for damages in a London court; it was reported that Skymark had already paid Airbus 26.5 billion yen for the aircraft and could face up to 70 billion yen in penalties.

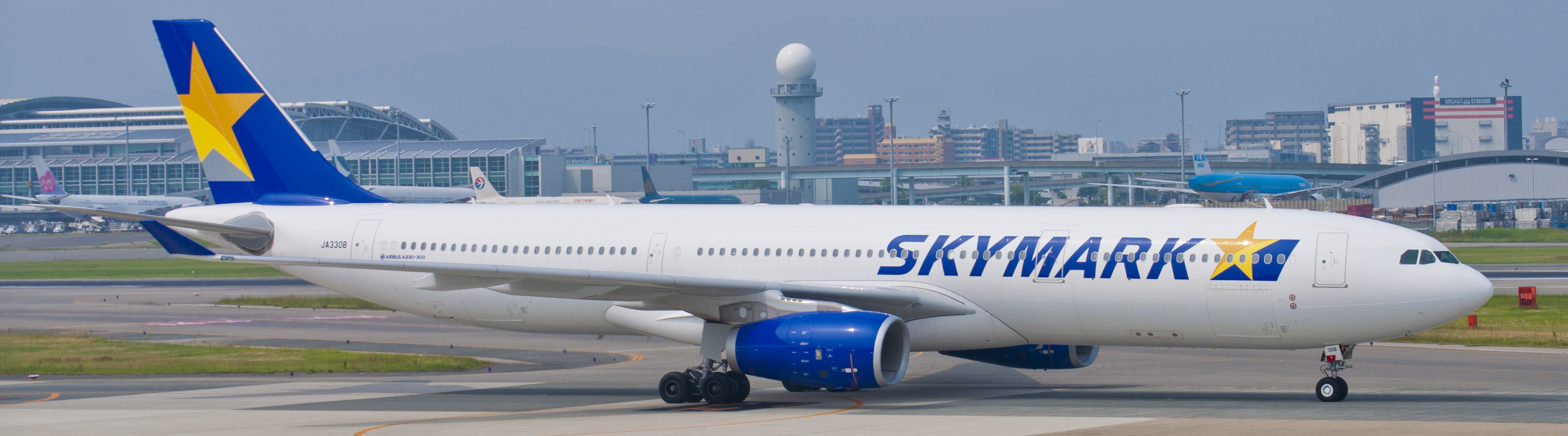
A Skymark Airbus A330-300 at Fukuoka Airport in 2014

Skymark's A330s entered service on the Haneda-Fukuoka route in June 2014, but the additional seat capacity depressed Skymark's load factors on the route. Although Skymark's 737s were booked to more than 80% of capacity up to May 2014, the much larger A330s were only booked at 67% of capacity as of December 2014, while ANA or JAL achieved similar load factors with much higher-capacity aircraft. In an attempt to raise revenue, Skymark raised advance purchase fares on the route by 23% in October, bringing them closer to the level of JAL and ANA and further harming the competitiveness of the service.

As the Airbus dispute lingered, Skymark pursued new sources of cash. It announced in November 2014 that it was exploring a cooperative relationship with Japan Airlines under which Skymark's 36 daily round trips to and from Haneda Airport would be code shared with JAL, subject to approval by the Ministry of Land, Infrastructure and Transport. Skymark initially pursued JAL due to a perception that JAL could not threaten Skymark's independence; the terms of JAL's bankruptcy restructuring prevented it from making an investment in Skymark. However, the Japanese government pressed Skymark to make the codeshare trilateral with both JAL and ANA, reflecting the ruling Liberal Democratic Party's preference for ANA. Skymark also attempted a sale and leaseback of over 1 billion yen in equipment as a cash-raising measure, negotiating with a JAL-affiliated trading company and then with an ANA-affiliated trading company. In January 2015, ANA refused to provide financial support to Skymark, and several investment funds also balked at the prospect of injecting cash into the company.

=== Bankruptcy (2015–2016) ===
Skymark filed for bankruptcy protection under the Corporate Rehabilitation Law (equivalent to a Chapter 11 bankruptcy in the United States or an administration in the United Kingdom) at the Tokyo District Court in January 2015 after reporting ¥71 billion (or $571.3 million) in liabilities. It announced that Nishikubo would step down as CEO and would be replaced by CFO Masakazu Arimori. Skymark announced that the A330s would be withdrawn from operation in March, and that various services to Okinawa and Kyushu would be eliminated. In an attempt to regain price competitiveness, Skymark introduced a fare of ¥8,000 on the Haneda-Fukuoka route, 1,800 cheaper than the next cheapest competitor, StarFlyer. Skymark was approached by several potential sponsors early in its bankruptcy proceedings, including ANA, AirAsia, Delta Air Lines and American Airlines.

Skymark's restructuring plan, submitted to the court in May, called for turnaround sponsor Japanese private equity fund Integral to own 50.1% of the recapitalized company, ANA to own 16.5%, and the remainder 33.4% to be owned by an investment fund controlled by government-affiliated Development Bank of Japan and Sumitomo Mitsui Banking Corporation, with Integral providing the new chairman, DBJ providing the new CEO, and code sharing between Skymark and ANA.

Intrepid Aviation and Airbus, who together held around two-thirds of Skymark's debt, opposed the plan, and Intrepid submitted a competing plan which called for another (unspecified) airline to sponsor Skymark's restructuring. Intrepid reportedly approached several foreign airlines seeking support for this alternative plan.

In the final creditor vote on 6 August 2015, the plan supported by ANA and Integral defeated a competing plan supported by Intrepid and Delta. The Delta plan was initially assumed to be the front runner based on Airbus's closer relationship with Delta, but Airbus ultimately switched sides and supported the ANA plan. The Nihon Keizai Shimbun reported that ANA made a conditional offer in late July to purchase Airbus aircraft, which Delta did not match by a prescribed midnight deadline, leading Airbus to switch its stance on the restructuring. ANA announced an order for three A380 aircraft in late 2015, which even ANA admitted was not consistent with its overall fleet plan, leading to speculation that ANA had agreed to accept Skymark's A380 orders in exchange for Airbus's support.

=== Post-bankruptcy (2016–2020) ===
After exiting bankruptcy in 2016, Skymark's finances improved more quickly than expected; the company recorded 6.7 billion yen in operating profit in the March 2016 – 2017 fiscal year. Skymark focused its network expansion on its hubs in Kobe and Ibaraki, and announced plans for 150 daily flights in summer 2018, up from 138 in summer 2017.

Skymark announced in June 2018 that it intended to offer international charter flights from Narita to Saipan and Palau, its first international services, with the flights to Saipan subsequently becoming scheduled flights in late 2019.

=== COVID-19 pandemic, second financial losses, recovery (2020–present) ===
Since 2020, due to the COVID-19 pandemic, the Saipan route was cancelled and was never restored; in late 2022, the CEO of Skymark publicly stated that the airline has no plans to resume scheduled international service before 2026.

In August 2020, the airline announced Shimojishima Airport as a new destination, with flights beginning in October 2020.

In 2021, the first year after effect of COVID-19, Skymarks records ¥27 billion operating losses, become the company's worst losses since it exiting from bankruptcy. The airline reported ¥17 billion operating losses once again in 2022.

Skymark was re-listed on the Tokyo Stock Exchange in December 2022, after eight years as a privately held company.

In January 2023, Skymark announced firm orders for four Boeing 737 MAX aircraft (two 737 MAX 8 and two 737 MAX 10), as well as options to purchase one of each, and a plan to lease six more MAX 8s. The new aircraft are scheduled to enter service between 2025 and 2027.

== Destinations ==
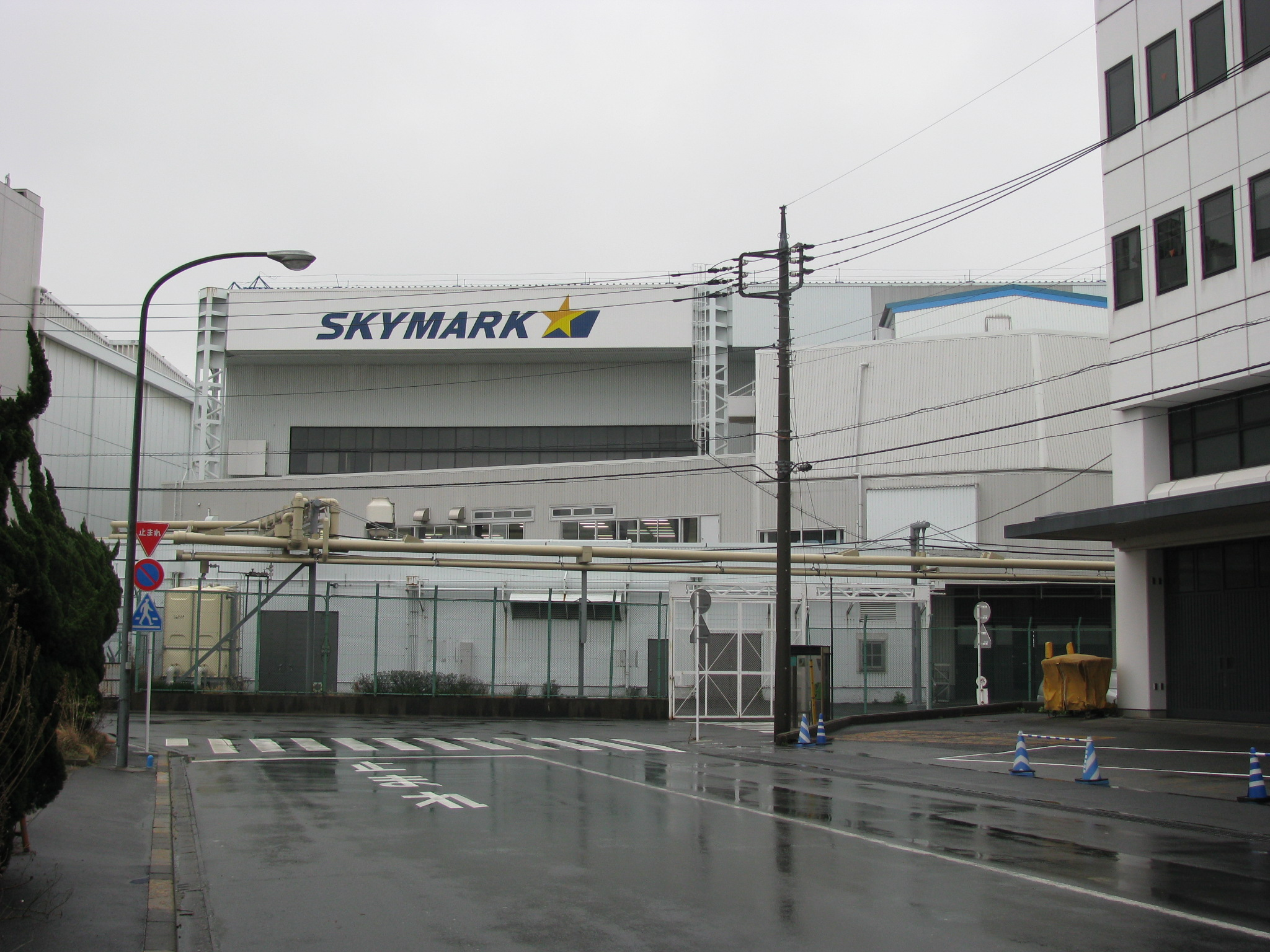
Skymark headquarters at Haneda Airport

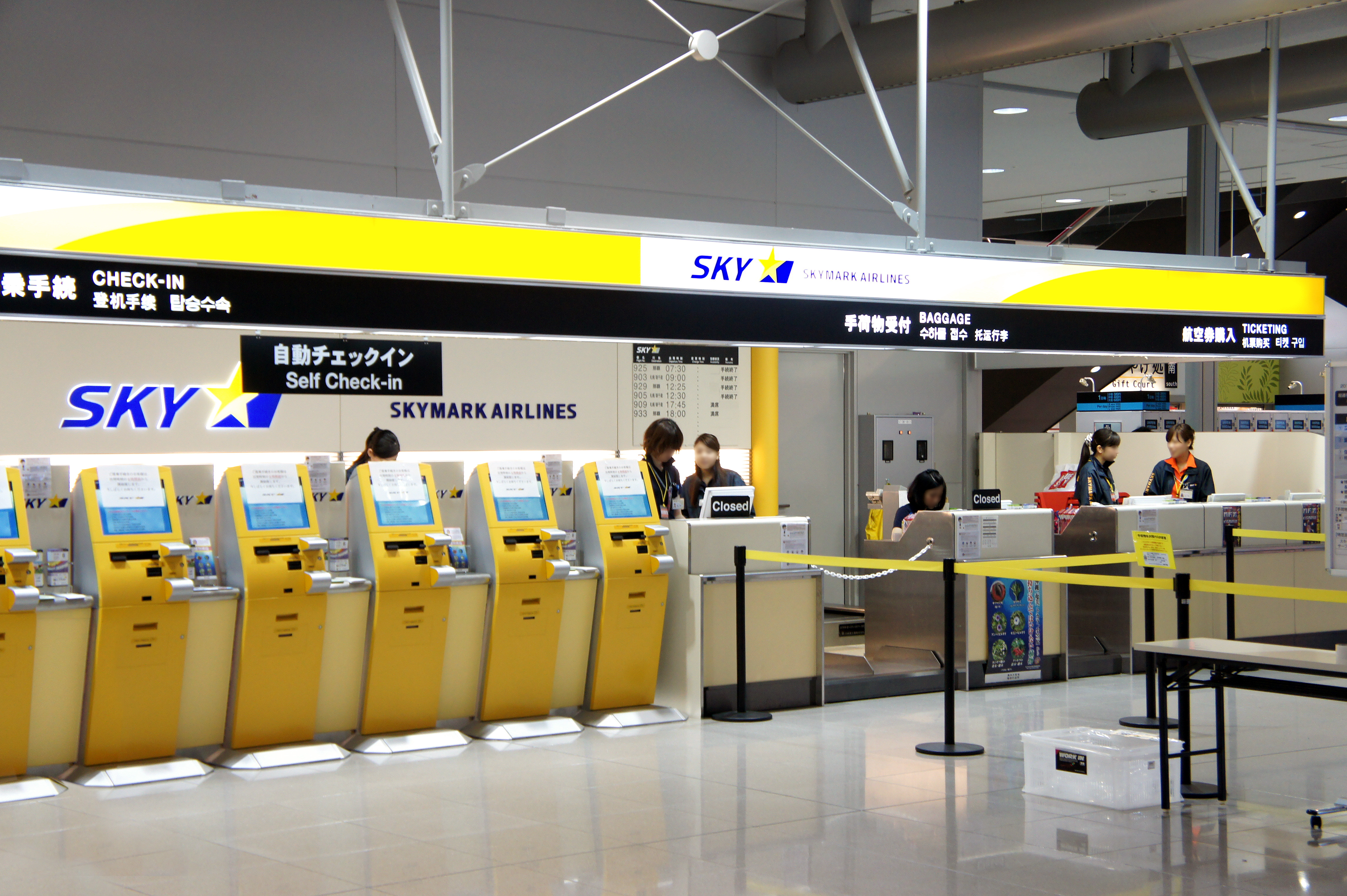
Check-in counters at Kansai International Airport

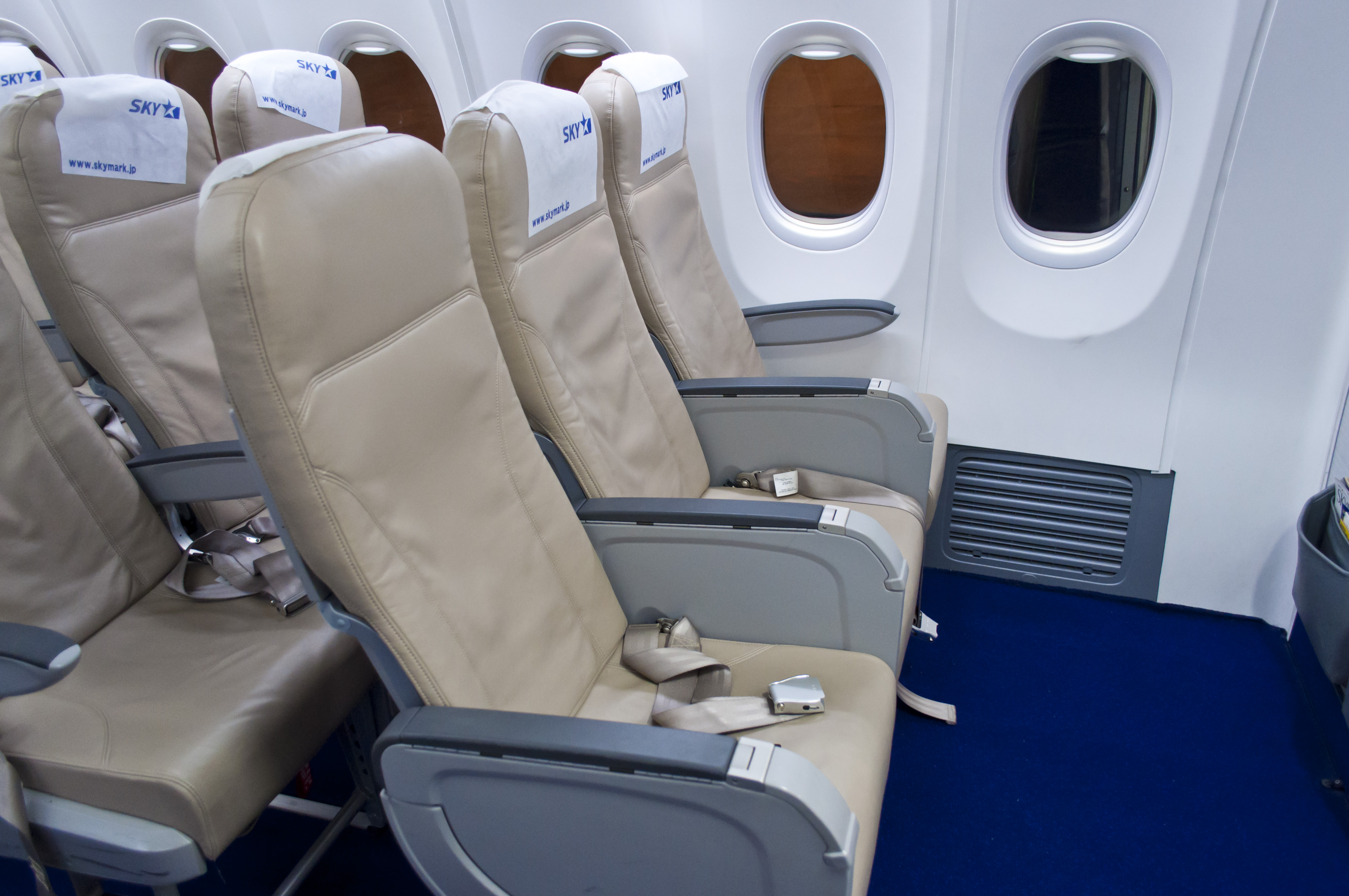
Boeing 737-800 seating

As of July 2024, Skymark Airlines flies (or has flown) to the following destinations:

Country (Region)	City	Airport	Notes	Ref
Japan (Hokkaido)	Asahikawa	Asahikawa Airport	Terminated	
Japan (Hokkaido)	Sapporo	New Chitose Airport	Base	
Japan (Honshu)	Aomori	Aomori Airport	Terminated	
Japan (Honshu)	Ibaraki	Ibaraki Airport		
Japan (Honshu)	Kobe	Kobe Airport	Base	
Japan (Honshu)	Nagoya	Chubu Centrair International Airport		
Japan (Honshu)	Osaka	Itami Airport	Terminated	
Japan (Honshu)	Osaka	Kansai International Airport	Terminated	
Japan (Honshu)	Sendai	Sendai Airport		
Japan (Honshu)	Tokyo	Haneda Airport	Base	
Japan (Honshu)	Tokyo	Narita International Airport	Terminated	
Japan (Honshu)	Yonago	Miho-Yonago Airport	Terminated	
Japan (Kyushu)	Fukuoka	Fukuoka Airport	Base	
Japan (Kyushu)	Kagoshima	Kagoshima Airport	Base	
Japan (Kyushu)	Kitakyushu	Kitakyushu Airport	Terminated	
Japan (Kyushu)	Kumamoto	Kumamoto Airport	Terminated	
Japan (Kyushu)	Nagasaki	Nagasaki Airport		
Japan (Ryukyu Islands)	Amami	Amami Airport		
Japan (Ryukyu Islands)	Ishigaki	New Ishigaki Airport	Terminated	
Japan (Ryukyu Islands)	Miyakojima	Miyako Airport	Terminated	
Japan (Ryukyu Islands)	Naha	Naha Airport	Base	
Japan (Ryukyu Islands)	Miyakojima	Shimojishima Airport		
Japan (Shikoku)	Tokushima	Tokushima Airport	Terminated	
United States (Northern Mariana Islands)	Saipan	Saipan International Airport	Terminated	

=== Table of main routes ===
Flights between the two airports are shown by the symbol ○

×	×	×	○	○	○	○	○	Chitose
×	○	×	○	○	×	×	Ibaraki	
○	○	○	○	○	×	Haneda		
×	○	○	×	×	Chubu			
○	○	○	×	Kobe				
×	○	×	Fukuoka					
×	×	Kagoshima						
○	Naha							
Shimoji

=== Codeshare agreements ===
Skymark has previously sought or established codeshare agreements with airlines including All Nippon Airways, Delta Air Lines, and Japan Airlines, but since 2018 has insisted on operating independently of these partnerships.

== Fleet ==
=== Current fleet ===
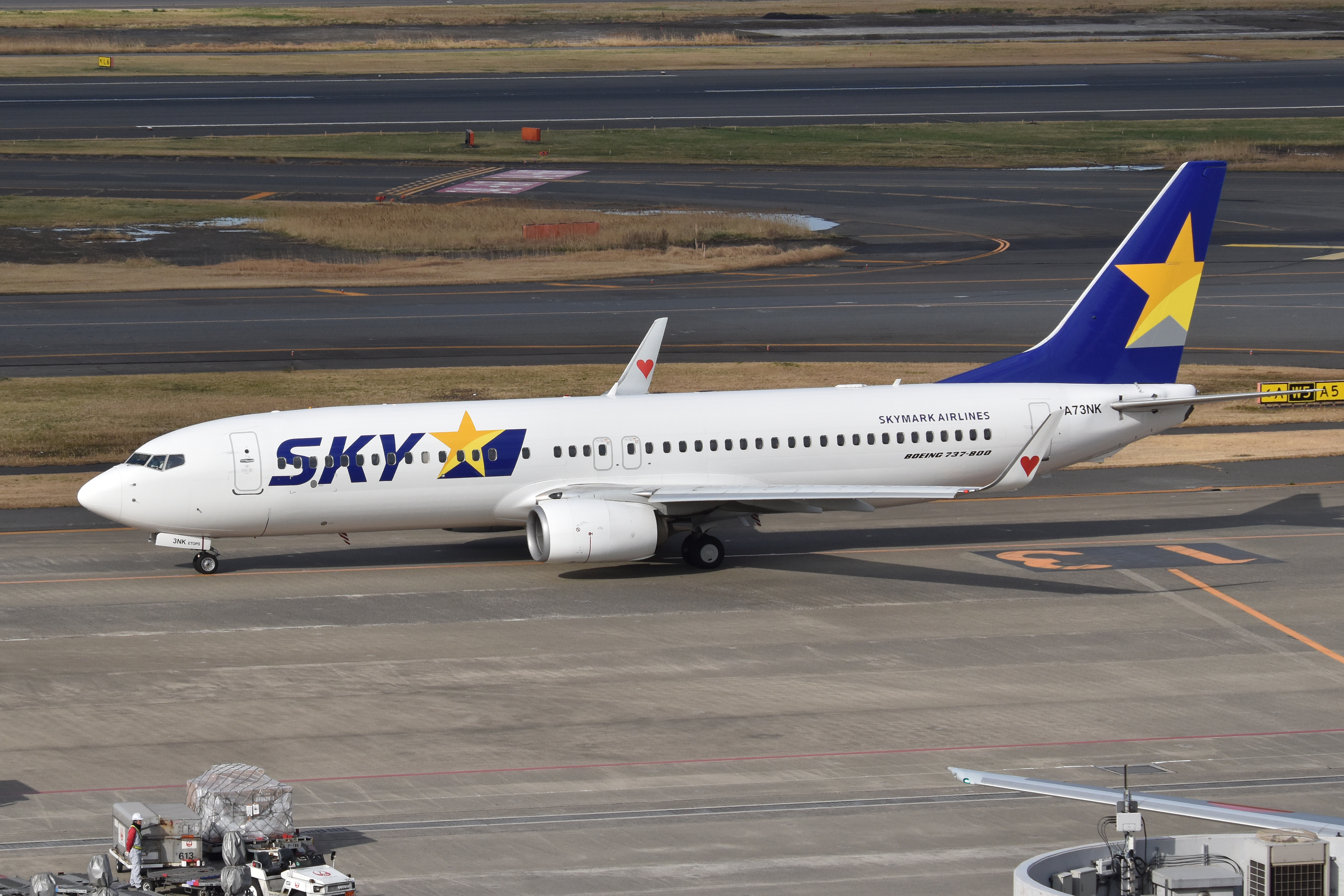
A Skymark Boeing 737-800

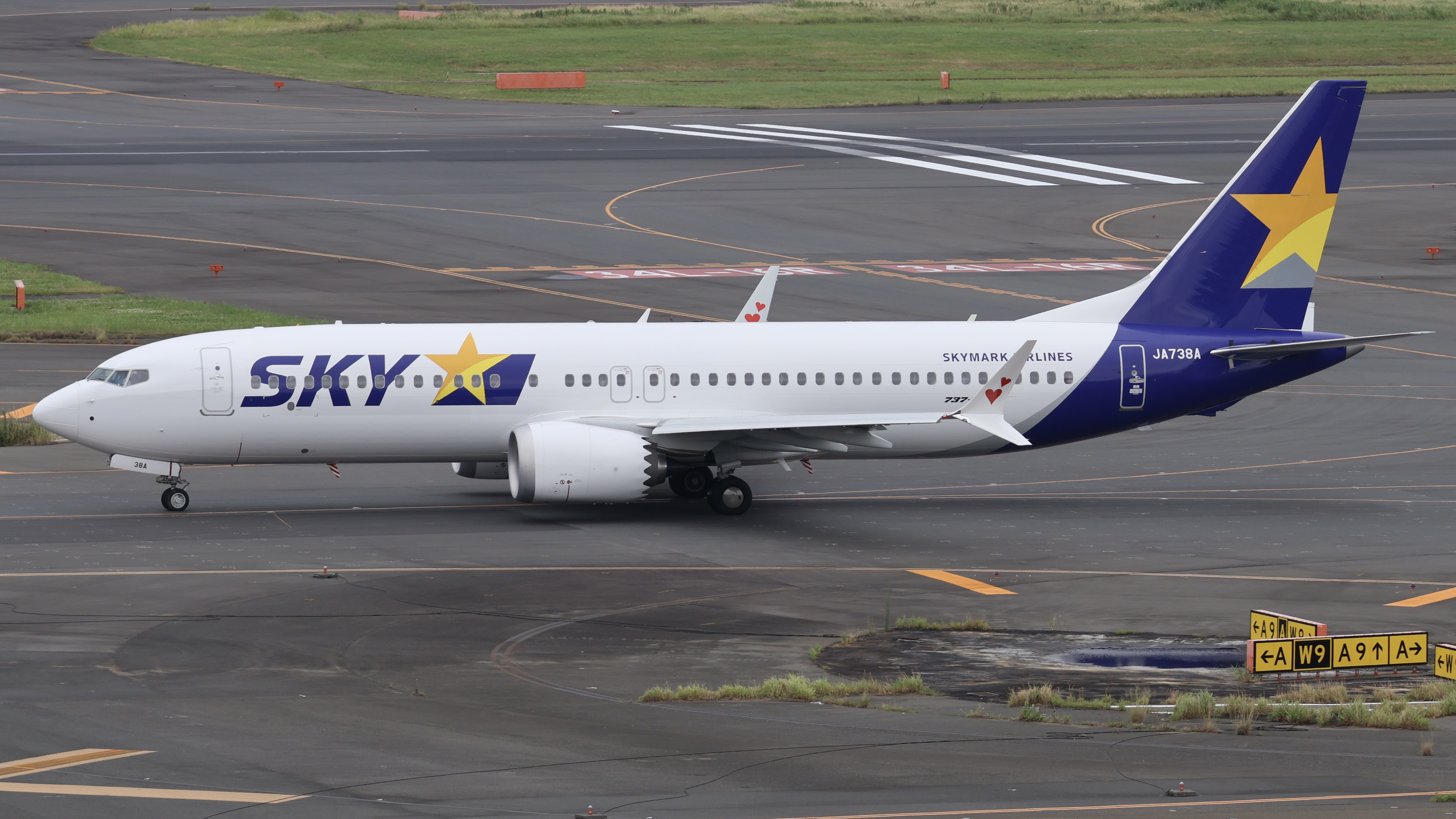
A Skymark Boeing 737 MAX 8

As of July 2026, Skymark Airlines operates the following aircraft:

Aircraft	In service	Orders	Passengers	Notes
Boeing 737-800	29	—	177	
Boeing 737 MAX 8	2	11	177	Deliveries in 2026.
Boeing 737 MAX 10	—	14	207	Deliveries begin 2027.
Total	31	25		

=== Fleet development ===
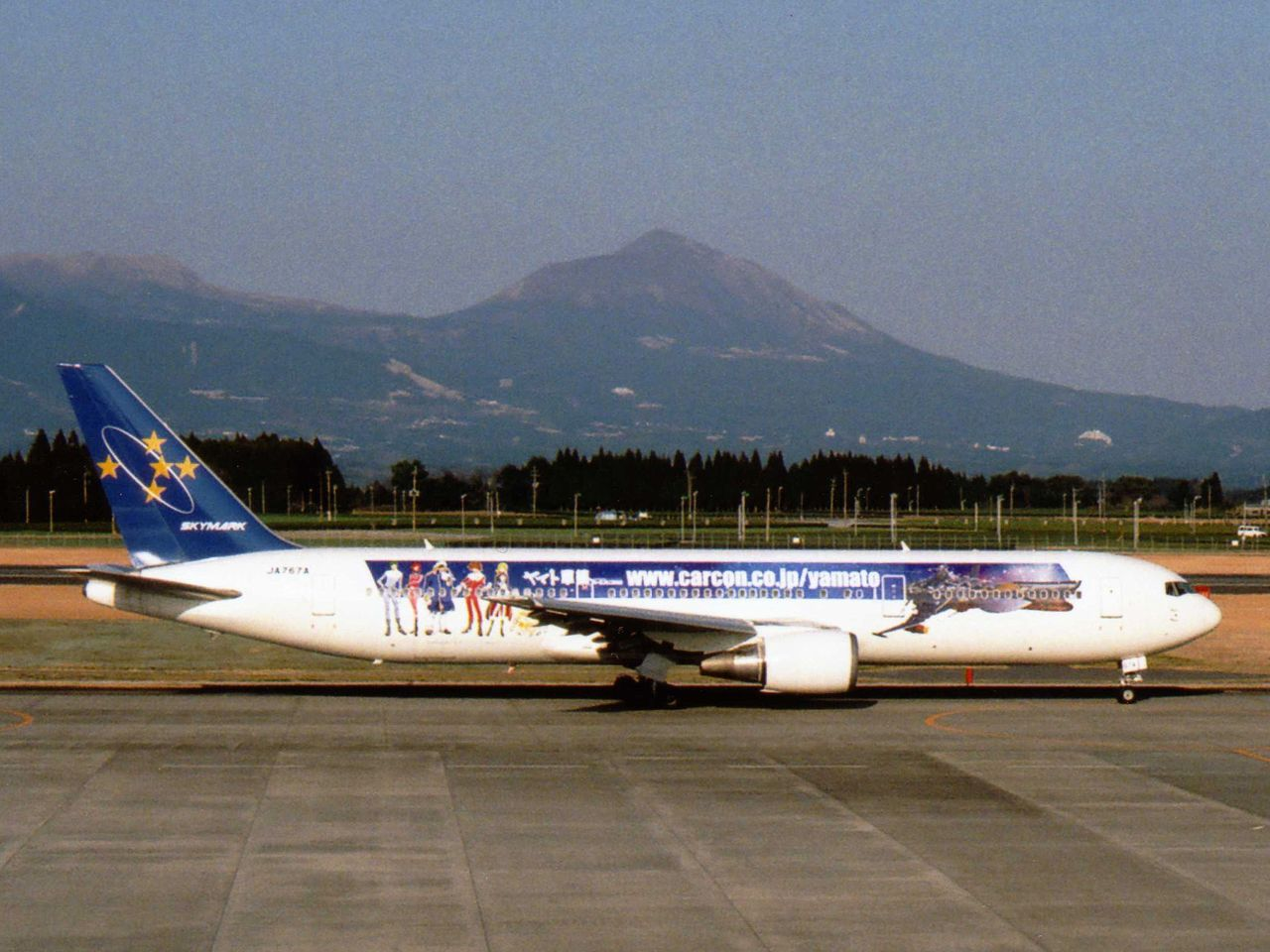
A former Skymark Boeing 767-300ER in "Yamato" promotional livery

Previously, Skymark operated seven Boeing 767-200 and Boeing 767-300 widebody aircraft between 1998 and 2005. Some 767 fuselages were painted in special "billboard" liveries advertising third-party companies, including Yahoo Japan, Microsoft, J-Phone and USEN Japan. The six 767s acquired by Skymark carried registrations JA767A to JA767F; the seventh, JA8255, was leased from All Nippon Airways from 2003 to 2004.

Under Nishikubo, Skymark began acquiring new Boeing 737-800 narrowbody aircraft in 2005 and eventually retired the 767 from its fleet in 2009.

Skymark ceased flying the A330 and most of the 737s during its bankruptcy in 2015. All A380 orders from Skymark were rescinded as well, although All Nippon Airways proceeded to take three of the five original orders. The two remaining Skymark A380s that were placed into long-term storage following their production were taken up by Emirates.

== Frequent flyer program ==
Skymark planned to introduce a frequent-flyer program in January 2014 to coincide with the launch of its premium domestic service, though the induction of the program was delayed in December 2013 in order to focus on preparing for international service, before being postponed indefinitely. While the airline does not retain its own frequent-flyer program, Skymark has provided award seats to members of the Delta Air Lines SkyMiles program since June 2011, although the two airlines do not codeshare, nor can Skymark flights be used to accrue under Delta's SkyMiles program.
