= Japan Transocean Air =

Domestic airline of Japan

Japan Transocean Air Co., Ltd. 日本トランスオーシャン航空株式会社 Nihon Toransuōshan Kōkū Kabushiki-gaisha

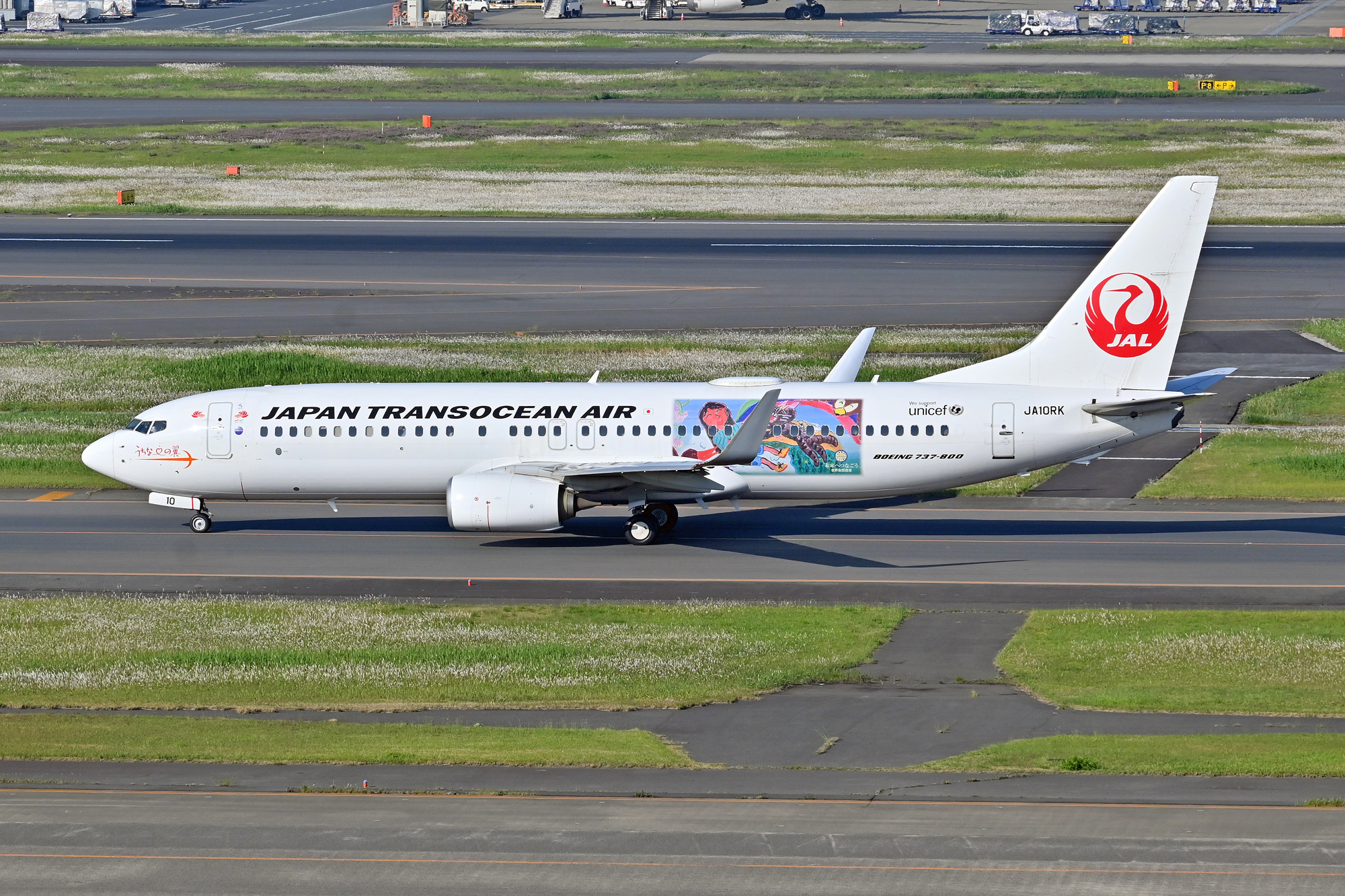
IATA	ICAO	Call sign
NU	JTA	JAI OCEAN
- Founded: June 20, 1967; 59 years ago (as Southwest Air Lines)
- Commenced operations: July 1, 1967; 59 years ago (as Southwest Air Lines); July 1, 1993; 33 years ago (as Japan Transocean Air)
- Hubs: Naha Airport
- Focus cities: New Ishigaki Airport
- Alliance: Oneworld (affiliate)
- Subsidiaries: Ryukyu Air Commuter (74.5%)
- Fleet size: 14
- Destinations: 15
- Parent company: JAL Group (72.8%)
- Headquarters: Naha, Okinawa Prefecture, Japan
- Key people: Nozomi Noguchi (president & CEO)
- Employees: 814 (31 March 2023)
- Website: www.jal.co.jp/jta

Japan Transocean Air (JTA) is an airline based in Naha, Okinawa Prefecture, Japan. It operates domestic services on behalf of Japan Airlines. Its main base is Naha Airport. From 1967 until 1993, the airline was known as Southwest Air Lines.

== History ==
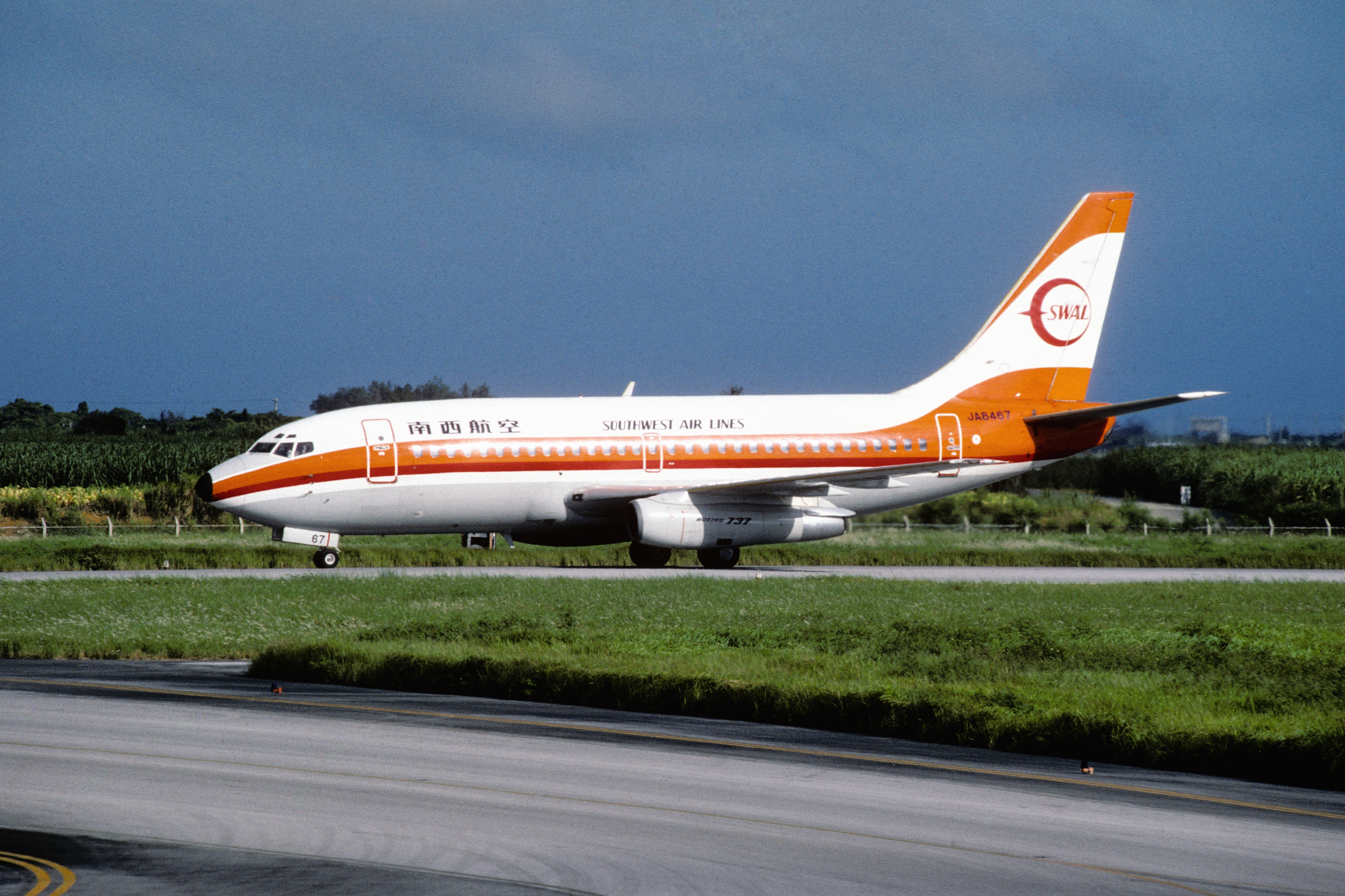
A former Southwest Air Lines Boeing 737-200

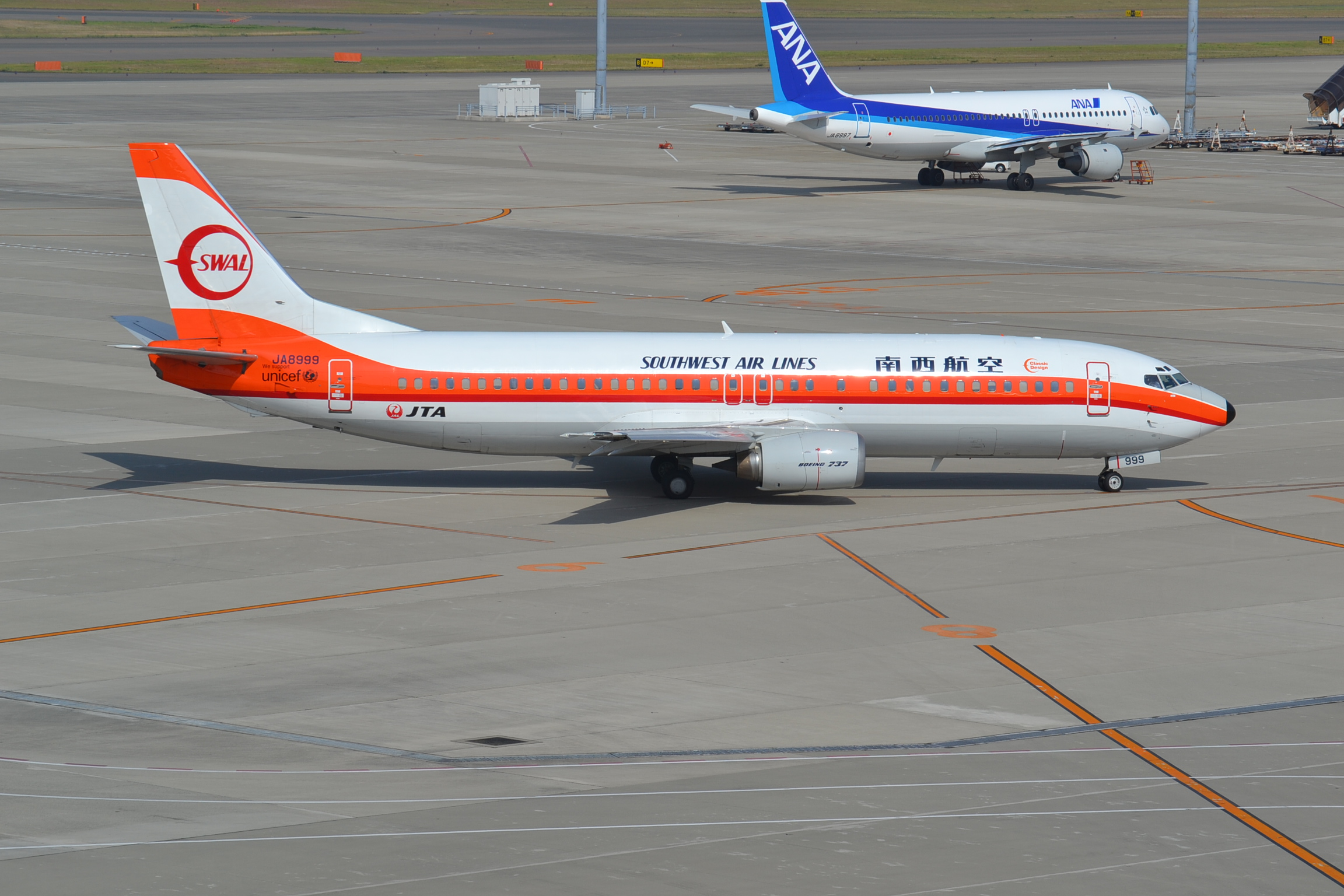
A former JTA Boeing 737-400 in former Southwest Air Lines livery at Chūbu Centrair International Airport, Nagoya, Japan (2013)

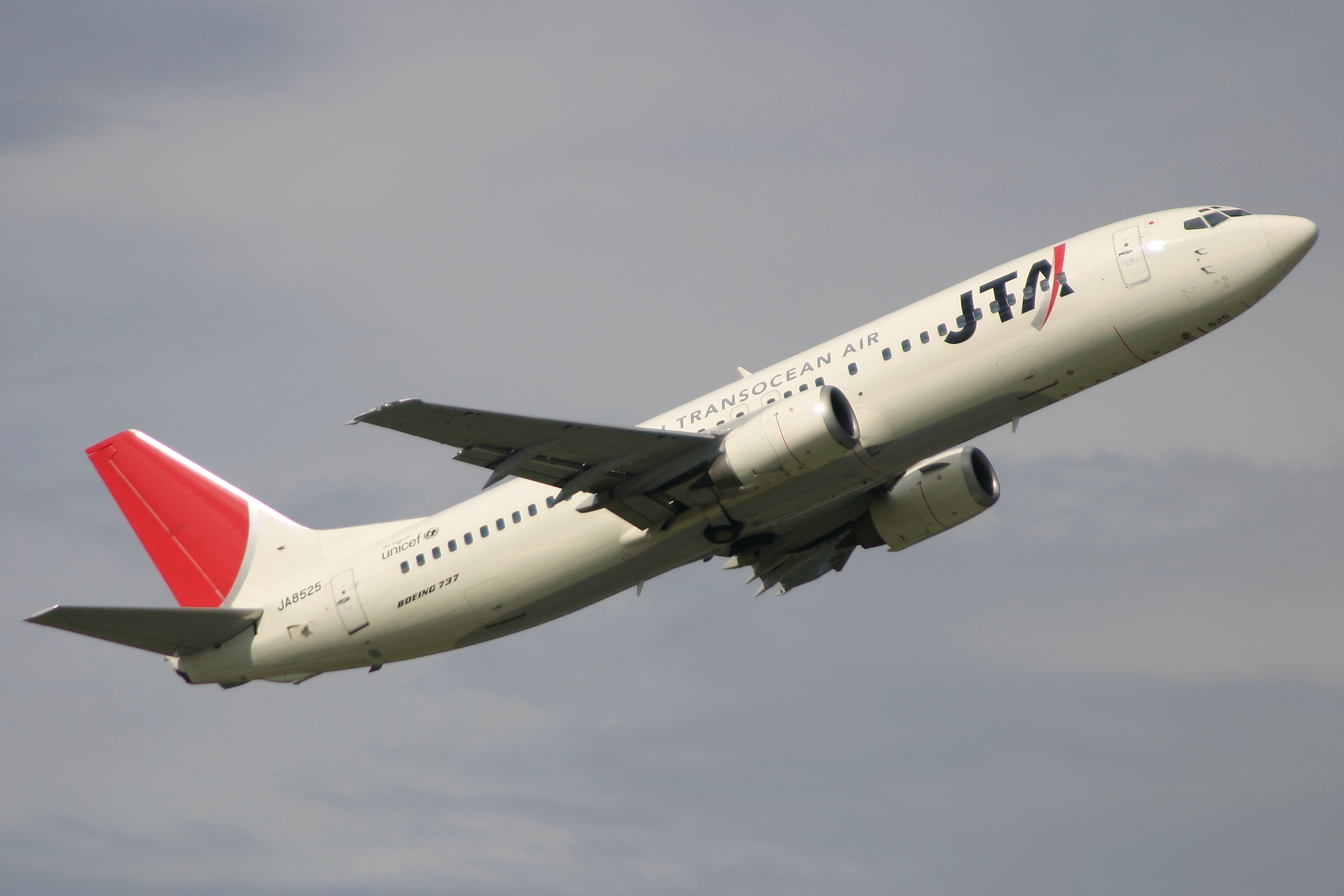
A former JTA Boeing 737-400 (2004)

The airline was established on 20 June 1967 as Southwest Air Lines (南西航空, Nansei Kōkū), and started operations in July 1967. At the time, Okinawa was under U.S. administration, and Japan Air Lines operated the Haneda-Naha route as an international route. Southwest was created as a joint venture between JAL and local companies to provide inter-island service in the Ryukyu Islands, with the support of the local Government of the Ryukyu Islands.

Southwest changed its name to JTA in July 1993. It had 814 employees (in March 2023) and is owned by Japan Airlines (51.1%), Naha Airport Terminal (17%), Okinawa Prefecture (12.9%) and others (19.1%). It flew Convair 240s until new capital from JAL allowed it to upgrade to NAMC YS-11s, and eventually Boeing 737s. JTA occasionally lends aircraft to JAL in the event of equipment failure. JTA also provides maintenance services for JAL Group Boeing 737-400 aircraft. JTA owns 74.5% of Ryukyu Air Commuter. At one time the head office of Southwest Air Lines was at 306-1 Kagamizu in Naha.

== Destinations ==
As of November 2025, Japan Transocean Air flies (or has flown) to the following destinations:

Country	Island	City	Airport	Notes	Refs
Japan	Honshu	Komatsu	Komatsu Airport		
Japan	Honshu	Nagoya	Chubu Centrair International Airport		
Japan	Honshu	Okayama	Okayama Airport		
Japan	Honshu	Osaka	Kansai International Airport		
Japan	Honshu	Osaka	Itami Airport	Resumes 25 October 2026	
Japan	Honshu	Tokyo	Haneda Airport	Terminated	
Japan	Kyushu	Fukuoka	Fukuoka Airport		
Japan	Kyushu	Kagoshima	Kagoshima Airport	Terminated	
Japan	Ryukyu Islands	Ishigaki	Ishigaki Airport	Airport closed	
Japan	Ryukyu Islands	Ishigaki	New Ishigaki Airport	Focus city	
Japan	Ryukyu Islands	Kumejima	Kumejima Airport		
Japan	Ryukyu Islands	Miyakojima	Miyako Airport		
Japan	Ryukyu Islands	Naha	Naha Airport	Hub	
Japan	Ryukyu Islands	Shimojishima	Shimojishima Airport	Terminated	
Japan	Ryukyu Islands	Yonaguni	Yonaguni Airport	Terminated	
Japan	Shikoku	Kōchi	Kōchi Airport	Terminated	
Japan	Shikoku	Matsuyama	Matsuyama Airport	Terminated	
Taiwan	—	Taipei	Taoyuan International Airport		

=== Codeshare agreements ===
Japan Transocean Air currently has a codeshare agreement with the following airlines:

- Japan Airlines

=== Interline agreements ===
Japan Transocean Air also has interline agreements with the following airlines:

- Emirates
- Hawaiian Airlines

== Fleet ==
=== Current fleet ===
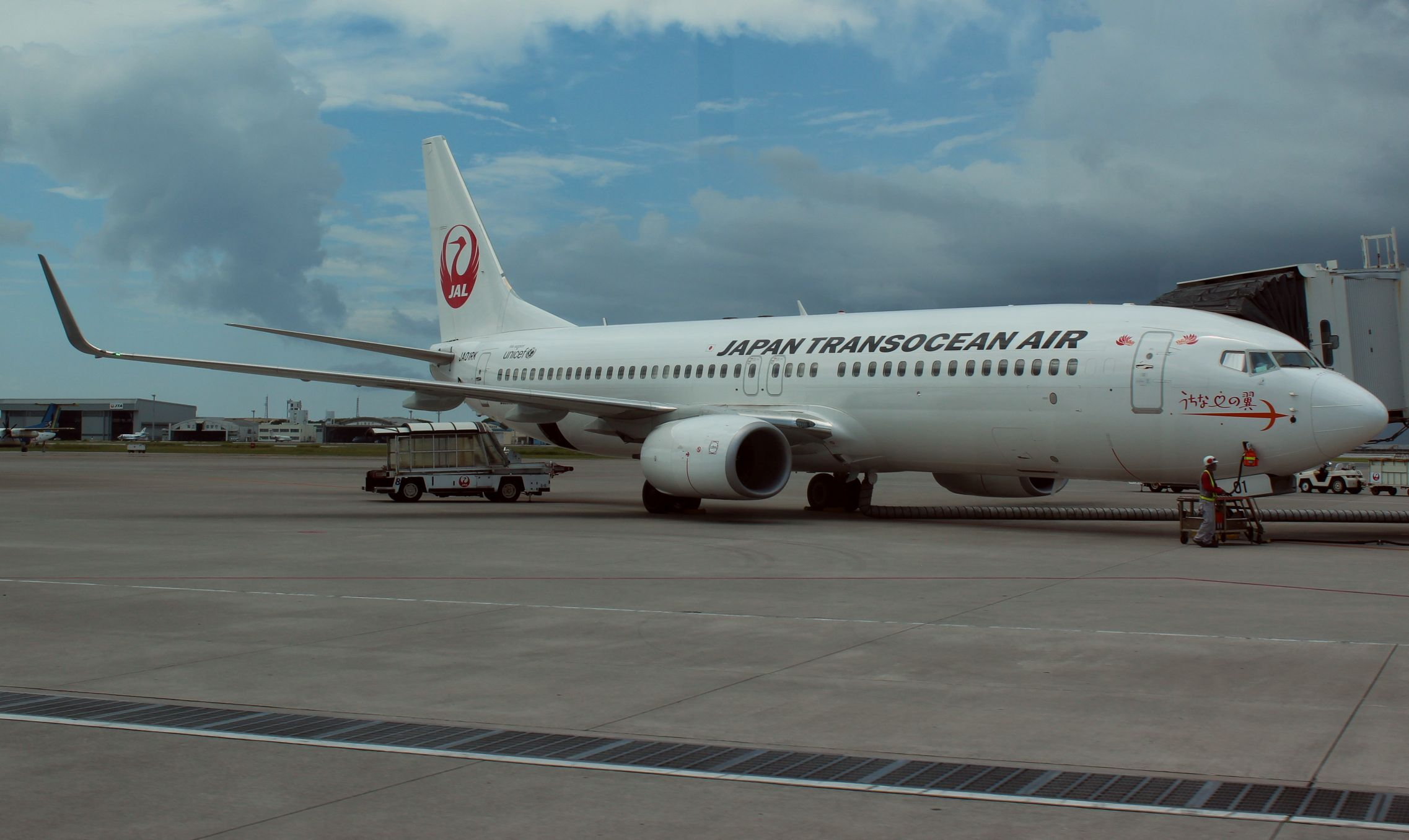
JTA Boeing 737-800

As of July 2026, Japan Transocean Air operates the following aircraft:

Japan Transocean Air fleet
Aircraft type	In fleet	Orders	Passengers			Notes
Aircraft type	In fleet	Orders	J	Y	Total	Notes
Boeing 737-800	14	—	20	145	165	Shared operation with JAL.
Total	14	—				

=== Former fleet ===
As of August 2025, Japan Transocean Air operated 14 Boeing 737-800

Japan Transocean Air also previously operated the following aircraft:

- NAMC YS-11

== Accidents and incidents ==
Since the airline's foundation, there has only been one accident which was under the former Southwest Air Lines brand.

- On 26 August 1982, Southwest Air Lines Flight 611, a Boeing 737-2Q3, registration JA8444, overran the runway at Ishigaki Airport and was destroyed. None of the 138 passengers and crew were killed, but some were injured during the emergency evacuation.
