= Naha Airport =

Commercial airport in Okinawa Prefecture, Japan

Naha Airport 那覇空港
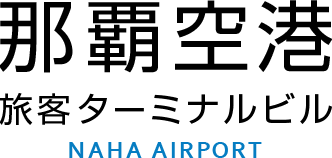

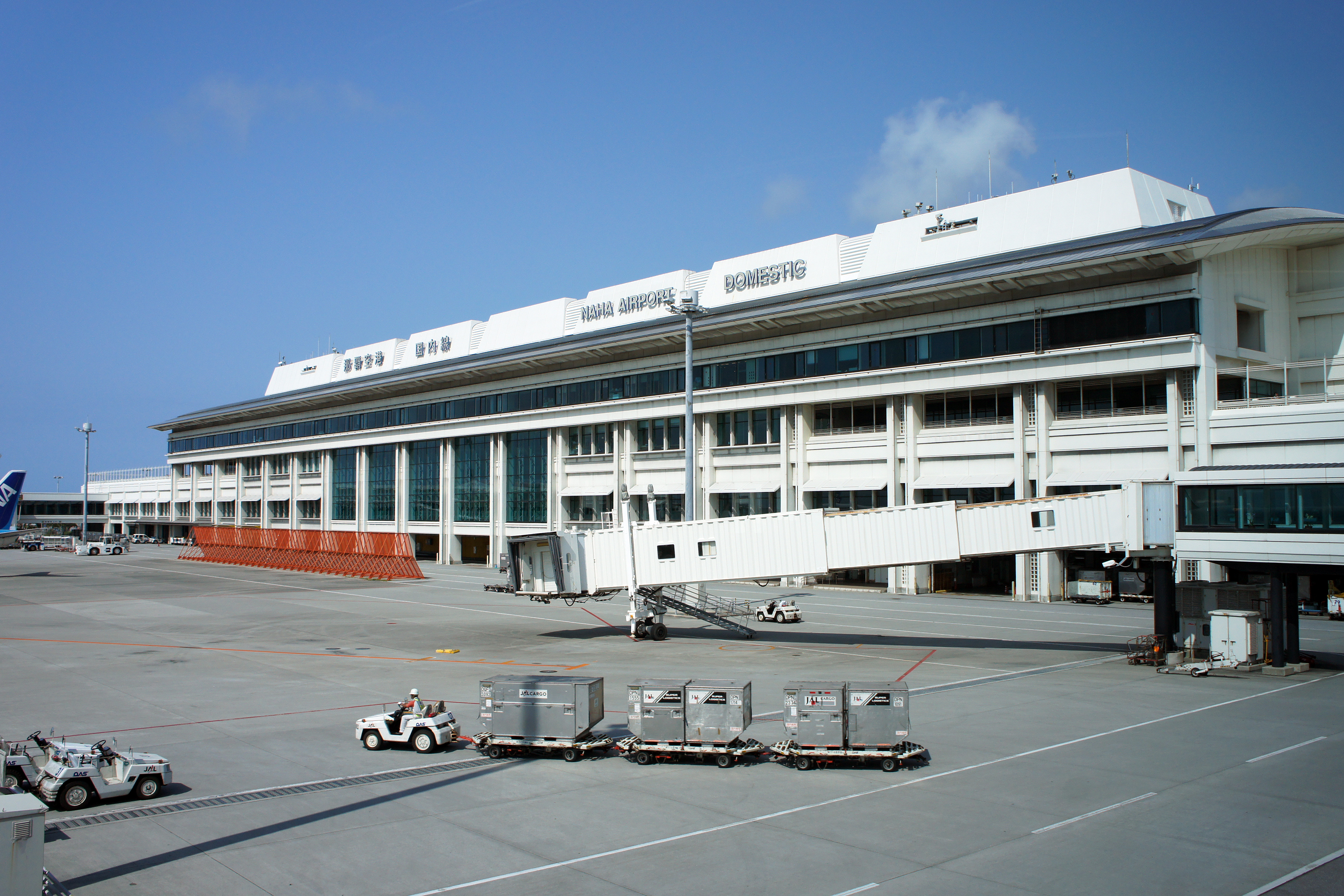
- IATA: OKA; ICAO: ROAH

Summary
- Airport type: Public / military
- Owner/Operator: Ministry of Land, Infrastructure, Transport and Tourism
- Serves: Naha
- Location: Naha, Okinawa Prefecture, Japan
- Opened: 1933; 93 years ago
- Hub for: Japan Transocean Air; Ryukyu Air Commuter
- Focus city for: All Nippon Airways; Japan Airlines; Skymark Airlines
- Operating base for: Peach; Solaseed Air
- Elevation AMSL: 3 m (9.8 ft)
- Coordinates: 26°11′45″N 127°38′45″E
- Website: www.naha-airport.co.jp/en

Map
- Location in Japan OKA/ROAH (Japan)

Runways
Direction	Length		Surface
Direction	m	ft	Surface
18L/36R	3,000	9,843	Asphalt
18R/36L	2,700	8,858	Asphalt

Statistics (2024)
- Passengers: 21,705,234
- Cargo (metric tonnes): 181,206
- Aircraft movement: 158,822
- Source: Datawrapper Japan Travel Bureau Foundation Nippon Centre for Aviation

Naha Airport (那覇空港, Naha Kūkō) (IATA: OKA, ICAO: ROAH) is an international airport located 4 km (2.5 mi) west of the city hall in Naha, Okinawa Prefecture, Japan. It is Japan's sixth busiest airport and the primary air terminal for passengers and cargo traveling to and from Okinawa Prefecture, Japan. It handles scheduled international traffic to Taiwan, Hong Kong, South Korea, Thailand, Malaysia, Singapore and mainland China. Starting in early 2027, it will handle the first direct flight to the United States from Okinawa since the Okinawa Reversion. The airport is also home to Naha Air Base of the Japan Air Self-Defense Force.

Naha Airport is the hub for Japan Transocean Air, which connects Okinawa Prefecture with other prefectures of Japan, and Ryukyu Air Commuter, which connects Okinawa main island with surrounding islands.

Naha Airport operates at 24/7 and served 21.5 million passengers in 2018, an increase of roughly three million passengers in two years. As of 2022, the route between Haneda Airport and Naha Airport is the third busiest in Japan, while the route between Fukuoka Airport and Naha is the seventh busiest. The longest domestic scheduled flight in Japan is the daily route between New Chitose and Naha, operated by Peach Aviation. The flight takes 4 hours.

According to Skytrax's World Top Airports 100 in 2024, Naha Airport is ranked 91st in the world, a significant improvement from 199th place the previous year, making Naha Airport the most improved airport in the world.

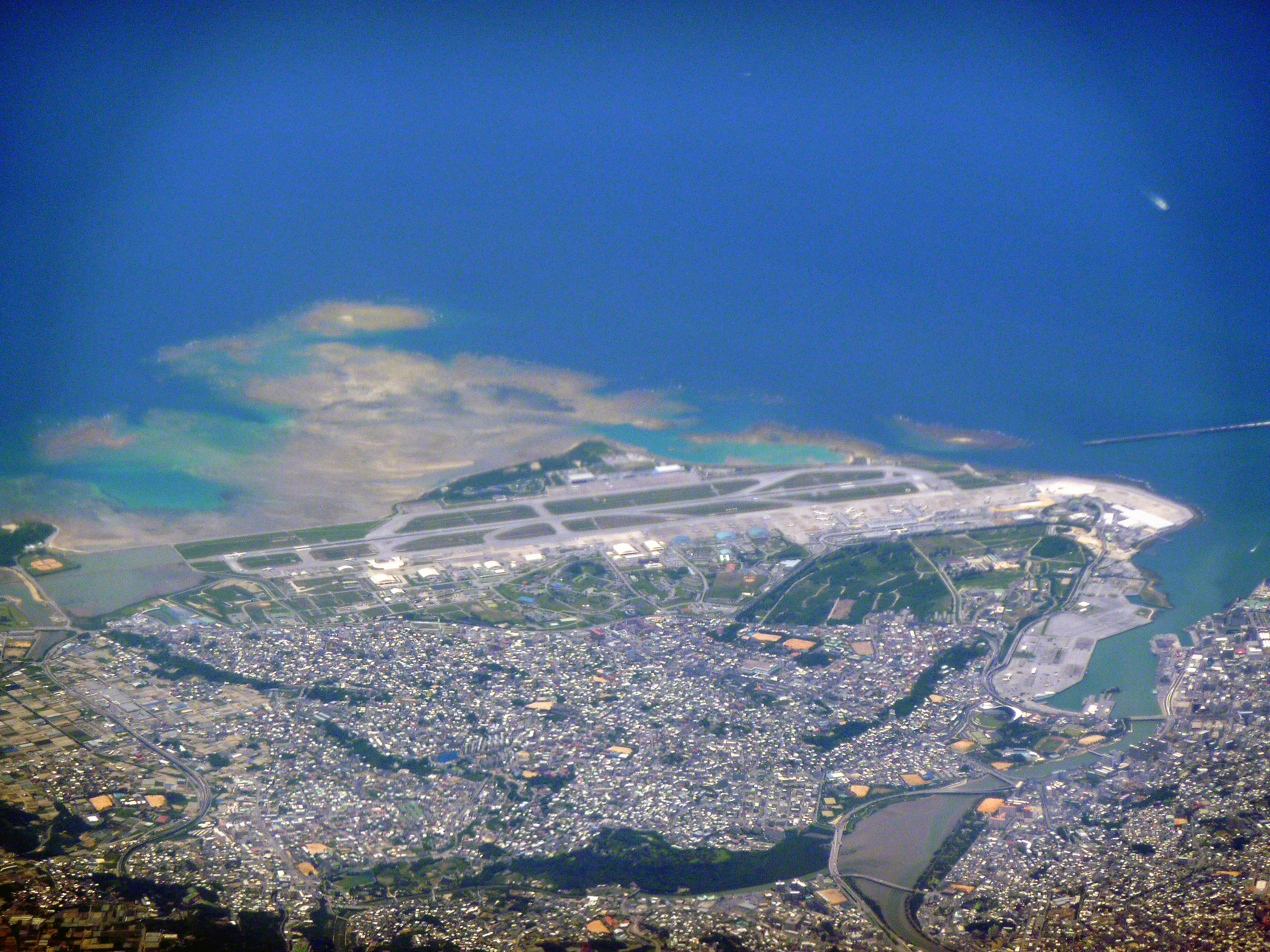
Aerial view of Naha Airport (26 May 2010)

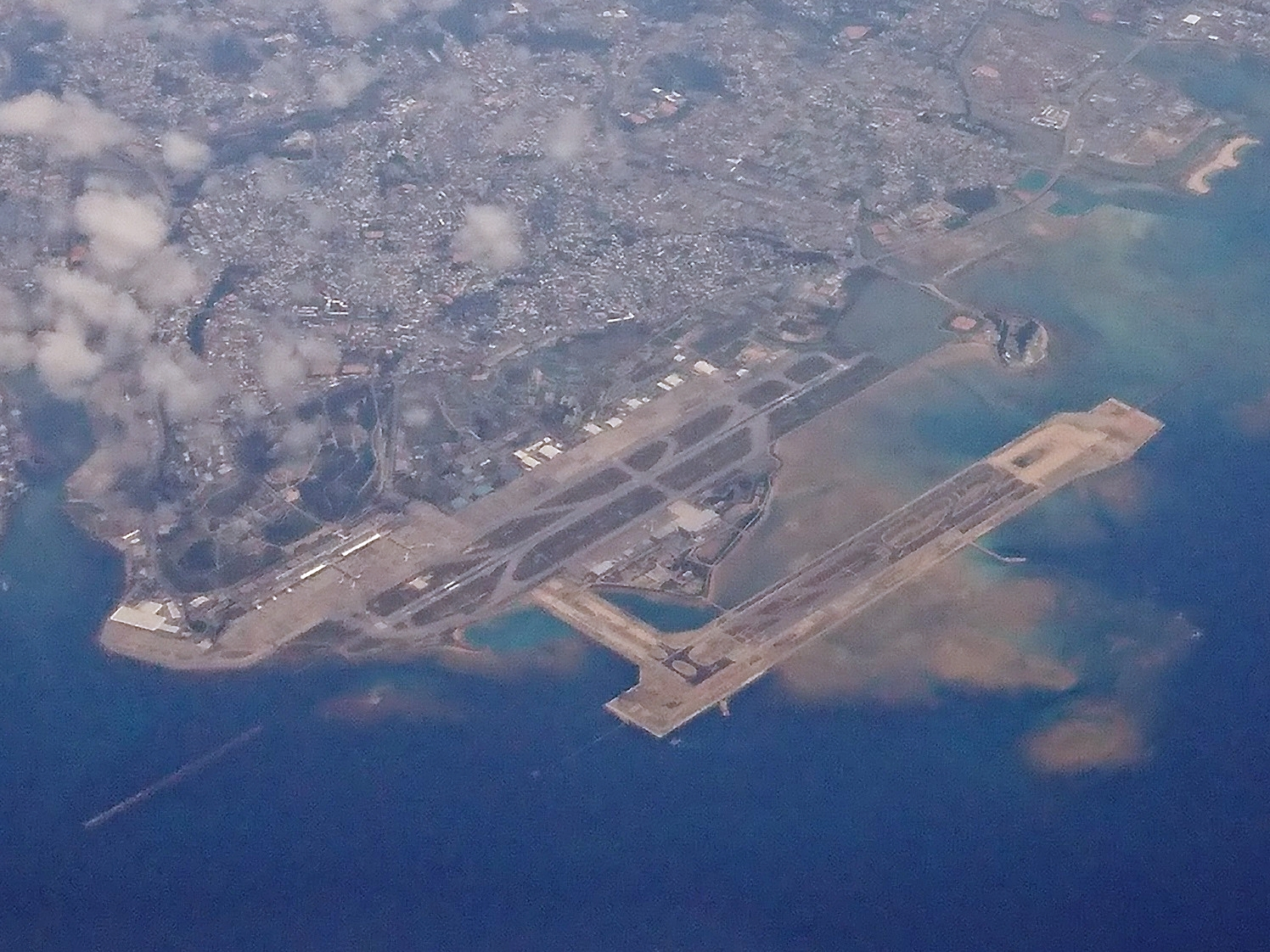
Aerial view of Naha Airport (April 2019) before the completion of the second runway

== History ==
=== Early years ===
Oroku Aerodrome (小禄飛行場), an Imperial Japanese Navy airfield, opened in 1933. The base was taken over by the United States in 1945 and was renamed Naha Airport (那覇飛行場). Pan American World Airways and Northwest Orient began service to Naha in 1947. The airport was closed for refurbishment between 1952 and 1954. Japan Airlines began service to Okinawa during this time and initially used Kadena Air Base.

Air America operated interisland flights to Miyako and Ishigaki from 1964 to 1967, when Southwest Airlines (now Japan Transocean Air) took over these routes. Okinawa was returned to Japan in 1972. In 1982, Naha Airport was transferred from US military control to the Japan Air Self-Defense Force. The basic and detailed design engineering works in addition to the later construction management phase of the main passenger terminal were awarded in the 1990s in part to the Japan Branch of the American design-build engineering company, The Austin Company, which joined Japanese firms in a joint venture design consortium.

=== Development ===
The airport has been undergoing major development projects that will continue to transform the airport. In 2008, the government of Japan agreed to significantly expand the domestic terminal, which will require the relocation of cargo facilities and the international terminal.

The construction of a second 2,700 m (8,900 ft) parallel runway began on March 1, 2014 on 160 hectares (400 acres) of an artificial island.

The new international terminal opened in February 2014. The international terminal was again expanded by 3,000 m^{2} (32,000 sq ft) in November 2016. A new building connecting the domestic and international terminals was completed in 2019, the second runway began operation on March 26 2020.

A LCCT terminal has been in operation since 2012. A six-lane under bay tunnel for auto transport linking the airport with the Naha Port boosting the utility of the intermodal facility was completed in 2011. This tunnel will also link a 2.6-hectare (6.4-acre) Free Trade Zone near the Airport with another 122-hectare (300-acre) FTZ located at Nakagusuku Bay. Peach, a low-cost carrier (LCC) based at Kansai International Airport in Osaka, announced that it would establish its second hub at Naha in July 2014, which would initially have flights to Osaka, Fukuoka, Ishigaki and Taipei. ANA Holdings, the parent company of both Peach and Vanilla Air, opened a new LCC terminal in a refurbished portion of the airport's cargo area in October 2012, and plans to open new international facilities in October 2014.

== Terminals ==
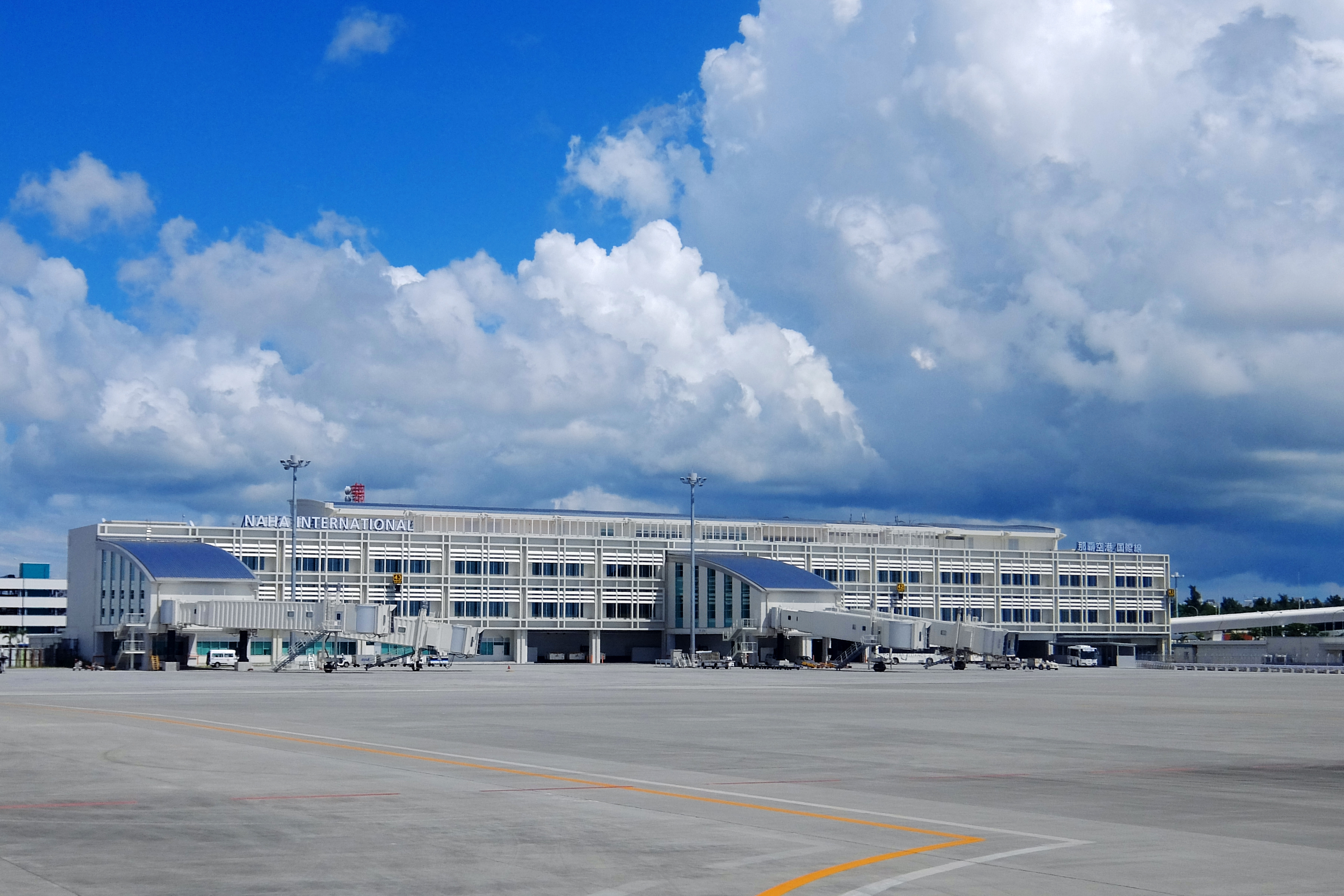
International terminal building

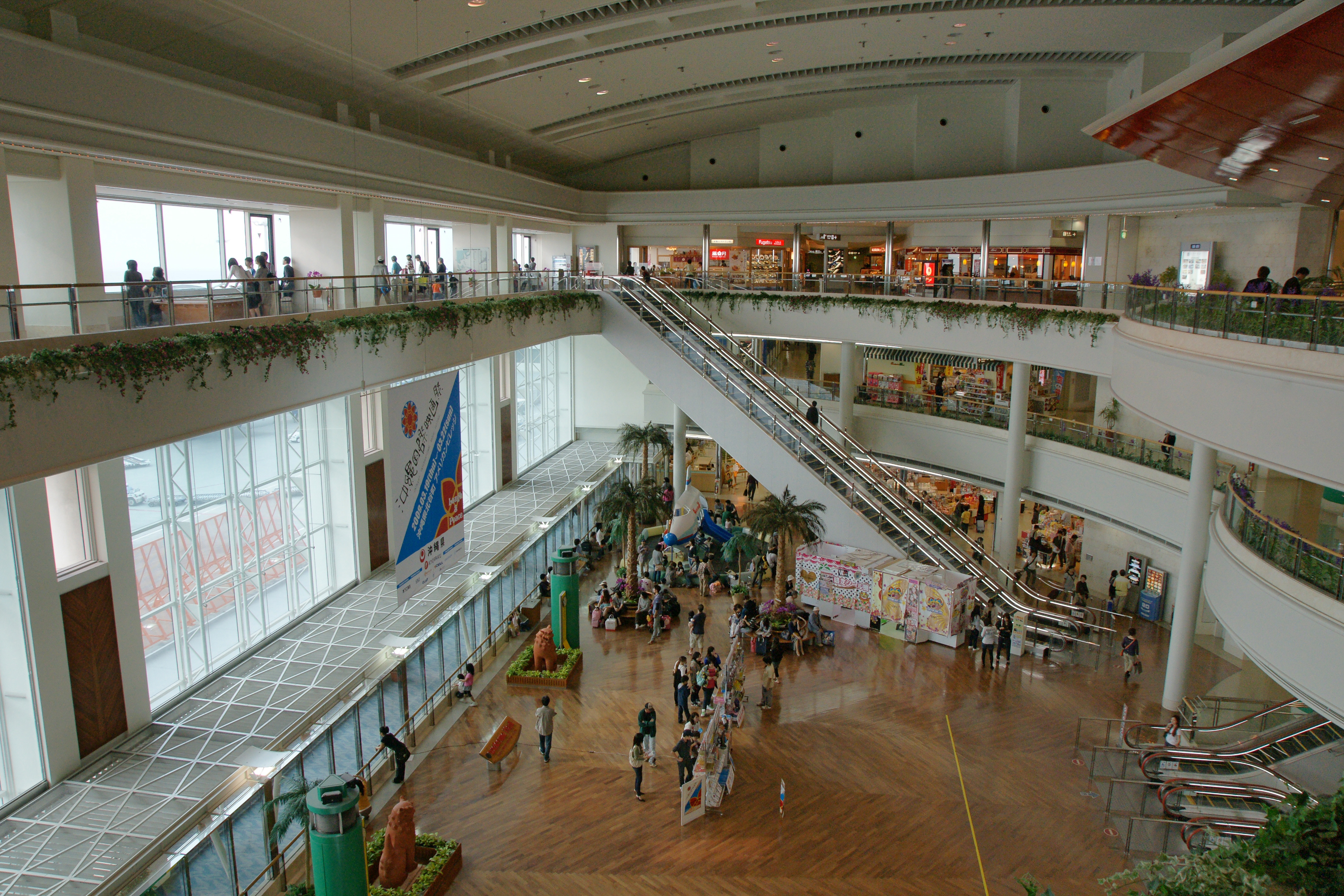
Interior of the domestic terminal building

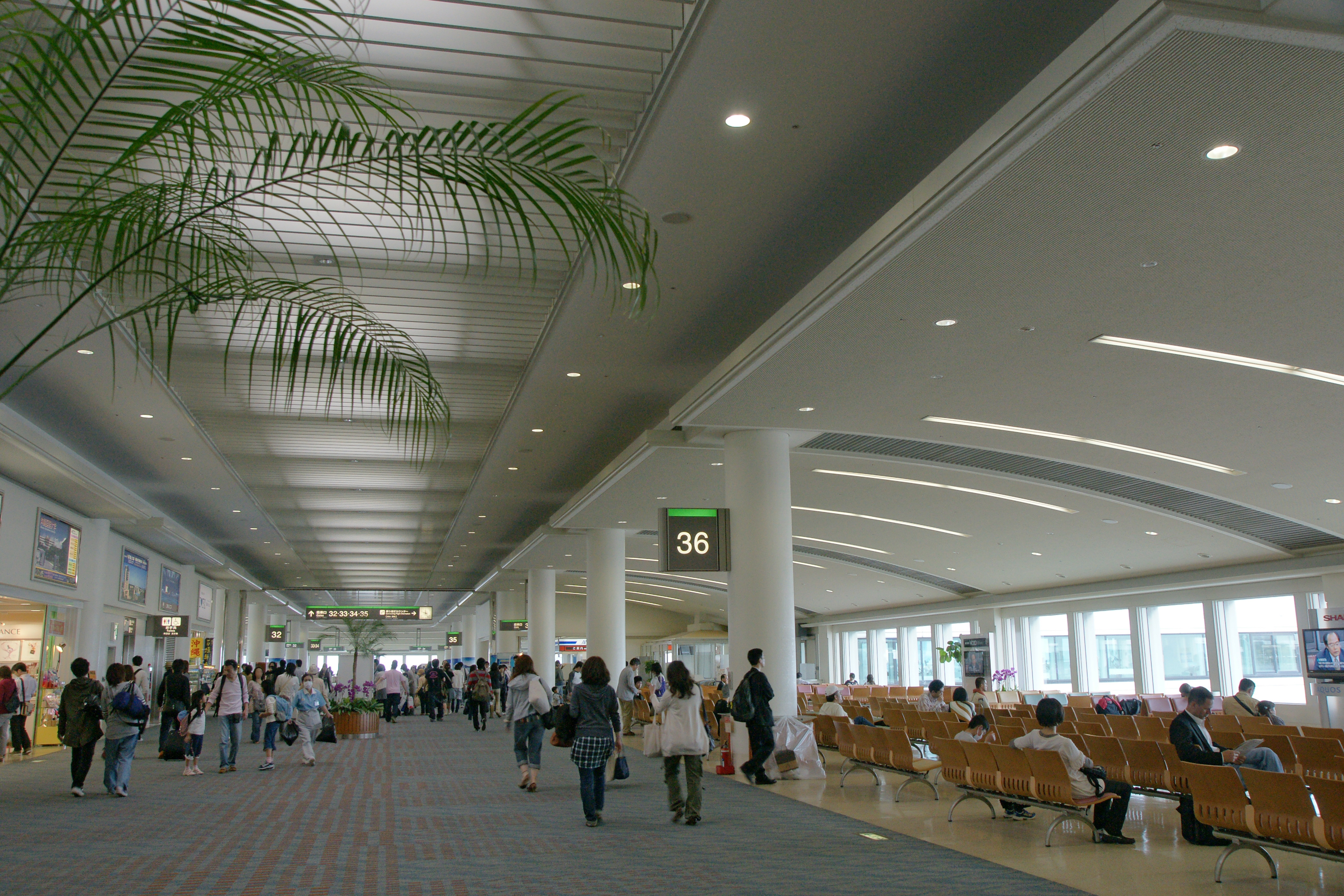
Departure lobby of the domestic terminal

- Domestic Terminal (1999) - replaced former domestic terminal, extended to include LCCT, other extensions works to conclude in 2016.
- Cargo Terminal (2009) - Former domestic terminal became the cargo terminal
- LCCT Terminal (2012) - north annex of domestic terminal (Peach Domestic & International only).
- New International Terminal (2014) - replaced old international terminal
- New Integrated Terminal (2019) - The building connecting the domestic and international terminals was completed and began integrated operation.

== Airlines and destinations ==
=== Passenger ===
Airlines	Destinations
Aero K	Cheongju, Seoul–Incheon
AirAsia	Bangkok–Don Mueang, Kaohsiung, Taipei-Taoyuan
Air China	Beijing-Capital
All Nippon Airways	Fukuoka, Hiroshima, Ishigaki, Iwakuni, Kumamoto, Matsuyama, Miyakojima, Nagoya-Chubu, Osaka-Itami, Sendai, Tokyo-Haneda
Asiana Airlines	Seoul–Incheon
Batik Air Malaysia	Taipei-Taoyuan
China Airlines	Kaohsiung, Taichung, Taipei-Taoyuan
China Eastern Airlines	Shanghai-Pudong
Eastar Jet	Busan, Seoul–Incheon
EVA Air	Taipei-Taoyuan
Greater Bay Airlines	Hong Kong
HK Express	Hong Kong
Hongkong Airlines	Hong Kong
Japan Airlines	Osaka–Itami, Tokyo-Haneda
Japan Transocean Air	Fukuoka, Ishigaki, Komatsu, Kumejima, Miyakojima, Nagoya-Chubu, Okayama, Osaka–Itami, Osaka-Kansai, Taipei-Taoyuan, Tokyo-Haneda
Jeju Air	Seoul–Incheon
Jetstar Japan	Kaohsiung (begins December 6, 2026), Nagoya-Chubu, Osaka-Kansai, Tokyo-Narita
Jin Air	Busan, Seoul–Incheon
Korean Air	Seoul–Incheon
Peach Aviation	Fukuoka, Nagoya-Chubu, Osaka-Kansai, Sapporo-Chitose, Taipei-Taoyuan, Tokyo-Narita
Ryukyu Air Commuter	Kita-Daito, Kumejima, Minami-Daito, Miyako, Yonaguni, Yoron
Scoot	Singapore
Skymark Airlines	Miyako, Tokyo-Haneda
Solaseed Air	Fukuoka, Ishigaki, Kagoshima, Kobe, Miyazaki, Nagoya-Chubu, Tokyo-Haneda
Spring Airlines Japan	Shanghai-Pudong
Starlux Airlines	Taichung, Taipei-Taoyuan
Thai AirAsia	Bangkok–Don Mueang
Thai Lion Air	Bangkok–Don Mueang, Kaohsiung
Thai VietJet Air	Bangkok–Suvarnabhumi
Tigerair Taiwan	Kaohsiung, Taichung, Tainan, Taipei-Taoyuan
Trinity Airways	Seoul–Incheon
United Airlines	San Francisco (begins 27 March 2027)
Xiamen Airlines	Fuzhou

=== Cargo service ===
All Nippon Airways operates an overnight cargo hub at Naha Airport, which receives inbound Boeing 767 freighter flights from key destinations in Japan, China and Southeast Asia between 1 and 4 a.m., followed by return flights between 4 and 6 a.m., allowing overnight service between these regional hubs as well as onward connections to other ANA and partner carrier flights.

The hub began operations in 2009; by 2013 it served eight cities, and ANA had chartered a Nippon Cargo Airlines Boeing 747 freighter to handle demand on the trunk route from Narita International Airport.

== Accidents and incidents ==
- On July 27, 1970, Flying Tiger Line Flight 45, a Douglas DC-8-63AF flying to Da Nang Air Force Base from Los Angeles via San Francisco and Tokyo, was on its final approach when it crashed 0.4 miles short of Runway 18, killing all 4 crew members.
- On December 11, 1994, Armaldo Forlani (Ramzi Yousef) planted a bomb on Philippine Airlines Flight 434, which exploded while the flight was en route from Cebu to Tokyo, killing one passenger and injuring ten other passengers. The plane made an emergency landing at Naha Airport safely.
- On August 20, 2007, China Airlines Flight 120, a Boeing 737-800, was taxiing to the ramp after landing when suddenly a fire started beneath the right wing, quickly engulfing the entire plane. All passengers and crew members were evacuated safely. Investigations later revealed that part of the slat drive mechanism pierced the fuel tank, and the leaking fuel ignited when it came into contact with hot engine parts.
- On June 3, 2015, an All Nippon Airways Boeing 737 bound for Sapporo aborted takeoff at Naha after a JASDF CH-47 Chinook helicopter crossed its departure path without clearance. An inbound Japan Transocean Air flight landed on the same runway, stopping 400 meters behind the ANA aircraft, despite an air traffic control order to go around, which the JTA pilot claimed to have received after landing.
- On December 4, 2020, Japan Airlines Flight 904, operated by a Boeing 777-200 from Okinawa Naha airport to Tokyo Haneda suffered a fan blade failure in one of its two PW4084 engines. None of the 189 occupants on board were injured in the incident.

== Access ==
The airport is served by the Okinawa Urban Monorail (Yui Rail) which carries passengers from Naha Airport Station to the center of Naha, and to the terminal at Tedako-Uranishi Station in Urasoe. Bus service is also available to many parts of Okinawa Island.
