= Miyako Airport =

Miyako Airport 宮古空港
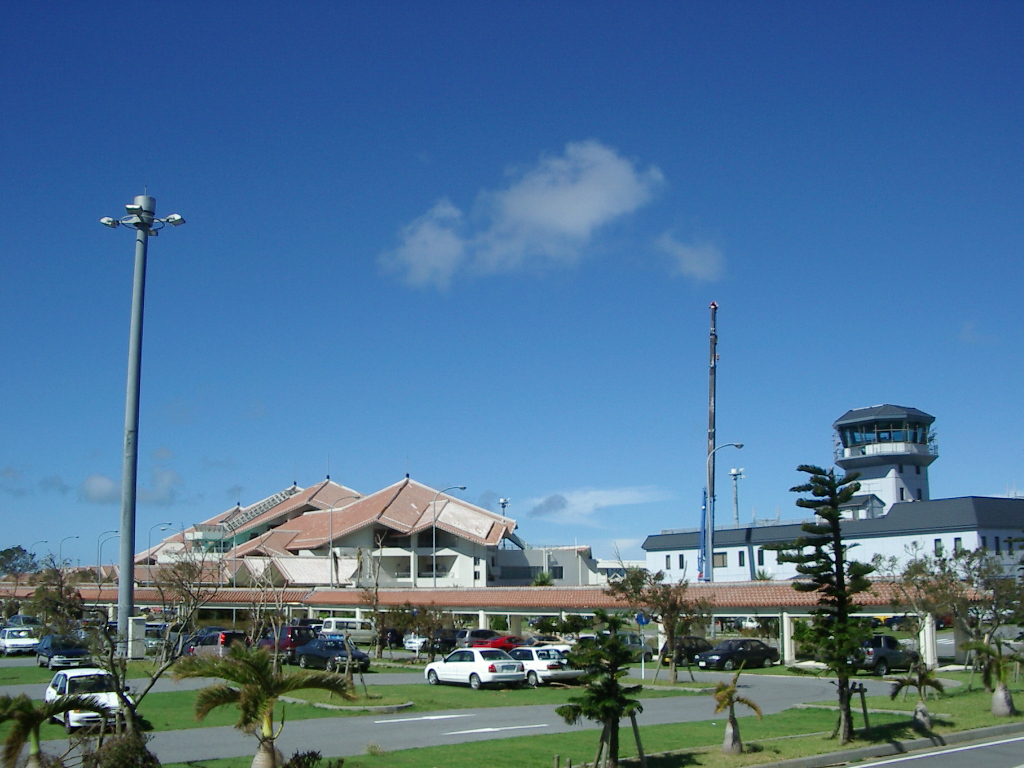
- IATA: MMY; ICAO: ROMY

Summary
- Airport type: Public
- Operator: Okinawa Prefecture
- Serves: Miyakojima, Okinawa
- Location: Miyakojima, Okinawa, Japan
- Opened: 1943; 83 years ago
- Elevation AMSL: 140 ft (43 m)
- Coordinates: 24°46′58″N 125°17′42″E
- Website: http://miyakoap.co.jp/

Map
- Location in Japan ROMY (Japan)

Runways
| Direction | Length | | Surface |
| Direction | m | ft | Surface |
|---|---|---|---|
| 04/22 | 2,000 | 6,562 | Asphalt concrete |

Statistics (2015)
- Passengers: 1,335,697
- Cargo (metric tonnes): 10,938
- Aircraft movement: 15,590
- Source: Japanese Ministry of Land, Infrastructure, Transport and Tourism

Miyako Airport (宮古空港, Miyako Kūkō; (IATA: MMY, ICAO: ROMY)) is an airport on Miyako-jima (Miyako Island) in Miyakojima, Okinawa, Japan.

Miyako Islands are a group of islands that have beautiful coral reefs, and one of the most popular year-round resort destinations in Okinawa Prefecture. In 2019, the airport had 1.74 million passengers, making it the third busiest airport in Okinawa Prefecture. Japan Airlines, All Nippon Airways, Japan Transocean Air, and Ryukyu Air Commuter serve the airport.

Shimojishima Airport, which has a 3,000 m (9,800 ft) runway, is nearby, and Jetstar Japan began regular flights there in 2019. Skymark Airlines also began operating flights to Shimojishima Airport after that, so the two airports are in competition with each other.

== History ==
The airport opened in 1943 as an Imperial Japanese Navy airbase. Civilian operations commenced in 1956. Jet service commenced in 1978 using Boeing 737s.

Japan Airlines provides nonstop service to Tokyo (Haneda Airport) operated by Japan Transocean Air. All Nippon Airways commenced nonstop service to Tokyo (Haneda Airport) in 2016, using slots freed up by the cessation of Hokuriku region air services following the opening of the Hokuriku Shinkansen.

== Facilities ==
Miyako Airport has a single three-story terminal building with five gates. The terminal includes four restaurants including a A&W, a shopping promenade and an observation deck. The airport has parking berths for three mid-sized jet aircraft.

== Airlines and destinations ==
=== Passenger ===
| Airlines | Destinations |
|---|---|
| All Nippon Airways | Nagoya–Centrair, Naha, Tokyo–Haneda; Seasonal: Fukuoka |
| ANA Wings | Ishigaki, Naha |
| Japan Airlines | Tokyo–Haneda |
| Japan Transocean Air | Naha |
| Ryukyu Air Commuter | Ishigaki, Tarama |

== See also ==
- Naval Base Okinawa
