= Kabir (disambiguation) =

Kabir (c. 1440–c. 1518) was a mystic poet and saint of India.

Kabir or the alternative Kabeer may also refer to:

== People ==
=== Given name ===
Kabir

- Kabir Ali (born 1980), English cricketer
- Kabir Akhtar (born 1975), American television director and Emmy Award-winning editor
- Kabir Bedi (born 1946), Indian television and film actor
- Kabir Duhan Singh (born 1986), Indian film actor
- Kabir Hashim (born 1959), Sri Lankan politician and economist
- Kabir Khan (disambiguation)
  - Kabir Khan (cricketer) (born 1974), Pakistani cricketer
  - Kabir Khan (director) (born 1968), Indian film director, screenwriter and cinematographer
- Kabir Sadanand, Indian actor and film director
- Kabir Rafi (born 1993), South Indian music director, composer, and singer
- Kabir Stori (1942-2006), Afghan poet and writer
- Kabir Suman (born 1949), Indian singer, songwriter, music director, poet, novelist, journalist
- John Abraham (born 1972), who often portrays characters named Kabir

Kabeer

- Kabeer Gbaja-Biamila (born 1977), American football defensive end
- Kabeer Kaushik, Indian film director and screenwriter playwright

=== Surname ===
Kabir

- Alamgir Kabir (film maker) (1938-1989), Bangladeshi film director
- Alamgir Kabir (cricketer) (born 1981), Bangladeshi test cricketer
- Amir Kabir (1807–1852), Persian politician
- Altamas Kabir (1948-2017), a Chief Justice of India
- Fazle Kabir (born 1955), Bangladeshi economist and banker
- Humayun Kabir, several individuals with this name
- Jayasree Kabir (born 1952), Bengali film actress
- Rez Kabir, Bangladeshi-born British stage and film actor
- Rezaul Kabir, Bangladeshi financial economist
- Sanober Kabir, Indian Bollywood actress

El Kabir

- Moestafa El Kabir (born 1988), Moroccan footballer

Kabeer

- Naila Kabeer (born 1950), Indian-born British Bangladeshi social economist, researcher and writer
- Rokeya Rahman Kabeer (1925-2000), Bangladeshi academic and feminist

Al Kabeer

- Hasabu Al-Kabeer (1940-2011), Sudanese footballer

== Places ==
- Kabir, Kerman, a village in Kerman Province, Iran
- Kabir, Razavi Khorasan, a village in Razavi Khorasan Province, Iran

== Other uses ==
- Kabir (teacher), Harari title
- Kabir, a kind of Bedouin arbitrator, see Bedouin systems of justice
- Kabir (film), a 2018 Bengali film
- Kabir Singh, a 2019 Hindi film
- Bhakta Kabir, a 1942 Indian film
- Mahatma Kabir (disambiguation)
  - Mahatma Kabir (film), a 1947 Indian Kannada-language film
  - Mahathma Kabir, a 1962 Indian Kannada film
- The Suite Life of Karan & Kabir, sitcom on Disney Channel India
- Kabir, fictional criminal featured in the 2004 Indian film Dhoom, played by John Abraham
- Kabir, fictional police officer played by Abraham in the 2016 Indian film Dishoom
- Kabir Ahlawat, fictional character played by Abraham in the 2016 Indian film Rocky Handsome
- Major Kabir Dhaliwal, a fictional Indian Army major and RAW agent in the YRF Spy Universe, played by Hritik Roshan
- Kabir Kaul, fictional character in the 2019 Indian film Notebook, portrayed by Zaheer Iqbal
- Kabir Lal, fictional character played by Abraham in the 2003 Indian film Jism

== See also ==
- Kabira (disambiguation)
- Kabiri (disambiguation)
- Al-Kabir (disambiguation)
- Mubarak Al-Kabeer (disambiguation)
- Saud al-Kabir (disambiguation)
- Kabir Panth, a Hindu sect, followers of Kabir
