= Kabira =

Kabira may refer to:

- Kabira Bay, a bay in the northwestern part of Ishigaki Island, Ryukyu, Japan
- Kabira, Okinawa, a village near Kabira Bay in the northwestern part of Ishigaki Island, Ryukyu, Japan
- "Kabira" (song), a song from the 2013 Bollywood movie Yeh Jawaani Hai Deewani

== See also ==
- Kabir (disambiguation)
