= Ishigaki Island =

Island within Ryukyu Islands

Ishigaki
Native name: Ishangï
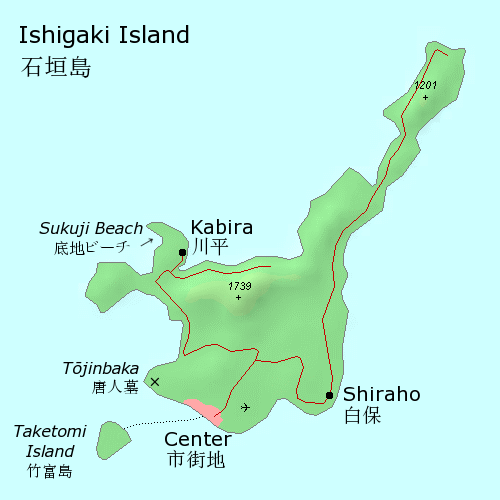

- Location within Japan

Geography
- Location: Pacific Ocean
- Coordinates: 24.44°N 124.22°E
- Archipelago: Yaeyama Islands
- Area: 222.24 km^{2} (85.81 sq mi)
- Highest elevation: 525.5 m (1724.1 ft)
- Highest point: Mount Omoto

Administration
- Japan
- Prefecture: Okinawa Prefecture

Demographics
- Population: 47,564 (January 2019)
- Ethnic groups: Ryukyuan, Japanese

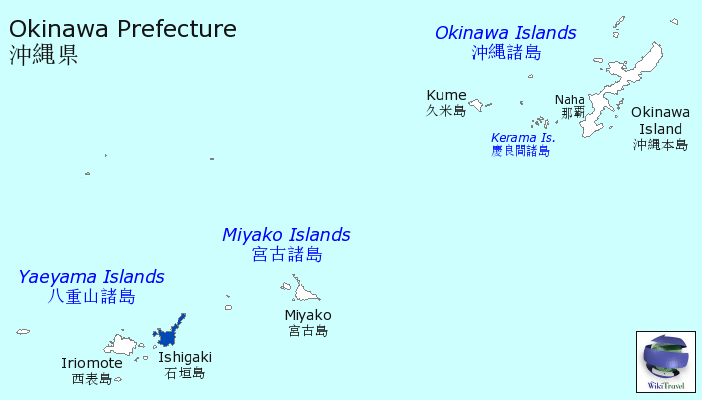
Location of Ishigaki Island in Okinawa Prefecture

Various scenes around Ishigaki Island, 2019

Ishigaki Island (Japanese: 石垣島, Hepburn: Ishigakijima; Japanese pronunciation: [ì.ɕí.ɡä́.k̟ʲí(.(ɟ̟͡)ʑí.mä́), -ŋä́-]; Yaeyama: Ishanagï; Okinawan: Ishigachi) is a Japanese island south-west of Okinawa Hontō and the second-largest island of the Yaeyama Island group, behind Iriomote Island. It is located approximately 411 km (255 mi) south-west of Okinawa Hontō. It is within the City of Ishigaki in Okinawa Prefecture. The city functions as the business and transport center of the archipelago. The island is served by New Ishigaki Airport, the largest airport in the Yaeyamas.

Much of the island and surrounding waters including Mount Omoto and Kabira Bay are protected as part of Iriomote-Ishigaki National Park.

Ishigaki Island, like the rest of Okinawa, is culturally influenced by both Japan and Taiwan due to its location, about 300 km (186 mi) off the north eastern coast of Taiwan.

== History ==
A tsunami of record height hit Ishigaki Island in 1771.

One of the perpetrators of Aum Shinrikyo's sarin gas attack, Yasuo Hayashi, was arrested on Ishigaki Island 21 months after the attacks and 2,000 km (1,243 mi) from the scene of the crime.

On 11 April 2024, locals protested against the Japanese military's presence.

== Ishigaki Port ==
Located 400 km (249 mi) southwest of Okinawa Island and 259 km (161 mi) east of Keelung, Ishigaki serves as a gateway to the Yaeyama Islands. Ishigaki Port is the 5th most popular of Japan's cruise ports as of 2017, and 4th for port calls by non-Japanese ships with a weekly call by Star Cruises from Taiwan. Several companies offer daily ferry service to Hateruma, Iriomote, Kohama, and Taketomi Island.

Due to Japan's increased focus on grey-zone challenges, Ishigaki Port has been expanded so more than a dozen large (over 1,000 tons) Japan Coast Guard ships can be stationed there. There are currently 11 Kunigami-class large patrol vessels and 2 Hateruma-class large patrol vessels, as well as a Bizan-class small patrol vessel, and a Kagayuki-class patrol craft have been homeported at Ishigaki along with facilities for housing up to 600 crew, making Ishigaki JCG's largest base, surpassing JCG's facilities in Yokohama.

Tokyo has currently earmarked ¥21.2 billion yen (US$205 million) in FY2021 to build new patrol boats and buy helicopters for the region, with plans to assign 22 ships of over 1,000 tons (including the 3 Tsugarus, a Kunigami, and a Hateruma class patrol vessel based in Naha) in the region by 2024. Tokyo has also bulked up the JCG presence on Miyako-jima between Ishigaki and Naha with nine Shimoji-class small patrol vessels and a Tokara-class medium patrol vessel

The Japan Self-Defense Forces (JSDF) are also considering deploying short range anti-ship missiles (possibly the Type 96 multi-purpose missile system) on the island.

These reinforcements are mostly in relation to the Japanese uninhabited Senkaku Islands, which lie 170 km (106 mi) north of Ishigaki and are under the control of the mayor of Ishigaki, which has been given civic authority over the territory since the Senkaku Islands reverted from the US to the Japanese government control in 1972. China and to a lesser extent Taiwan have challenged Japan's sovereignty over these islands since 1972, with more intensity since 2012.

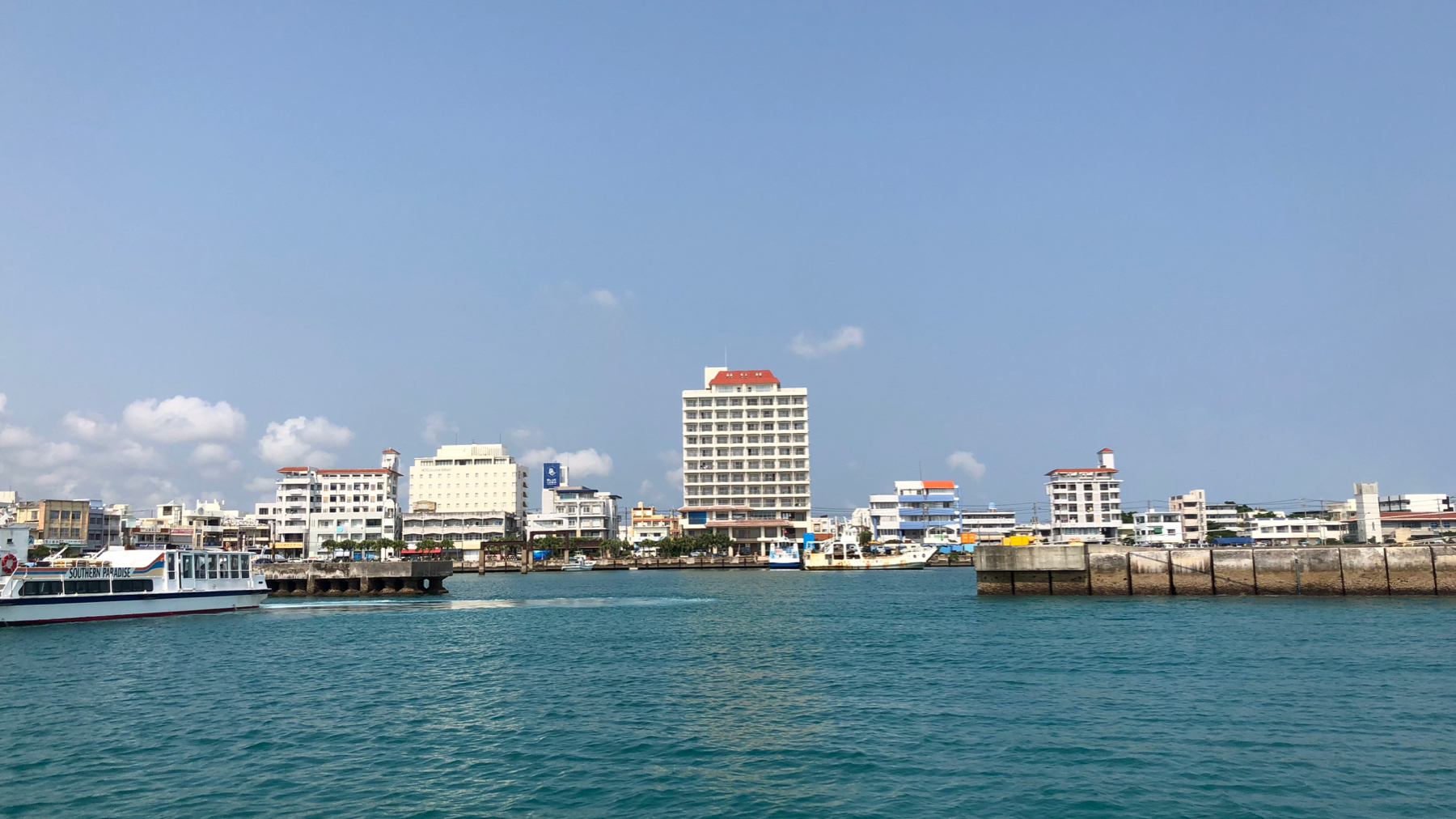
Ishigaki port

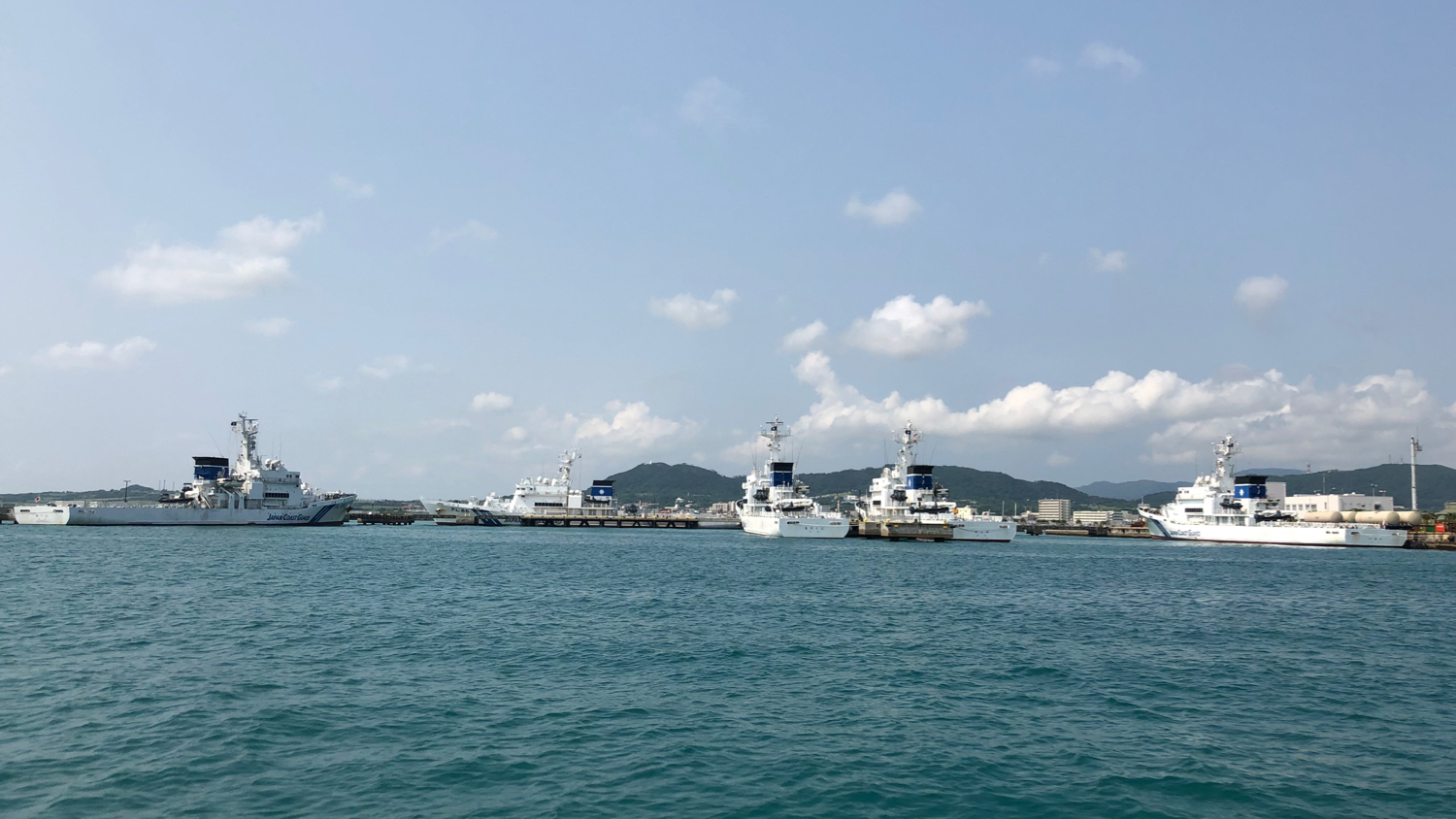
Japan Coast Guard vessels at Port of Ishigaki

== Culture ==
- Miyaradunchi is a residence erected around 1819 by the local governor, it has been designated an Important Cultural Property as representative of the architecture of the Yaeyama Islands.

== Food ==
Ishigaki has different cuisine from mainland Japan. Due to the relative warmth of the surrounding sea and various cultural influences, the food of Ishigaki and Okinawa is more meat-centered than the rest of Japan. The Ryukyu Kingdom served as an important trading post between Japan and the rest of the world despite various trading bans between Japan and China.

Located only 244 km (152 mi) from Taiwan, Okinawan cuisine is best defined by the Okinawan word Chanpurū (チャンプルー) or "something mixed", incorporating aspects of Chinese, Japanese, Southeast Asian, and American cultures. Although Okinawa is best known for its love of pig, Ishigaki is famous for its Japanese Black cattle, both which are thought to have originally been brought from China as far back as the Yayoi period. Ishigaki is also unique in its use of spice and tropical fruits mainland Japanese palates tend to be unaccustomed with.

== Flora ==
Satakentia liukiuensis, the only species in the genus Satakentia, is a palm tree that is endemic to the two islands of Ishigaki and Iriomote in the Yaeyama Islands.

== Gallery ==
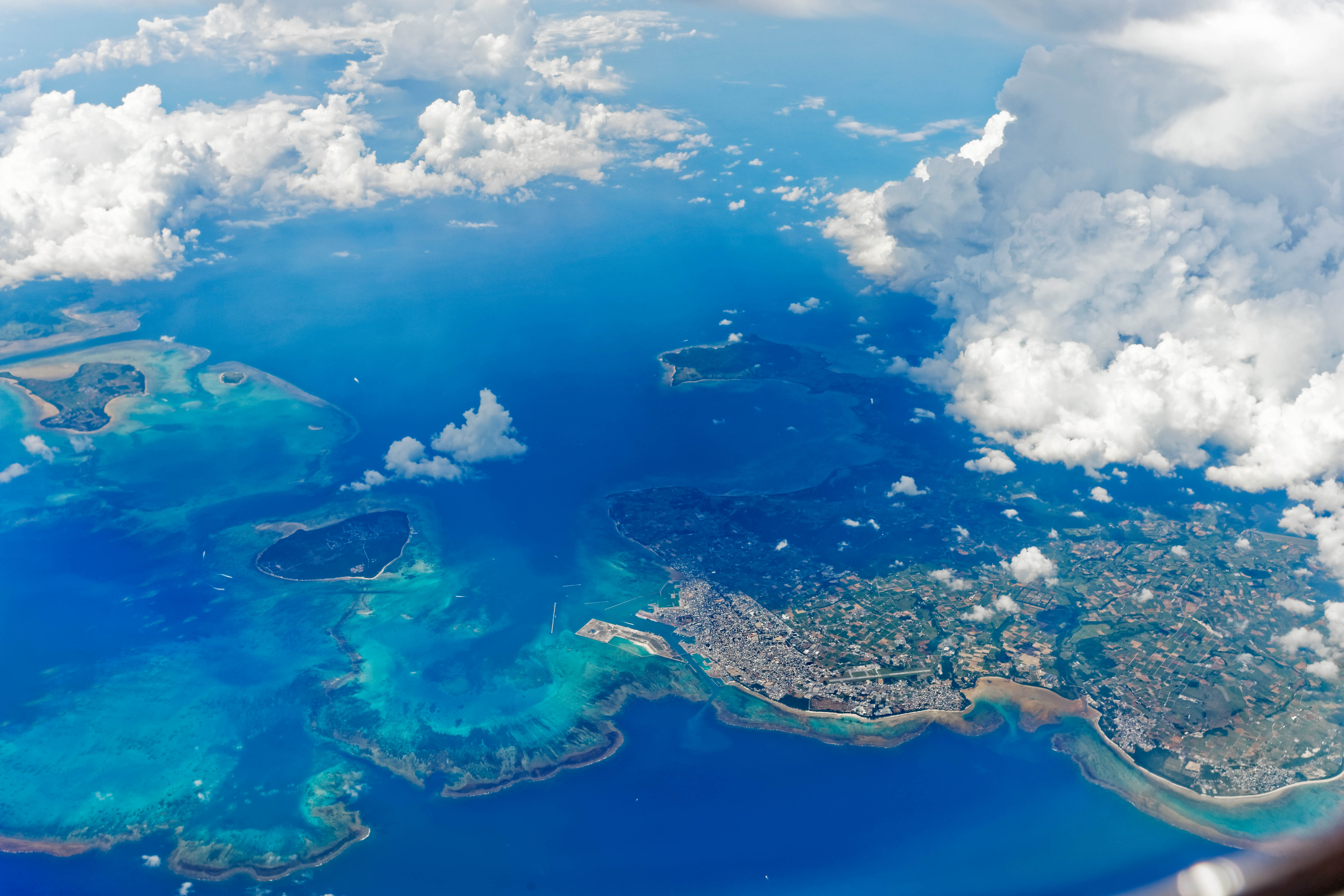
Aerial view of Ishigaki island, Taketomi and Kohama island, 2014

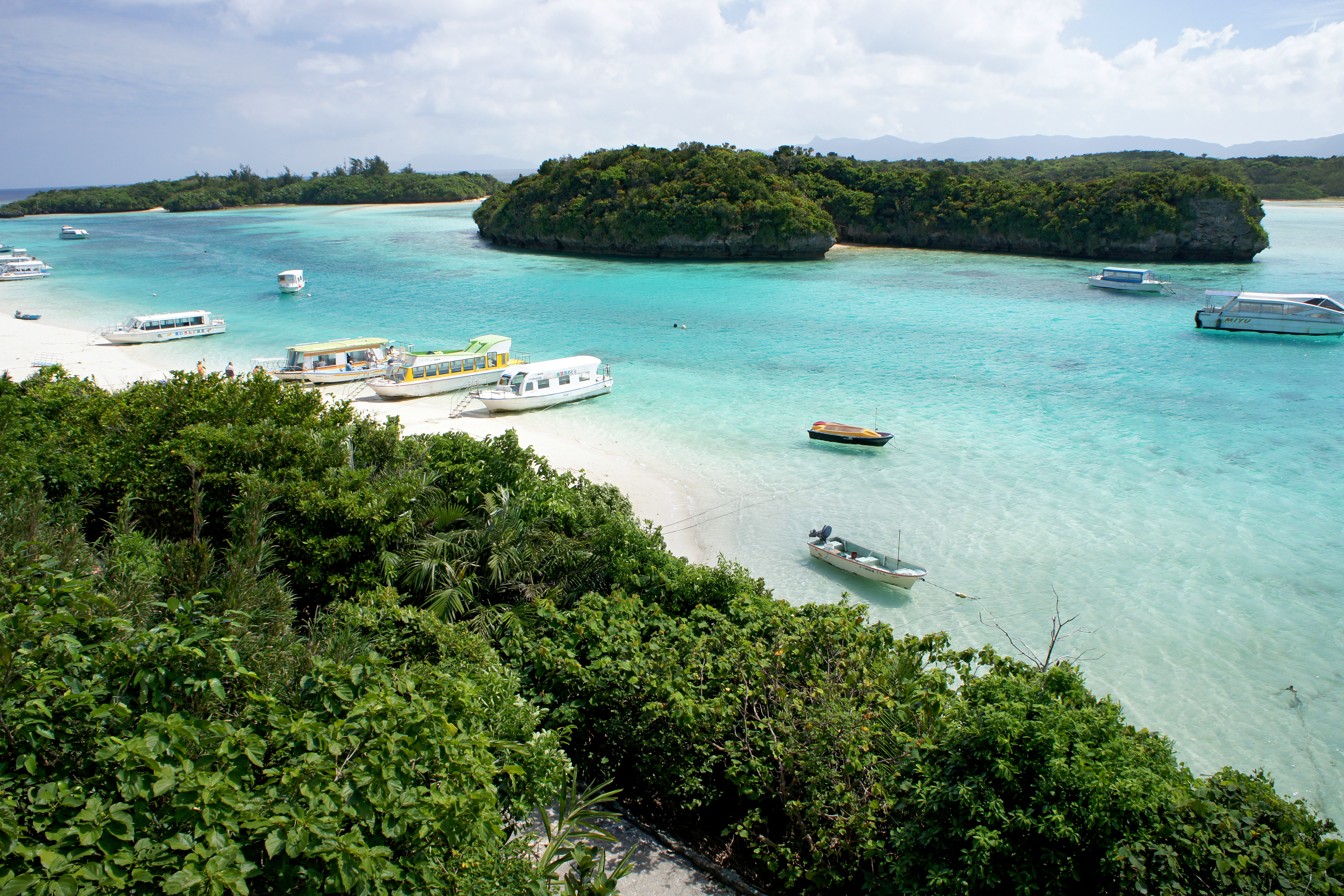
Kabira Bay

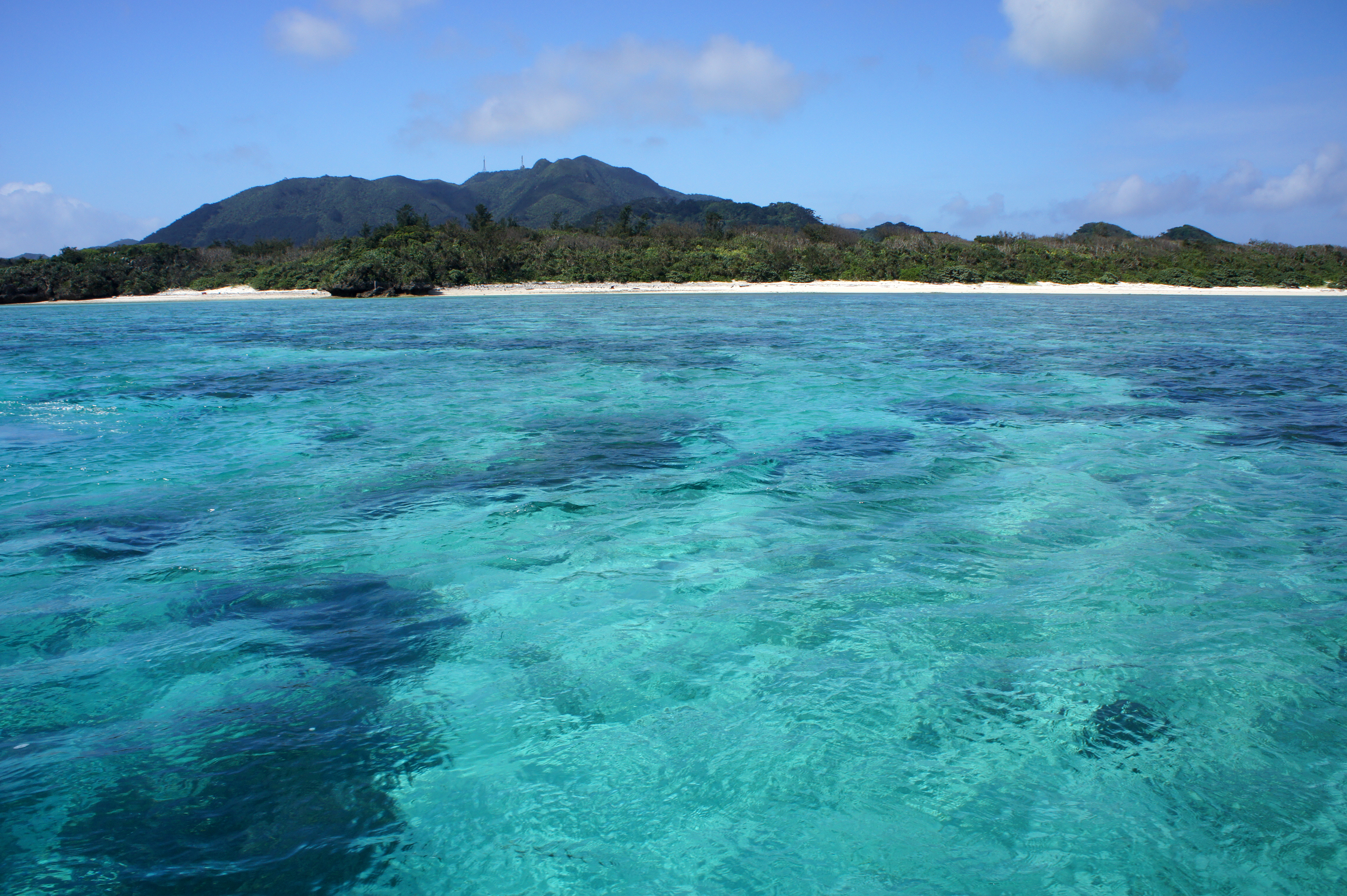
Kabira Bay

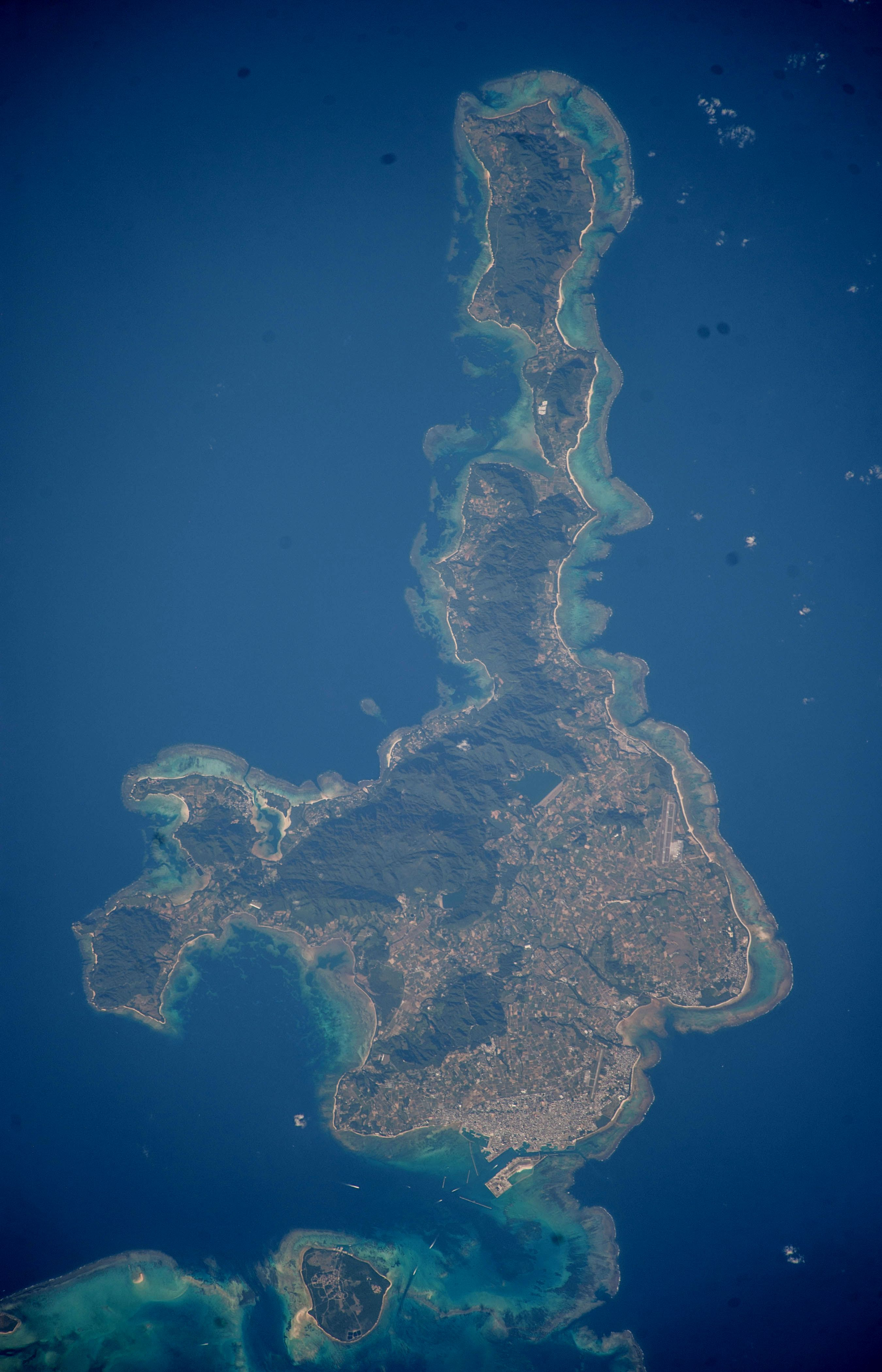
Ishigaki Island from space

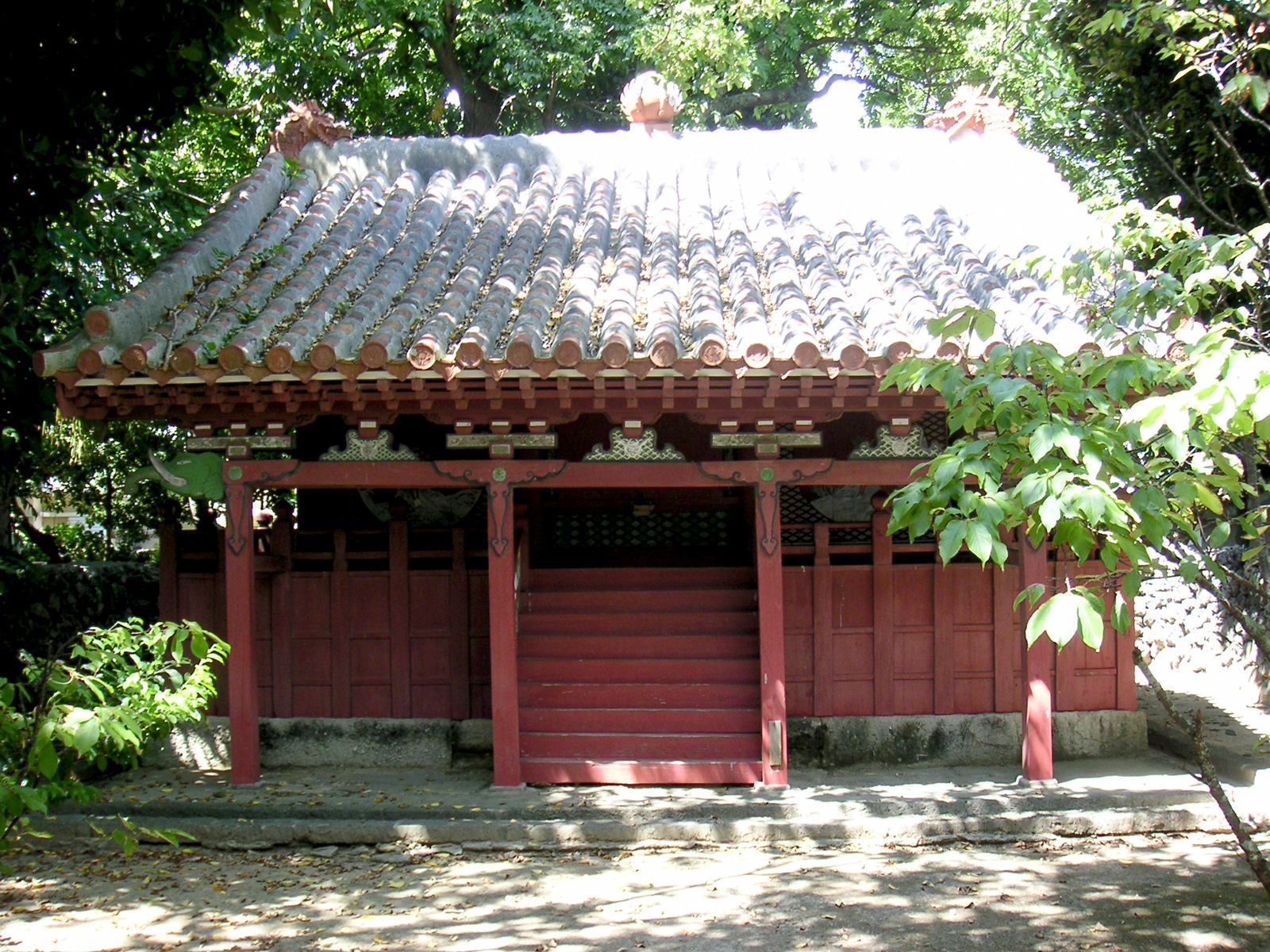
Torinji Gongendo, a Buddhist temple

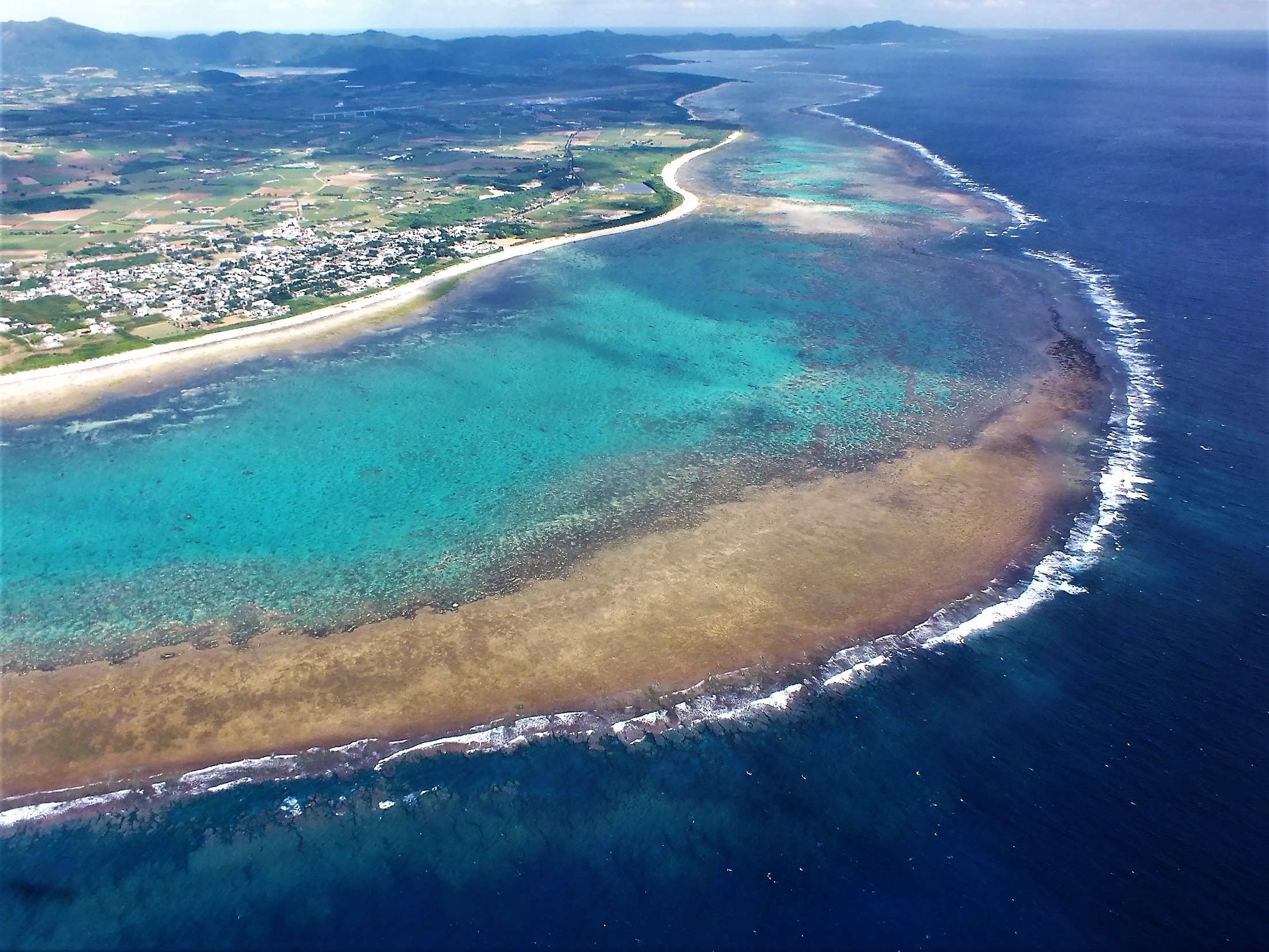
Shiraho coral reef

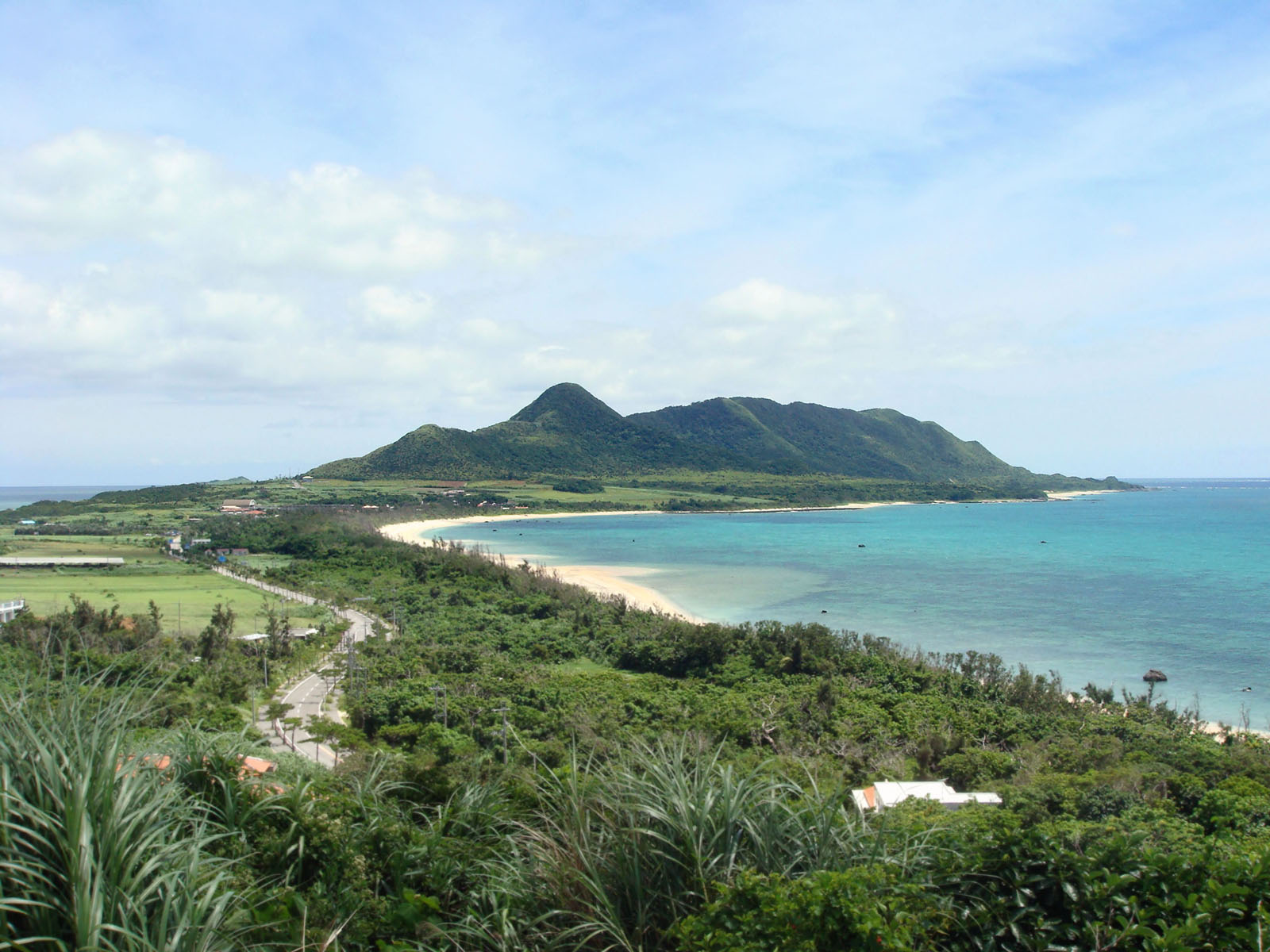
Hirakubo Peninsula

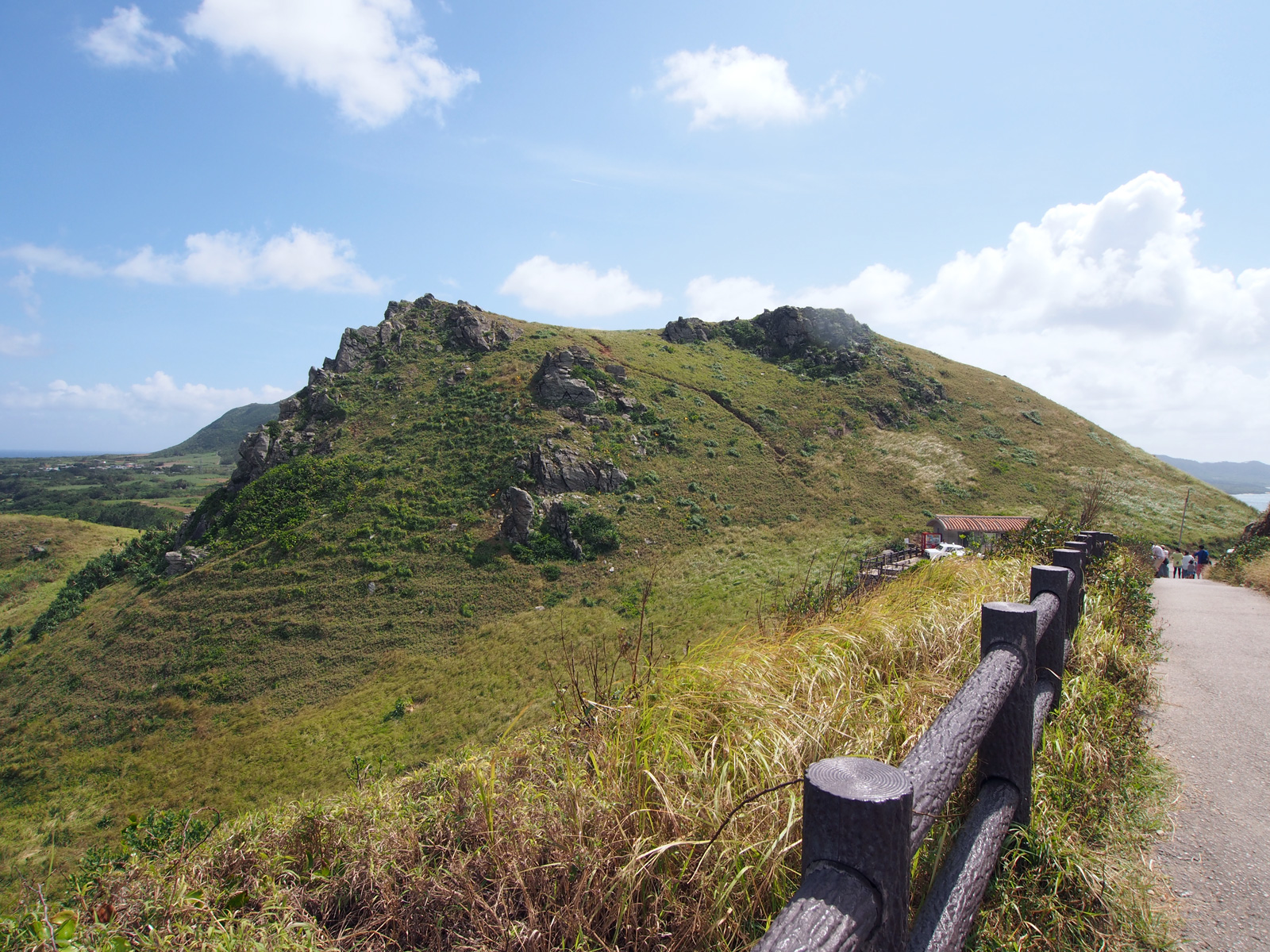
Hirakubo

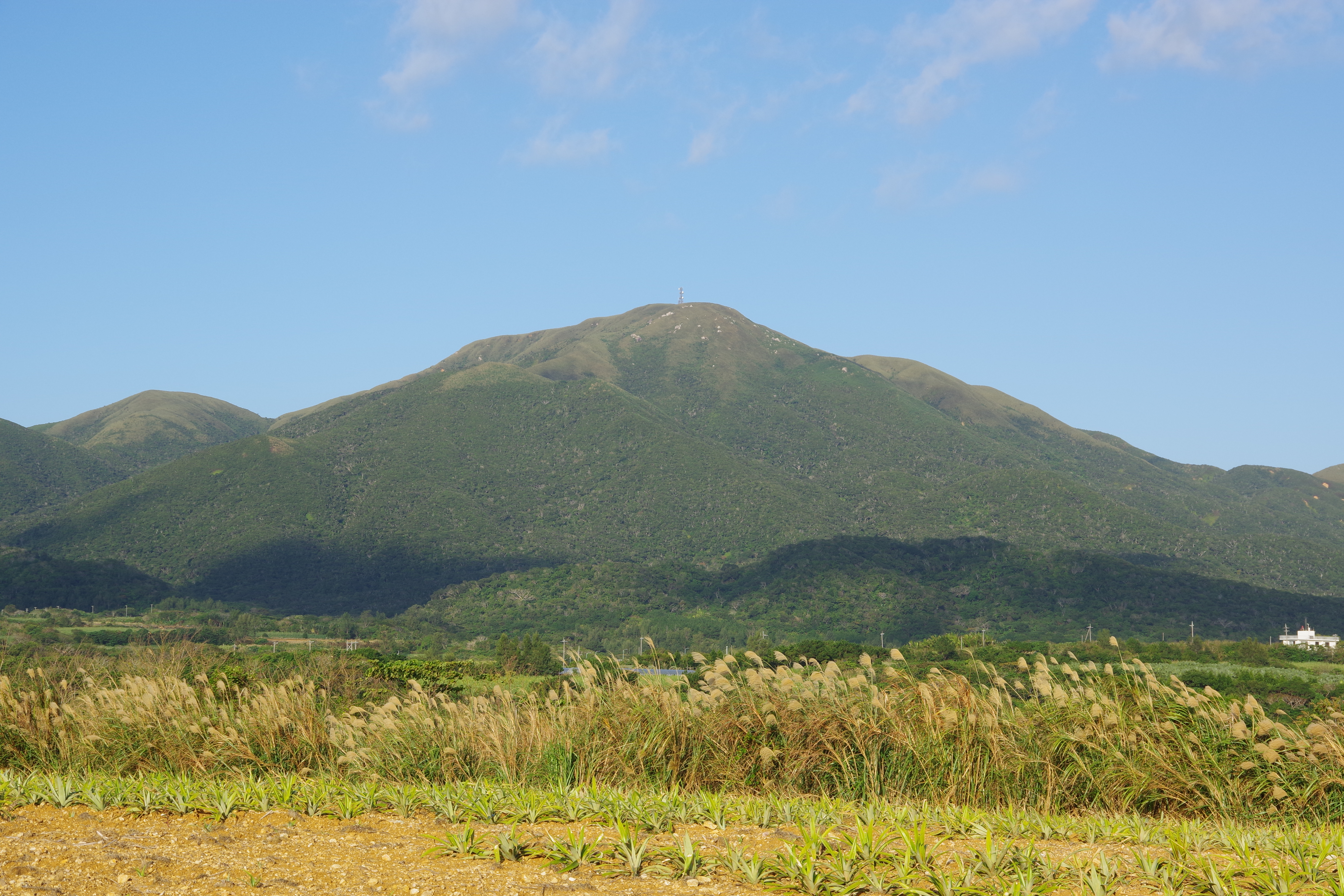
Mount Omoto

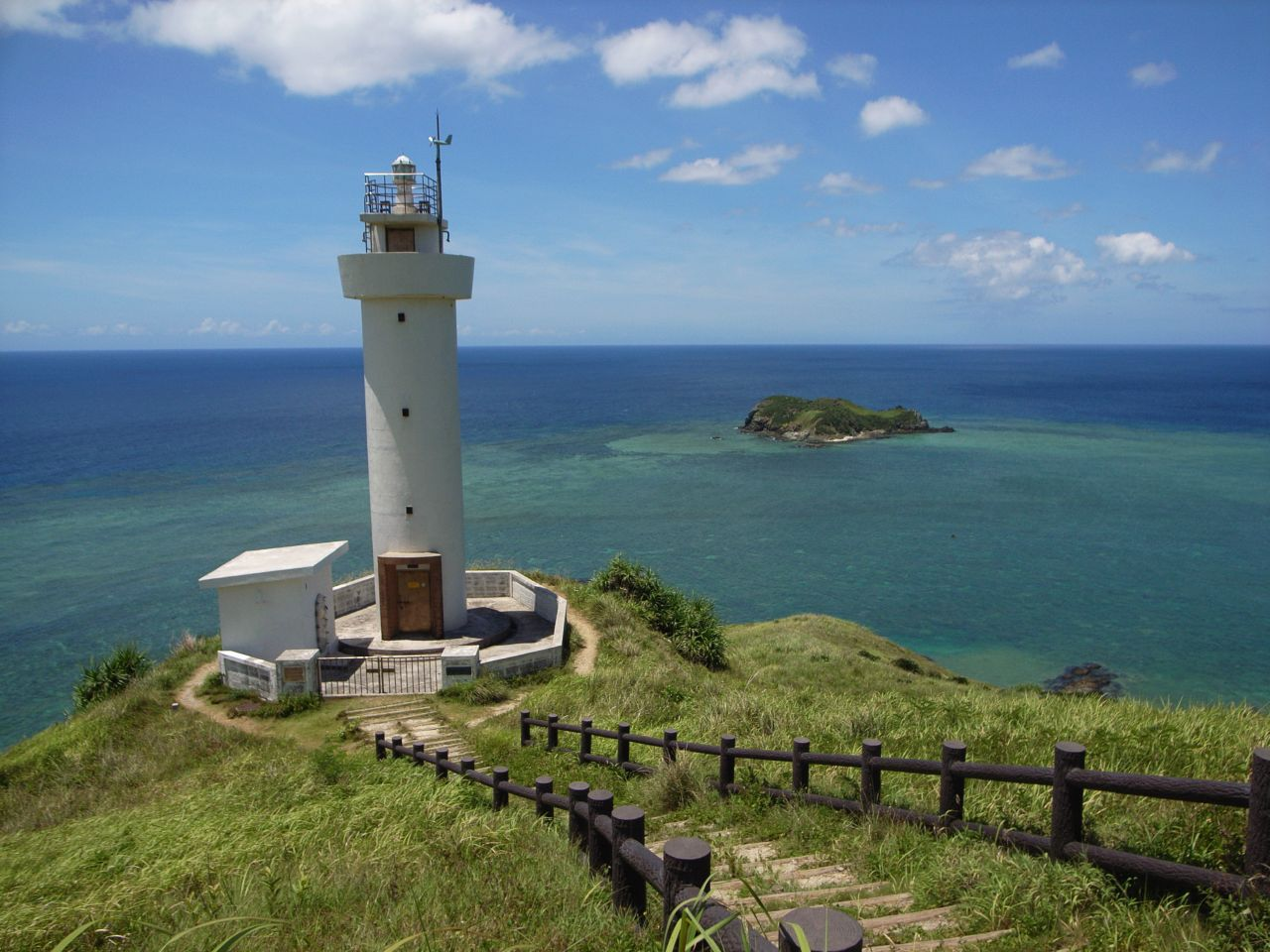
Hirakubosaki lighthouse

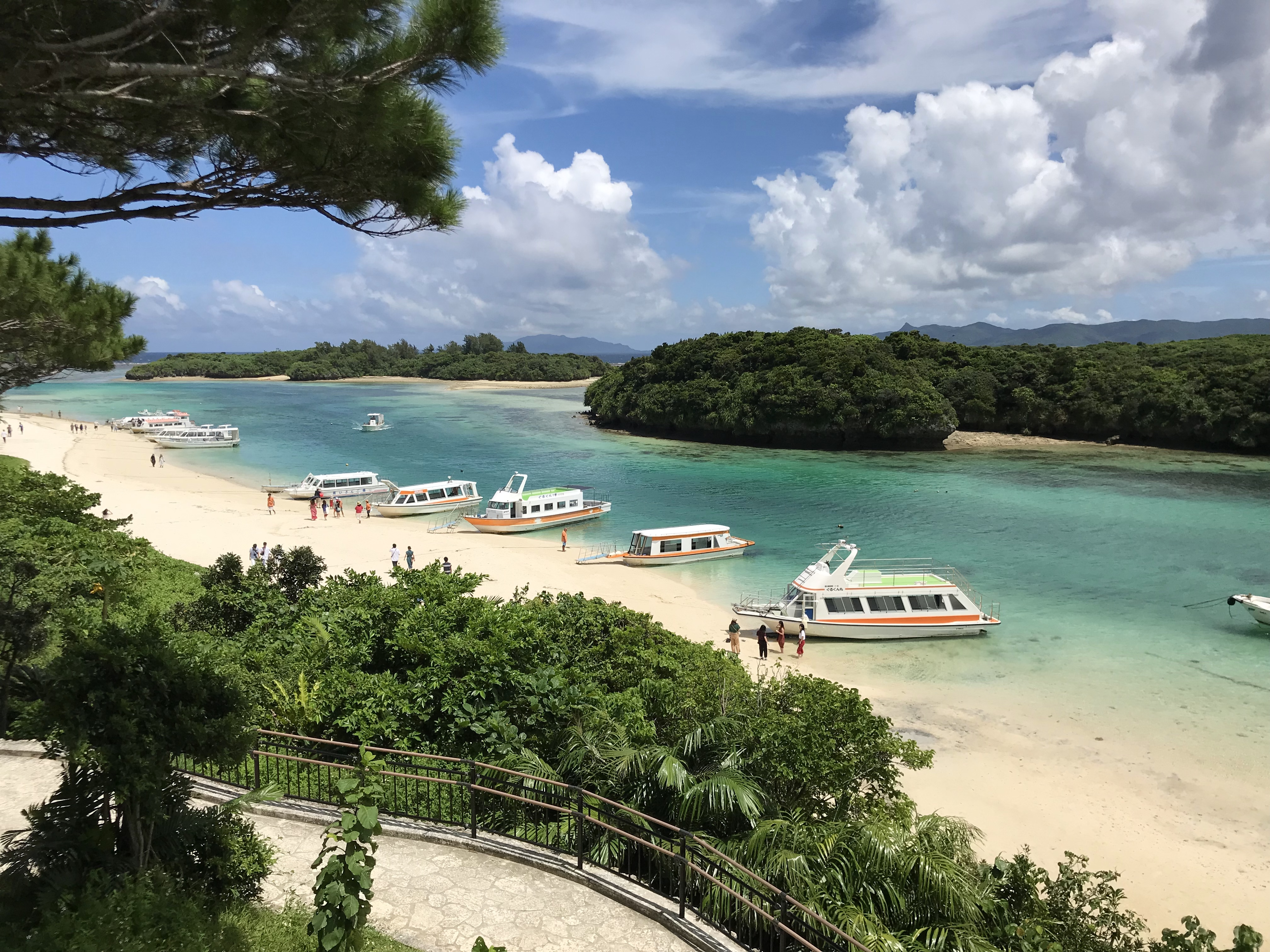
Kabira Bay

== See also ==
- Iriomote
- Taketomi
- Tourism in Japan
