= Mahatma Kabir =

Mahatma Kabir may refer to:

- Kabir (c. 1440–c. 1518), Indian poet and saint
- Mahatma Kabir (film), a 1947 Indian Kannada-language film
- Mahatma Kabir (1954 film), directed by Gajanan Jagirdar
- Mahathma Kabir, a 1962 Indian Kannada film

== See also ==
- Mahatma (disambiguation)
- Kabir (disambiguation)
