= Mount Omoto =

Mountain in Okinawa Prefecture, Japan

- 於茂登岳
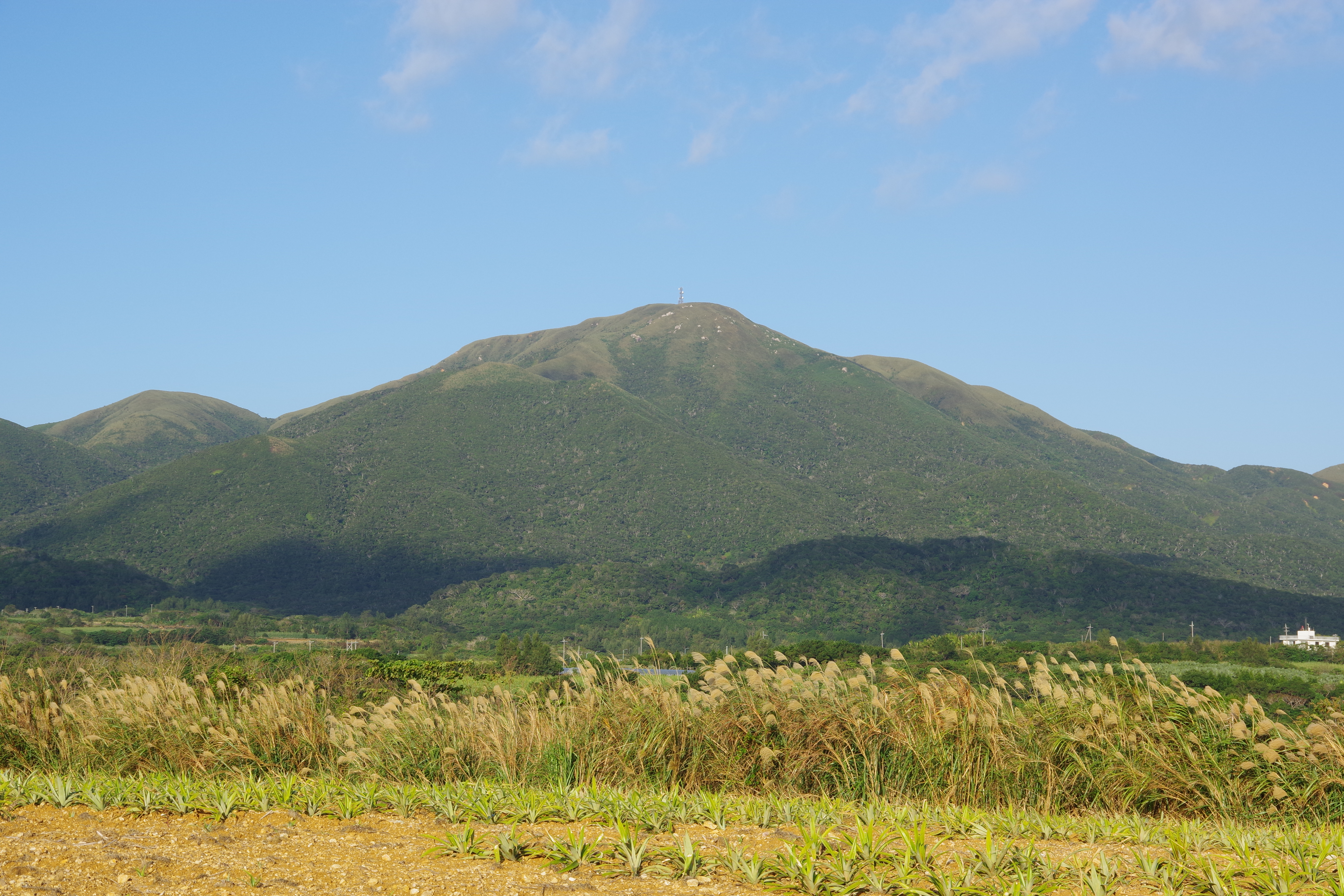
- Seen from the southeast

Highest point
- Elevation: 525.5 m (1,724 ft)
- Prominence: 525 m (1,722 ft)
- Coordinates: 24°25′38″N 124°11′00″E

Geography
- Location within Japan
- Location: Ishigaki, Okinawa Prefecture, Japan
- Parent range: Omoto Range

Mount Omoto (於茂登岳, Omoto-dake; Yaeyama: Umutu-daki) is a mountain located on Ishigaki Island in Okinawa, Japan. Together, with Kabira Bay, it is a nationally designated Place of Scenic Beauty.

== Overview ==
At 525.5 metres (1,724 ft) above sea level, Mount Omoto is the tallest mountain in Okinawa Prefecture. It is located on the island of Ishigaki, near the center of the Omoto Mountain Range, which runs east to west along the northern coast of the island.

Geologically, it is formed by granite from the Neogene Period. The Miyara River flowing from the northeast side and the Nagura River flowing from the south side of the mountain are vital sources of drinking and agricultural water on the island.

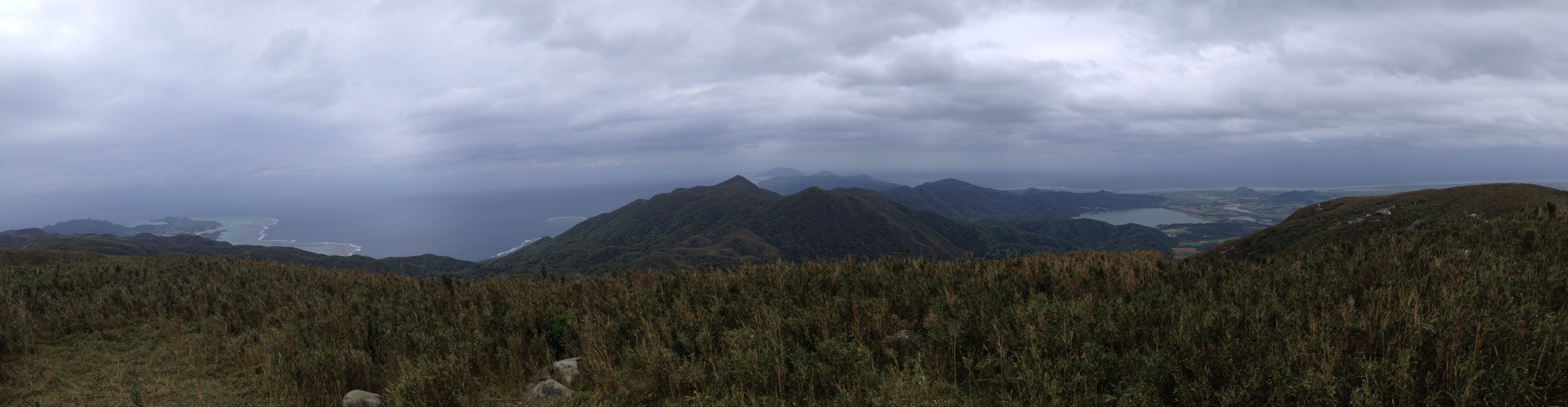
View from summit
