= Kabira Bay =

Bay of Ishigaki Island, Okinawa Prefecture

- 川平湾 (Japanese)
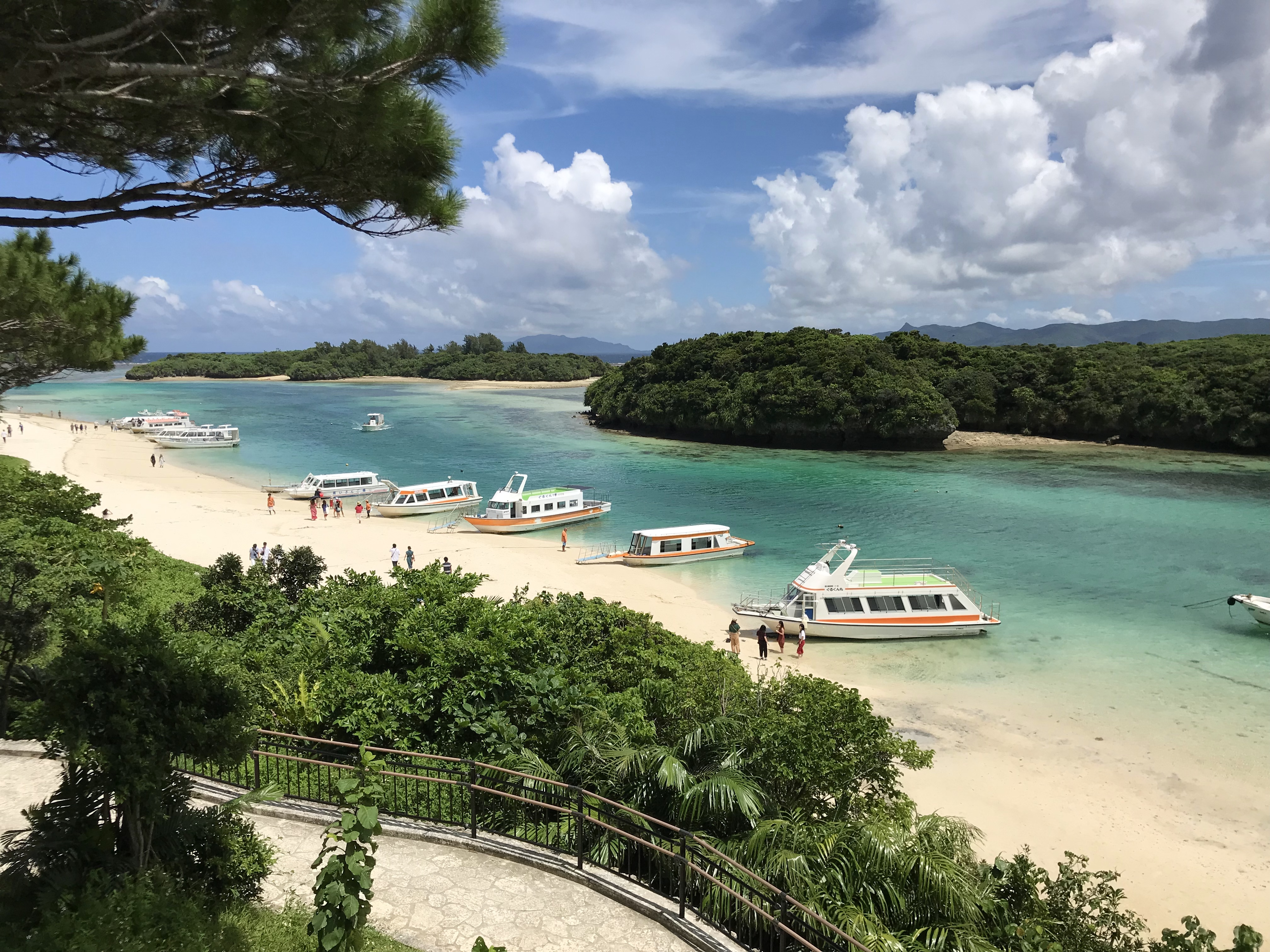

- Location within Okinawa Prefecture
- Coordinates: 24°26′46″N 124°8′25″E
- Basin countries: Japan
- Islands: Ishigaki
- Settlements: Ishigaki, Okinawa Prefecture

Kabira Bay (川平湾; Okinawan: Kabira wan) is located on the north coast of Ishigaki Island, Okinawa Prefecture, Japan. Renowned for its white sands, turquoise waters and dense vegetation, the bay forms part of the Iriomote-Ishigaki National Park. Alongside Mount Omoto, it has been designated a Place of Scenic Beauty. Black pearls are cultured in the bay.

Kabira Village is located near the bay. Its traditional culture was studied by American anthropologists in 1950–1952.

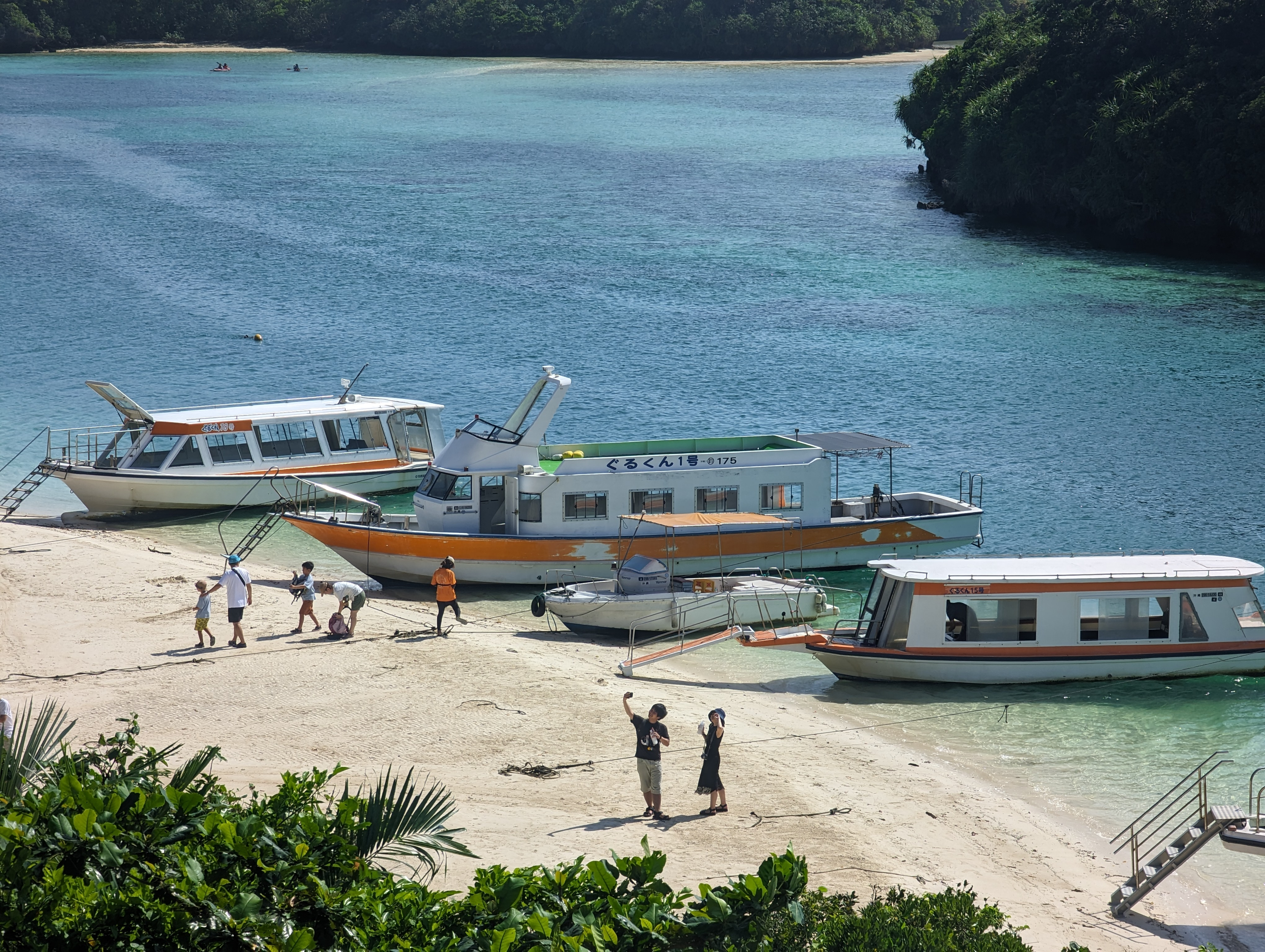
Tour boats in Kabira Bay in 2023

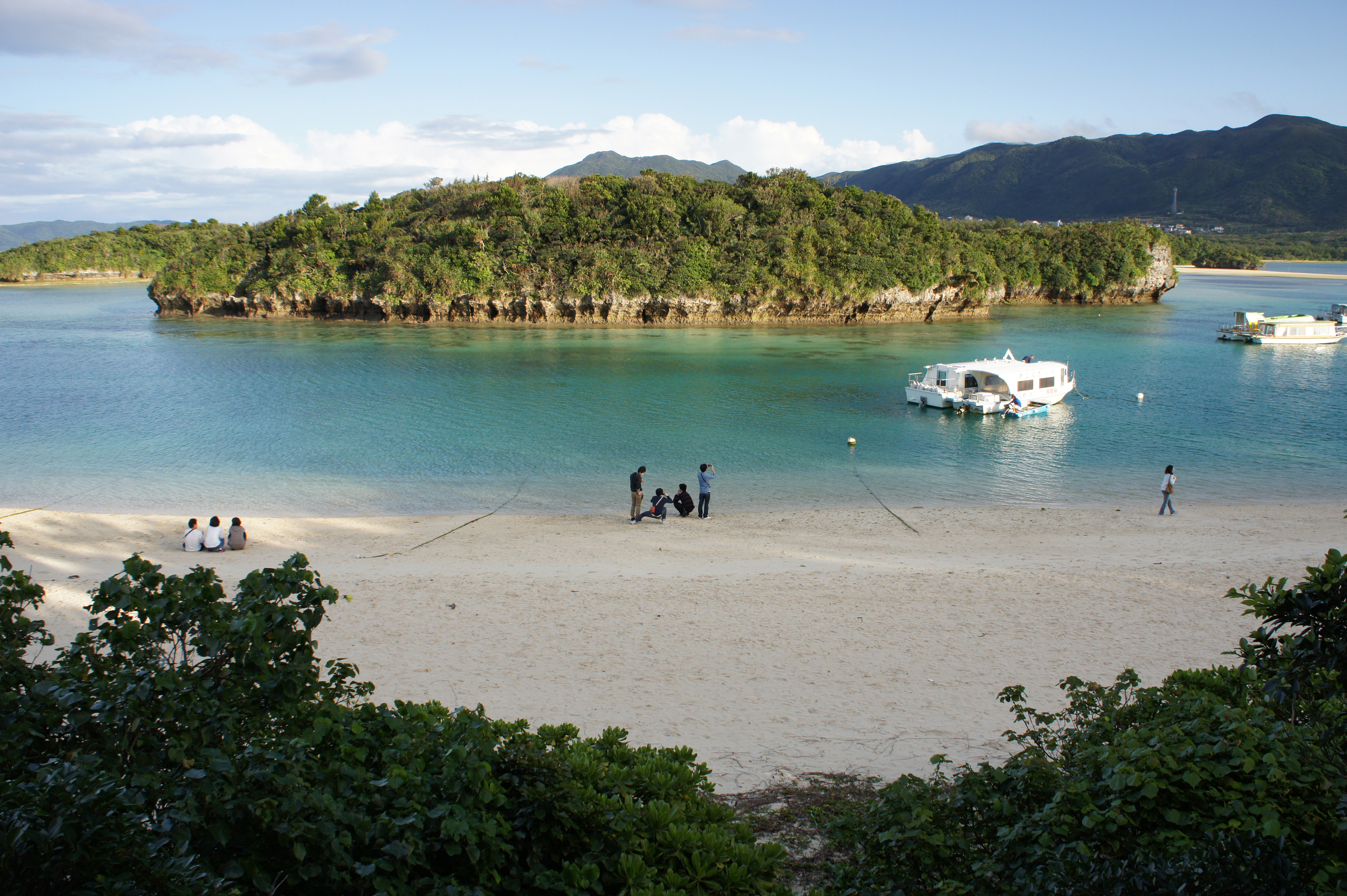
Looking towards Kabira Heart Island, 2011

Video of Kabira Bay in 2019

== See also ==
- Takuji Iwasaki
