= Kabiri =

Kabiri may refer to:

- Kabiri, Cabeiri, enigmatic chthonic deities of Greek mythology

== People ==
- Amir Gross Kabiri, Israeli businessman, art collector, owner of Hapoel Tel Aviv F.C
- Muhiddin Kabiri (born 1965), also known as Kabirov, Tajik politician, former member of the parliament of Tajikistan
- Rabi-ollah Kabiri (1889-1947), Iranian Azerbaijani general and politician and minister in Ja'far Pishevari's Cabinet in northern Iran
- Uri Kabiri (born 1970), Israeli songwriter, actor and musical producer

== Places ==
- Kabiri, Angola, a town and commune in the municipality of Ícolo e Bengo, Luanda Province, Angola
- Kabiri, Iran (disambiguation)

== See also ==
- Kabir (disambiguation)
