= Mahatma (disambiguation) =

Mahātmā is a Sanskrit epithet meaning "Great Soul" that is similar in usage to the Christian term saint.

Mahatma may also refer to:

- Mahathma, 1996 Malayalam film
- Mahatma (2000 film), 2000 Kannada film
- Mahatma (film), 2009 Telugu film
- Mahatma Ayyankali, a 2013 Malayalam film
- Mahatma Lalon Fakir (1774–1890), Bengali Baul saint, mystic, songwriter, social reformer and secular thinker
- Mahatma Gandhi (1869-1948), the preeminent leader of Indian nationalism in British-ruled India
- Mahatma Hansraj (1864–1938), Indian educationist and Swami Dayanand follower
- Mahatma (magazine), magic magazine founded in 1895 by George Little
- Mahatma Otoo (born 1992), Ghanaian footballer
- "Mahatma", a song by Barrage on Barrage
- Mahatma, a brand of rice sold by Riviana Foods, a subsidiary of Ebro Foods
- "The Mahatma" or "the Mahātmā", a nickname for American baseball player and executive Branch Rickey

== See also ==
- Mahatma Gandhi (disambiguation)
- Mahatma Kabir (disambiguation)
- Aaj Ka Mahaatma (lit. 'Today's Mahatma'), a 1976 Indian film
