= Humayun Kabir =

Humayun Kabir may refer to:

== Politicians ==
- Humayun Kabir (Indian National Congress politician) (1906–1969), Indian National Congress politician
- Humayun Kabir (Bangladeshi politician) (1952–2019), Bangladeshi lawyer and Jatiya Party politician
- Humayun Kabir (AJUP politician) (born 1963), Aam Janata Unnayan Party politician
- Humayun Kabir (politician, former police officer) (born 1961), TMC politician and former IPS officer
- Humayun Kabir (BNP politician), Bangladesh’ Minister of State for Foreign Affairs

== Writers, poets, and journalists ==
- Humayun Kabir Balu (1947–2004), Bangladeshi journalist
- Humayun Kabir (poet) (1948–1972), Bengali communist and poet
- Humayun Kabir Dhali, Bangladeshi journalist and author

== Government and military ==
- M. Humayun Kabir (born 1952), Bangladeshi diplomat
- Md Humayun Kabir Khandaker, Bangladeshi civil servant
- Mohammad Humayun Kabir (born 1965), Bangladesh Army officer

== Arts and entertainment ==
- Humayun Kabir Sadhu (1982–2019), Bangladeshi actor

== Other ==
- Syed Humayun Kabir (died 2015), Bangladeshi philanthropist

== See also ==
- Bamanpukur Humayun Kabir Mahavidyalaya, college in West Bengal, India
- Humayun (name)
- Kabir (disambiguation)
