= Iriomote-Ishigaki National Park =

National park of Okinawa, Japan

- 西表石垣国立公園
- IUCN category II (national park)
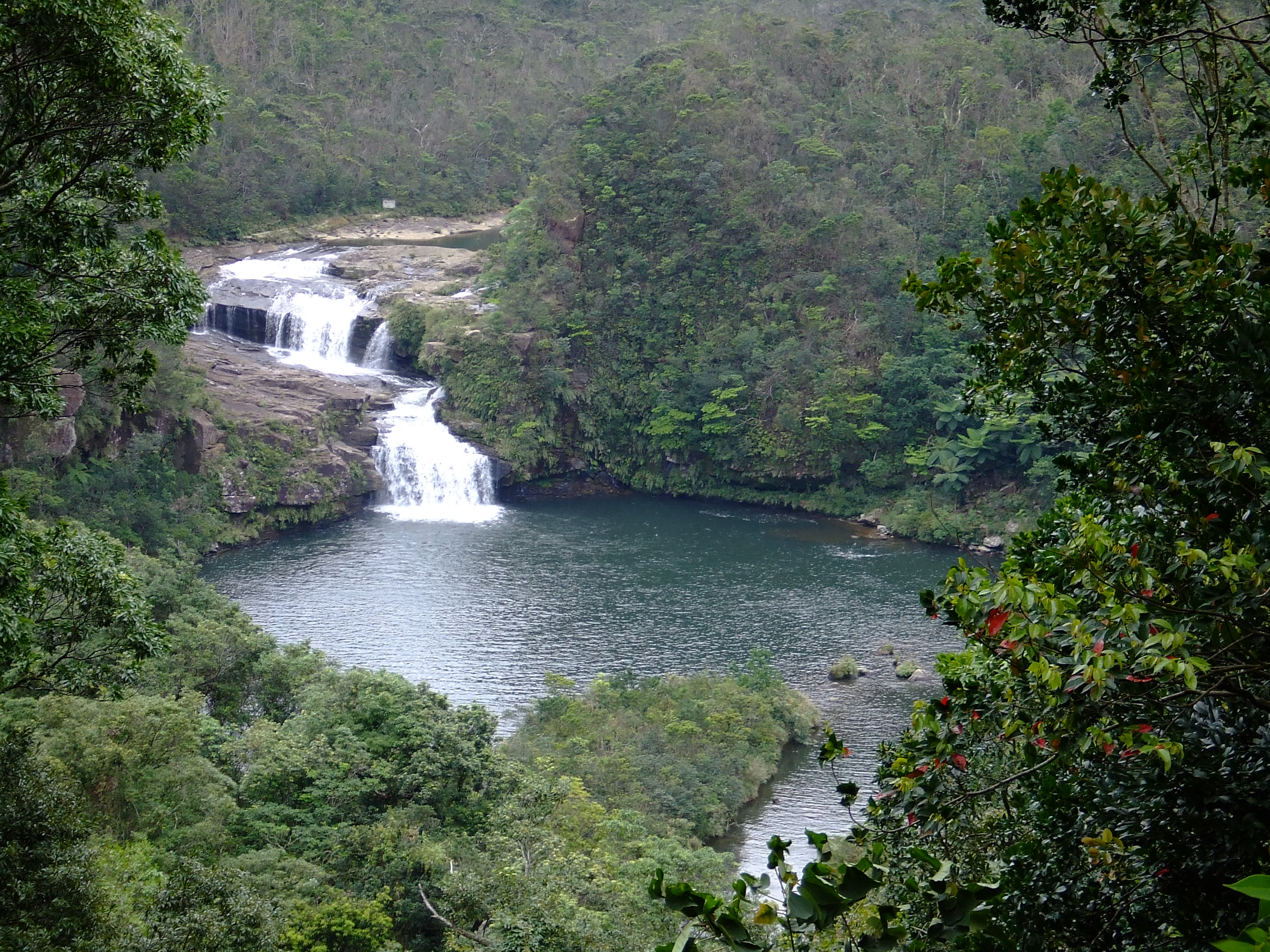
- Mariyudu Falls in Iriomote Island

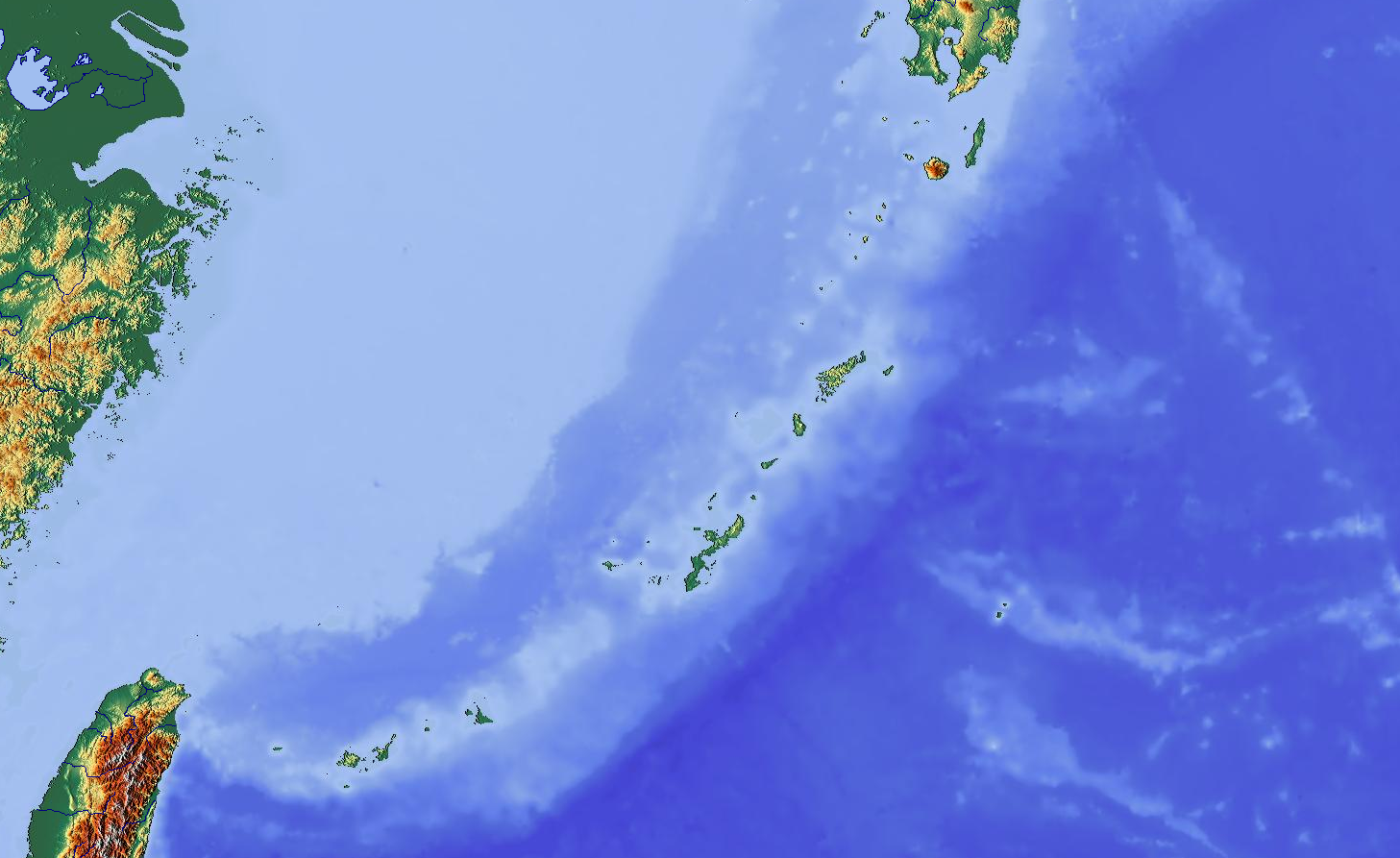
- Location within Ryukyu Islands Location within Japan
- Location: Yaeyama Islands, Okinawa, Japan
- Coordinates: 24°19′N 123°53′E
- Area: 1,221.5 km^{2} (471.6 sq mi)
- Established: 15 May 1972

Iriomote-Ishigaki National Park (西表石垣国立公園, Iriomote-Ishigaki Kokuritsu Kōen) is a national park in Okinawa Prefecture, Japan. It is located on and around the Yaeyama Islands of the East China Sea.

The park was established in 1972 as Iriomote National Park (西表国立公園) and included the islands of Iriomote, Kohama, Kuro, and Taketomi. In August 2007 the protected area was extended to include Ishigaki Island.

The park is famous as the habitat of the Iriomote wild cat.

== Related municipalities ==
- Ishigaki, Taketomi

== See also ==
- List of national parks of Japan
- Okinawa Kaigan Quasi-National Park
