= Ishigaki, Okinawa =

City in Okinawa Prefecture, Japan

Ishigaki 石垣市 Isïgaksï, Ishanagzï
- City
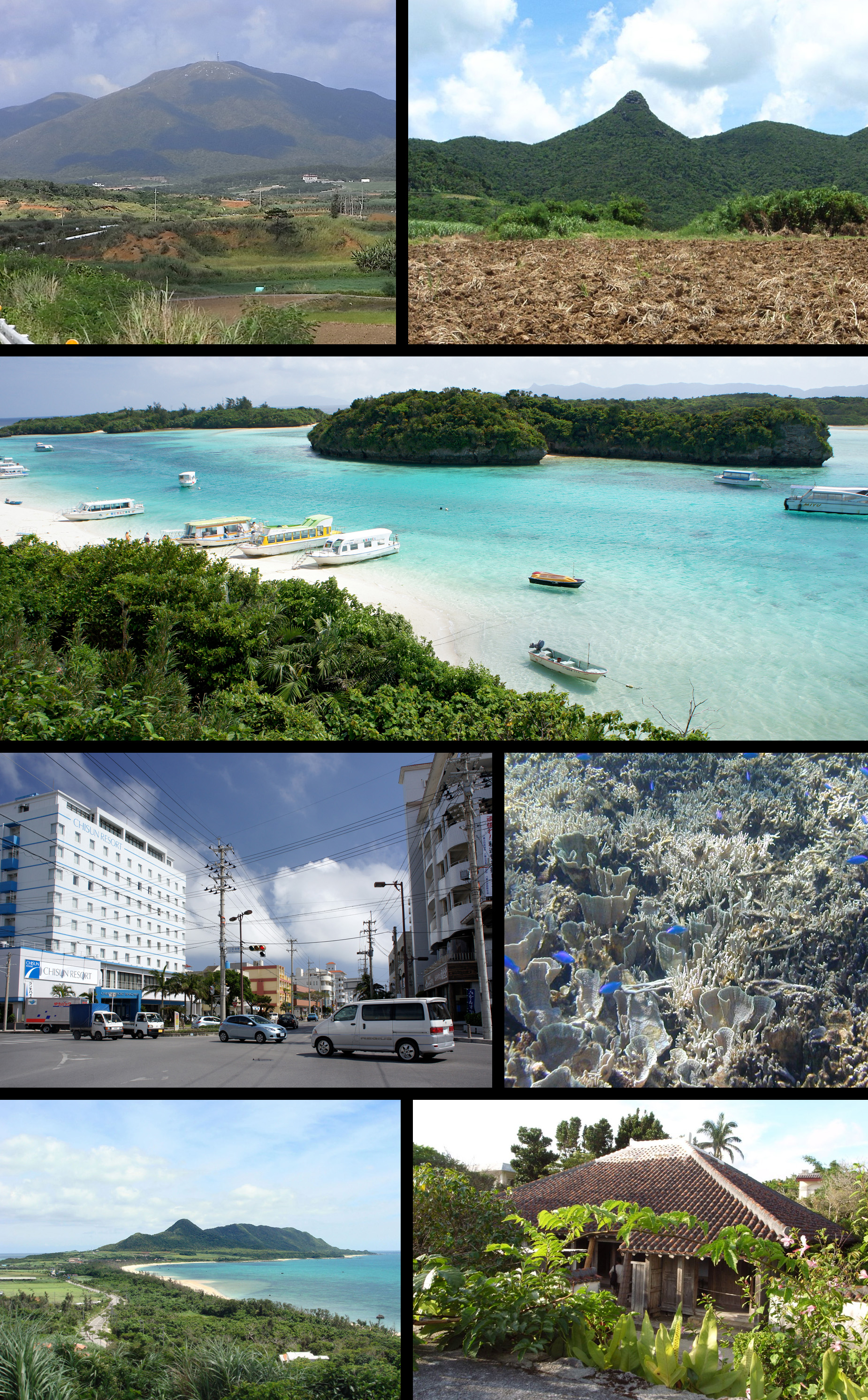
- Top left: Mount Omoto, Top right: Mount Nosoko, 2nd row: Kabira Bay from Kabira Park, lower left: 730 Street in downtown Ishigaki, lower right: Shiraho natural reef, Bottom of left: Hirakubo peninsula from Tamatorizaki, Bottom right: Miyara old residence site

- Flag Seal

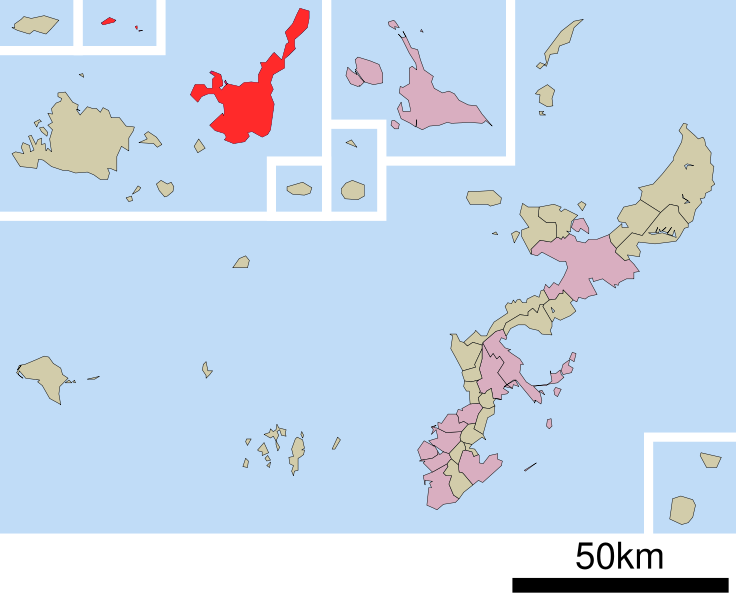
- Location of Ishigaki in Okinawa Prefecture
- Interactive map of Ishigaki
- Location within Japan
- Coordinates: 24°20′26″N 124°9′20″E
- Country: Japan
- Region: Kyushu
- Prefecture: Okinawa Prefecture

Government
  - Mayor: (In vacancy)

Area
  - Total: 229.00 km^{2} (88.42 sq mi)

Population (October 1, 2016)
  - Total: 47,562
  - Density: 213/km^{2} (550/sq mi)
- Time zone: UTC+9 (Japan Standard Time)
  - Tree: Yaeyama kokutan (Diospyros ferrea)
  - Flower: Sakishima tsutsuji (Rhododendron amanoi, Ohwi)
  - Bird: Crested serpent eagle
  - Butterfly: Rice paper butterfly
  - Fish: Hamafuefuki (Lethrinus nebulosus)
  - Shell: Black-lip oyster (Pinctada margaritifera)
- Phone number: 0980-82-9911
- Address: 14 Misakichō, Ishigaki-shi 907-8501
- Climate: Af
- Website: www.city.ishigaki.okinawa.jp

Ishigaki (石垣市, Ishigaki-shi; Japanese pronunciation: [ì.ɕí.ɡä́.k̟ʲí, -k̟ʲi̥.ɕì, -ŋä́-] Yaeyama: Isïgaksï, Ishanagzï) is a city in Okinawa Prefecture, Japan. It includes Ishigaki island and the Senkaku Islands territory. The city is the political, cultural, and economic center of the Yaeyama Islands. New Ishigaki Airport serves the city. As of December 2012, the city has an estimated population of 48,816 and a population density of 213 persons per km^{2}. The total area is 229.00 km^{2}.

It is also the seat of the Senkaku Islands administration, those islands being part of the territory of the city.

== History ==
One of the first Frenchmen ever to visit Japan, Guillaume Courtet, came ashore at Ishigaki in 1636.

The current city of Ishigaki was founded in 1908 as Yaeyama Village, an amalgamation of the Ishigaki, Ōhama, and Miyara magiri. In 1914 it was renamed to Ishigaki Village, and grew to become Ishigaki Town in 1926. Ishigaki was elevated to city status on July 10, 1947.

== Geography ==
The city of Ishigaki covers the entirety of Ishigaki Island (222 km^{2} (86 mi^{2})). The island is surrounded by coral reefs. The highest point on Ishigaki Island is Omotodake (525.5 m (1,724 ft)).

The uninhabited Senkaku Islands are located 150 km (93 mi) north of the Ishigaki Island. The Senkaku Islands cover roughly 6.3 km^{2} (2.4 mi^{2}).

=== Administrative divisions ===
The city is divided in twenty-four wards.

- Arakawa (新川)
- Fukai (桴海)
- Hamasakichō (浜崎町)
- Hirae (平得)
- Hirakubo (平久保)
- Ibaruma (伊原間)
- Ishigaki (石垣)
- Kabira (川平)
- Maezato (真栄里)
- Misakichō (美崎町)
- Miyara (宮良)
- Moriyama (盛山)
- Nagura (名蔵)
- Nosoko (野底)
- Ōhama (大浜)
- Ōkawa (大川)
- Painuhamachō (南ぬ浜町)
- Sakieda (崎枝)
- Shin'eichō (新栄町)
- Shiraho (白保)
- Tonoshiro (登野城)
- Tonoshirosenkaku (登野城尖閣)
- Tōzato (桃里)
- Yashimachō (八島町)

== Economy ==
Ishigaki produces sugarcane and pineapples. Tourism is also an important part of the economy of the city.

== Transportation ==
New Ishigaki Airport and Ishigaki Port serve the city.

== Climate ==
Ishigaki has a tropical rainforest climate (Köppen climate classification Af) with frequent tropical cyclones so not equatorial. "Summers" are very hot and "winters" are warm. Precipitation is abundant throughout the year; the rainiest months are August and September (due to tropical storms/typhoons) while the driest months are in late winter.

Climate data for Ishigaki (1991–2020 normals, extremes 1896–present)
| Month | Jan | Feb | Mar | Apr | May | Jun | Jul | Aug | Sep | Oct | Nov | Dec | Year |
|---|---|---|---|---|---|---|---|---|---|---|---|---|---|
| Record high °C (°F) | 27.7 (81.9) | 28.0 (82.4) | 29.4 (84.9) | 31.4 (88.5) | 33.3 (91.9) | 34.6 (94.3) | 35.5 (95.9) | 35.6 (96.1) | 35.2 (95.4) | 33.8 (92.8) | 30.8 (87.4) | 28.8 (83.8) | 35.6 (96.1) |
| Mean maximum °C (°F) | 25.6 (78.1) | 26.3 (79.3) | 27.3 (81.1) | 29.1 (84.4) | 31.2 (88.2) | 32.9 (91.2) | 33.9 (93.0) | 33.8 (92.8) | 32.9 (91.2) | 31.4 (88.5) | 29.2 (84.6) | 27.1 (80.8) | 34.2 (93.6) |
| Mean daily maximum °C (°F) | 21.5 (70.7) | 22.0 (71.6) | 23.7 (74.7) | 26.0 (78.8) | 28.7 (83.7) | 30.9 (87.6) | 32.2 (90.0) | 32.0 (89.6) | 31.0 (87.8) | 28.8 (83.8) | 26.2 (79.2) | 23.0 (73.4) | 27.2 (81.0) |
| Daily mean °C (°F) | 18.9 (66.0) | 19.4 (66.9) | 20.9 (69.6) | 23.4 (74.1) | 25.9 (78.6) | 28.4 (83.1) | 29.6 (85.3) | 29.4 (84.9) | 28.2 (82.8) | 26.0 (78.8) | 23.6 (74.5) | 20.5 (68.9) | 24.5 (76.1) |
| Mean daily minimum °C (°F) | 16.7 (62.1) | 17.2 (63.0) | 18.6 (65.5) | 21.3 (70.3) | 23.9 (75.0) | 26.6 (79.9) | 27.7 (81.9) | 27.3 (81.1) | 26.0 (78.8) | 23.9 (75.0) | 21.5 (70.7) | 18.4 (65.1) | 22.4 (72.3) |
| Mean minimum °C (°F) | 12.0 (53.6) | 12.8 (55.0) | 13.6 (56.5) | 16.3 (61.3) | 20.1 (68.2) | 22.8 (73.0) | 25.1 (77.2) | 25.0 (77.0) | 23.5 (74.3) | 21.1 (70.0) | 17.5 (63.5) | 13.6 (56.5) | 11.3 (52.3) |
| Record low °C (°F) | 6.5 (43.7) | 7.1 (44.8) | 7.4 (45.3) | 10.0 (50.0) | 14.9 (58.8) | 17.5 (63.5) | 20.9 (69.6) | 17.4 (63.3) | 17.9 (64.2) | 14.1 (57.4) | 12.1 (53.8) | 9.7 (49.5) | 6.5 (43.7) |
| Average precipitation mm (inches) | 135.0 (5.31) | 124.0 (4.88) | 134.4 (5.29) | 146.9 (5.78) | 190.7 (7.51) | 208.2 (8.20) | 142.3 (5.60) | 249.8 (9.83) | 259.7 (10.22) | 211.2 (8.31) | 138.1 (5.44) | 155.2 (6.11) | 2,095.5 (82.50) |
| Average precipitation days (≥ 0.5 mm) | 14.9 | 11.7 | 11.7 | 10.3 | 11.1 | 10.0 | 10.4 | 13.3 | 13.1 | 12.3 | 12.8 | 14.8 | 146.3 |
| Average relative humidity (%) | 72 | 73 | 74 | 77 | 79 | 81 | 77 | 78 | 76 | 73 | 73 | 71 | 75 |
| Mean monthly sunshine hours | 84.7 | 91.3 | 118.1 | 130.3 | 164.3 | 212.9 | 261.0 | 232.9 | 189.9 | 157.6 | 115.3 | 89.3 | 1,852.5 |
Source: Japan Meteorological Agency

== Main sights ==
Sights in the town of Ishigaki include:

- Gongen Do is a Shinto shrine close to the center of Ishigaki town which was founded in 1614. The shrine was destroyed during a flood in 1771. The present buildings date from 1787. The neighbouring building is Torin Ji, a Buddhist temple which was founded in 1614 as well. It houses several statues dating from 1737 which possibly represent tutelary gods of Ishigaki Island.
- Close by is Miyaradunchi, a residential building dating from 1819. Its architecture with a hip roof consisting of red tiles is similar to samurai houses on mainland Japan, but there have never been samurai on the Yaeyama Islands.
- The Museum of the Yaeyama Islands, Shiritsu Yaeyama Hakubutsukan, is on Main Street in the center of Ishigaki town. Various kinds of boats and other items referring to the history and culture of the Yaeyama Islands can be seen. It is famous for being the southernmost museum of Japan.
- Fuzaki Kannon Do is a small Shinto shrine dating from 1742. It is 5 km (3.1 mi) west of the town on a hill offering a scenic view of Ishigaki and Iriomote, the neighbouring island. The shrine is dedicated to Kannon.
- Tojinbaka is tomb in a typical Chinese style about 6 km (3.7 mi) west the town on the ring road. 400 Chinese labourers who died during a rebellion on a ship sailing to America in 1852 are buried here.
- Kabira Bay

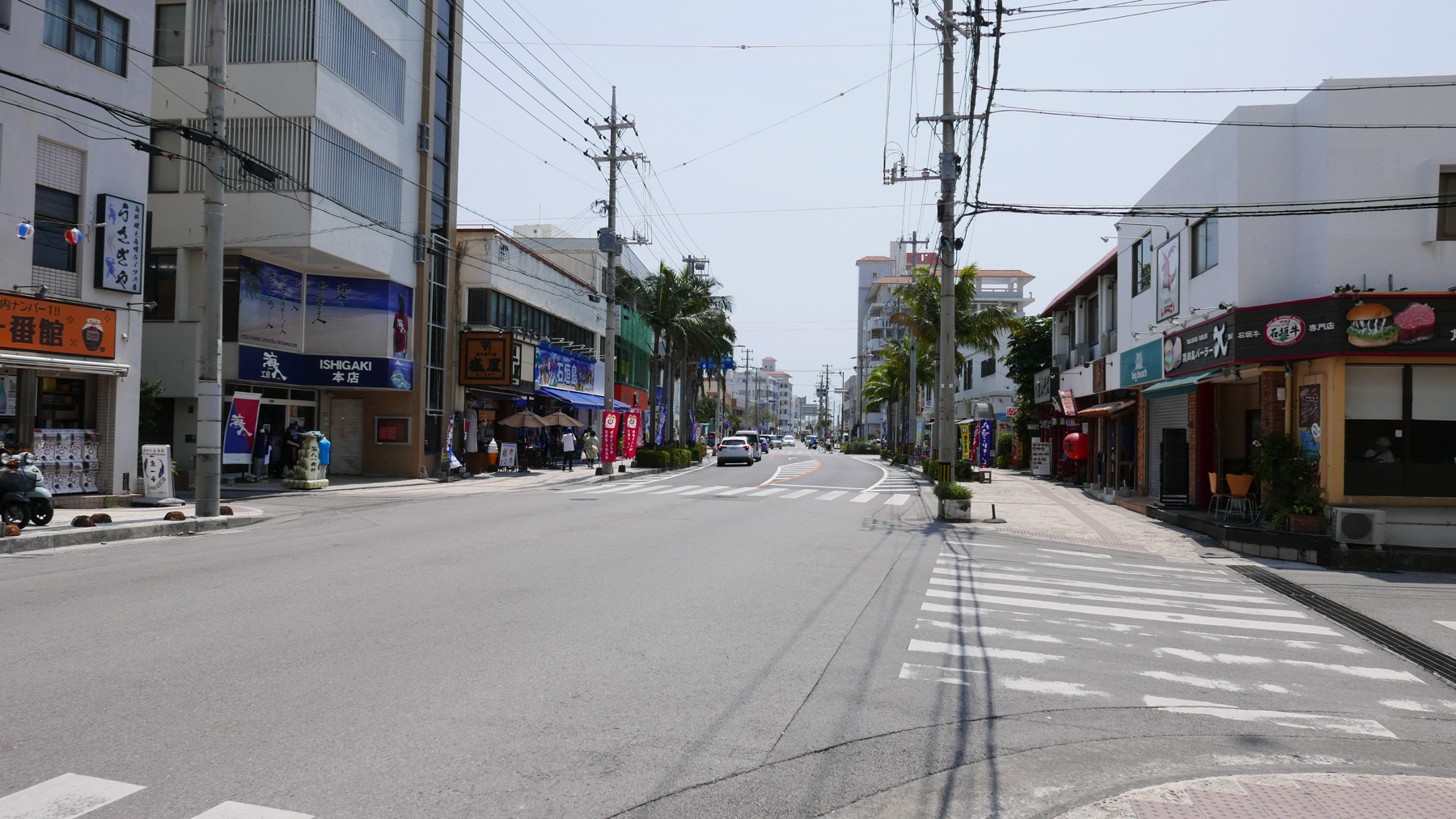
Shinyakusho-Dori.

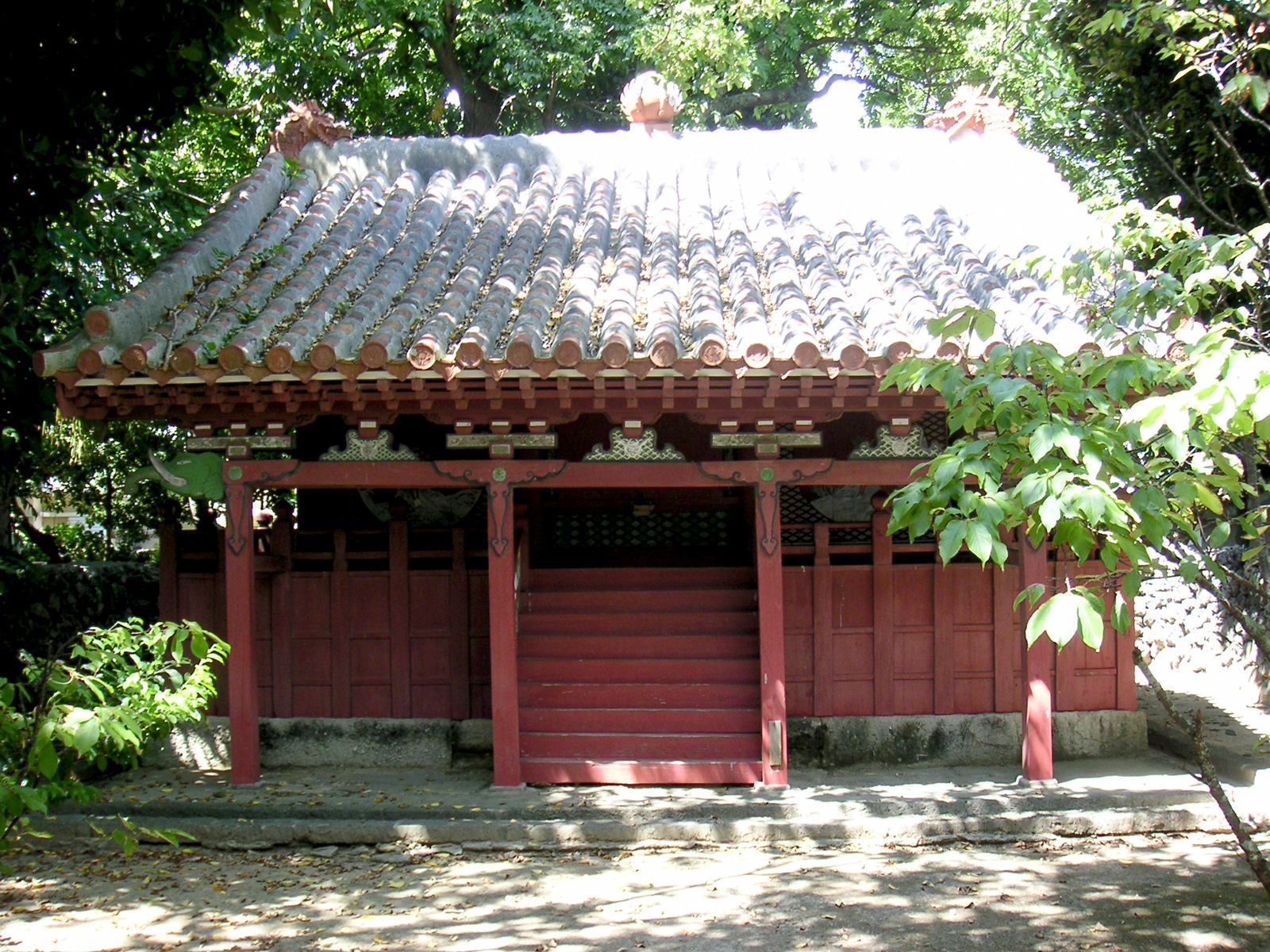
Shinto shrine Gongen Do.

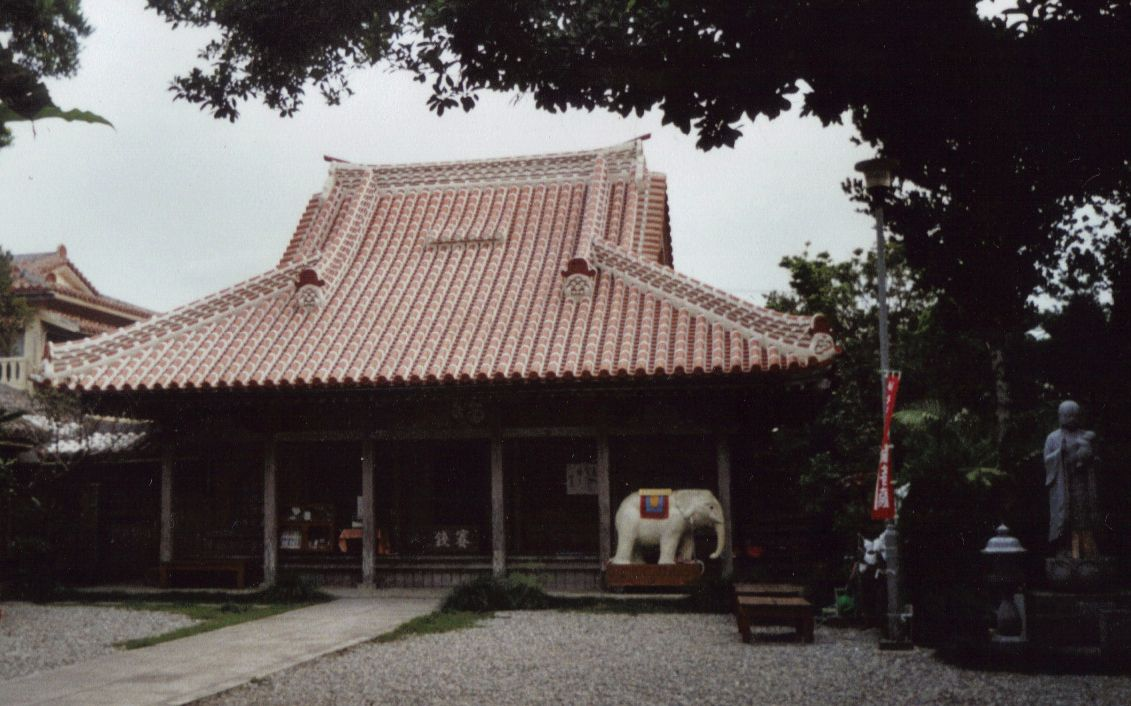
Torin Ji Temple.

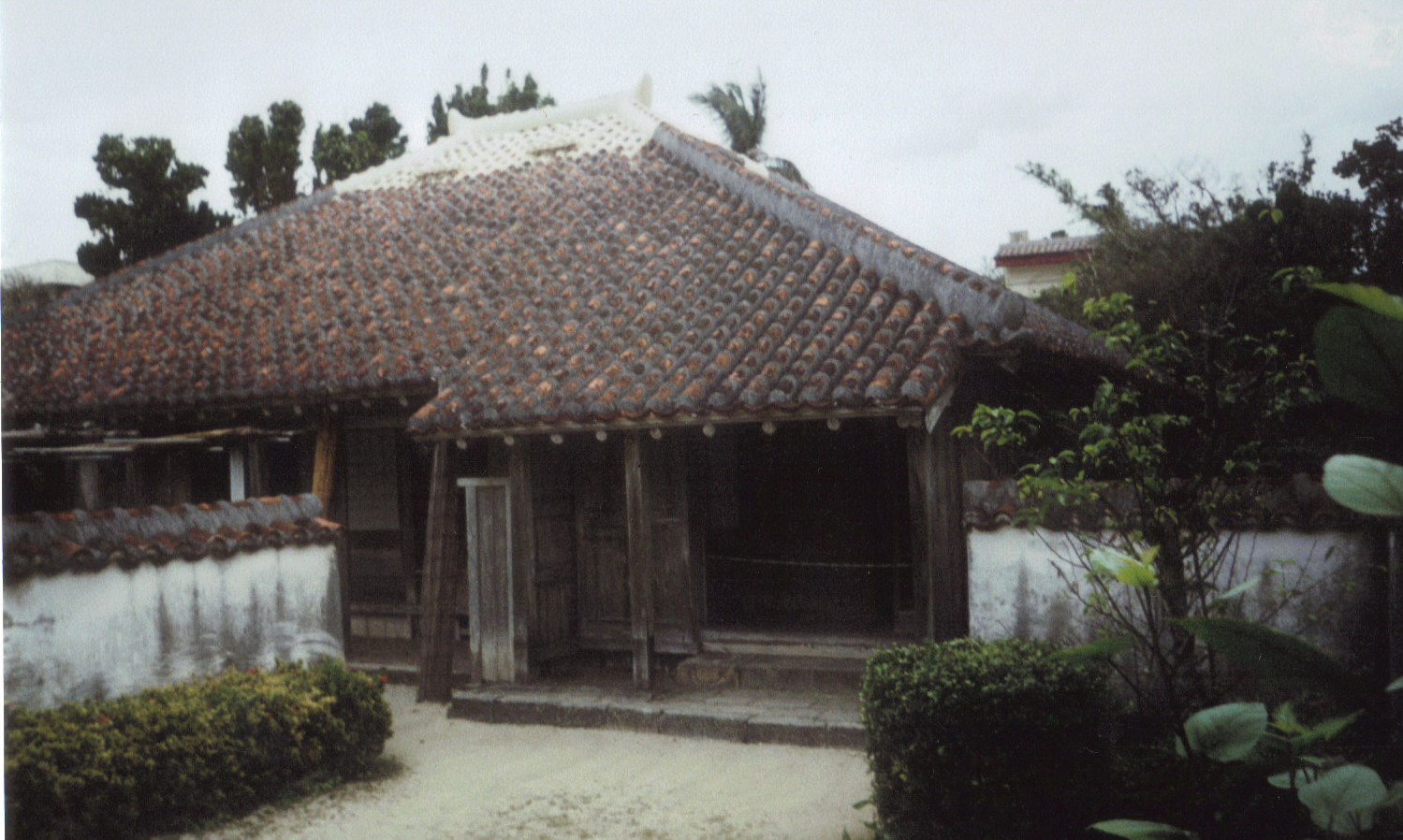
Miyara Donchi.

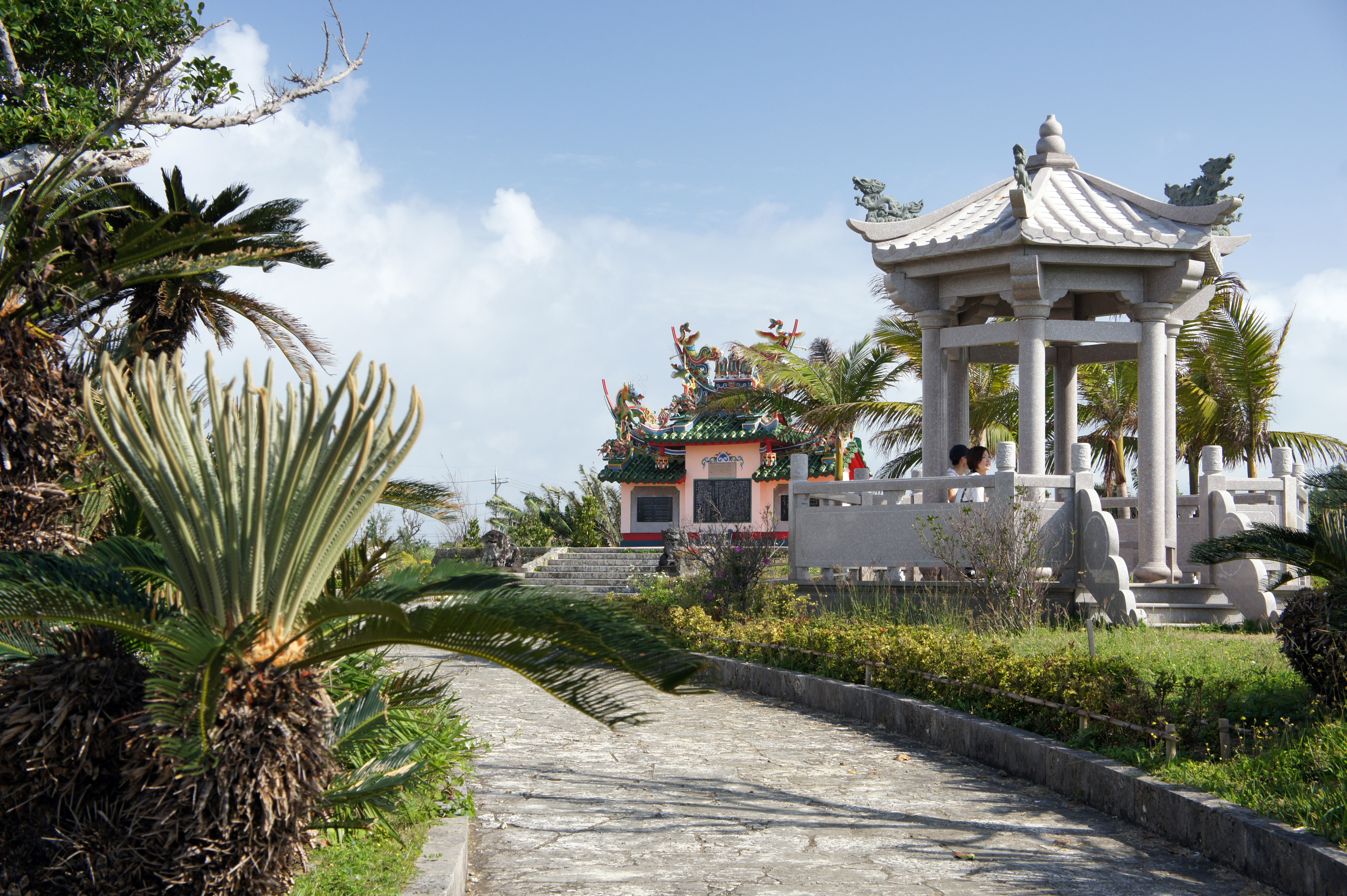
Tojinbaka Tomb.

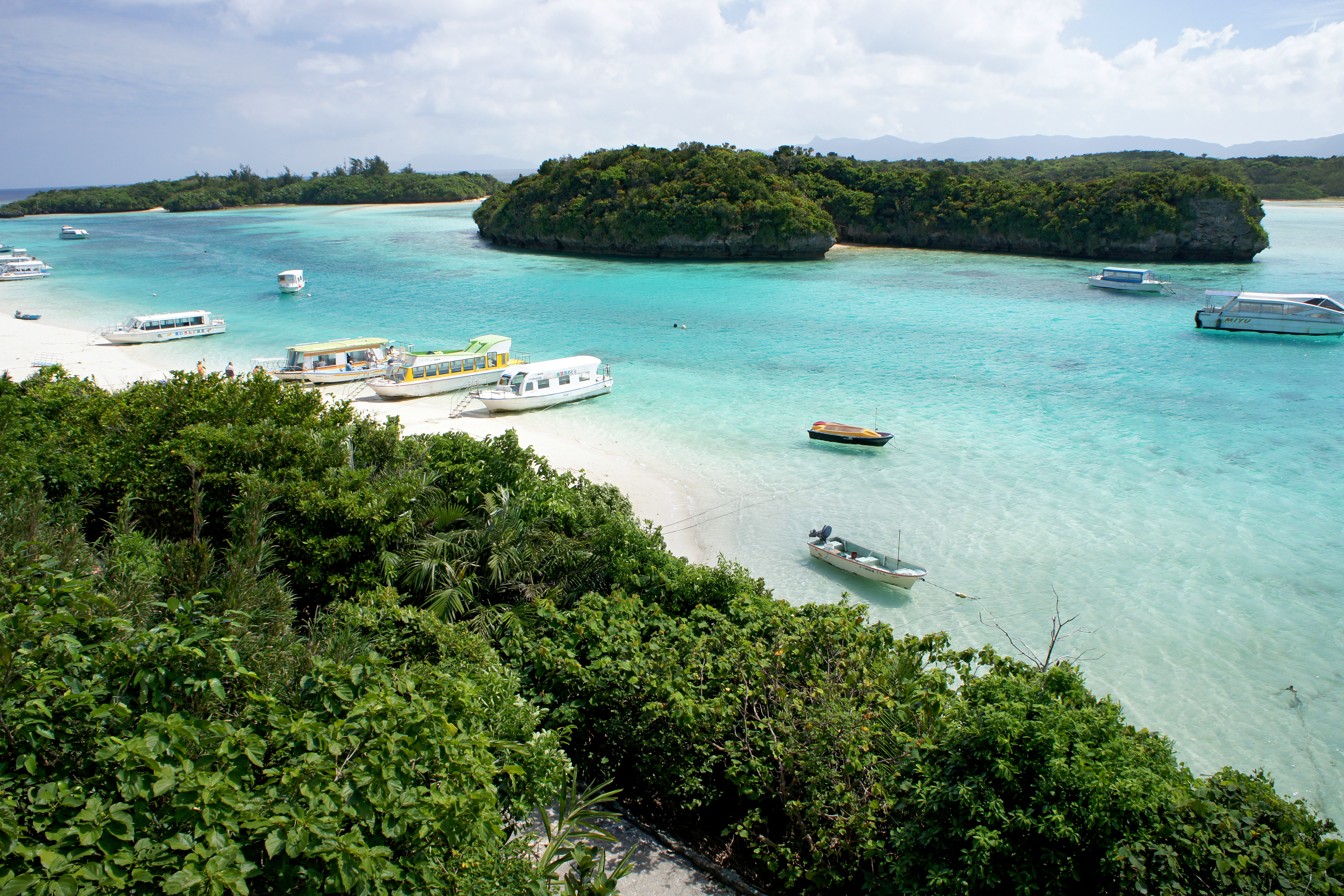
Kabira Bay.

== Cultural properties ==
Designated cultural properties in Ishigaki City include:

- Name (Japanese) (Type of registration)

=== Cultural properties ===
- Akairome Miyatori On / Āra On Sacred Site (赤イロ目宮鳥御嶽) (Municipal)
- Akanmashū's Tomb (赤馬主の墓) (Municipal)
- Chinese coolies' tomb stele (唐人墓碑) (Municipal)
- Cloth sample patterns (御絵図) (Municipal)
- Former Miyara Dunchi residence (旧宮良殿内) (National)
- Former Waukei Family tomb (旧和宇慶家墓) (National)
- Gongen-dō Shrine (権現堂) (National)
- Iritakenishi Family residence (main house, maigusuku, stone wall, well) (入嵩西家住宅 (主屋・マイグスク・石垣・井戸)) (National)
- Ishigaki Yaima Mura: Former Kishaba Family residence (main house) (石垣やいま村旧喜舎場家住宅主屋) (National)
- Ishigaki Yaima Mura: Former Ōhama Family residence (main house) (石垣やいま村旧大浜家住宅主屋) (National)
- Kaiyuan Tongbao coins excavated from Sakieda Akazaki Shell Mound (崎枝赤崎貝塚出土開元通宝) (Municipal)
- Letter of appreciation to Tamayose Sonhan for the rescue operation in the Senkaku Islands (玉代勢孫伴宛尖閣列島遭難救護の感謝状) (Municipal)
- Letter of appreciation to Toyokawa Zensa for the rescue operation in the Senkaku Islands (豊川善佐宛尖閣列島遭難救護の感謝状) (Municipal)
- Misaki On / Mishagi On Sacred Site (美崎御嶽) (Prefectural)
- Miyagi Shin'yū Family Funerary Records (宮城信勇家覚 (葬札)) (Municipal)
- Nagata Family's Old Tomb (長田家の古墓) (Miunicipal)
- Niō god statue of the Tōrin-ji temple (桃林寺仁王像) (Prefectural)
- Portrait of Miyahira Chōen, colour on paper (紙本着色宮平長延画像) (Prefectural)
- Portrait of Tō Nintaku (Chinen Satonushi Pēchin Seigyō), colour on paper (紙本着色東任鐸 (知念里之子親雲上政行) 画像) (Prefectural)
- Sketches by the Kuramoto Master (蔵元絵師の画稿) (Prefectural)
- Sketches by the Yaeyama Kuramoto Master (Miyara Ansen's former possession) (八重山蔵元絵師画稿類（宮良安宣旧蔵）) (National)
- Star Chart (星圖) (Municipal)
- Takehara Family Documents (竹原家文書) (Municipal)
- Tile Inscription (瓦証文) (Municipal)
- Tokuyama Family residence (main house, furiyā, well, stone wall) (渡久山家住宅 (主屋・フリヤー・井戸・石垣)) (National)
- Tomigawa Uēkata's Yaeyama Island Notebooks (Kabira Village) (富川親方八重山島諸締帳 (川平村)) (Municipal)
- Tomigawa Uēkata's Yaeyama Island Notebooks (Miyara Village) (富川親方八重山島諸締帳 (宮良村)) (Municipal)
- Tomigawa Uēkata's Yaeyama Island Sailors Guild Records (富川親方八重山島船手座例帳) (Municipal)
- Tomigawa Uēkata's Yaeyama Island Villages Public Records (Kabira Village) (富川親方八重山島諸村公事帳 (川平村)) (Municipal)
- Tomigawa Uēkata's Yaeyama Island Villages Public Records (Komi Village) (富川親方八重山島諸村公事帳 (古見村)) (Municipal)
- Tomigawa Uēkata's Yaeyama Island Villages Public Records (Tōzato Village) (富川親方八重山島諸村公事帳 (桃里村)) (Municipal)
- Tomigawa Uēkata's Yaeyama Island Warehouse Supervisor Public Records (富川親方八重山島蔵元公事帳) (Municipal)
- Tonoshiro Elementary School Hō-an-den shrine (旧登野城尋常高等小学校の奉安殿) (Municipal)
- Uehara Village Poll Tax Receipt Book (上原村人頭税請取帳) (Municipal)
- Warrant of Appointment of Chōchi of the San'yō Clan as the Ufushuiufuyaku (山陽氏長致宛大首里大屋子職補任辞令書) (Municipal)
- Warrant of Appointment of Chōen of the San'yō Clan as the Ufushuiufuyaku (山陽氏長演宛大首里大屋子職補任辞令書) (Municipal)
- Warrant of Appointment of Chōhō of the San'yō Clan as the Ufushuiufuyaku (山陽氏長房宛大首里大屋子職補任辞令書) (Municipal)
- Warrant of Appointment of Chōki of the San'yō Clan as the Ufushuiufuyaku (山陽氏長季宛大首里大屋子職補任辞令書) (Municipal)
- Warrant of Appointment of Chōyū of the San'yō Clan as the Ufushuiufuyaku (山陽氏長有宛大首里大屋子職補任辞令書) (Municipal)
- Warrant of Appointment of Intsumei, daughter of the former Yaeyama Island Ōamu, to the Post of Ōamu (with San'yō Clan Genealogy appended) (八重山嶋大阿母女子いんつめいへの大阿母補任辞令書(付山陽姓系図家譜)) (Municipal)
- Warrant of Appointment of Ken'ei of the Karin Clan as the Ufushuiufuyaku (夏林氏賢永宛大首里大屋子職補任辞令書) (Municipal)
- Warrant of Appointment of Ken'ei of the Karin Clan as the Ufushuiufuyaku (夏林氏賢栄宛大首里大屋子職補任辞令) (Municipal)
- Warrant of Appointment of Kenhō of the Karin Clan as the Ufushuiufuyaku (夏林氏賢保宛大首里大屋子職補任辞令書) (Municipal)
- Warrant of Appointment of Kensoku of the Karin Clan as the Ufushuiufuyaku (夏林氏賢則宛大首里大屋子職補任辞令書) (Municipal)
- Warrant of Appointment of Mahinama, daughter-in-law of the Yaeyama Island Ōamu, to the Post of Ōamu (with San'yō Clan Genealogy appended) (八重山嶋大阿母前阿母嫁まひなまへの大阿母補任辞令書(付山陽姓系図家譜)) (Municipal)
- Warrant of Appointment of Shinpan of the Chōei Clan as the Ufushuiufuyaku (長栄氏真般宛大首里大屋子職補任辞令書) (Municipal)
- Warrant of Appointment of Tōen of the Matsumō Clan as the Ufushuiufuyaku (松茂氏當演宛大首里大屋子職補任辞令書) (Municipal)
- Warrant of Appointment of Tōkatsu of the Matsumō Clan as the Ufushuiufuyaku (松茂氏當克宛大首里大屋子職補任辞令書) (Municipal)
- Warrant of Appointment of Tōsō of the Matsumō Clan as the Ufushuiufuyaku (松茂氏當宗宛大首里大屋子職補任辞令書) (Municipal)
- Yaeyama Minzoku-en: Former Makishi Family residence (main house) (八重山民俗園旧牧志家住宅主屋) (National)
- Yaeyama Minzoku-en: Former Morita Family residence (main house) (八重山民俗園旧森田家住宅主屋) (National)
- Yasumura Family Documents (安村家文書) (Municipal)
- Yoseyama Uēkata's Yaeyama Island Agricultural Books (与世山親方八重山島農務帳) (Municipal)

=== Folk cultural properties ===
- Angama Masks of Tonoshiro Village (登野城のアンガマ面) (Municipal)
- Feng-shui compass (風水指南針) (Municipal)
- Hatagashira flag books of Arakawa Village (Ishigaki Shikamura) (石垣四箇村 新川の旗頭本) (Prefectural)
- Hatagashira flag book of Ishigaki Village (Ishigaki Shikamura) (石垣四箇村 石垣の旗頭本) (Prefectural)
- Hatagashira flag book of Ōhama Village (大浜村旗頭本) (Municipal)
- Hatagashira flag books of Ōkawa Village (Ishigaki Shikamura) (石垣四箇村 大川の旗頭本) (Prefectural)
- Hatagashira flag book of Tonoshiro Village (Ishigaki Shikamura) (石垣四箇村 登野城の旗頭本) (Prefectural)
- Iyanasu On Sacred Site (米為御嶽) (Municipal)
- Kubantu On Sacred Site (小波本御嶽) (Municipal)
- Mayun-ganashi masks (マユンガナシの面) (Municipal)
- Miyatori On Sacred Site (宮鳥御嶽) (Municipal)
- Nusuku On Sacred Site (野底御嶽) (Municipal)
- On (sacred site) of Yasura Village Remains (安良村跡の御嶽) (Municipal)

=== Historic sites ===
- Adadunā (Sacred) Well (アダドゥナー) (Municipal)
- Furusutobaru Site (フルスト原遺跡) (National)
- Fusaki Kan'non-dō Shrine and its surroundings (冨崎観音堂及びその周辺) (Municipal)
- Fūshinā Kilns (Remains) (黒石川窯跡) (Municipal)
- Hirae Arasuku Village Site (平得アラスク村遺跡) (Prefectural)
- Kabira Shell Mound (川平貝塚) (National)
- Majan-gā (Sacred) Well (真謝井戸) (Municipal)
- Mount Ishisukuyama Remains (石城山残丘部) (Municipal)
- Nagura-shiramizu war-related sites (名蔵白水の戦争遺跡群) (Municipal)
- On (sacred site) of the Former Moriyama Village Remains (旧盛山村跡の御嶽) (Municipal)
- Ōtabaru Site (大田原遺跡) (Municipal)
- Painā-kā (Sacred) Well (パイナーカー) (Municipal)
- Sakishima Beacons and Watchtowers: Hirakubo Watchtower (先島諸島火番盛 遠見番所 (平久保遠見台)) (National)
- Sakishima Beacons and Watchtowers: Kabira Beacon (先島諸島火番盛 遠見番所 (川平火番盛)) (National)
- Shiraho Saonetabaru Cave Site (白保竿根田原洞穴遺跡) (National)
- Third sea fig of Nakadō (仲道の三番アコウ) (Municipal)
- Tomb of Lord Han'nā-shū (ハンナー主の墓) (Municipal)
- Tomino Site (富野遺跡) (Municipal)
- Tōzato Onda Site (桃里恩田遺跡) (Prefectural)
- Transocean Cable Building (Telegramme House) (海底電線陸揚室跡 (電信屋)) (Prefectural)
- Yumutsin-gā Well (世持井戸) (Municipal)

=== Places of scenic beauty ===
- Cape Ugan (御神崎) (National)
- Ishigaki Clan's Gardens (石垣氏庭園) (National)
- Kabira Bay – Mount Omoto (川平湾及び於茂登岳) (National)
- Miyara Dunchi Gardens (宮良殿内庭園) (National)
- Nakamoto Clan's Gardens (仲本氏庭園) (National)

=== Natural monuments ===
- Ara River Formosan cherry habitat (Prunus campanulate) (荒川のカンヒザクラ自生地) (National)
- Ehretia dichotoma tree of Kumō On Sacred Site (小浜御嶽のリュウキュウチシャノキ) (Municipal)
- Ehretia dichotoma tree of Miyatori On Sacred Site (宮鳥御嶽のリュウキュウチシャノキ) (Prefectural)
- Fukidō River mangrove community (吹通川のヒルギ群落) (Municipal)
- Fumidagāra watershed carbonate sediments (フミダカーラ流域の炭酸塩堆積物) (Municipal)
- Ishigaki east coast tsunami rocks: Amatariya Sūari Rock (石垣島東海岸の津波石群 あまたりや潮荒) (National)
- Ishigaki east coast tsunami rocks: Bariishi Rock (石垣島東海岸の津波石群 バリ石) (National)
- Ishigaki east coast tsunami rocks: Takakoruseishi Rock (石垣島東海岸の津波石群 高こるせ石) (National)
- Ishigaki east coast tsunami rocks: Tsunami Ufushi Rock (石垣島東海岸の津波石群 津波大石) (National)
- Ishigaki east coast tsunami rocks: Yasura Ufukane Rock (石垣島東海岸の津波石群 安良大かね) (National)
- Miyara River mangrove forest (宮良川のヒルギ林) (National)
- Mounts Dai-mangē, Shō-mangē and Chū-mangē (大マンゲー・小マンゲー・中マンゲー) (Municipal)
- Ntanāra looking-glass mangrove community (Heritiera littoralis) (ンタナーラのサキシマスオウノキ群落) (National)
- Satake palm community (Satakentia liukiuensis) of Yonehara (米原のヤエヤマヤシ群落) (National)
- Subtropical coastal forest of Nebaru On Sacred Site in Nakasuji Village (仲筋村ネバル御嶽の亜熱帯海岸林) (Prefectural)
- Tamanu tree (Calophyllum inophyllum) lane of Miyaha-hamagawabaru (宮良浜川原のヤラブ（テリハボク）並木) (Municipal)
- Yaeyama rosewood tree (Pterocarpus vidalianus) habitat in Nosoko (野底のヤエヤマシタン自生地) (Municipal)
- Yaeyama rosewood tree (Pterocarpus vidalianus) of Hirakubo (平久保のヤエヤマシタン) (National)
- Yasura Lantern tree communities (Hernandia nymphaeaefolia) of Hirakubo (平久保安良のハスノハギリ群落) (National)

== Notable people from Ishigaki ==
- Yudai Arashiro (born 1995) professional cyclist
- Yukiya Arashiro (born 1984) professional cyclist
- Begin (band) (all members born 1968) pop musical group
- Yōkō Gushiken (born 1955) boxer
- Rimi Natsukawa (born 1973) folk singer
- Kaima Taira (born 1999) professional baseball pitcher

== Sister cities ==
Ishigaki City has four sister cities in Japan and two overseas.

=== In Japan ===
- Kamiita, Tokushima
- Kitakami, Iwate
- Okazaki, Aichi
- Wakkanai, Hokkaido

=== Overseas ===
- Kauaʻi County, Hawaii, United States
- Su'ao, Taiwan
