= Al-Kabir =

Al-Kabir (Kabīr كبير) is one of the Names of God in Islam, meaning "The Great." It may refer to:

- A short form of the name Etrat Ali ('Servant of the Great')
- Bugha al-Kabir, 9th century Turkic general
- Ali Bey Al-Kabir, Mamluk Sultan of Egypt from 1760 to 1772
- Saud al-Kabir (disambiguation)
