= Miyaradunchi =

- 宮良殿内
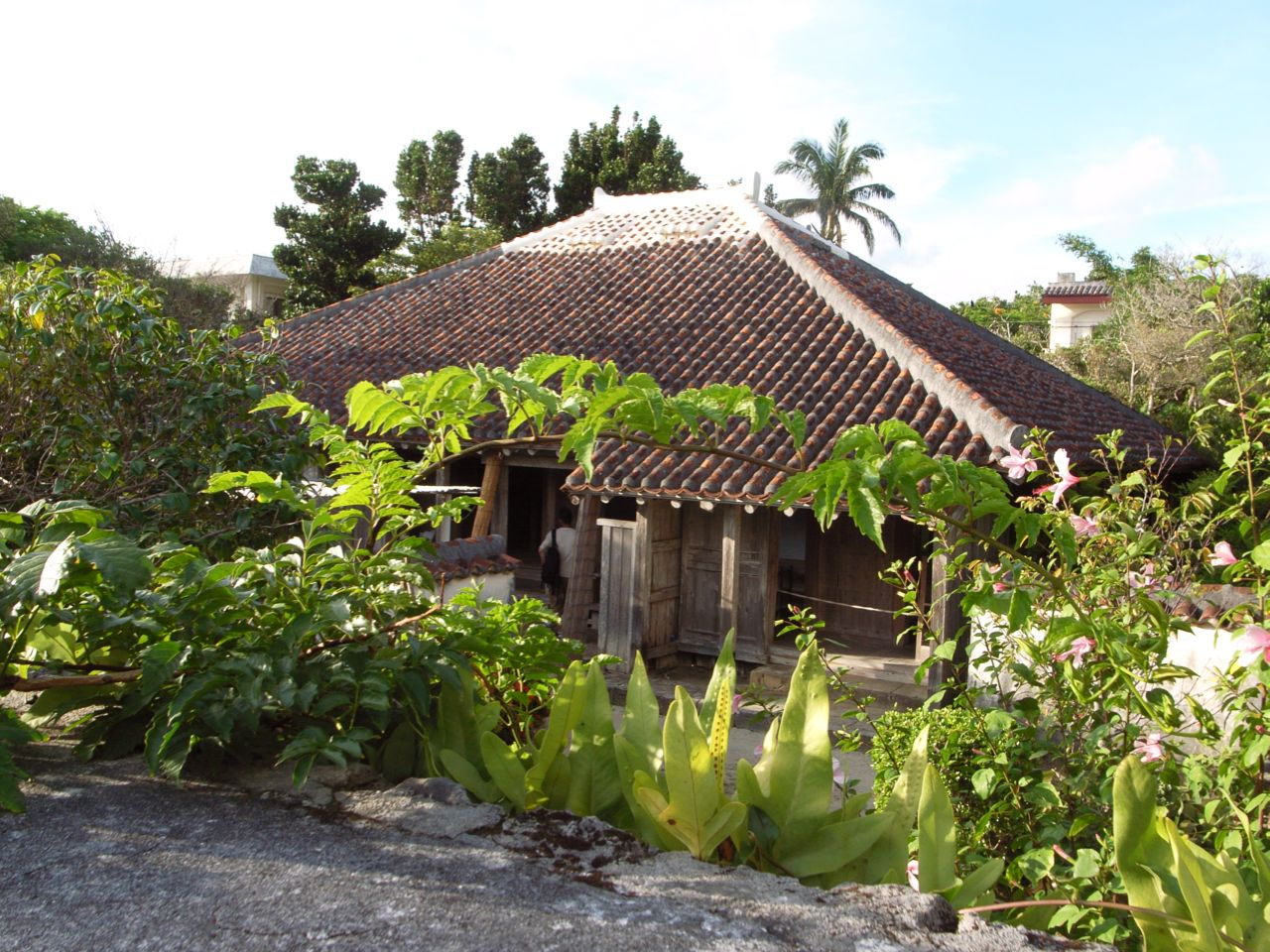
- Miyaradunchi on Ishigaki

General information
- Location: Ishigaki, Okinawa Prefecture, Japan
- Coordinates: 24°20′28″N 124°9′35″E
- Opened: 1819

The old residence of Miyaradunchi (宮良殿内; also read Meeradounujii and Meerayaradunuzi) is located on the island of Ishigaki, Okinawa Prefecture, Japan. Erected around 1819 by the local governor, it has been designated an Important Cultural Property as representative of the architecture of the Yaeyama Islands. The gardens are a Place of Scenic Beauty.

== See also ==
- Ryūkyū Kingdom
- Ryukyuan architecture
- Japanese gardens
