= Kabir Khan =

Kabir Khan may refer to:

- Kabir Khan (cricketer) (born 1974), Pakistani cricketer
- Kabir Khan (director) (born 1971), Indian director, screenwriter, and camera operator
