= Kabir, Kerman =

Kabir كبير
- Village
- Location within Iran
- Coordinates: 29°20′30″N 56°53′33″E
- Country: Iran
- Province: Kerman
- County: Rabor
- Bakhsh: Central
- Rural District: Siyah Banuiyeh

Population (2006)
  - Total: 191
- Time zone: UTC+3:30 (IRST)
  - Summer (DST): UTC+4:30 (IRDT)

Kabir (Persian: كبير, also Romanized as Kabīr; also known as Ka’īr) is a village in Siyah Banuiyeh Rural District, in the Central District of Rabor County, Kerman Province, Iran. At the 2006 census, its population was 191, in 40 families.
