= Mubarak Al-Kabeer =

Mubarak Al-Kabeer may refer to:

- Mubarak Al-Kabeer Al-Sabah, former ruler of Kuwait
- Mubarak Al-Kabeer Governorate, a governorate of Kuwait named after him
- Mubarak Al-Kabeer City, a city in Mubarak Al-Kabeer Governorate
- Mubarak Al-Kabeer Hospital
