= Rezaul Kabir =

Management scholar

Rezaul Kabir is a management scholar specializing in corporate finance and corporate governance. He has conducted cross-disciplinary, empirical and policy-oriented research collaborating with scholars from many different countries. Some of his famous works are on capital market regulation, ownership and control of corporations, capital structure, executive compensation, financial crisis, political connections, and microfinance. Most of his research papers are publicly available on the Social Science Research Network.

Kabir was a keynote speaker at the 2nd Indonesian Finance Association International Conference (held at Yogyakarta); and at the 7th International Conference on Emerging Challenges (held at Hanoi). His paper (co-authored with Prof. Rejie George of Indian Institute of Management, Bangalore): "Heterogeneity in business groups and the corporate diversification - firm performance relationship", published in the Journal of Business Research was awarded the Citations of Excellence Award 2015 by Emerald Group Publishing.

== Education and career ==
Kabir received a PhD in finance from Maastricht University. He received his M.A. degree in economics from KU Leuven and master's degree in business administration from KU Leuven and University of Dhaka. He was a professor and Chair of Finance at University of Stirling from 2005 to 2009, and a professor and Chair of Corporate Finance and Risk Management from 2009 to 2022 at University of Twente.
