= Saud al-Kabir =

Saud al-Kabir (meaning "Saud the Elder" or "Saud the Great") is a title used in Saudi history to refer to:

- Saud bin Abdul-Aziz bin Muhammad bin Saud (died 1814), the third imam of the First Saudi State
- Saud Al Kabeer bin Abdulaziz bin Saud bin Faisal Al Saud (19th century), a first cousin of Saudi Arabia's founder whose descendants form the Saud al-Kabir branch of the House of Saud
- Turki bin Saud al-Kabir (died 2016), a Saudi prince executed for murder
