= List of EVA Air destinations =

EVA Air is a Taiwanese airline based at Taoyuan International Airport in Dayuan District, Taoyuan, near Taipei, operating passenger and dedicated cargo services to over 40 international destinations in Asia, Australia, Europe and North America. EVA Air and their freight division EVA Air Cargo operate flights to the following destinations (excluding code-shares):

== Map ==

Taiwan
EVA Air destinations
EVA Air Cargo only destinations

== List ==
Country	City	Airport	Notes	Refs
Australia	Brisbane	Brisbane Airport	Passenger	
Australia	Melbourne	Melbourne Airport	Terminated	
Australia	Sydney	Sydney Airport	Terminated	
Austria	Vienna	Vienna International Airport	Passenger	
Belgium	Liège	Liège Airport	Terminated	
Cambodia	Phnom Penh	Phnom Penh International Airport	Airport closed	
Cambodia	Phnom Penh	Techo International Airport	Passenger	
Canada	Toronto	Toronto Pearson International Airport	Passenger + cargo	
Canada	Vancouver	Vancouver International Airport	Passenger	
China	Beijing	Beijing Capital International Airport	Passenger	
China	Chengdu	Chengdu Shuangliu International Airport	Passenger	
China	Chengdu	Chengdu Tianfu International Airport	Terminated	
China	Chongqing	Chongqing Jiangbei International Airport	Passenger + cargo	
China	Dalian	Dalian Zhoushuizi International Airport	Passenger	
China	Guangzhou	Guangzhou Baiyun International Airport	Passenger + cargo	
China	Guilin	Guilin Liangjiang International Airport	Passenger	
China	Haikou	Haikou Meilan International Airport	Terminated	
China	Hailar	Hulunbuir Hailar Airport	Terminated	
China	Hangzhou	Hangzhou Xiaoshan International Airport	Passenger	
China	Harbin	Harbin Taiping International Airport	Terminated	
China	Hohhot	Hohhot Baita International Airport	Terminated	
China	Huangshan	Huangshan Tunxi International Airport	Terminated	
China	Jinan	Jinan Yaoqiang International Airport	Passenger	
China	Kunming	Kunming Wujiaba International Airport	Airport closed	
China	Ningbo	Ningbo Lishe International Airport	Passenger	
China	Shanghai	Shanghai Hongqiao International Airport	Passenger	
China	Shanghai	Shanghai Pudong International Airport	Passenger + cargo	
China	Shenzhen	Shenzhen Bao'an International Airport	Passenger + cargo	
China	Taiyuan	Taiyuan Wusu International Airport	Terminated	
China	Tianjin	Tianjin Binhai International Airport	Passenger	
China	Xiamen	Xiamen Gaoqi International Airport	Terminated	
China	Zhengzhou	Zhengzhou Xinzheng International Airport	Passenger	
France	Paris	Charles de Gaulle Airport	Passenger	
Germany	Munich	Munich Airport	Passenger	
Hong Kong	Hong Kong	Hong Kong International Airport	Passenger + cargo	
Hong Kong	Hong Kong	Kai Tak Airport	Airport closed	
India	Delhi	Indira Gandhi International Airport	Begins 1 December 2026	
India	Mumbai	Chhatrapati Shivaji Maharaj International Airport	Terminated	
Indonesia	Denpasar	Ngurah Rai International Airport	Passenger	
Indonesia	Jakarta	Soekarno–Hatta International Airport	Passenger	
Indonesia	Surabaya	Juanda International Airport	Terminated	
Italy	Milan	Milan Malpensa Airport	Passenger	
Japan	Aomori	Aomori Airport	Passenger	
Japan	Asahikawa	Asahikawa Airport	Seasonal	
Japan	Fukuoka	Fukuoka Airport	Passenger	
Japan	Hakodate	Hakodate Airport	Terminated	
Japan	Kobe	Kobe Airport	Passenger	
Japan	Komatsu	Komatsu Airport	Passenger	
Japan	Matsuyama	Matsuyama Airport	Passenger	
Japan	Miyazaki	Miyazaki Airport	Terminated	
Japan	Nagoya	Chubu Centrair International Airport	Terminated	
Japan	Okayama	Okayama Airport	Terminated	
Japan	Okinawa	Naha Airport	Passenger	
Japan	Osaka	Kansai International Airport	Passenger + cargo	
Japan	Sapporo	New Chitose Airport	Passenger	
Japan	Sendai	Sendai Airport	Passenger	
Japan	Tokyo	Haneda Airport	Passenger	
Japan	Tokyo	Narita International Airport	Passenger + cargo	
Laos	Vientiane	Wattay International Airport	Terminated	
Macau	Macau	Macau International Airport	Passenger	
Malaysia	Kuala Lumpur	Kuala Lumpur International Airport	Passenger	
Malaysia	Penang	Penang International Airport	Cargo	
Maldives	Malé	Velana International Airport	Terminated	
Myanmar	Yangon	Yangon International Airport	Terminated	
Netherlands	Amsterdam	Amsterdam Airport Schiphol	Passenger	
New Zealand	Auckland	Auckland Airport	Terminated	
New Zealand	Christchurch	Christchurch Airport	Terminated	
Panama	Panama City	Tocumen International Airport	Terminated	
Philippines	Cebu	Mactan–Cebu International Airport	Passenger	
Philippines	Clark	Clark International Airport	Passenger	
Philippines	Manila	Ninoy Aquino International Airport	Passenger	
Russia	Moscow	Sheremetyevo International Airport	Terminated	
Singapore	Singapore	Changi Airport	Passenger + cargo	
South Korea	Busan	Gimhae International Airport	Passenger	
South Korea	Seoul	Gimpo International Airport	Passenger	
South Korea	Seoul	Incheon International Airport	Passenger	
Taiwan	Kaohsiung	Kaohsiung International Airport	Focus city	
Taiwan	Taichung	Taichung International Airport	Passenger	
Taiwan	Taipei	Songshan Airport	Focus city	
Taiwan	Taipei	Taoyuan International Airport	Hub	
Thailand	Bangkok	Don Mueang International Airport	Terminated	
Thailand	Bangkok	Suvarnabhumi Airport	Passenger + cargo	
Thailand	Chiang Mai	Chiang Mai International Airport	Passenger	
Thailand	Phuket	Phuket International Airport	Passenger	
Turkey	Istanbul	Atatürk Airport	Airport closed	
Turkey	Istanbul	Istanbul Airport	Cargo	
United Arab Emirates	Dubai	Dubai International Airport	Terminated	
United Kingdom	London	Heathrow Airport	Passenger	
United States	Anchorage	Ted Stevens Anchorage International Airport	Cargo	
United States	Atlanta	Hartsfield–Jackson Atlanta International Airport	Cargo	
United States	Boston	Logan International Airport	Cargo	
United States	Chicago	O'Hare International Airport	Passenger + cargo	
United States	Dallas	Dallas Fort Worth International Airport	Passenger + cargo	
United States	Honolulu	Daniel K. Inouye International Airport	Terminated	
United States	Houston	George Bush Intercontinental Airport	Passenger	
United States	Los Angeles	Los Angeles International Airport	Passenger + cargo	
United States	Newark	Newark Liberty International Airport	Terminated	
United States	New York City	John F. Kennedy International Airport	Passenger	
United States	San Francisco	San Francisco International Airport	Passenger	
United States	Seattle	Seattle–Tacoma International Airport	Passenger	
United States	Washington, D.C.	Dulles International Airport	Passenger	
Vietnam	Da Nang	Da Nang International Airport	Passenger	
Vietnam	Hanoi	Noi Bai International Airport	Passenger + cargo	
Vietnam	Ho Chi Minh City	Tan Son Nhat International Airport	Passenger + cargo	

== See also ==
- List of China Airlines destinations
- List of Starlux Airlines destinations
