= List of China Airlines destinations =

== Map ==
China Airlines destinations (January 2025)

Republic of China (Taiwan)
Passenger and cargo
Passenger only
Cargo only
Terminated

== List ==
As of July 2026, China Airlines is the largest airline in, and the flag carrier of the Republic of China (Taiwan). The airline operates over 1,300 flights weekly to 95(+1) airports in 91(+1) cities across Asia, North America, Europe, and Oceania (brackets indicate future destinations) (excluding codeshare). Airports with China Airlines operations are listed below.

Country	City	Airport	Notes	Refs
Australia	Brisbane	Brisbane Airport	Passenger	
Australia	Melbourne	Melbourne Airport	Passenger	
Australia	Sydney	Sydney Airport	Passenger	
Austria	Vienna	Vienna International Airport	Passenger	
Cambodia	Phnom Penh	Phnom Penh International Airport	Airport closed	
Cambodia	Phnom Penh	Techo International Airport	Passenger	
Canada	Calgary	Calgary International Airport	Terminated	
Canada	Toronto	Toronto Pearson International Airport	Cargo	
Canada	Vancouver	Vancouver International Airport	Passenger	
China	Beijing	Beijing Capital International Airport	Passenger	
China	Changsha	Changsha Huanghua International Airport	Passenger	
China	Chengdu	Chengdu Shuangliu International Airport	Passenger	
China	Chengdu	Chengdu Tianfu International Airport	Terminated	
China	Chongqing	Chongqing Jiangbei International Airport	Passenger + cargo	
China	Fuzhou	Fuzhou Changle International Airport	Passenger; Operates for Mandarin Airlines	
China	Guangzhou	Guangzhou Baiyun International Airport	Passenger + cargo	
China	Haikou	Haikou Meilan International Airport	Passenger	
China	Hangzhou	Hangzhou Xiaoshan International Airport	Passenger; Operates for Mandarin Airlines	
China	Lijiang	Lijiang Sanyi International Airport	Terminated	
China	Nanchang	Nanchang Changbei International Airport	Passenger	
China	Nanjing	Nanjing Lukou International Airport	Passenger + cargo	
China	Ningbo	Ningbo Lishe International Airport	Passenger; Operates for Mandarin Airlines	
China	Qingdao	Qingdao Jiaodong International Airport	Passenger	
China	Qingdao	Qingdao Liuting International Airport	Airport closed	
China	Sanya	Sanya Phoenix International Airport	Passenger	
China	Shanghai	Shanghai Hongqiao International Airport	Passenger	
China	Shanghai	Shanghai Pudong International Airport	Passenger + cargo	
China	Shenzhen	Shenzhen Bao'an International Airport	Passenger + cargo	
China	Shenyang	Shenyang Taoxian International Airport	Passenger; Operates for Mandarin Airlines	
China	Weihai	Weihai Dashuipo International Airport	Passenger	
China	Wenzhou	Wenzhou Longwan International Airport	Passenger; Operates for Mandarin Airlines	
China	Wuhan	Wuhan Tianhe International Airport	Passenger	
China	Wuxi	Sunan Shuofang International Airport	Passenger	
China	Xiamen	Xiamen Gaoqi International Airport	Passenger + cargo	
China	Xi'an	Xi'an Xianyang International Airport	Passenger	
China	Xuzhou	Xuzhou Guanyin International Airport	Passenger	
China	Yangzhou	Yangzhou Taizhou International Airport	Passenger	
China	Yantai	Yantai Laishan Airport	Airport closed	
China	Zhengzhou	Zhengzhou Xinzheng International Airport	Passenger + cargo	
Czech Republic	Prague	Václav Havel Airport Prague	Passenger + cargo	
Egypt	Cairo	Cairo International Airport	Terminated	
Germany	Frankfurt	Frankfurt Airport	Passenger + cargo	
Guam	Hagåtña	Antonio B. Won Pat International Airport	Passenger	
Hong Kong	Hong Kong	Hong Kong International Airport	Passenger + cargo	
Hong Kong	Hong Kong	Kai Tak Airport	Airport closed	
India	Delhi	Indira Gandhi International Airport	Terminated	
India	Delhi	Indira Gandhi International Airport	Cargo	
India	Mumbai	Chhatrapati Shivaji Maharaj International Airport	Cargo	
Indonesia	Denpasar	Ngurah Rai International Airport	Passenger	
Indonesia	Jakarta	Soekarno–Hatta International Airport	Passenger + cargo	
Indonesia	Medan	Polonia International Airport	Airport closed	
Indonesia	Surabaya	Juanda International Airport	Terminated	
Italy	Milan	Milan Malpensa Airport	Terminated	
Italy	Rome	Rome Fiumicino Airport	Passenger	
Japan	Fukuoka	Fukuoka Airport	Passenger	
Japan	Hiroshima	Hiroshima Airport	Passenger	
Japan	Ishigaki	New Ishigaki Airport	Seasonal	
Japan	Kagoshima	Kagoshima Airport	Passenger	
Japan	Kumamoto	Kumamoto Airport	Passenger	
Japan	Miyazaki	Miyazaki Airport	Passenger	
Japan	Nagoya	Chubu Centrair International Airport	Passenger + cargo	
Japan	Okinawa	Naha Airport	Passenger	
Japan	Osaka	Itami Airport	Terminated	
Japan	Osaka	Kansai International Airport	Passenger + cargo	
Japan	Sapporo	New Chitose Airport	Passenger	
Japan	Shizuoka	Shizuoka Airport	Passenger	
Japan	Takamatsu	Takamatsu Airport	Passenger	
Japan	Tokyo	Haneda Airport	Passenger	
Japan	Tokyo	Narita International Airport	Passenger + cargo	
Japan	Toyama	Toyama Airport	Passenger	
Luxembourg	Luxembourg City	Luxembourg Airport	Cargo	
Malaysia	Kuala Lumpur	Kuala Lumpur International Airport	Passenger + cargo	
Malaysia	Kuala Lumpur	Sultan Abdul Aziz Shah Airport	Terminated	
Malaysia	Penang	Penang International Airport	Passenger + cargo	
Myanmar	Yangon	Yangon International Airport	Passenger	
Netherlands	Amsterdam	Amsterdam Airport Schiphol	Passenger + cargo	
New Zealand	Auckland	Auckland Airport	Passenger	
New Zealand	Christchurch	Christchurch Airport ^{Seasonal}	Terminated	
Palau	Koror	Roman Tmetuchl International Airport	Passenger	
Philippines	Cebu	Mactan–Cebu International Airport	Passenger	
Philippines	Laoag	Laoag International Airport	Terminated	
Philippines	Manila	Ninoy Aquino International Airport	Passenger + cargo	
Saudi Arabia	Dhahran	Dhahran International Airport	Airport v	
Saudi Arabia	Jeddah	King Abdulaziz International Airport	Terminated	
Singapore	Singapore	Changi Airport	Passenger + cargo	
Singapore	Singapore	Singapore International Airport	Airport closed	
South Korea	Busan	Gimhae International Airport	Passenger	
South Korea	Cheongju	Cheongju International Airport ^{Charter}	Terminated	
South Korea	Daegu	Daegu International Airport ^{Charter}	Terminated	
South Korea	Gwangju	Gwangju Airport ^{Charter}	Terminated	
South Korea	Seoul	Gimpo International Airport	Passenger	
South Korea	Seoul	Incheon International Airport	Passenger + cargo	
Sweden	Stockholm	Stockholm Arlanda Airport ^{Cargo}	Terminated	
Switzerland	Zürich	Zurich Airport	Terminated	
Sri Lanka	Colombo	Bandaranaike International Airport ^{Cargo}	Terminated	
Taiwan	Kaohsiung	Kaohsiung International Airport	Focus city	
Taiwan	Taichung	Taichung International Airport	Terminated	
Taiwan	Tainan	Tainan Airport	Passenger	
Taiwan	Taipei	Songshan Airport	Focus city	
Taiwan	Taipei	Taoyuan International Airport	Hub	
Thailand	Bangkok	Don Mueang International Airport	Terminated	
Thailand	Bangkok	Suvarnabhumi Airport	Passenger + cargo	
Thailand	Chiang Mai	Chiang Mai International Airport	Passenger	
Thailand	Phuket	Phuket International Airport	Terminated	
United Arab Emirates	Abu Dhabi	Abu Dhabi International Airport	Terminated	
United Arab Emirates	Dubai	Al Maktoum International Airport	Cargo	
United Kingdom	London	Gatwick Airport	Terminated	
United Kingdom	London	Heathrow Airport	Passenger	
United Kingdom	Manchester	Manchester Airport	Terminated	
United States	Anchorage	Ted Stevens Anchorage International Airport	Cargo	
United States	Atlanta	Hartsfield–Jackson Atlanta International Airport	Cargo	
United States	Boston	Logan International Airport	Cargo	
United States	Chicago	O'Hare International Airport	Cargo	
United States	Columbus	Rickenbacker International Airport	Cargo	
United States	Dallas/Fort Worth	Dallas Fort Worth International Airport	Cargo	
United States	Honolulu	Daniel K. Inouye International Airport	Terminated	
United States	Houston	George Bush Intercontinental Airport	Cargo	
United States	Los Angeles	Los Angeles International Airport	Passenger + cargo	
United States	Miami	Miami International Airport	Cargo	
United States	Nashville	Nashville International Airport ^{Cargo}	Terminated	
United States	New York City	John F. Kennedy International Airport	Passenger + cargo	
United States	Ontario, CA	Ontario International Airport	Passenger	
United States	Phoenix, AZ	Phoenix Sky Harbor International Airport	Passenger	
United States	San Francisco	San Francisco International Airport	Passenger + cargo	
United States	Seattle	Seattle–Tacoma International Airport	Passenger + cargo	
Vietnam	Da Nang	Da Nang International Airport	Passenger	
Vietnam	Hanoi	Noi Bai International Airport	Passenger + cargo	
Vietnam	Ho Chi Minh City	Tan Son Nhat International Airport	Passenger + cargo	
