= RJAF =

RJAF may refer to:

- Royal Jordanian Air Force
- Matsumoto Airport (ICAO airport code RJAF)
