= Fuji Dream Airlines =

Japanese airline

Fuji Dream Airlines フジドリームエアラインズ Fuji Dorīmu Earainzu

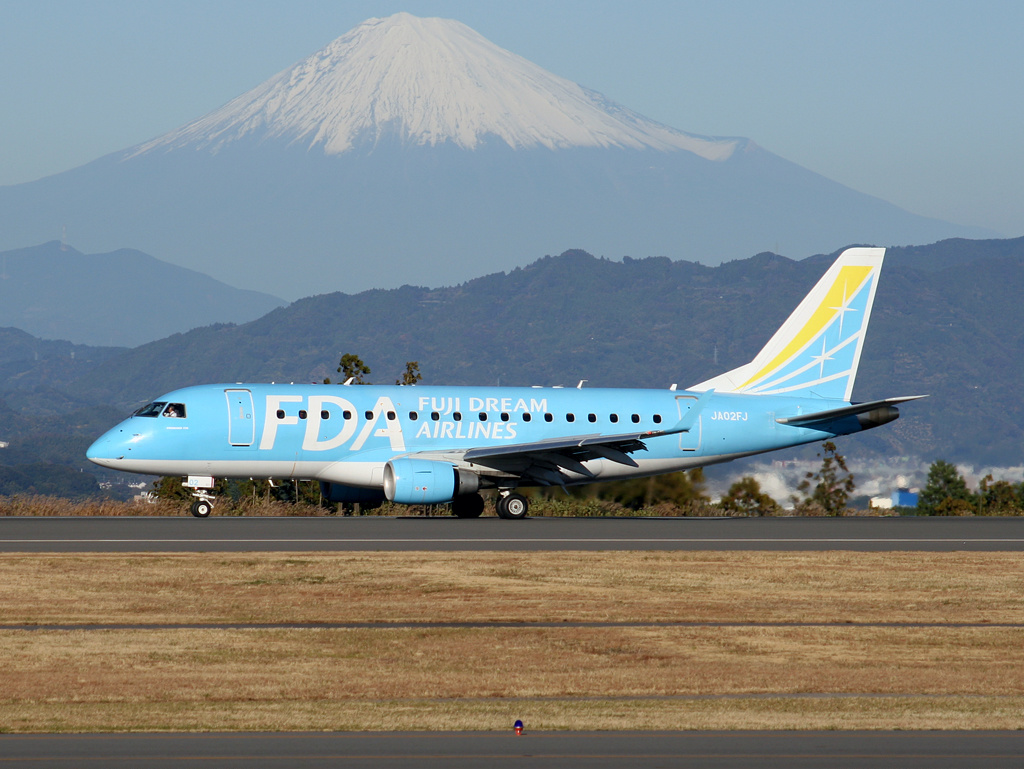
- Fuji Dream Airlines Embraer 170 at Shizuoka Airport with the background of Mount Fuji
IATA	ICAO	Call sign
JH	FDA	FUJI DREAM
- Founded: June 24, 2008; 18 years ago
- Commenced operations: July 23, 2009; 17 years ago
- Operating bases: Fukuoka; Nagoya–Komaki; Shizuoka
- Fleet size: 15
- Destinations: 17
- Parent company: Suzuyo & Co., Ltd.
- Headquarters: Shimizu-ku, Shizuoka, Japan
- Key people: Yohei Suzuki (Chairman & CEO)
- Website: www.fujidream.co.jp/en

Fuji Dream Airlines Co., Ltd. (FDA) (株式会社フジ ドリーム エアラインズ, Kabushiki-gaisha Fuji Dorīmu Earainzu) is a Japanese regional airline headquartered in Shimizu-ku, Shizuoka, Shizuoka Prefecture. It operates a fleet of 15 Embraer E-Jets with bases at Fukuoka Airport, Nagoya Airfield and Shizuoka Airport. The airline commenced operations on July 23, 2009.

== History ==
Prior to the airline's establishment, Suzuyo & Co., Ltd. signed a purchase agreement with Embraer on November 30, 2007 for two Embraer E170s for its startup airline, with a purchase right to acquire one additional aircraft. The contract value was estimated to be approximately US$87 million, if the purchase right was exercised. At that time, the yet-to-be-established airline was Embraer's second customer in Japan. Suzuyo later established the airline as Fuji Dream Airlines on June 24, 2008 with an initial capital of ¥450 million, with Yohei Suzuki serving as the airline's president and chief executive officer (CEO).

On October 27, 2008, Embraer received the type certification from the Japan Civil Aviation Bureau (JCAB) to operate the Embraer E170 in Japan, with Fuji Dream Airlines receiving its first Embraer E170 on February 20, 2009 as Embraer's second Japanese customer, following J-Air. On June 15, 2009, the contract between Embraer and the airline was amended, allowing for the airline to acquire the larger Embraer E175, which was delivered in January 2010.

The airline's inaugural flight occurred on July 23, 2009, with its initial operations consisting of two daily flights to Komatsu Airport and one daily flight each to Kagoshima and Kumamoto from its home base at Shizuoka Airport. On April 1, 2010, the airline commenced three daily flights between Matsumoto Airport to Fukuoka and one daily flight between Matsumoto and Sapporo Chitose, taking over the services of Japan Airlines (JAL) on the routes as part of a new codeshare agreement.

Fuji Dream's route network expanded further as the airline received new aircraft, including services from Shizuoka and Nagoya Airfield (Nagoya Komaki) to Fukuoka in October 2010, services from Nagoya Komaki to Kumamoto and from Shizuoka to Sapporo Chitose in March 2011, services from Nagoya Komaki to Aomori and Hanamaki in August 2011, and service between Fukuoka and Niigata in October 2011. In January 2013, the airline added Kōchi Airport as a new destination with services from Nagoya Komaki beginning in March 2013. In March 2014, the airline added Yamagata Airport as a new destination with services from Nagoya Komaki. In March 2015, the airline added new service to Izumo and Kitakyushu from Nagoya Komaki. In April 2016, the airline announced service to a second Sapporo airport, with flights to Okadama Airport from Shizuoka beginning in June 2016.

In January 2018, Fuji Dream Airlines announced routes from Izumo to both Shizuoka and Sendai Airport as a new destination, beginning in March and April 2018 respectively. During late 2019, the airline added new routes to Kobe Airport, with services from Izumo, Kochi, and Matsumoto.

== Corporate affairs ==
The head office of Fuji Dream Airlines is in Shimizu-ku, Shizuoka Prefecture. The airline is a wholly owned subsidiary of Suzuyo & Co., Ltd., whose core businesses include domestic and international logistics.

On June 22, 2020, the airline appointed Shunichi Kususe as CEO and Tokuyasu Miwa as company president, following former president and CEO Yohei Suzuki's retirement from the airline.

== Destinations ==
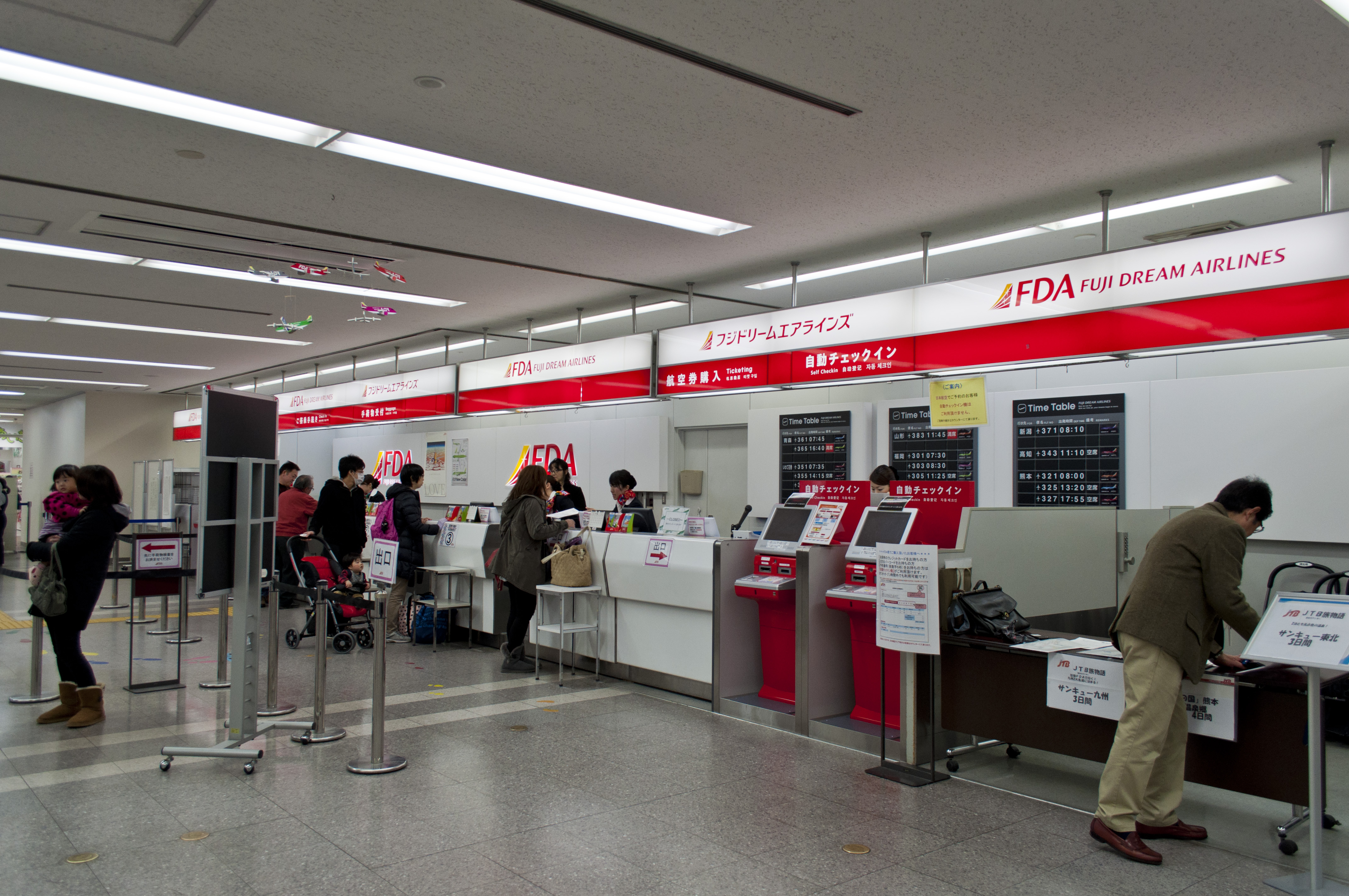
Fuji Dream Airlines check-in facilities at Nagoya Airfield

As of August 2024, Fuji Dream Airlines operates or has operated scheduled flights to the following destinations in Japan:

Island	City	Airport	Notes	Refs
Hokkaidō	Sapporo	New Chitose Airport		
Hokkaidō	Sapporo	Okadama Airport		
Honshū	Aomori	Aomori Airport		
Honshū	Hanamaki	Hanamaki Airport		
Honshū	Izumo	Izumo Airport		
Honshū	Kobe	Kobe Airport	Base	
Honshū	Komatsu	Komatsu Airport	Terminated	
Honshū	Matsumoto	Matsumoto Airport		
Honshū	Nagoya	Chubu Centrair International Airport		
Honshū	Nagoya	Nagoya Airfield	Base	
Honshū	Niigata	Niigata Airport		
Honshū	Sendai	Sendai Airport	Terminated	
Honshū	Shizuoka	Shizuoka Airport	Base	
Honshū	Yamagata	Yamagata Airport		
Kyūshū	Fukuoka	Fukuoka Airport	Base	
Kyūshū	Kagoshima	Kagoshima Airport		
Kyūshū	Kitakyushu	Kitakyushu Airport	Terminated	
Kyūshū	Kumamoto	Kumamoto Airport		
Shikoku	Kōchi	Kōchi Airport		

=== Codeshare agreements ===
Fuji Dream Airlines has codeshare agreements with the following airlines:

- Japan Airlines

=== Interline agreements ===
- Hahn Air

== Fleet ==
=== Current fleet ===
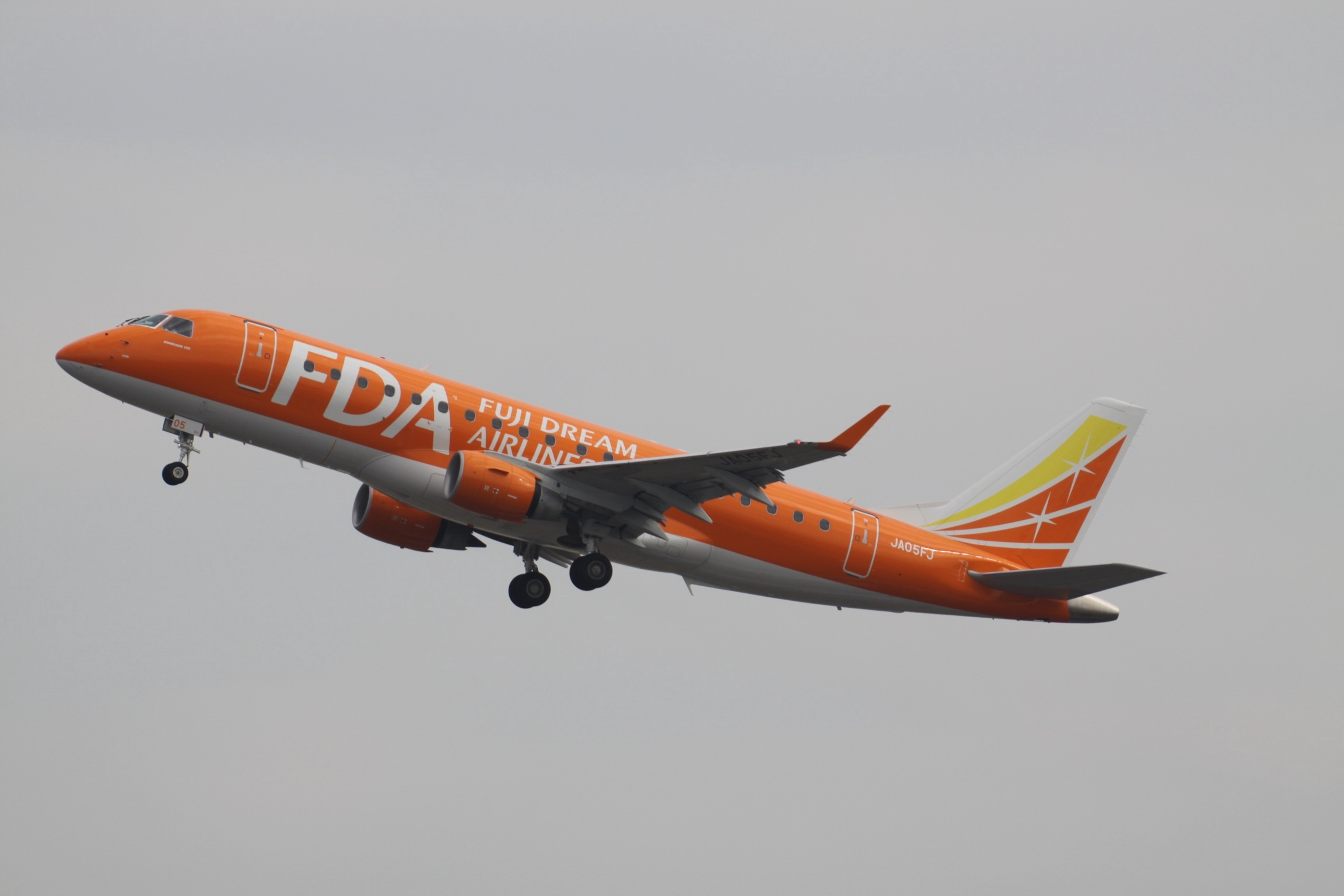
A Fuji Dream Airlines Embraer E170 in orange livery, all aircraft of the airline wear a different color scheme.

As of July 2026, Fuji Dream Airlines operates the following aircraft:

Fuji Dream Airlines fleet
Aircraft	In service	Orders	Passengers	Notes
Embraer E170	2	—	76	
Embraer E175	13	2	84	Deliveries begin 2027.
Total	15	2		

=== Former fleet ===
As of August 2025, Fuji Dream Airlines operated 2 Embraer 170 and 13 Embraer 175.

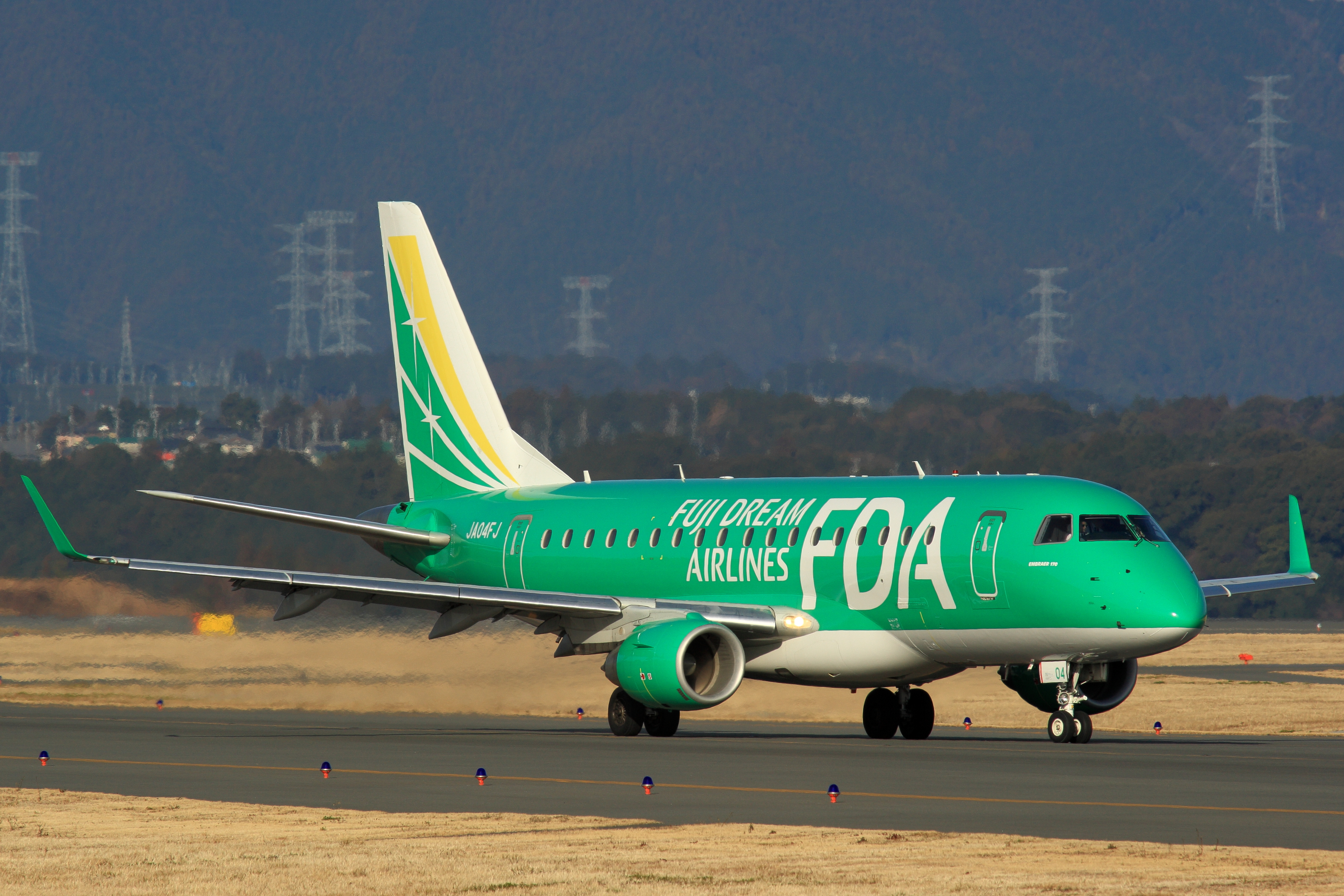
JA04FJ, the aircraft was retired from FDA in 2024

JA04FJ, Embraer ERJ-170SU: 4th aircraft. This aircraft was originally operated by Shuttle America and Republic Airways as N866RW, and was the only used aircraft (manufactured in 2006) in FDA's fleet. It arrived at Shizuoka Airport on October 12, 2010. The aircraft color is green, which was the most popular color in the poll on the official FDA website, and official image of the color was "Shizuoka's tea and the mountains of Shinshu. In addition, the survey was conducted by calling for votes on the official website of Matsumoto Yamaga FC, a soccer club in Nagano Prefecture, so the color was unofficially considered the "Yamaga color" by the local press, Matsumoto Yamaga FC, and the club's supporters. In 2011, a sticker of Alp-chan, a popular character of Matsumoto City, Nagano Prefecture, was affixed to the rear of the aircraft, and in July 2011, it was appointed as a tourism ambassador for Matsumoto City, but with the introduction of JA11FJ, painted in the same colors as JA04FJ, its appointment as a tourism ambassador was terminated. It retired on March 9, 2024 with FDA Flight 418 departing Izumo Airport at 18:10 and arriving at Komaki Airport at 19:40. After this flight, this aircraft was dismantled at Komaki Airport after some parts were removed and its nose section and winglet were donated to Matsumoto Airport.

=== Fleet development ===
Fuji Dream Airlines launched in July 2009 with an initial fleet of two Embraer E170 aircraft, before receiving its first Embraer E175 aircraft in January 2010 and an additional E170 and E175 in October 2010, with the airline's fleet by then consisting of three E170s and two E175s. The airline's Embraer E175 fleet continued to grow in subsequent years, with orders for one E175 and one purchase right in October 2010, two E175s in December 2012, three E175s with three purchase rights in July 2014, three E175s with three purchase rights in June 2017, and two E175s in June 2019.

In June 2017, the airline had expressed interest in both the Embraer E190-E2 and Mitsubishi MRJ (later the SpaceJet) in order to operate aircraft with a higher seating capacity, but in the case of the SpaceJet had decided to wait for the aircraft's eventual launch to observe its operating performance before making a decision.

=== Livery ===
Fuji Dream Airlines' aircraft livery consists of a solid color across the aircraft's fuselage, engines, and wingtips, with the airline's wordmark and name written on the fuselage, usually in white. Individual aircraft are given a unique color scheme making them distinct from one another, such as in red, light blue, green, gold, silver, or violet. The vertical stabilizer (tail fin) features the airline's logo, itself resembling Mount Fuji backed by a morning sunrise, colored to mirror the aircraft's given color scheme, with the exception of the logo's uppermost yellow stripe, resembling the morning sun. One aircraft, an Embraer E175 registered JA12FJ, instead features a predominantly inverted color scheme consisting of a solid white fuselage, with the airline's wordmark, logo, engines, and wingtips largely painted in the brand's standard red color.

== Cabin and services ==
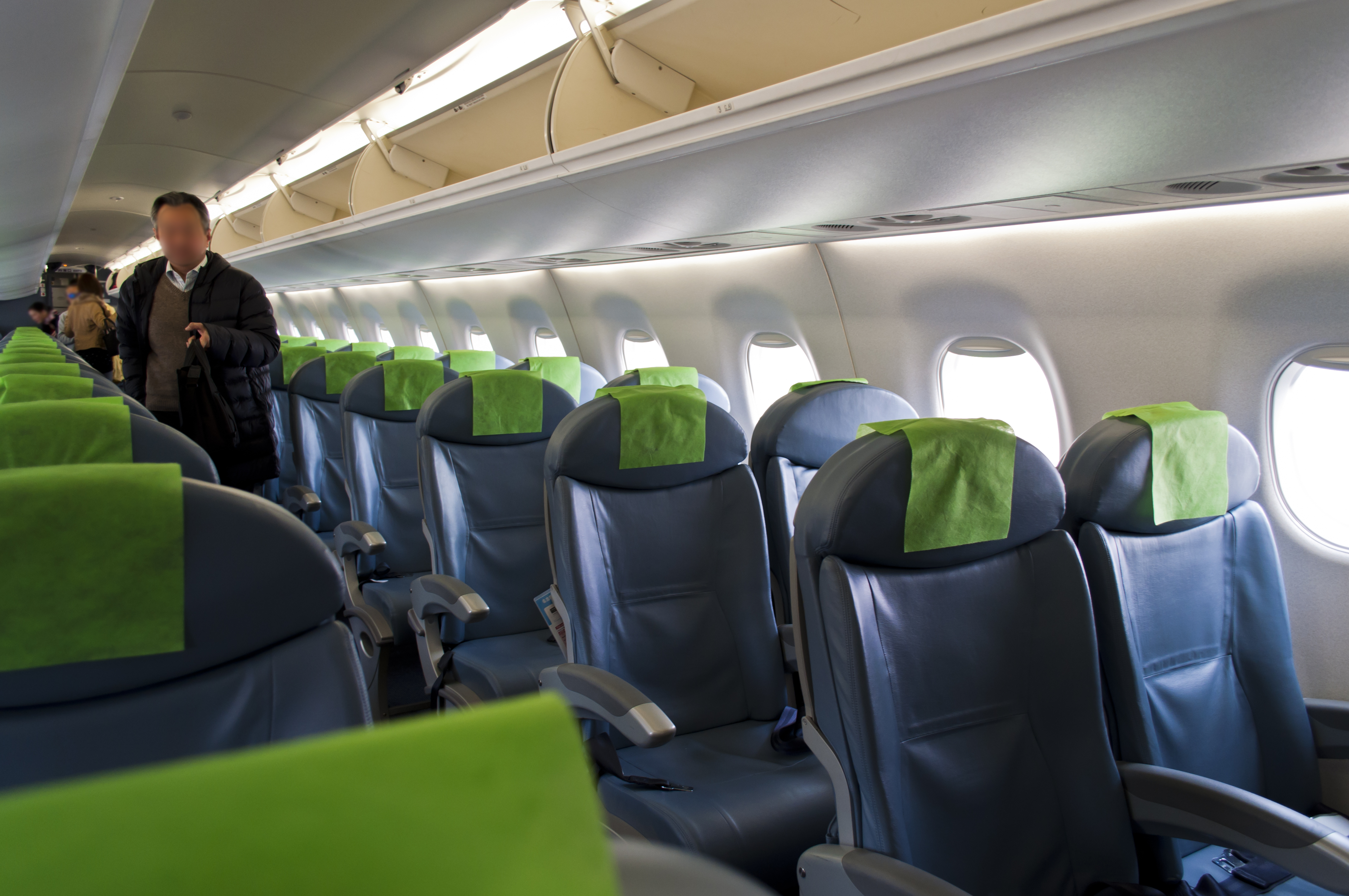
Cabin of a Fuji Dream Airlines E170

Fuji Dream Airlines' aircraft cabins consist of either 76 or 84 economy class seats, with each seat measuring approximately 18 inches (46 cm) wide with a standard seat pitch of 31 inches (79 cm). On the airline's flights, complimentary refreshment services are offered. The airline also has an in-flight magazine titled Dream 3776, with its name originating and derived from the airline's name and Mount Fuji's 3,776 m (12,388 ft) elevation.
