= 205th Tactical Fighter Squadron (JASDF) =

- 第205飛行隊
- Active: March 31, 1965
- Disbanded: June 30, 1981
- Country: Japan
- Branch: Japan Air Self-Defense Force
- Part of: Central Air Defense Force, 6th Air Wing
- Garrison/HQ: Komatsu Air Base

Aircraft flown
- Fighter: Lockheed F-104J/DJ

The 205th Tactical Fighter Squadron (第205飛行隊 (dai ni-hyaku-go hikoutai)) was a squadron of the 6th Air Wing of the Japan Air Self-Defense Force between 1965 and 1981. It was based at Komatsu Air Base, in Ishikawa Prefecture, Japan. It was equipped with Lockheed F-104J/DJ aircraft. Its traditions were passed on to the McDonnell Douglas F-4 Phantom II-equipped 306th Tactical Fighter Squadron.

== Aircraft operated ==
=== Fighter aircraft ===
- Lockheed F-104J/DJ (1965–1981)

== See also ==
- Fighter units of the Japan Air Self-Defense Force
