= Western Air Command Support Squadron (JASDF) =

- 西部航空方面隊司令部支援飛行隊
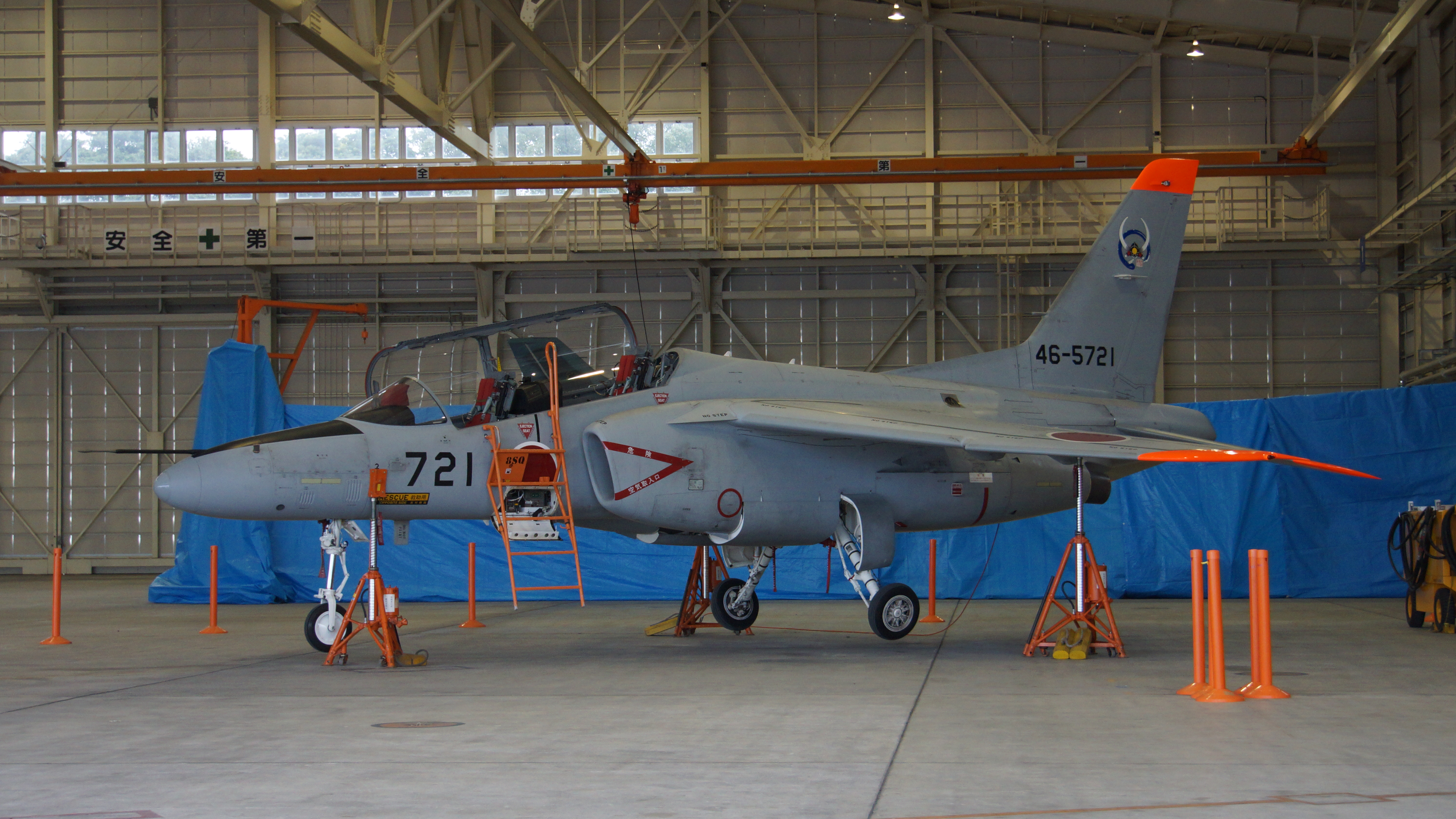
- Squadron Kawasaki T-4 (2017)
- Country: Japan
- Branch: Japan Air Self-Defense Force
- Part of: Western Air Defense Force
- Garrison/HQ: Kasuga Air Base (aircraft at Fukuoka Airport)

Aircraft flown
- Trainer: Kawasaki T-4

The Western Air Command Support Squadron (西部航空方面隊司令部支援飛行隊, seibu-kōkūhōmentai-shireibu-shien-hikō-tai) is a squadron of the Japan Air Self-Defense Force commanded from Kasuga Air Base in Fukuoka Prefecture. The actual aircraft are located at nearby Fukuoka Airport. Under the authority of the Western Air Defense Force, the squadron operates Kawasaki T-4 aircraft.
