= Kasuga Helicopter Airlift Squadron (JASDF) =

- 春日ヘリコプター空輸隊
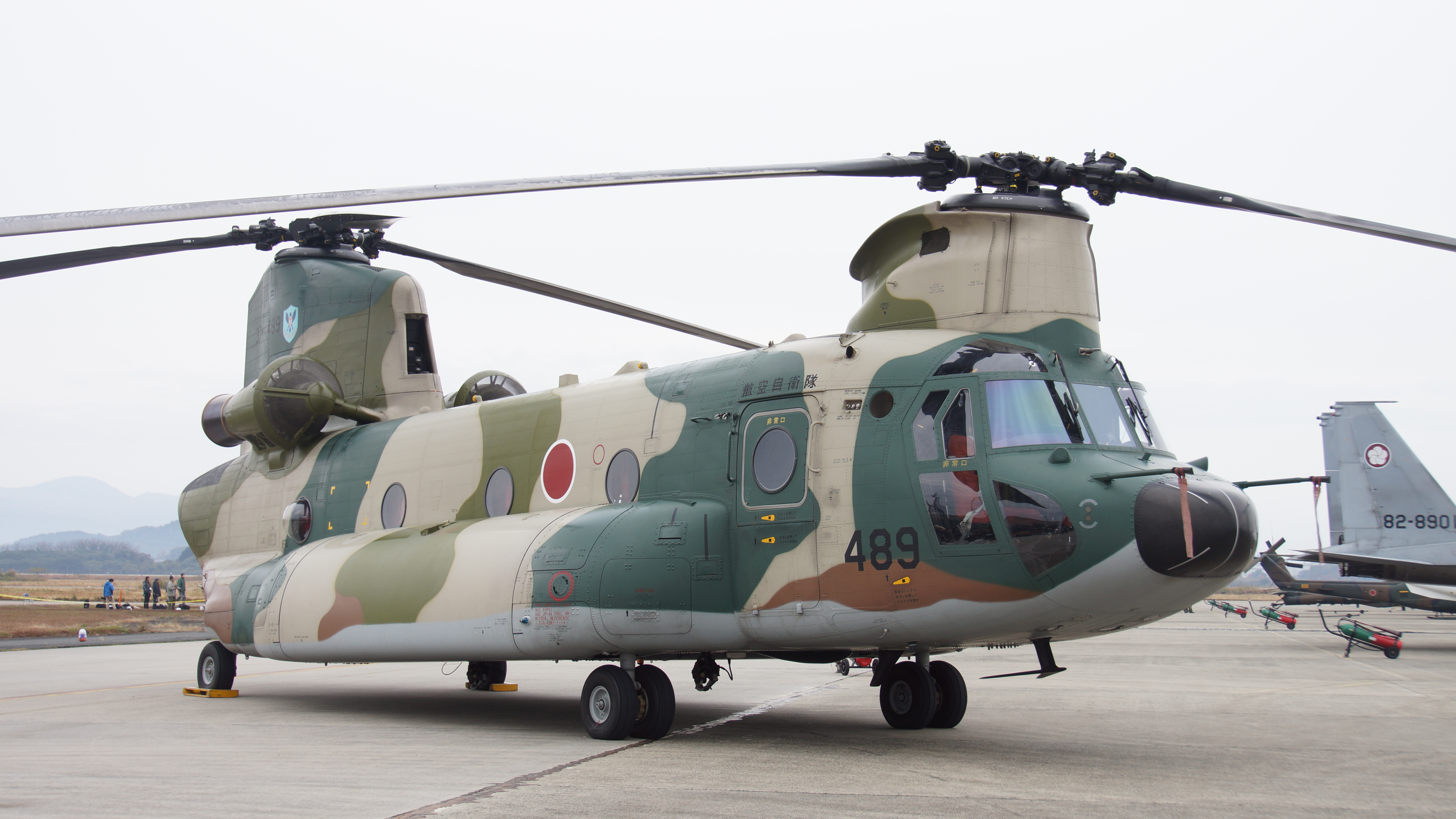
- Kasuga Squadron CH-47J
- Active: May 22, 1992-present
- Country: Japan
- Branch: Japan Air Self-Defense Force
- Part of: Air Rescue Wing
- Garrison/HQ: Kasuga Air Base (aircraft at Fukuoka Airport)

Aircraft flown
- Cargo helicopter: CH-47J

The Kasuga Helicopter Airlift Squadron (春日ヘリコプター空輸隊 (kasuga-herikoputa-kūyu-tai)) also known as the Kasuga Helicopter Transport Squadron is a unit of the Japan Air Self-Defense Force. It comes under the authority of the Air Rescue Wing. It is commanded from Kasuga Air Base in Fukuoka Prefecture, but its aircraft are actually based at the nearby Fukuoka Airport. It is equipped with CH-47J aircraft.

== Tail marking ==
As with other helicopter airlift squadrons, it has the emblem of the Air Rescue Wing with a sticker stating the home base of the unit.

== Aircraft operated ==
- CH-47J
