= 306th Tactical Fighter Squadron (JASDF) =

- 第306飛行隊
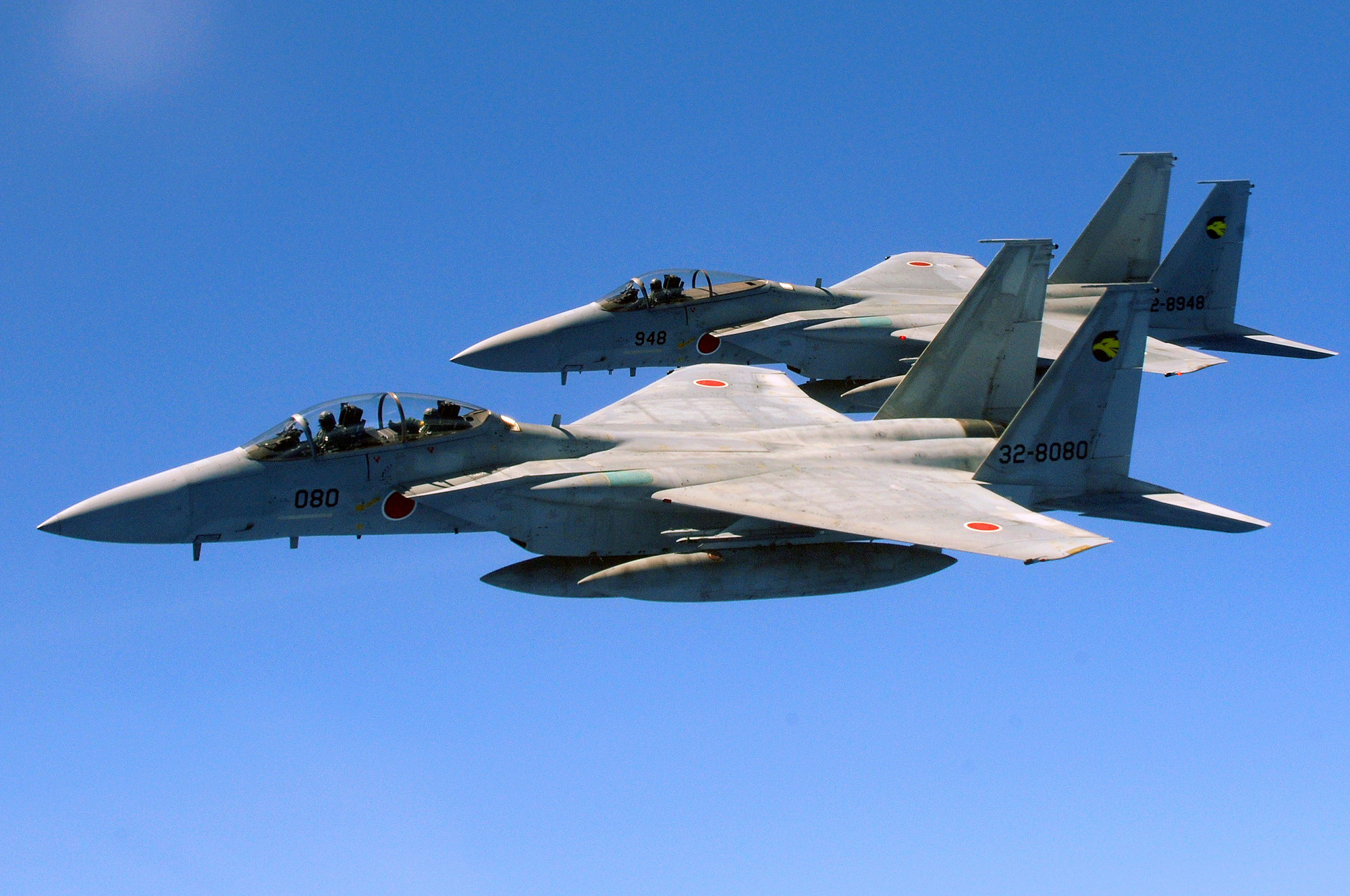
- 306 Squadron Mitsubishi F-15s (2009)
- Active: June 30, 1981–present
- Country: Japan
- Branch: Japan Air Self-Defense Force
- Part of: Central Air Defense Force, 6th Air Wing
- Garrison/HQ: Komatsu Air Base

Aircraft flown
- Fighter: Mitsubishi F-15J/DJ
- Trainer: Kawasaki T-4

The 306th Tactical Fighter Squadron (第306飛行隊 (dai-sann-byaku-roku-hikoutai)) is a squadron of the 6th Air Wing of the Japan Air Self-Defense Force (JASDF) based at Komatsu Air Base, in Ishikawa Prefecture, Japan. It is equipped with Mitsubishi F-15J/DJ and Kawasaki T-4 aircraft.

== History ==
The 306th Tactical Fighter Squadron was founded on at Hyakuri Air Base on December 1, 1981 with F-4EJ aircraft. The squadron was the successor to the Lockheed F-104J/DJ Starfighter-equipped 205th Tactical Fighter Squadron. It was the sixth and final squadron of the JASDF to be equipped with the F-4. One of the aircraft (17–8440) was the last of the 5,195 F-4 Phantoms to be produced. It was manufactured by Mitsubishi Heavy Industries on May 21, 1981. "The Final Phantom" later transferred to the 301st Tactical Fighter Squadron. In 1989 the squadron's aircraft were upgraded to F-4EJ Kai standard. In 1997 it converted from the F-4 and became the eighth and final of the F-15J squadrons existing at that time.

The squadron has participated in overseas exercises with US and other forces. 306th squadron aircraft have taken part in the Red Flag - Alaska exercise at Eielson Air Force Base in the United States on a number of occasions, including 2012–2, 2013-3, and 2015-3. It also participated in Cope North including in 1986, 2015 and 2016.

In July 2018 aircraft of the squadron trained in Japanese airspace with US B-52 bombers.

== Tail marking ==
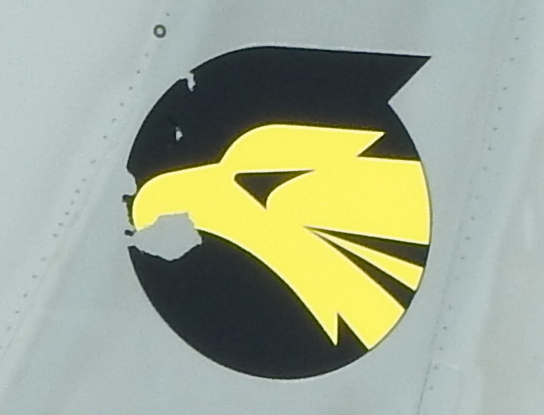
Tail marking (2016)

The squadron's aircraft carry a golden eagle as their tail marking, inside a stylized "6" indicating the 6th Air Wing. The golden eagle can be found in the mountains near Komatsu air base, and is also the prefectural bird of Ishikawa.

== Aircraft operated ==
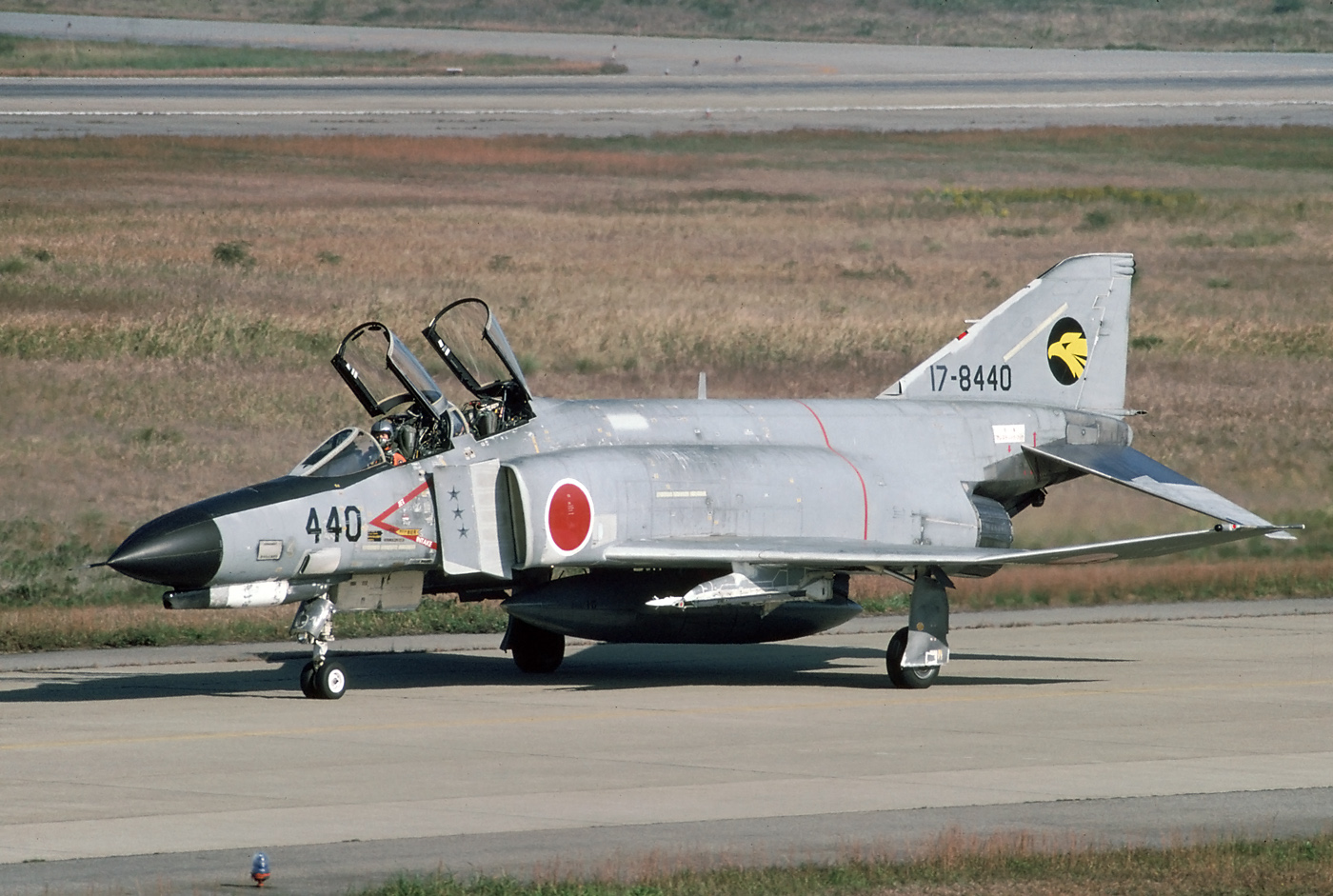
F-4EJ Kai. This aircraft was the very last of the 5,195 F-4s produced worldwide (1994)

=== Fighter aircraft ===
- McDonnell Douglas F-4EJ (1981–1989)
- McDonnell Douglas F-4EJ Kai (1989–1997)
- Mitsubishi F-15J (1997–present)

=== Liaison aircraft ===
- Lockheed T-33A (1981–1994)
- Kawasaki T-4 (1992–present)

== See also ==
- Fighter units of the Japan Air Self-Defense Force
