= Kasuga Air Base =

Coordinates: 33°31′53″N 130°28′00″E

Kasuga Air Base
- Kasuga, Fukuoka, Japan
- Kasuga Air Base, operating center of air defense over the western part of Japan

Site information
- Type: Air force base
- Controlled by: Japan Air Self-Defense Force

Site history
- Built: 1959

Garrison information
- Current commander: Commander, Western Aircraft Control and Warning Wing
- Garrison: Western Air Defense Force (WADF); Kasuga Helicopter Airlift Squadron

Kasuga Air Base (春日基地, kasuga-kichi) is a base of the Japan Air Self-Defense Force in Kasuga, Fukuoka Prefecture, Japan. The base serves as the headquarter of Western Air Defense Force (WADF), with its Area of Responsibility encompassing Kyushu, Shikoku and the Chūgoku region on the western part of the country. A hotline connecting Kasuga Air Base and Daegu (Taegu) Air Base in South Korea is also established, through which communications between the two countries are carried out several dozen times a day.

== Tenant squadrons ==
The base lacks a runway or dedicated helicopter landing facilities, so flying units commanded from here are actually located at the nearby Fukuoka Airport.

- Western Air Command Support Squadron (Kawasaki T-4)
- Kasuga Helicopter Airlift Squadron (CH-47J)
