= Matsumoto Airport =

Matsumoto Airport Shinshu-Matsumoto Airport
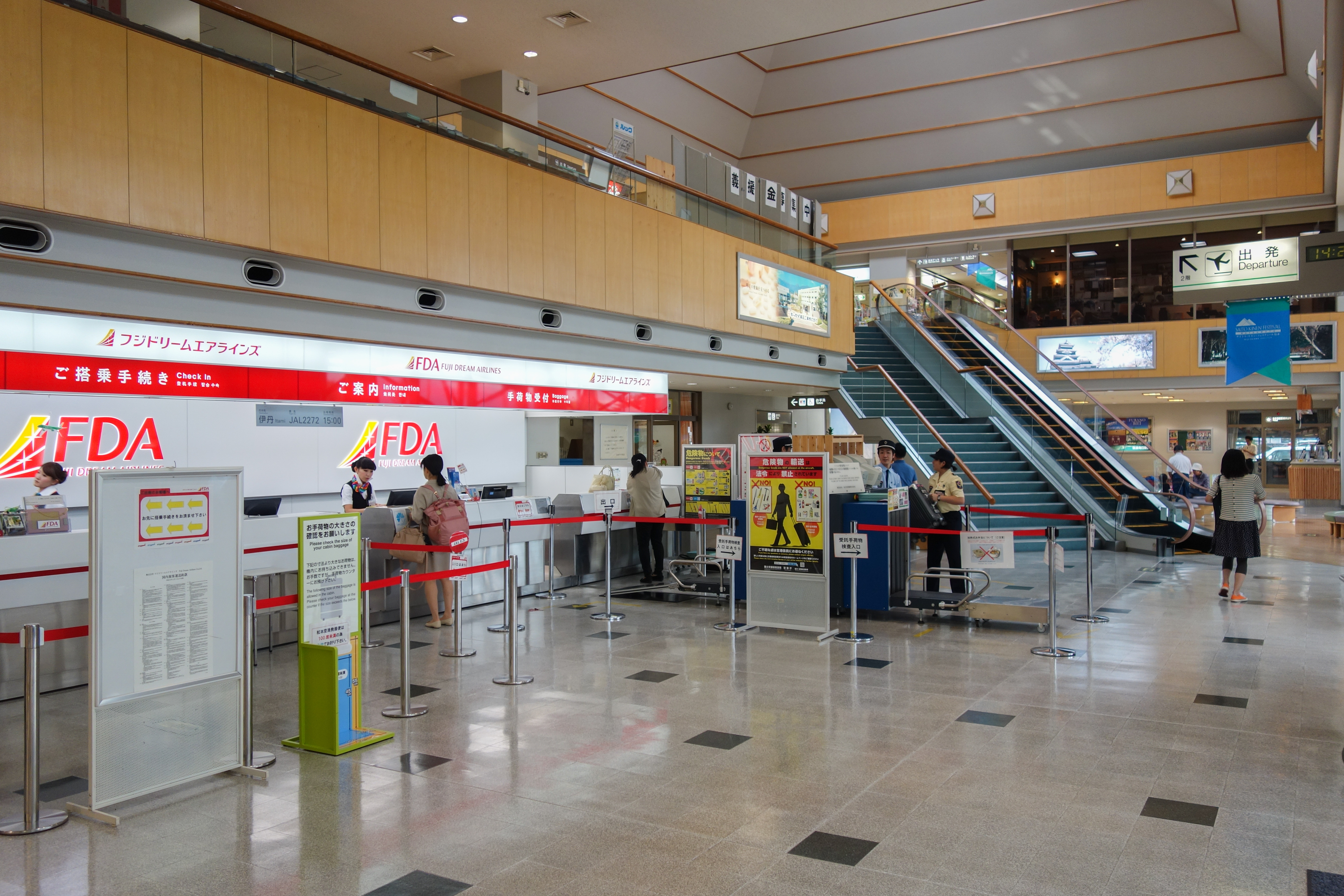
- IATA: MMJ; ICAO: RJAF

Summary
- Airport type: Public
- Operator: Nagano Prefecture
- Serves: Matsumoto and Shiojiri, Nagano
- Location: Matsumoto, Japan
- Elevation AMSL: 2,157 ft / 657 m
- Coordinates: 36°10′00″N 137°55′22″E
- Website: Official website

Map
- Location in Nagano Prefecture Location in Japan

Runways
Direction	Length		Surface
Direction	m	ft	Surface
18/36	2,000	6,562	Asphalt concrete

Statistics (2015)
- Passengers: 112,618
- Cargo (metric tonnes): 0
- Aircraft movement: 7,146
- Source: Japanese Ministry of Land, Infrastructure, Transport and Tourism

Matsumoto Airport (松本空港, Matsumoto Kūkō) (IATA: MMJ, ICAO: RJAF), also known as Shinshu-Matsumoto Airport, is an airport located 5 NM (9.3 km; 5.8 mi) southwest of central Matsumoto, Nagano Prefecture, Japan.

Opened on July 16, 1965, Matsumoto Airport is located approximately 9 kilometers southwest of the center of Matsumoto city, straddling the border between Matsumoto and the city of Shiojiri, Nagano. The airport is located roughly in the center of Nagano Prefecture. Regularly scheduled flights are for domestic service only. It is located at the highest elevation (657.5 m) of any commercial airport in Japan, and is surrounded by high mountains, which impose restrictions on the type of aircraft which can service the destination. The runway was lengthened to 2000 meters in 1994 to accommodate jet aircraft, and a new passenger terminal building started operation.

In the past, the airport was served by Japan Air System, mostly using MD-87 aircraft before being integrated into JAL. In FY 2013 its load factors passed 70% for the first time since its expansion. The airport and surrounding region cater to mountaineers during summer months and to skiers during winter months. Japan Airlines operated regular service to Osaka until 2010. However, since recovering from bankruptcy, Japan Airlines has resumed seasonal service to Matsumoto Airport from Osaka Itami Airport using the Embraer E170 aircraft. Other airlines from Korea, Russia and China occasionally fly charter flights to Matsumoto.

The 2013 television movie, Big Airport 2013 (大空港2013) was set at the airport. The movie features Teruyuki Kagawa and was directed by Kōki Mitani.

== Airlines and destinations ==
Airlines	Destinations
Fuji Dream Airlines	Fukuoka, Kobe, Sapporo–Chitose
Japan Airlines	Seasonal: Osaka–Itami
