= Shizuoka Airport =

Airport in Makinohara and Shimada, Shizuoka Prefecture, Japan

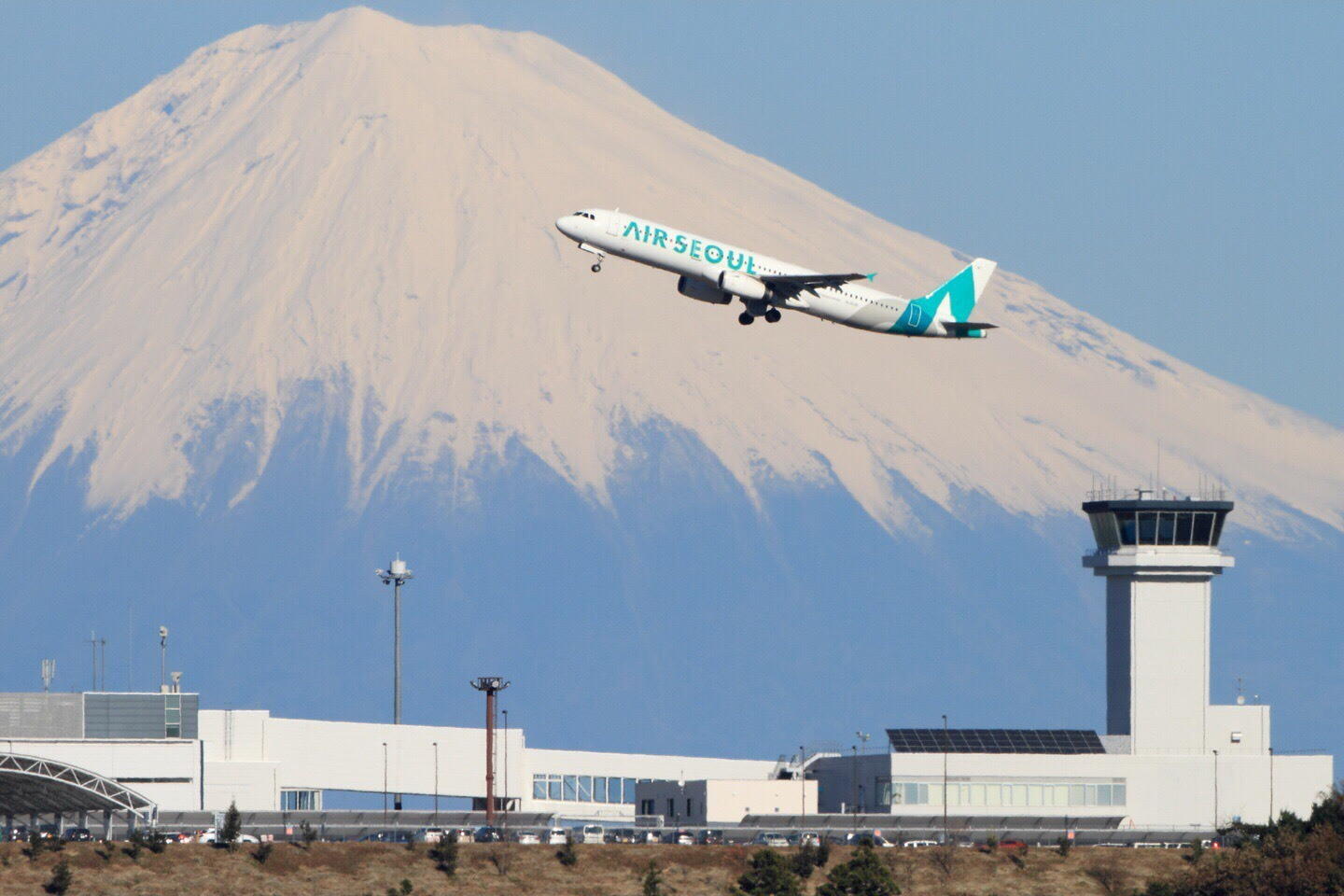
- IATA: FSZ; ICAO: RJNS

Summary
- Airport type: Public
- Owner: Shizuoka Prefecture
- Operator: Mt. Fuji Shizuoka Airport
- Serves: Hamamatsu and Shizuoka
- Location: Makinohara and Shimada, Shizuoka Prefecture, Japan
- Opened: June 4, 2009; 17 years ago
- Operating base for: Fuji Dream Airlines
- Elevation AMSL: 433 ft (132 m)
- Coordinates: 34°47′46″N 138°11′22″E
- Website: www.mtfuji-shizuokaairport.jp

Map
- Location in Shizuoka Prefecture Location in Japan

Runways
Direction	Length		Surface
Direction	m	ft	Surface
12/30	2,500	8,202	Asphalt

Statistics (2015)
- Passengers: 699,276
- Cargo (metric tonnes): 371
- Aircraft movement: 9,689
- Source: Japanese Ministry of Land, Infrastructure, Transport and Tourism

Shizuoka Airport (静岡空港, Shizuoka Kūkō) (IATA: FSZ, ICAO: RJNS), also called Mt. Fuji Shizuoka Airport, is an international airport located in Shizuoka Prefecture, Japan. Opened on 4 June 2009, the airport has domestic service to Sapporo, Fukuoka, Naha (Okinawa), Komatsu, Kumamoto, and Kagoshima. International routes connect it to Ningbo, Seoul, Taipei, and Shanghai.

The airport is located in Makinohara and Shimada. It is 27 km (17 mi) southwest of Shizuoka Station and about 45 km (28 mi) from Hamamatsu, 80 km (50 mi) from Mount Fuji, 130 km (81 mi) from Nagoya, and 175 km (109 mi) from Tokyo in a direct line.

== History ==
To allow for growth in air travel to Shizuoka, Hamamatsu, and the Mount Fuji area, and to fill the gap between Tokyo and Nagoya airports, Shizuoka Prefecture bought 190 hectares (470 acres) of land for Shizuoka Airport. One reason for building this airport in this particular location is that locals and tourists will not have to rely on the severely congested airports of the Tokyo region. Any flights that bypass the Tokyo region will help overall air traffic, including direct international flights. Like Kobe Airport, Shizuoka Airport has come under criticism as Nagoya's Chubu Centrair International Airport is not congested and is also in an expansion phase.

The airport was originally scheduled to open in March 2009, but was delayed by the shortening of the runway from 2,500 m (8,202 ft) to 2,200 m (7,218 ft), by the use of a displaced threshold that cannot be used for landing, due to environmental and noise concerns.

== Airlines and destinations ==
Airlines	Destinations
Air Busan	Busan
Fuji Dream Airlines	Fukuoka, Kagoshima, Sapporo–Chitose
Jeju Air	Seoul–Incheon
VietJet Air	Hanoi

== Access ==
=== Bus Stop No. 1 ===
Bus stop	No	Time（minutes）	Via	Destination	Company
1	Kawaguchiko Line	180	Gotemba Station・Fuji-Q Highland	Kawaguchiko Station	Fujikyu bus
1	Fujiedashi Access Bus	35	Non stop	Fujieda Station	Shizutetsu justline
1	Shibuya Liner	250	Gotemba Station	Shibuya Station	Tokyu bus

=== Fuji Dream Airlines Access Bus ===
Bus stop	No	Time（minutes）	Via	Destination	Company
2	Access Bus (Free)	30	Non stop	Kakegawa Station	FDA

=== Bus Stop No. 3 ===
Bus stop	No	Time（minutes）	Via	Destination	Company
3	Fujisan Shizuokakūkō - Shizuoka Line (A-1)	54	Shizuoka Station	Shin-Shizuoka Station	Shizutetsu justline

=== Bus Stop No. 4 ===
Bus stop	No	Time（minutes）	Via	Destination	Company
4	Fujisan Shizuoka kūkō-Shimada Line (A-3)	25	Non stop	Shimada Station	Shizutetsu justline
4	Kanaya・SL Shin-Kanaya Line	18	Kanaya Station	Shin-Kanaya Station	Daitetsu Advance

=== Other ===
Free parking for 2,000 cars is available at the airport.

=== Railway ===
The closest railway station is Kanaya Station on the Tōkaidō Main Line and the Ōigawa Main Line. It is about 6 km from the airport. Taxi service to Shizuoka Station, a major station in the area, is available for 8,500 yen.

While the Tokaido Shinkansen line travels directly underneath the airport, there is no train station nor have any plans been made to build one. Although no plans are currently in place, Shizuoka Prefecture has prepared a feasibility study on this matter, and both parties will continue negotiations on this issue.
