= Fukuoka Airport =

Airport serving Fukuoka–Kitakyushu, Japan

Fukuoka Airport 福岡空港

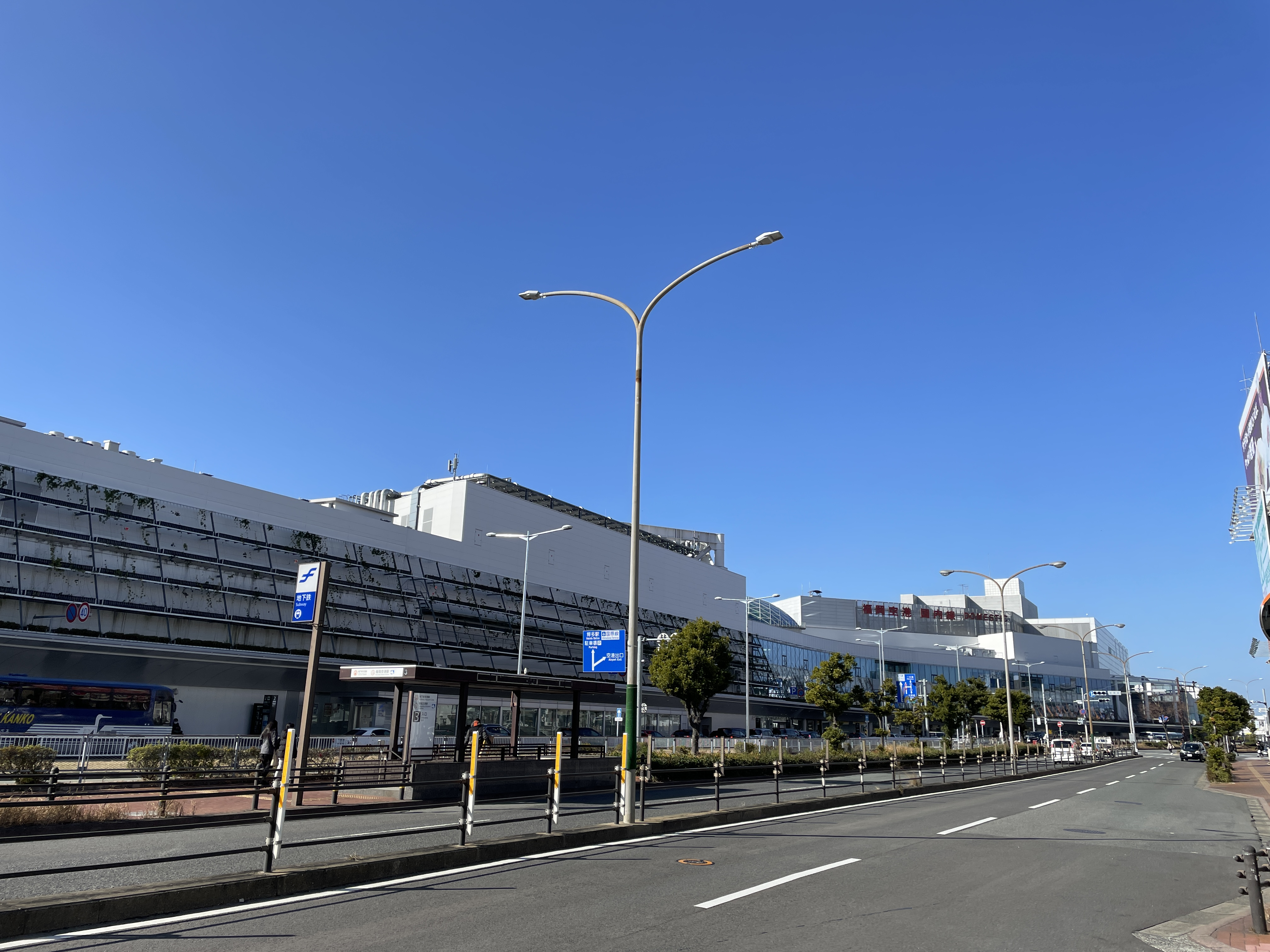
- IATA: FUK; ICAO: RJFF

Summary
- Airport type: Public / military
- Owner/Operator: Fukuoka International Airport Co.
- Serves: Fukuoka–Kitakyushu
- Location: Hakata-ku, Fukuoka, Fukuoka Prefecture, Japan
- Opened: 1944; 82 years ago
- Focus city for: All Nippon Airways; Japan Airlines
- Operating base for: Skymark Airlines
- Elevation AMSL: 30 ft (9.1 m)
- Coordinates: 33°35′04″N 130°27′06″E
- Website: www.fukuoka-airport.jp

Map
- Location in Fukuoka Location in Fukuoka Prefecture Location in Japan

Runways
Direction	Length		Surface
Direction	m	ft	Surface
16L/34R	2,800	9,186	Asphalt/concrete
16R/34L	2,500	8,202	Asphalt/concrete

Statistics (2024)
- Passengers: 26,765,836
- Cargo (metric tonnes): 153,126
- Aircraft movements: 186,000
- Source: Fukuoka International Airport Co. Centre for Aviation

Fukuoka Airport (Japanese: 福岡空港, Hepburn: Fukuoka Kūkō; IATA: FUK, ICAO: RJFF), formerly known as Itazuke Air Base, is an international airport located 1.6 nautical miles (3.0 km; 1.8 mi) east of Hakata Station in Hakata-ku, Fukuoka, Japan. The facility has two runways and covers 345 hectares (853 acres) of land.

Fukuoka Airport is the principal airport on the island of Kyushu and is the fourth busiest passenger airport in Japan, serving 25 million passengers in 2018. Due to its proximity to several residential areas, the airport is subject to a mandatory late night curfew from 22:00 every night to 07:00 the following morning, at the request of local residents.

The domestic terminal boasts extensive facilities, but the international terminal is located on the other side of the runway. The domestic terminal is connected to the city by the Fukuoka City Subway, and a subway from the airport to the business district takes about ten minutes. The international terminal is only accessible by road, although there is scheduled inter-terminal airport bus to the domestic terminal and the subway station, and scheduled bus service to Hakata Station and the Tenjin area.

As for access to the Fukuoka area, there are airports such as Saga Airport and Kitakyushu Airport, built on an artificial island and therefore open 24 hours a day, as alternatives to Fukuoka Airport, which is chronically congested.

Fukuoka Airport aggressively built a second runway and expanding two terminals in an effort to ease congestion. The second runway officially opened on March 20, 2025.

Fukuoka Airport is ranked 26th in Skytrax's World's Top 100 Airports for 2024 and the 2nd in the World's Best Regional Airports.

== History ==
The airport was built in 1944 by the Imperial Japanese Army Air Force as Mushiroda Airfield. After the war, the United States Air Force used the airfield as Itazuke Air Base from 1945 to 1972. Itazuke actually comprised three installations: Itazuke AB, Itazuke (Kasuga) Administration Annex and Brady Air Base (Camp Brady). Itazuke and the Kasuga Annex were on the mainland while Brady was in Saitozaki, on the peninsula (Umi no Nakamichi) that forms Hakata Bay. Part of the confusion with the names stem from the days when the annex and Brady AB were Army installations before the USAF took command in 1956.

At its height, Itazuke AB was the largest USAF base on Kyūshū, but was closed in 1972 due to budget reductions and the overall reduction of United States military forces in Japan.

=== Japanese military base ===
Mushiroda was constructed in 1943 by American and Allied POWs on former rice farmland. Initially used by trainer aircraft, the airfield soon became unsuitable due to the high water levels of the old rice fields, as frequent rains flooded the runway, making it unsafe for inexperienced pilots.

The Japanese Air Force's 6th Fighter Wing replaced the trainers and Mushiroda became an air defense base. The 6th Wing had 30 single engine fighters and several reconnaissance aircraft to patrol the Okinawa-Kyūshū aerial invasion corridor. In April 1945, the Tachiarai Army Airfield near Kurume was destroyed by American B-29s. Tachiarai's bomber aircraft were moved to Mushiroda and the base became very active until late in the war when B-29s attacked the airfield and destroyed most of the Imperial Japanese forces stationed here.

=== Postwar era ===
The first American units moved into the facility in November 1945, when the 38th Bombardment Group stationed North American B-25 Mitchells on the airfield. Moving to Itazuke from Yontan Airfield, Okinawa, the mission of the 38th Bomb Group was to fly daily surveillance missions to monitor shipping traffic between Kyūshū and Korea in order to interdict smuggling of illegal Korean immigrants and goods. Along with the 38th, the 8th Fighter Group was assigned to the airfield on 1 April 1946 which performed occupation duties until April 1947. Due to the massive destruction of the facility during the War, the only available buildings to house personnel was the Kyūshū Airplane Company's complex in Zasshonokuma. Designated Base Two, the former aircraft company was converted to barracks, dining halls, a post exchange, and BOQ. Additional facilities and billets were housed in a tent city at the airfield.

The 38th Bomb Group remained at Itazuke until October 1946 also during which time several reconstruction units worked on the former IJAAF base rebuilding and constructing new facilities. Headquarters, 315th Bombardment Wing moved into the base during May 1946, spending most of the postwar occupation years at the new American Air Force base.

When the 38th Bomb Group moved to Itami Airfield, it was replaced by the P-61 Black Widow-equipped 347th Fighter Group that moved from Nagoya Airfield. The 347th's mission was to provide air defense of Japanese airspace with the long range former night fighter. the 347th Fighter Wing, All Weather, was established at Itazuke in August 1948 when the unit was reformed under the new United States Air Force "Base-Wing" reorganization. The 347th moved to Bofu Air Base in October. It was replaced by the 475th Fighter Wing which brought with it the new F-82 Twin Mustangs, replacing the wartime Black Widows for air defense missions. Once up to full strength, it was moved to Ashiya Airfield in March 1949.

By early 1949, reconstruction of Itazuke was complete along the construction of long jet runways. The 8th Fighter Wing moved in during March with the F-80C Shooting Star jet, which provided air interceptor defense of Japan.

=== Korean War ===
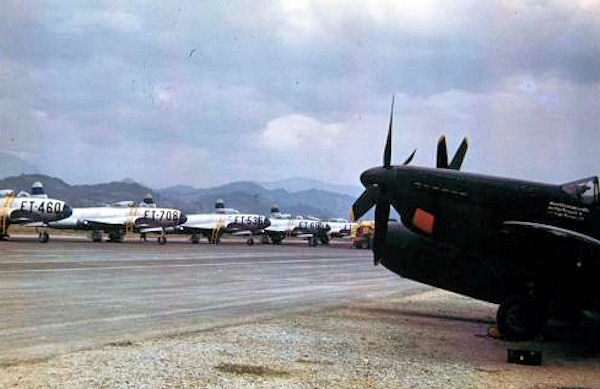
The flightline at Itazuke Air Base, Japan, 1950. The F-82 in the foreground belongs to the 69th All Weather Fighter Squadron, and the F-80s are assigned to the eighth Fighter-Bomber Group.

Itazuke played a key role in the Korean War and the defense of the Pusan perimeter in 1950.

On 25 June 1950, North Korea invaded South Korea, starting a war that would last three years. Being the closest USAF base to the Korean Peninsula, the 8th Fighter Wing at Itazuke initially provided air cover for the evacuation of Americans from Korea on 26 June, the day after the invasion. In these early operations, Itazuke Air Base supported F-80C Shooting Star jet fighters of the 8th Fighter Wing, along with propeller driven aircraft such as the F-82C Twin Mustangs of the 68th Fighter Squadron, All Weather, and P-51D Mustangs which were shipped from the United States for ground support missions in South Korea. The first aerial victory of the Korean War went to 1Lt William G. Hudson, of the 68th Fighter Squadron, All Weather in an F-82.

During the Korean War, Itazuke was a major combat airfield for the USAF. The 8th Fighter Wing moved to a forward base in South Korea in late Fall of 1950. With the move, the support element that remained at Itazuke was redesignated the 6160th Air Base Wing. The USAF moved several of its combat units to the base for operations over Korea, these being the 49th Fighter Group, the 58th Fighter-Bomber Wing; the 51st Fighter-Interceptor Wing; the 452d Bombardment Wing; the 27th Fighter-Escort Wing and the Texas Air National Guard 136th Fighter Group. A wide variety of aircraft operated from the airfield from twin-engined B-26 Invader tactical bombers, F-80 Shooting Stars, F-84 Thunderjets, F-82 Twin Mustangs and F-94 Starfire jet interceptors.

=== Cold War ===
After the 1953 Armistice in Korea, the wartime combat units were slowly withdrawn back to the United States or reassigned to other airfields in Japan and South Korea. The base settled down to another era of peace to become the key base in the defense of Western Japan. The 8th Fighter Wing returned to Itazuke from its forward airfield at Suwon AB (K-13), South Korea in October 1954, being the host unit at the base for the next ten years.

During the 1950s, the 8 FW flew the F-86 Sabre for air defense of Japan and South Korea, being upgraded to the new F-100 Super Sabre in 1956. In 1961 the wing received Air Defense Command F-102 Delta Daggers, specifically designed for the air defense mission.

The 8 TFW was reassigned back to the United States in July 1964 to George AFB, California where it was equipped with the new F-4C Phantom II and eventually became a major USAF combat wing in Thailand during the Vietnam War. With the departure of the 8 TFW, the 348th Combat Support Group became the host unit at Itazuke, with the Pacific Air Forces 41st Air Division becoming the operational USAF unit at the base. During the 1960s and numerous rotational units from the United States deployed to the base. The F-105 Thunderchief-equipped 35th Tactical Fighter Squadron was the major flying organization until 1968, when it was moved to Thailand for combat operations over North Vietnam during the Vietnam War. During the Vietnam War, a detachment of the 552d Airborne Early Warning and Control Wing which operated C-121 Constellation AWACS aircraft operated from Itazuke, but the stable situation in South Korea led to the gradual phase down of the base and personnel were withdrawn for other duties.

On 2 June 1968, at 10:48pm, a USAF RF-4C Phantom jet, traveling from Okinawa to Itazuke, experienced engine trouble, and after the two crew members safely ejected, the jet crashed into the Large Computer Center building of the Hakozaki Campus of Kyushu University, located in the East Ward of Fukuoka City. The building was still under construction, so there were no casualties on the ground. Occurring as it did at the start of the 1968–1969 Japanese university protests, the crash helped ignite large-scale demonstrations at the university, and students refused to allow authorities to remove the wreckage of the plane, which was hanging from the building. The early demonstrations included participation by the university president and faculty, calling for American military to be removed from the Itazuke Base, claiming that its presence in an urban area was a danger. At a 20 June Japan-U.S. Joint Committee meeting, the Japanese representatives proposed that the Itazuke Airfield be relocated, and the American representatives stated that it would consider moving to an alternative site. In time New Left student groups at Kyushu University took the demonstrations in more radical directions, building barricades on campus, fighting with each other, and disrupting or cancelling classes, the graduation ceremony, and entrance examinations. The wreckage of the Phantom jet was lowered from the building on 5 January 1969, and finally removed from the campus and returned to American authorities on 14 October 1969, when riot police entered the campus and tore down the barricades.

In 1970 it was announced that Itazuke would be returned to Japanese control, and the USAF facilities were severely reduced on 31 March 1972. However, since then the USAF retains a small facility on the airport grounds, staffed by U.S. Air Force Air Mobility Command personnel. It is the only civilian airport in Japan that is a dedicated U.S. military zone, with warehouses, refueling facilities, and a terminal for the movement of U.S. military personnel and diplomats. In addition, the airport's runways, taxiways, and some parking areas are designated as a Japan-U.S. Joint Use Area. Although there is no permanent aircraft unit, transport aircraft and other aircraft belonging to the Air Mobility Command fly in on a regular weekly basis, and Navy aircraft and other aircraft also use the airport.

=== Civilian usage ===
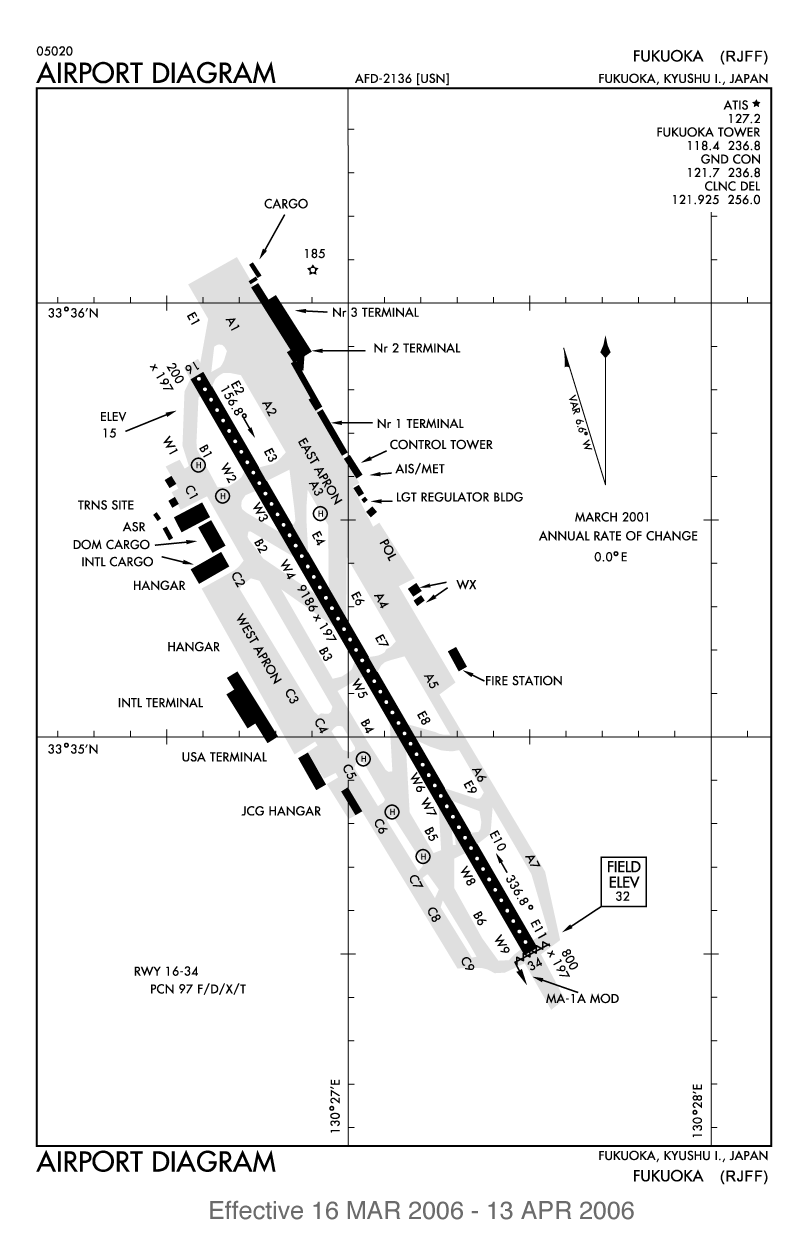
Airport diagram (before 2nd runway construction)

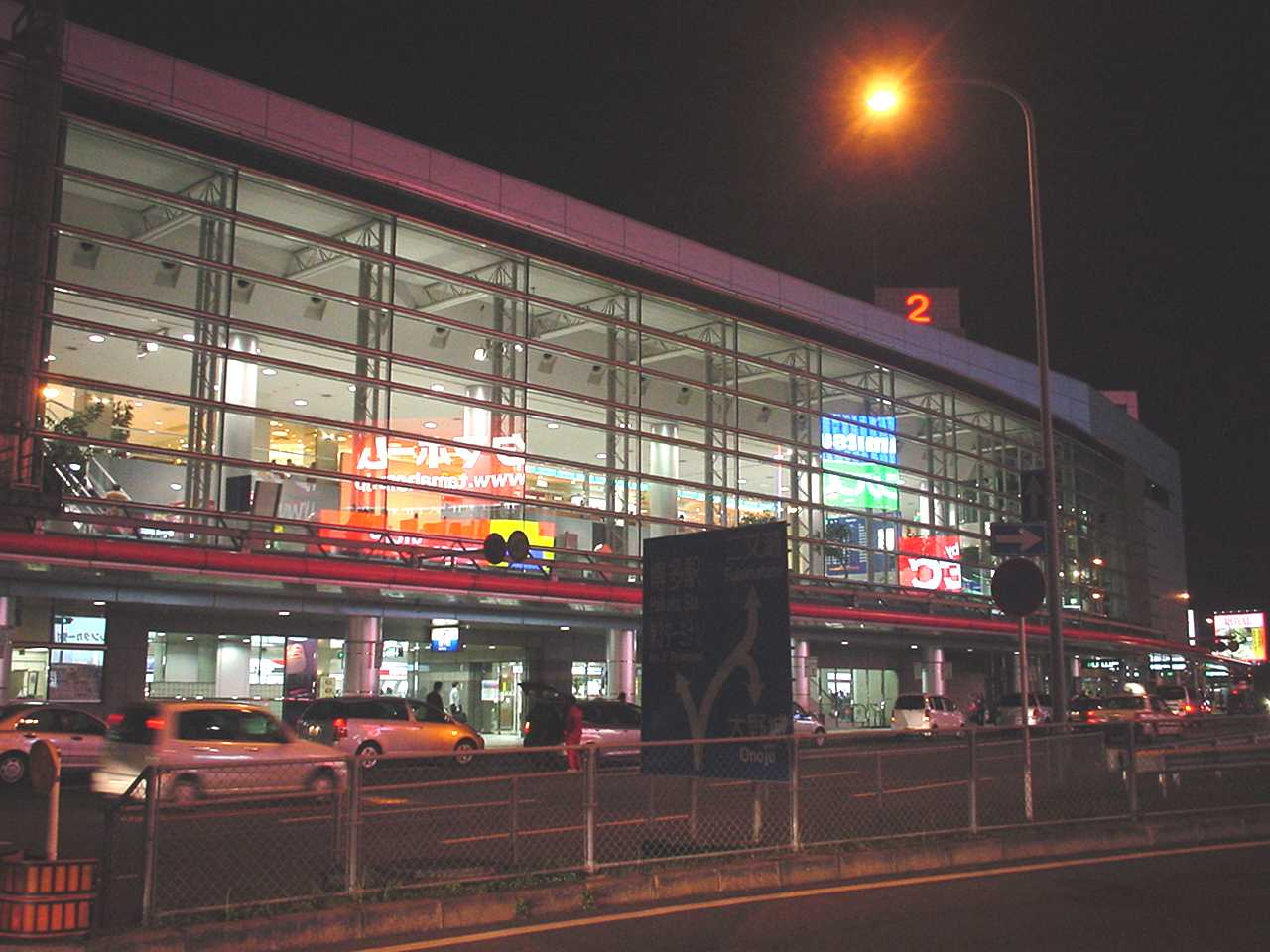
Fukuoka Airport terminal 2 at night

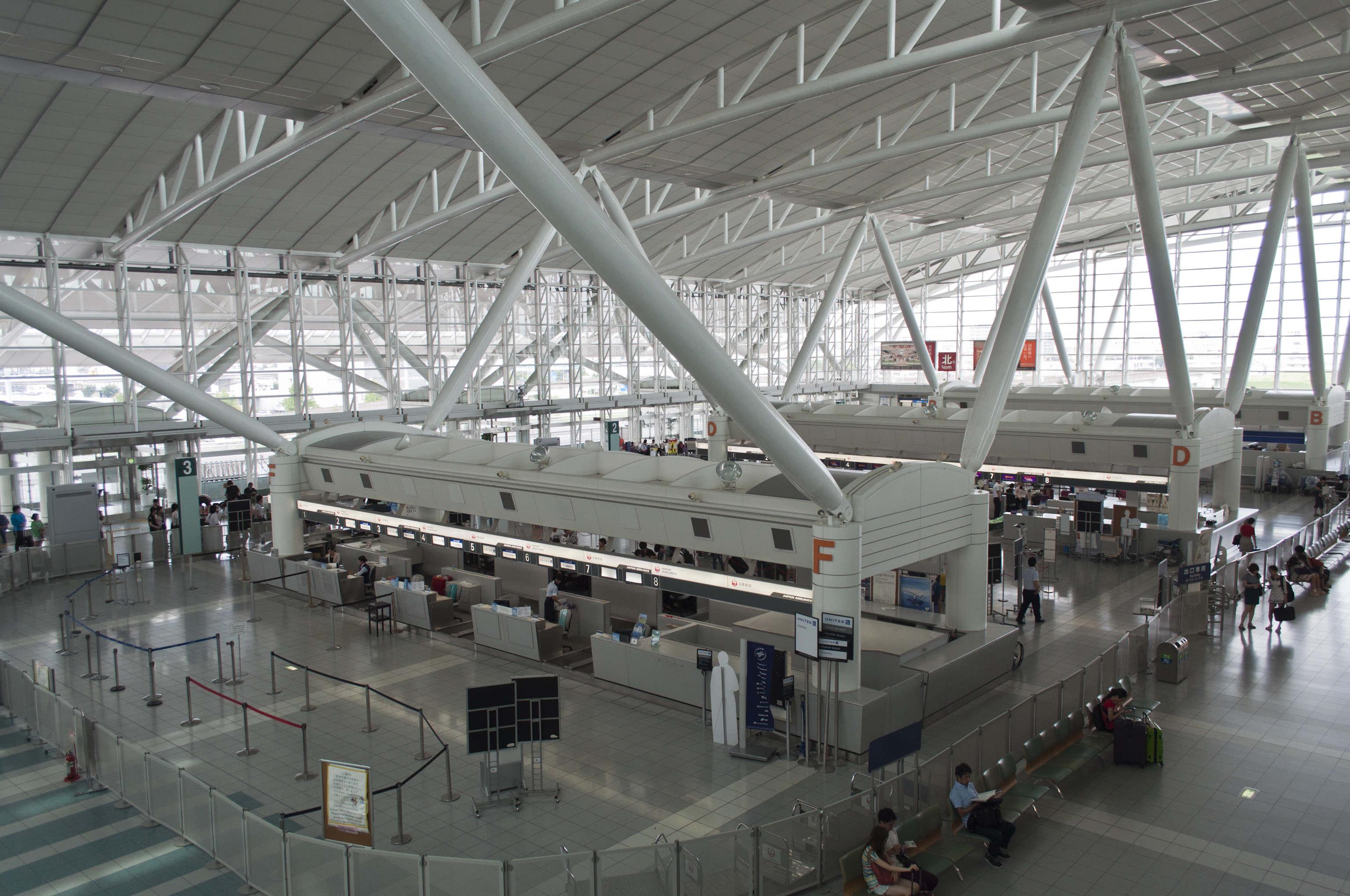
International terminal departure floor

Fukuoka's first civilian air service was Japan Airlines' Fukuoka-Osaka-Tokyo service, which commenced in 1951. JAL introduced jet service on the Fukuoka-Tokyo route in 1961. The airport's first international service was to nearby Busan, South Korea, beginning in 1965. Air Siam and Air France both began long-haul service to Fukuoka in 1975, but withdrew within two years.

In October 1998, Delta Air Lines started a non-stop flight between Fukuoka and its transpacific hub in Portland using a McDonnell Douglas MD-11. It dropped the route the following September due to a decline in the Japanese economy. Japan Airlines operated flights from Fukuoka to Hawaii until withdrawing in 2005. Delta launched service to Honolulu in 2011, which was successful beyond expectations, particularly due to the opening of the Kyushu Shinkansen which made it a convenient resort route offering for passengers from throughout Kyushu. This led to an increase of Delta's frequencies in 2012, as well as Hawaiian Airlines offering a daily Fukuoka-Honolulu service.

In April 2013, KLM inaugurated a flight to Amsterdam aboard a Boeing 777. This was the first direct service between Fukuoka and Europe. KLM discontinued it in January 2016. Four months later, Finnair introduced seasonal flights to Helsinki. The airline utilized Airbus A330s on the route. The last flight took off in 2019; Finnair suspended the link due to the COVID-19 pandemic and the closure of Russian airspace to the airline after invading Ukraine.

== Future developments ==
Although Fukuoka is known as one of the most convenient airports in Japan, it is constrained both by its inner-city location and by its single runway. The International Terminal was opened in 1999. Operations at the airport began to exceed its capacity of 145,000 annual flights in 2012, the year in which several new low-cost carriers began operation. The Japan Civil Aviation Bureau has announced that Fukuoka will be designated as a "congested airport" (IATA Level 3) from late March 2016, meaning that the airport will be subject to slot restrictions and operators will have to receive five-year permits from JCAB in order to operate at FUK.

With Fukuoka's ambitions to become a hub for business and travel in East Asia, moving the airport further inland or to an offshore artificial island to accommodate increased traffic has been considered. However, the idea of a new airport in the sea off Shingu has been opposed by environmentalists. The Gan-no-su coastal area has also been mooted, and it was the site of an airfield in the 1940s, but similar environmental concerns exist there. There is some debate as to whether a new airport is really needed, given the cost, the environmental problems, and the available capacity at alternates Kitakyushu Airport and Saga Airport, though much more distant from the city center.

=== Second runway ===
In 2013, the Japanese government was considering building a second 2,500 m (8,200 ft) parallel runway within the existing airfield at a cost of 180 billion yen, two-thirds of which would be borne by the national government and the remaining third of which would be borne by the local government by 2019. As of April 2017, FUK will follow the model of other airports nationwide and undergo privatization. The second runway officially went into operations in March 2025, to be used only for international departures. Due to its proximity to the first runway, both cannot be used simultaneously.

=== International terminal ===
Construction to double the size of the international passenger terminal was completed in March 2025. Prior to that, the transportation center, "access hall", in the international terminal will be completed in November 2024. A new eight-story parking garage was completed in January 2023. An airport bus-only road connecting the two terminals was opened in November 2024.

=== Domestic terminal ===
Construction of a complex with a huge shopping mall and a hotel at the domestic passenger terminal is scheduled for completion in 2026. To alleviate the serious parking shortage, another nine-story parking building was completed in April 2024.

== Airlines and destinations ==
The following airlines operate scheduled passenger flights to and from Fukuoka:

Airlines	Destinations
Aero K	Cheongju
Air Busan	Busan, Seoul–Incheon
Air Do	Sapporo–Chitose
Air Macau	Macau
Air Seoul	Seoul–Incheon
AirAsia	Kota Kinabalu, Taipei–Taoyuan
All Nippon Airways	Nagoya–Centrair, Naha, Sapporo–Chitose, Tokyo–Haneda
Amakusa Airlines	Amakusa
ANA Wings	Fukue, Komatsu, Miyazaki, Nagoya–Centrair, Naha, Osaka–Itami, Sapporo–Chitose, Tokyo–Haneda, Tsushima
Asiana Airlines	Seoul–Incheon
Cathay Pacific	Hong Kong
Cebu Pacific	Manila
China Airlines	Kaohsiung, Taipei–Taoyuan
China Eastern Airlines	Shanghai–Pudong
Eastar Jet	Busan, Seoul–Incheon
EVA Air	Kaohsiung, Taipei–Taoyuan
Fuji Dream Airlines	Hanamaki, Matsumoto, Nagoya–Komaki, Niigata, Sapporo–Chitose, Sendai, Shizuoka
Greater Bay Airlines	Hong Kong
HK Express	Hong Kong
Hong Kong Airlines	Hong Kong
Ibex Airlines	Nagoya–Centrair, Niigata, Itami-Osaka, Sendai
J-Air	Matsuyama, Miyazaki, Osaka–Itami, Tokushima
Japan Air Commuter	Izumo, Kagoshima, Tanegashima, Yakushima
Japan Airlines	Izumo, Kagoshima, Kōchi, Matsuyama, Miyazaki, Sapporo–Chitose, Tokushima, Tokyo–Haneda
JTA	Naha
Jeju Air	Busan, Jeju, Seoul–Incheon; Seasonal: Muan
Jetstar Japan	Nagoya–Centrair, Osaka–Kansai, Tokyo–Narita
Jin Air	Busan, Seoul–Incheon
Korean Air	Seoul–Incheon
Malaysia Airlines	Kuala Lumpur–International
Oriental Air Bridge	Miyazaki, Nagoya–Centrair, Tsushima; Seasonal: Fukue
Peach	Ishigaki, Naha, Osaka–Kansai, Sapporo–Chitose, Tokyo–Narita
Philippine Airlines	Manila
Singapore Airlines	Singapore
Skymark Airlines	Ibaraki, Naha, Sapporo–Chitose, Shimojishima, Tokyo–Haneda
Solaseed Air	Naha
Spring Airlines	Shanghai–Pudong
StarFlyer	Nagoya–Centrair, Sendai, Tokyo–Haneda
Starlux Airlines	Taipei–Taoyuan
Thai AirAsia	Bangkok–Don Mueang
Thai Airways International	Bangkok–Suvarnabhumi
Thai VietJet Air	Bangkok–Suvarnabhumi
Tigerair Taiwan	Kaohsiung, Taipei–Taoyuan
Trinity Airways	Busan, Cheongju, Daegu, Jeju, Seoul–Incheon
VietJet Air	Hanoi
Vietnam Airlines	Hanoi, Ho Chi Minh City

== Accidents and incidents ==
- In December 1949, a second-year middle school student on a road outside of the airport died from burns received from gasoline fuel dumped from an in-flight airplane.
- On 10 May 1951, a USAF F86 crashed into the Futamatase neighborhood near Itazuke, destroying five houses, and killing 11 residents.
- On 27 December 1951, a USAF Douglas C-47 crashed during takeoff against a maintenance hangar from 30 meters altitude and caught fire. Four occupants were killed and 19 were injured. There was eight ground personnel injuries.
- In September 1952, a military aircraft crashed into a private home near the Josei neighborhood, Sawara Ward, Fukuoka City. The house was destroyed, and one person was killed.
- On 13 November 1957, a U.S. military aircraft dropped an auxiliary tank on the Yoshizuka neighborhood, East Ward, Fukuoka City, completely destroying one house, damaging two others, and killing one person.
- On 7 December 1961, a U.S. F100 crashed in the Kashii neighborhood, East Ward, Fukuoka City, destroying three houses, and killing four people, including a mother and child.
- On 2 June 1968, a USAF F-4 Phantom crashed into the Hakozaki Campus of Kyushu University soon after takeoff from Itazuke. There were no casualties. The crash ignited a year of intense student protests at Kyushu University.
- On 31 March 1970, Japan Airlines Flight 351, carrying 131 passengers and 7 crew from Tokyo to Fukuoka, was hijacked by 9 members of the Japanese Red Army group. 23 passengers were freed at Fukuoka Airport, mainly children and the elderly. 108 passengers and all crew members with the Red Army group left Fukuoka, bound for Gimpo Airport, near Seoul. Three days later, the Red Army group asked to be flown to North Korea's capital Pyongyang, before leaving from Seoul, 103 passenger and crew hostages were freed, and 9 Red Army group members surrendered to North Korean authorities.
- On 17 December 1989, a hijacked CAAC Flight 981 plane made an emergency landing at the airport. The suspect, a Chinese national, was extradited to China after being detained in Japan for four months. He was later tried there and sentenced to eight years of imprisonment and an additional two years of disfranchisement on 18 July 1990.
- On 13 June 1996, a Garuda Indonesia DC-10-30, Flight 865, crashed on take-off, killing 3 passengers and injuring 18. The pilot appeared to hesitate about applying full throttle upon a single engine failure. The crash occurred within the airport perimeter when the aircraft was already airborne, nine feet off the ground.
- On 12 August 2005, JALways Flight 58 operating on a McDonnell Douglas DC-10 suffered an explosive engine failure on take-off. The aircraft safely returned to the airport with no casualties on board, but several people on the ground suffered burns from touching fallen debris from the engine, and a car's windshield was damaged.

== Statistics ==
Fiscal year	International	Domestic	Total
1996	2,532,228	14,126,047	16,658,275
1997	2,452,042	14,893,121	17,345,163
1998	2,326,204	15,608,193	17,934,397
1999	2,412,011	17,091,497	19,503,508
2000	2,528,138	17,041,371	19,569,509
2001	2,087,197	17,411,991	19,499,188
2002	2,279,467	17,398,296	19,677,763
2003	1,659,386	16,823,714	18,483,100
2004	2,245,091	16,328,107	18,573,198
2005	2,173,692	16,386,878	18,560,570
2006	2,238,188	15,885,543	18,123,731
2007	2,274,954	15,551,128	17,826,082
2008	2,041,711	14,775,647	16,817,358
2009	2,102,034	13,924,411	16,026,445
2010	2,426,396	13,527,260	15,953,656
2011	2,547,303	13,254,849	15,802,152
2012	3,039,507	14,742,677	17,782,184
2013	3,189,780	16,102,247	19,292,027
2014	3,672,011	16,332,309	20,004,320
2015	4,646,406	16,721,320	21,367,726
2016	5,179,508	17,139,319	22,318,827
2017	6,333,487	17,645,735	23,979,222
2018	6,918,571	17,926,887	24,845,458
2019	6,398,065	18,281,552	24,679,617
2020	878,567	8,705,315	9,583,882
2021	21,907	8,454,030	8,475,937
2022	933,791	13,890,823	14,824,614
Sources: Civil Aviation Bureau Units: persons (1996~2018) Japan Aviation Hub: persons (2019~2022)

== Current Japan Self-Defense Force units ==
Commanded from the nearby Kasuga Air Base:

- Japan Air Self-Defense Force
  - Western Air Command Support Squadron (Kawasaki T-4)
  - Kasuga Helicopter Airlift Squadron (CH-47J)

== See also ==
- Naval Base Okinawa
