= Komatsu Airport =

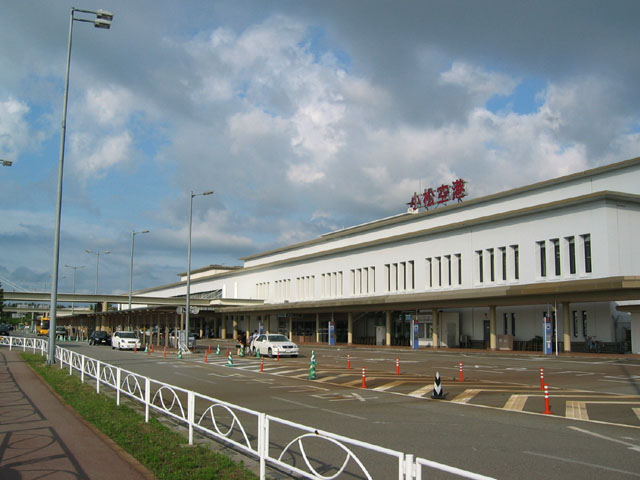
- IATA: KMQ; ICAO: RJNK

Summary
- Airport type: Public / Military
- Operator: Ishikawa Prefecture / JASDF
- Serves: Ishikawa Prefecture and Northern Fukui Prefecture
- Location: Komatsu, Ishikawa Prefecture, Japan
- Elevation AMSL: 22 ft (6.7 m)
- Coordinates: 36°23′38″N 136°24′27″E
- Website: Komatsu Airport

Map
- Location in Ishikawa Prefecture Location in Japan

Runways
Direction	Length		Surface
Direction	m	ft	Surface
06/24	2,700	8,858	Concrete

Statistics (2015)
- Passengers: 1,844,117
- Cargo (metric tonnes): 14,482
- Aircraft movement: 17,750
- Source: Japanese Ministry of Land, Infrastructure, Transport and Tourism

Komatsu Airport (小松飛行場, Komatsu Hikōjō) (IATA: KMQ, ICAO: RJNK) is an international airport located 4.2 km (2.6 mi) west-southwest of Komatsu Station in the city of Komatsu, Ishikawa Prefecture, Japan. It is the largest airport in the Hokuriku region and serves the southern portion of Ishikawa Prefecture including the capital of Kanazawa (which has its IATA city code QKW), as well as Fukui and the northern portion of Fukui Prefecture.

The Japan Air Self-Defense Force Komatsu Base (小松基地 Komatsu Kichi) shares the runway with civil aviation; the inland-side taxiway is used by the JASDF and the sea-side one by civilian flights. The base hosts a Kōkū-sai (air festival) every September, featuring demo flights by fighter and rescue aircraft as well as the Blue Impulse acrobat flight team. It often hosts technical competitions of the JASDF. The "Airspace G" is a large training airspace over the Sea of Japan to the north of the base.

The airport has a single passenger terminal building serving domestic and international flights. Its international cargo terminal, known as HIACT (Hokuriku International Air Cargo Terminal), is owned by a consortium of government and corporate entities and aims to serve as an international distribution center for cargo from Europe and other continents. Its runway surface was upgraded in late 2006 to enable non-stop freighter flights to and from Europe and North America.

== History ==
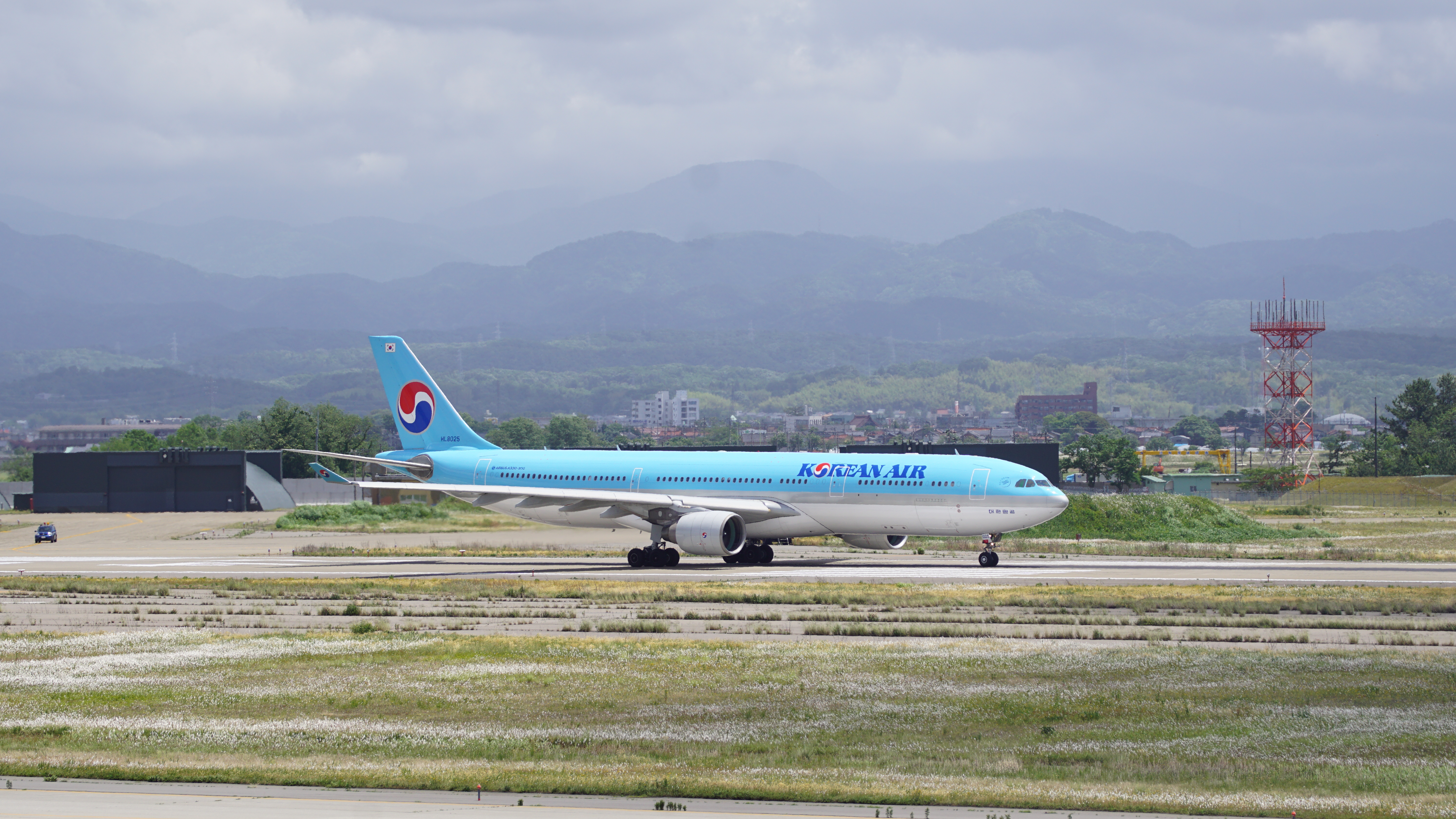
Korean Air Airbus A330-300 (2017)

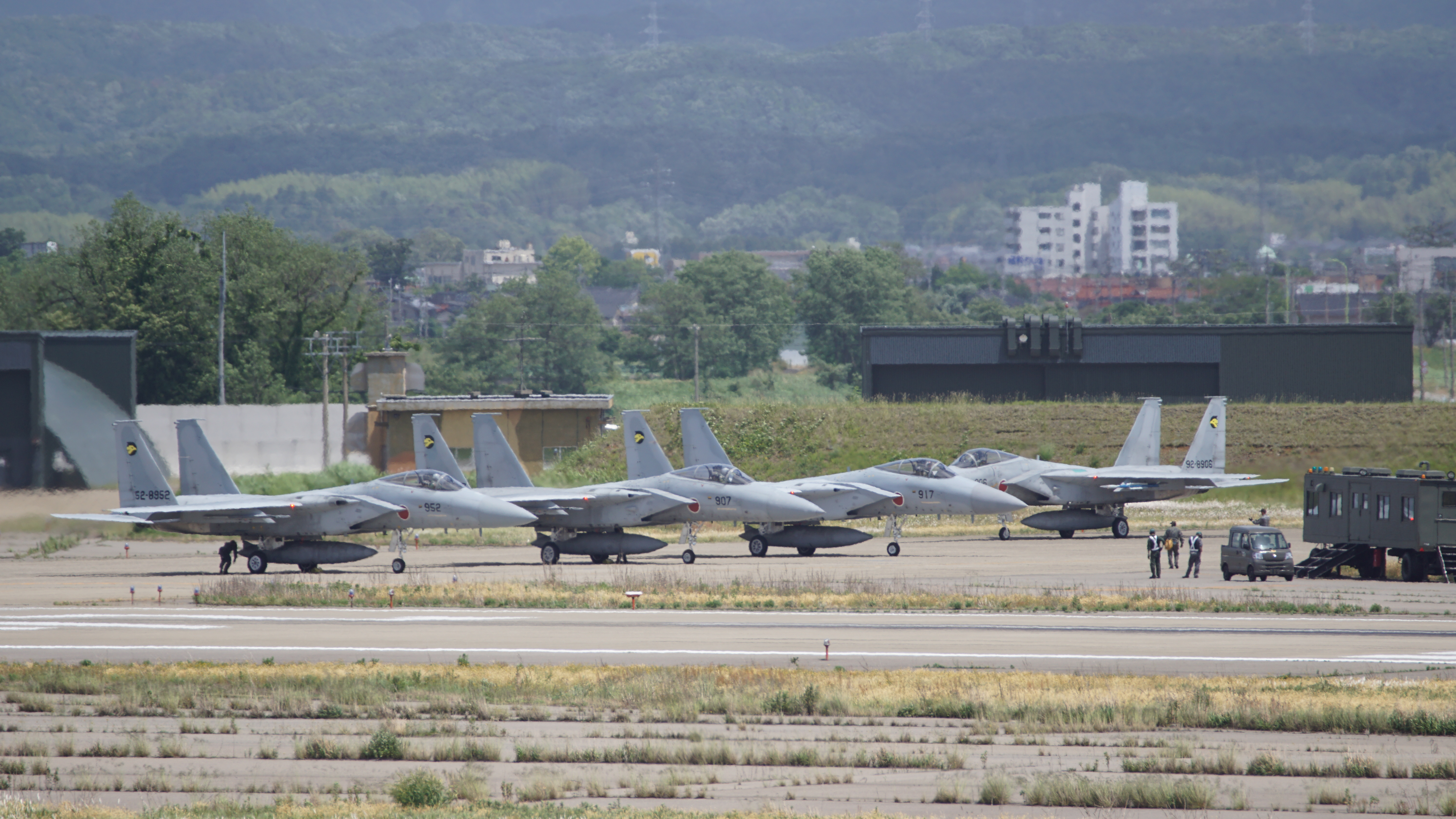
JASDF 306th Sqn Mitsubishi F-15Js (2017)

The airport was originally a base of the Imperial Japanese Navy during World War II. Construction of the first 1,500 m (4,921 ft) east-west and 1,700 m (5,577 ft) north–south runways was completed in 1944. The United States Armed Forces took over the base at the end of the war in 1945 and used the site as a radar facility. The airport saw irregular service to Osaka and Nagoya starting in 1955.

The base was handed over to the Japan Air Self-Defense Force in 1958 and designated as a jet fighter base in 1960. Komatsu Base was formally inaugurated in 1961. Scheduled service to Osaka and Nagoya began in 1962, using Douglas DC-3 aircraft, followed by Fokker F.27 service to Tokyo in 1963. The airport's first international service was a charter flight from Hong Kong in 1973.

Ishikawa Prefecture set aside funds for an airport promotion committee in 2012 amid expectations that the opening of the Hokuriku Shinkansen in 2015 would impact traffic on the Komatsu-Tokyo route.

- 1960: The runway was extended to 2,400 m (7,874 ft). Designated as a shared airport for defense and civil.
- 1964: The runway was extended to 2,700 m (8,858 ft) to introduce F-104J.
- 1973: Jet service began with Boeing 737s.
- 1979: International scheduled service to Seoul began.
- 1980: Boeing 747s were introduced to Komatsu Airport, for flights to Tokyo
- 1981: The new domestic terminal complete.
- 1984: The new international terminal complete.
- 1994: HIACT (International Cargo Building) complete. Designated as a Free Access Zone.
- 1994: Cargolux began international scheduled freight service between Luxembourg.
- 2002: The new HIACT terminal complete.
- 2004: The new control tower began operations.
- 2005: The temporary runway began operation.
- 2006: Upgrading of the permanent runway complete. Operations switched to the permanent runway.
- 2007: USAF F-15C, C-17 came for JASDF joint training.
- 2007: A new domestic cargo building opens.

== Statistics ==
Year	Total passengers
2000	2,587,941
2001	2,590,333
2002	2,645,038
2003	2,599,706
2004	2,495,837

== Airlines and destinations ==
=== Passenger ===
Airlines	Destinations
All Nippon Airways	Sapporo–Chitose, Tokyo–Haneda
ANA Wings	Fukuoka
EVA Air	Taipei–Taoyuan
HK Express	Hong Kong
Japan Airlines	Tokyo–Haneda
Japan Transocean Air	Naha
Korean Air	Seoul–Incheon
Tigerair Taiwan	Kaohsiung, Taipei–Taoyuan

=== Cargo ===
Airlines	Destinations
Cargolux	Chicago–O'Hare, Hong Kong, Luxembourg, Seoul–Incheon

== JASDF units ==
Komatsu is the only fighter base on the Sea of Japan coast. The following JASDF units are stationed at Komatsu:

- 6th Air Wing (第6航空団)
  - 303rd Tactical Fighter Squadron (Mitsubishi F-15J/DJ), (Kawasaki T-4), (Mitsubishi F-35A)
  - 306th Tactical Fighter Squadron (Mitsubishi F-15J/DJ), (Kawasaki T-4)
- Tactical Fighter Training Group
- Central Air Civil Engineering Group, 2nd Squadron (中部航空施設隊第2作業隊)
- Komatsu Air Rescue Squadron (小松救難隊) – UH-60J and U-125A aircraft
- Komatsu Air Traffic Control Squadron (小松管制隊)
- Komatsu Weather Squadron (小松気象隊)
- Komatsu Regional Air Police Squadron (小松地方警務隊) – responsible for criminal investigations of JASDF personnel in Ishikawa Prefecture, Toyama Prefecture and Fukui Prefecture

== Other facilities ==
- Komatsu Airport Office, Ōsaka Air Transportation Bureau.
- Komatsu Office, Air Transportation Security Association.
- Fire and Disaster Mitigation Office, Ishikawa Prefectural Government.
  - Equipped with Bell 412EP fire and disaster mitigation helicopter "Hakusan".
- Komatsu Operations Office, Nakanihon Air Service
  - A helicopter is based here.

== Access ==
The airport is located near the Hokuriku Expressway. Scheduled bus service is available to Kanazawa Station (40 minutes), Komatsu Station (15 minutes) and Fukui Station (1 hour).
