= Mount Chitose =

Mount Chitose (千歳山, Chitose-yama) is the name of several mountains in Japan. An incomplete list of the mountains is included below.

- Mount Chitose (Kamikawa), in Hokkaidō Prefecture
- Mount Chitose (Yamagata), in Yamagata Prefecture
- Mount Chitose (Kyoto), in Kyoto Prefecture
- Mount Chitose (Okinawa), in Senkaku Islands, Okinawa Prefecture
