= Mount Shinten =

Mountain in Okinawa Prefecture, Japan

- 信天山
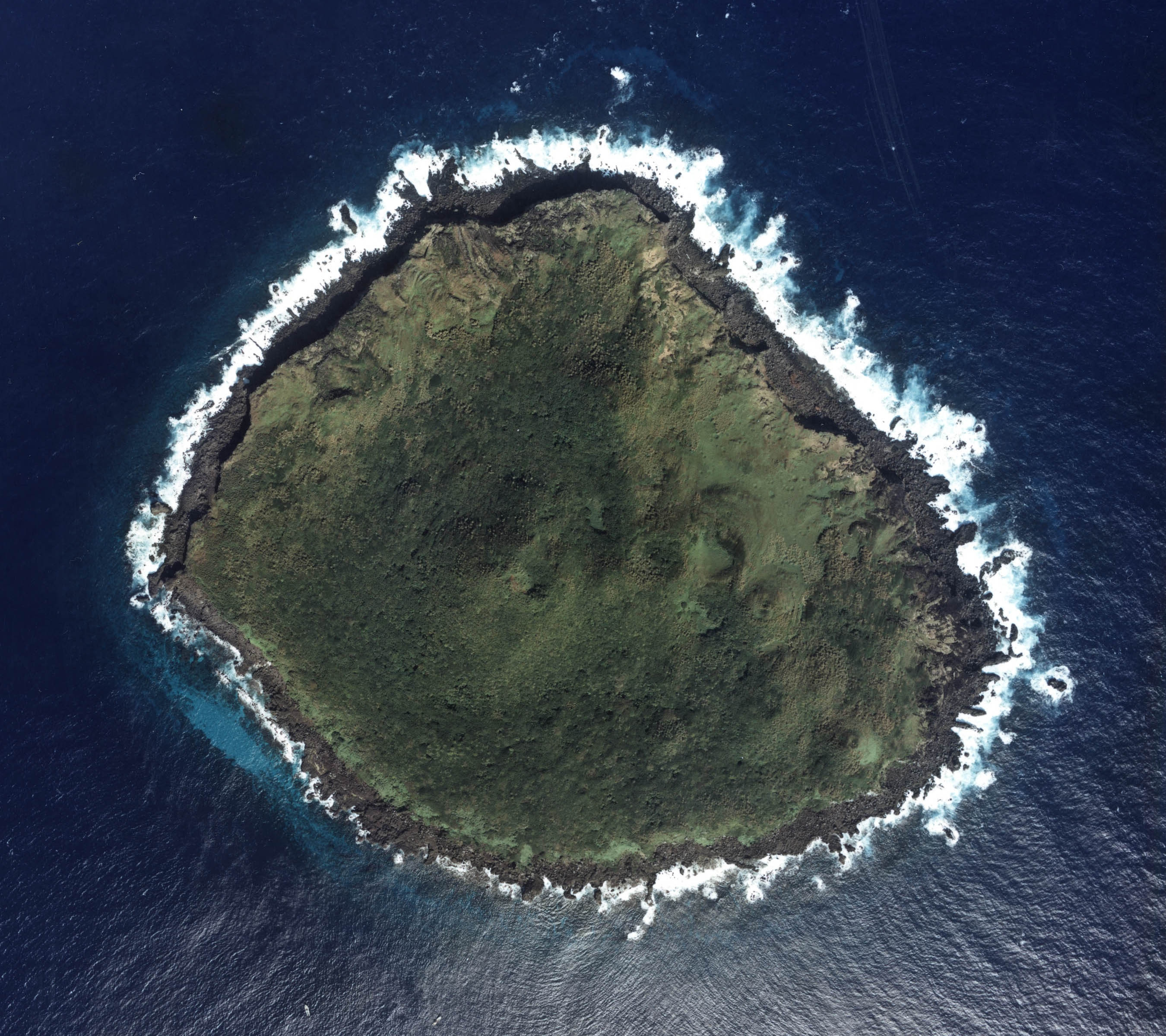
- Mount Shinten on Kuba-jima

Highest point
- Elevation: 105 m (344 ft)
- Coordinates: 25°55′31.5″N 123°40′57.5″E

Geography
- Location within Japan
- Location: Ishigaki, Okinawa Prefecture, Japan

Mount Shinten (信天山, Shinten-yama) is a mountain located on Kuba-jima of Senkaku Islands in Ishigaki, Okinawa, Japan. It is the second highest point of the island, after Mount Chitose.
