= Mount Chitose (Okinawa) =

Mountain in Okinawa, Japan

- 千歳山
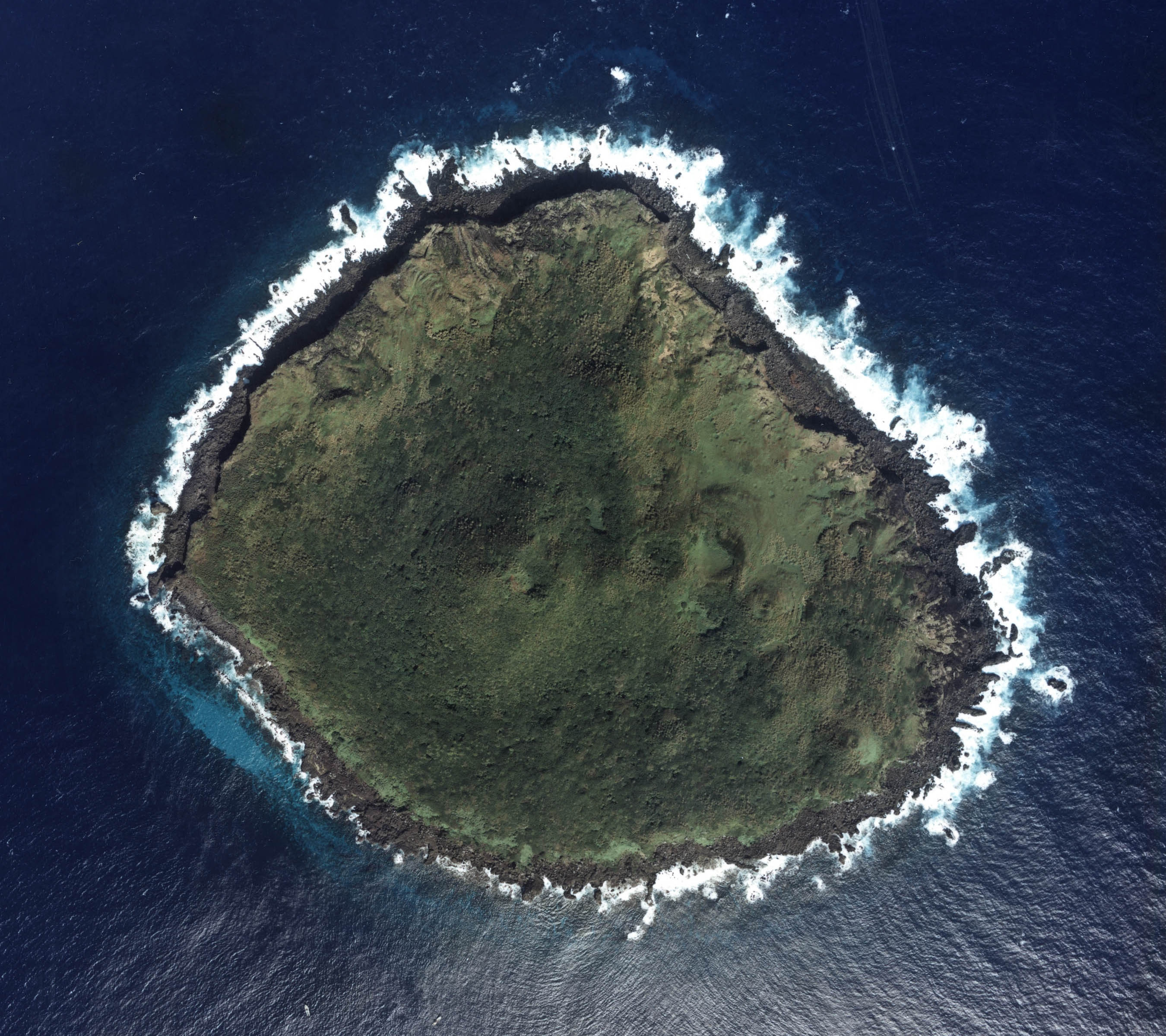
- Mount Chitose on Kuba-jima

Highest point
- Elevation: 117 m (384 ft)
- Coordinates: 25°55′24.3″N 123°40′51″E

Geography
- Location within Japan
- Location: Ishigaki, Okinawa Prefecture, Japan

Mount Chitose (千歳山, Chitose-yama; Yaeyama: Tsïtusï-yama) is a mountain located on Kuba-jima of Senkaku Islands in Ishigaki, Okinawa, Japan. It is the highest point of the island, followed by Mount Shinten.
