= Far Eastern Air Transport Flight 104 =

1969 aviation accident

Far Eastern Transport Flight 104
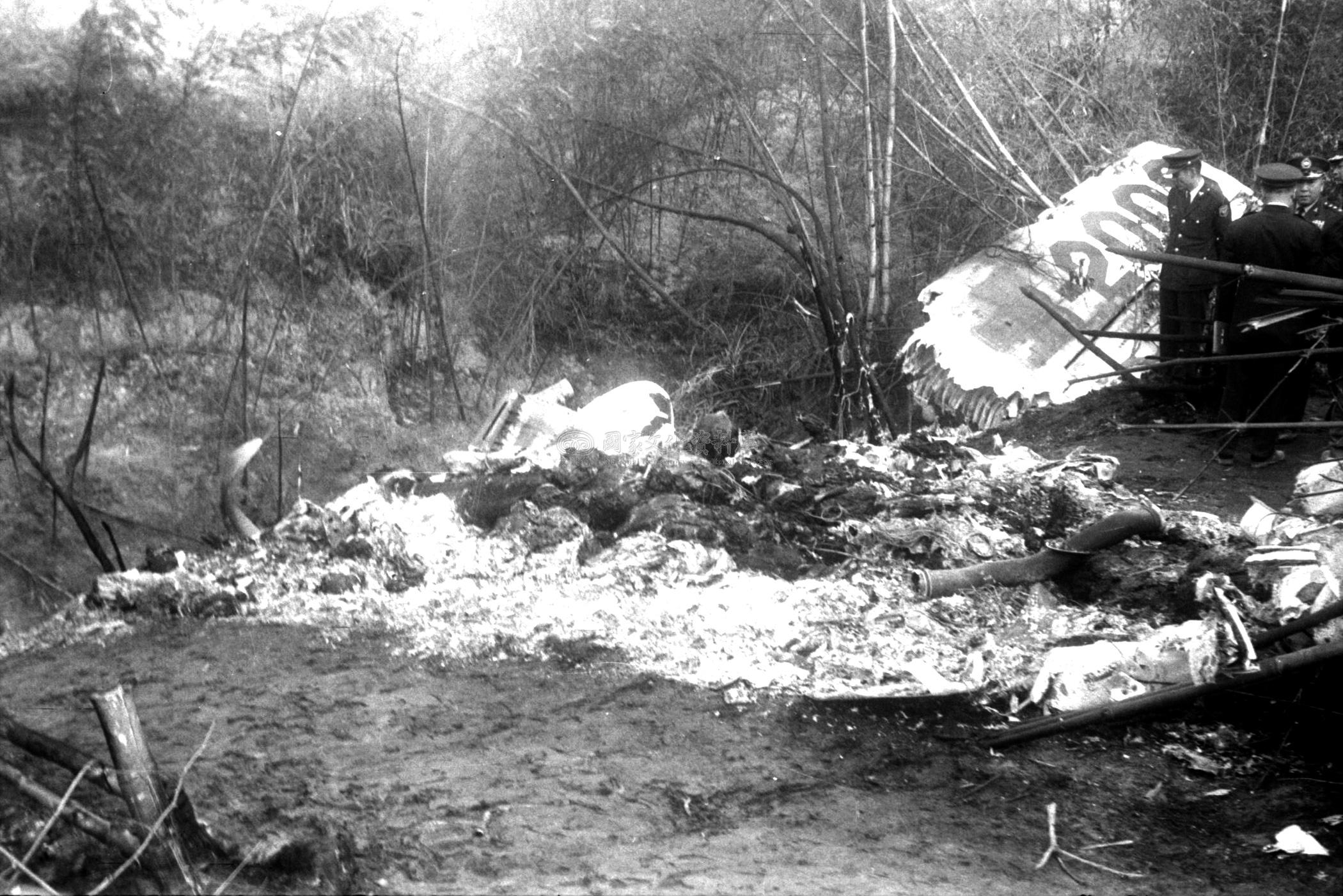
- Investigators at the wreckage of B-2009.

Accident
- Date: February 24, 1969
- Summary: Engine failure
- Site: Near Tainan City, Taiwan

Aircraft
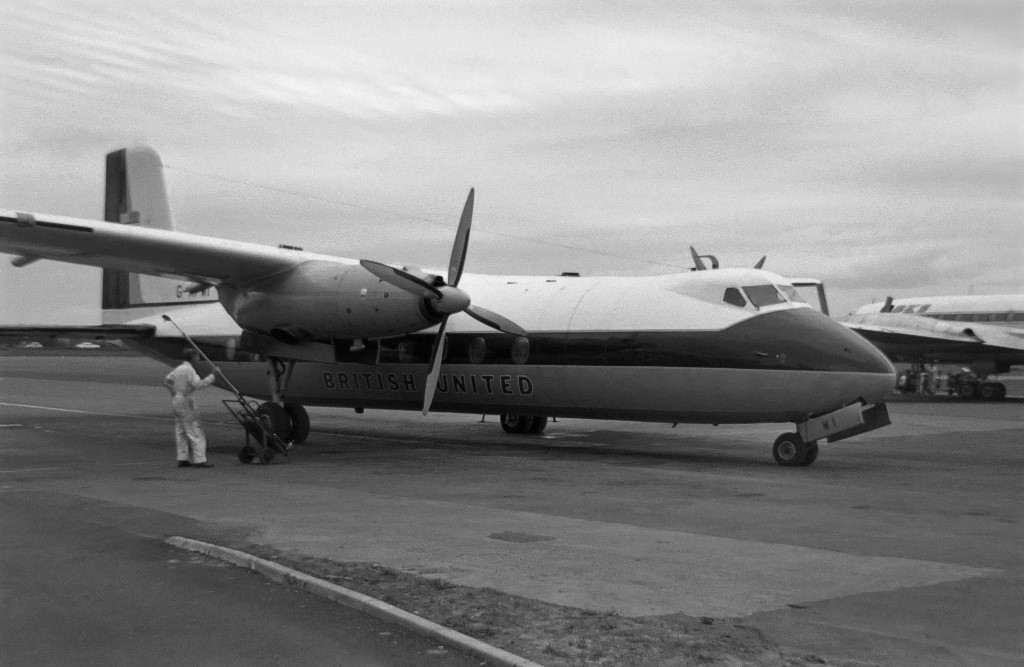
- The Handley Page Dart Herald involved in the accident, seen in June 1966 while still in service with British United Airways
- Aircraft type: Handley Page Dart Herald 201
- Operator: Far Eastern Air Transport
- Registration: B-2009
- Flight origin: Kaohsiung International Airport
- Destination: Taipei Songshan Airport
- Occupants: 36
- Passengers: 32
- Crew: 4
- Fatalities: 36
- Survivors: 0

Far Eastern Air Transport Flight 104 was a short-haul flight from Kaohsiung International Airport to Taipei Songshan Airport, Taiwan, which was operated a Handley Page Dart Herald 201 that crashed on 24 February 1969 upon its approach for an emergency landing in Tainan Airport in Taiwan.

== Aircraft ==
The aircraft operating flight 104 was a Handley Page Dart Herald 201, MSN 157 and was registered B-2009. The aircraft was manufactured in 1963 at the Radlett Aerodrome in the UK with registration G-APWI. It was then bought by Jersey Airlines, then British United Airways then BUIA. It soon went to be purchased by Far Eastern Air Transport.

== Accident ==
On February 24, 1969, the B-2009 aircraft carried out the FE104 flight that ended the Spring Festival holiday and flew from Kaohsiung International Airport to Taipei Songshan Airport. The flight took off at 12:03 pm, after a 13-minute delay from 11:50 am. Ten minutes after take-off, the captain told the Tainan Airport Tower that an engine failure had occurred. The aircraft's port-side engine had failed, leaving its propeller windmilling and the aircraft in a shallow descent. The flight crew decided to divert to Tainan Airport in Tainan City. Moments after receiving clearance for an emergency landing, however, the aircraft passed over a wooded area, belly-landed in a small clearing and skidded into a creek. The aircraft broke into three parts and caught fire, killing all on board.

== Cause ==
The crash was believed to have an engine failure mid-flight. The crew failed to feather the propeller that was making high drag, leading it to lose control.
