= Flight 134 =

Flight 134 may refer to:

- Aviaco Flight 134, involved in a runway collision at Madrid Airport on 7 December 1983
- Far Eastern Air Transport Flight 134, crashed on 31 July 1975
