= Far Eastern Air Transport =

Airline of Taiwan (1957–2008; 2011–2019)

FAT Taiwan Inc. 遠東航空
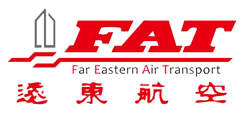
IATA	ICAO	Call sign
FE	FEA	FAR EASTERN
- Founded: Part 1: 5 June 1957; Part 2: 18 April 2011
- Ceased operations: Part 1: 13 May 2008; Part 2: 12 December 2019
- Hubs: Taipei–Songshan; Taipei–Taoyuan
- Subsidiaries: Angkor Airways (2004–2008); Pelandok Airways (1971–1972)
- Fleet size: 12
- Destinations: 19 (scheduled)
- Headquarters: Songshan, Taipei, Taiwan
- Key people: Chang Kang-wei (Chairman & Majority Owner)

Far Eastern Air Transport
- Traditional Chinese: 遠東航空
Transcriptions
Standard Mandarin
- Hanyu Pinyin: Yuǎndōng hángkōng

Far Eastern Air Transport (FAT) was an airline with its head office in Songshan District, Taipei, Taiwan (Republic of China).

Established in 1957, it operated domestic services from Taipei and Kaohsiung to five regional cities and international services to Southeast Asia, South Korea and Palau. Its main base was Taipei Songshan Airport. After a succession of financial crises in early 2008, the airline publicly announced its bankruptcy and stopped all flights with effect from 13 May 2008. The airline recommenced operations on 18 April 2011. The airline emerged from bankruptcy restructuring on 16 October 2015. It continued to face financial problems, and operations were halted from 13 December 2019.

== History ==
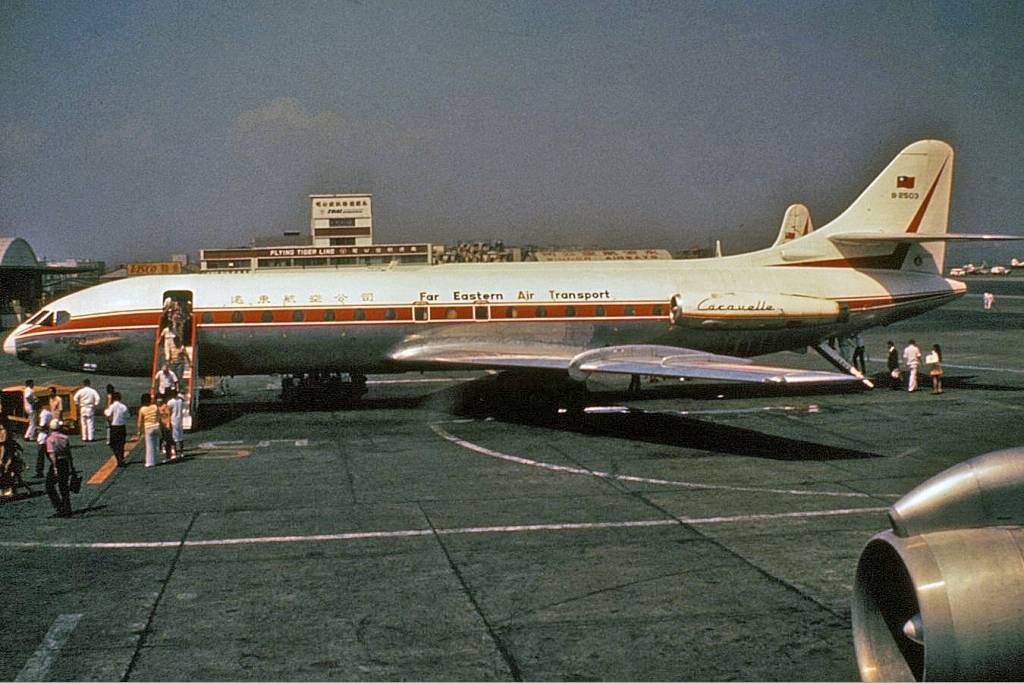
Sud Aviation SE-210 Caravelle in 1972

The airline was established in 1957 and started operations in November the same year. It originally focused on charter flights until the introduction of scheduled services in January 1965. For the next 30 years the airline was the No. 1 carrier on Taiwanese domestic routes and was granted the right to fly regular international flights in 1996, from Kaohsiung International Airport to Palau and Subic Bay. It started cargo operations in the Asian region in 2004. Beginning in 2004, FAT invested in the Cambodian airline, Angkor Airways. Angkor Airways subsequently shut down flight operations on 9 May 2009.

Due to ever-rising fuel prices and Taiwan High Speed Rail's inauguration, the airline suffered financial losses from early 2007 and the situation was seriously worsened by poor financial management and risky investments. On 13 February 2008 FAT failed to pay USD 848,000 it owed to the International Clearing House, a financial subsidiary of the International Air Transport Association (IATA); and IATA cancelled the airline's membership as a result. Although a local court granted FAT's restructuring application on 23 February 2008, in the next three months it still failed to obtain the necessary funds and the company's bankruptcy protection expired on 22 May. FAT had stopped paying employee salaries but the staff were still on duty as of May 2008 because they wanted to try to save the company but some were saying they could not hold on much longer.

On 27 November 2010, a McDonnell Douglas MD-83 of FAT began flight test at Taipei Songshan Airport at 10am, marking the airline's return to the skies. The aviation authority in Taiwan granted a test flight license to FAT but required an additional test flight and NT$ 50 million as deposit before re-granting an airline operating license. The airline restarted its services on 18 April 2011. Far Eastern Air Transport announced a stoppage affecting all operations on 13 December 2019. However, the next day, the company chairman rescinded the statement. Transportation minister Lin Chia-lung confirmed on 16 December 2019 that Far Eastern Air Transport had in fact ceased operations, and had to discuss resuming services with the Civil Aeronautics Administration. In January 2020, the Civil Aeronautics Administration recommended to the Ministry of Transportation and Communications that Far Easter Air Transport's air operator certificate be revoked. Later that month, company chairman Chang Kang-wei stated that a group of people led by Tsai Meng-che offered to invest in Far Eastern Air Transport if the government lifted flight restrictions. Following the announcement, a number of FAT employees petitioned the government, asking relevant authorities to lift restrictions on the airline. The Ministry of Transportation and Communications formally revoked Far Eastern Air Transport's air operator certificate on 31 January 2020.

== Destinations ==
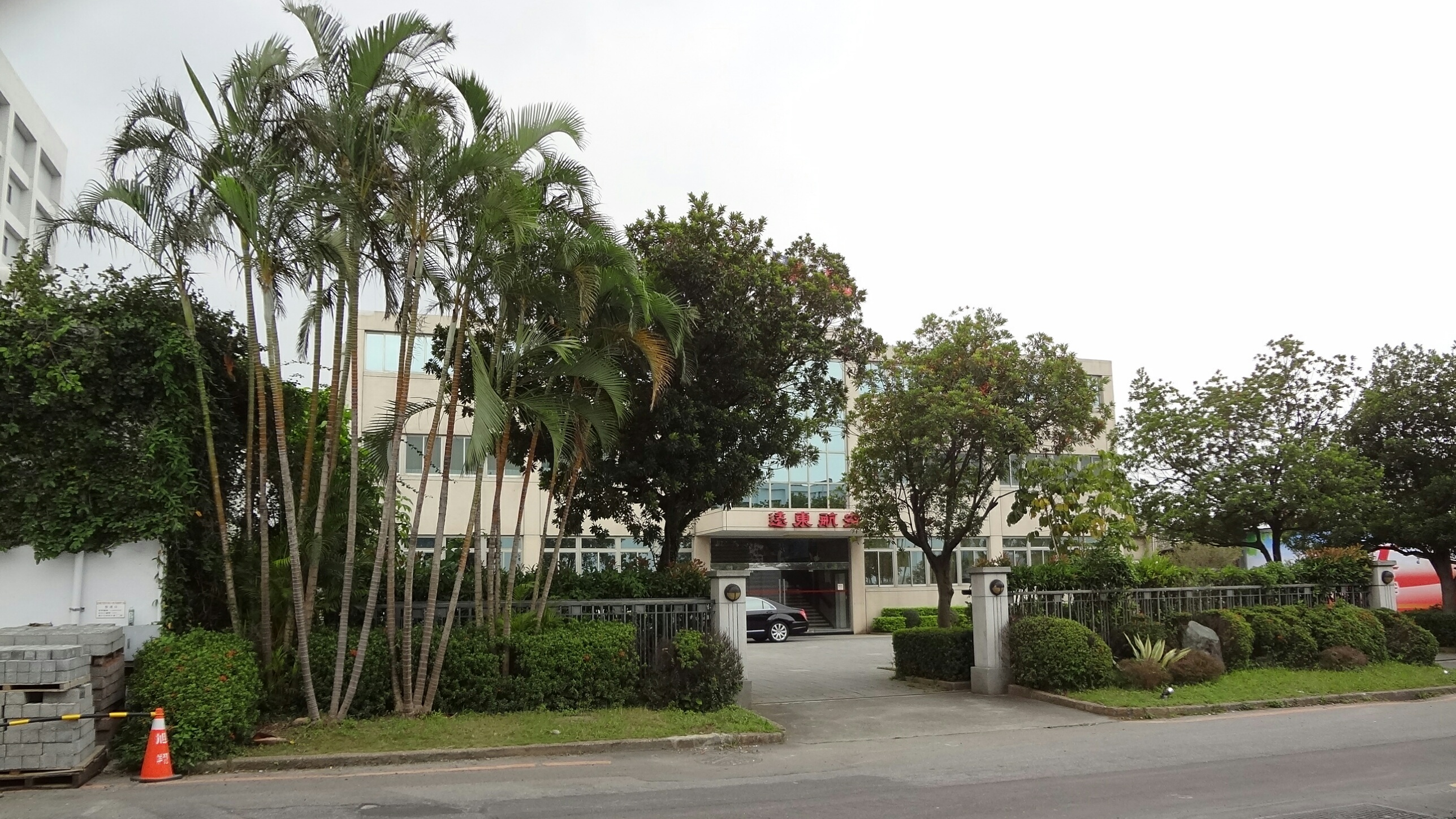
FAT headquarters

Far Eastern Air Transport operated the following services when it ceased operations in December 2019:

Country	City	Airport	Notes	Refs
Cambodia	Phnom Penh	Phnom Penh International Airport	Terminated	
Cambodia	Siem Reap	Siem Reap International Airport^{Charter}	Terminated	
China	Beijing	Beijing Capital International Airport	Terminated	
China	Chengdu	Chengdu Shuangliu International Airport		
China	Fuzhou	Fuzhou Changle International Airport		
China	Guilin	Guilin Liangjiang International Airport		
China	Haikou	Haikou Meilan International Airport	Terminated	
China	Harbin	Harbin Taiping International Airport^{Charter}	Terminated	
China	Hohhot	Hohhot Baita International Airport	Terminated	
China	Hefei	Hefei Luogang Airport	Airport closed	
China	Hefei	Hefei Xinqiao International Airport		
China	Nanjing	Nanjing Lukou International Airport^{Charter}	Terminated	
China	Nanning	Nanning Wuxu International Airport		
China	Qingdao	Qingdao Liuting International Airport	Terminated	
China	Sanya	Sanya Phoenix International Airport	Terminated	
China	Shenyang	Shenyang Taoxian International Airport^{Charter}	Terminated	
China	Shijiazhuang	Shijiazhuang Zhengding International Airport^{Charter}	Terminated	
China	Taiyuan	Taiyuan Wusu International Airport^{Charter}	Terminated	
China	Tianjin	Tianjin Binhai International Airport		
China	Weihai	Weihai Dashuipo International Airport	Terminated	
China	Wuhan	Wuhan Tianhe International Airport	Terminated	
China	Xi'an	Xi'an Xianyang International Airport	Terminated	
China	Xiamen	Xiamen Gaoqi International Airport^{Charter}	Terminated	
China	Yichang	Yichang Sanxia Airport	Terminated	
China	Zhengzhou	Zhengzhou Xinzheng International Airport^{Charter}	Terminated	
Guam	Hagåtña	Antonio B. Won Pat International Airport	Terminated	
Hong Kong	Hong Kong	Hong Kong International Airport^{Charter}	Terminated	
Indonesia	Denpasar	Ngurah Rai International Airport	Terminated	
Indonesia	Makassar	Sultan Hasanuddin International Airport	Charter	
Japan	Fukuoka	Fukuoka Airport	Terminated	
Japan	Hiroshima	Hiroshima Airport	Terminated	
Japan	Ishigaki	New Ishigaki Airport	Terminated	
Japan	Kumamoto	Kumamoto Airport	Terminated	
Japan	Niigata	Niigata Airport	Terminated	
Japan	Osaka	Kansai International Airport	Terminated	
Japan	Sapporo	New Chitose Airport	Terminated	
Japan	Takamatsu	Takamatsu Airport	Terminated	
Japan	Tokyo	Haneda Airport	Terminated	
Macau	Macau	Macau International Airport^{Charter}	Terminated	
Malaysia	Kota Kinabalu	Kota Kinabalu International Airport	Terminated	
Malaysia	Kuala Lumpur	Kuala Lumpur International Airport	Terminated	
Myanmar	Yangon	Yangon International Airport	Terminated	
North Korea	Pyongyang	Pyongyang International Airport	Terminated	
Palau	Koror	Roman Tmetuchl International Airport	Terminated	
Philippines	Cebu	Mactan–Cebu International Airport ^{Charter}	Terminated	
Philippines	Laoag	Laoag International Airport	Terminated	
South Korea	Busan	Gimhae International Airport	Terminated	
South Korea	Jeju	Jeju International Airport		
South Korea	Seoul	Gimpo International Airport	Terminated	
Taiwan	Hualien	Hualien Airport	Terminated	
Taiwan	Kaohsiung	Kaohsiung International Airport	Secondary hub	
Taiwan	Kinmen	Kinmen Airport		
Taiwan	Magong	Penghu Airport		
Taiwan	Taichung	Taichung International Airport		
Taiwan	Taipei	Songshan Airport	Main hub	
Taiwan	Taipei	Taoyuan International Airport	Terminated	
Taiwan	Tainan	Tainan Airport	Terminated	
Taiwan	Taitung	Taitung Airport	Terminated	
Vietnam	Da Nang	Da Nang International Airport	Terminated	
Vietnam	Hanoi	Noi Bai International Airport	Terminated	

== Fleet ==
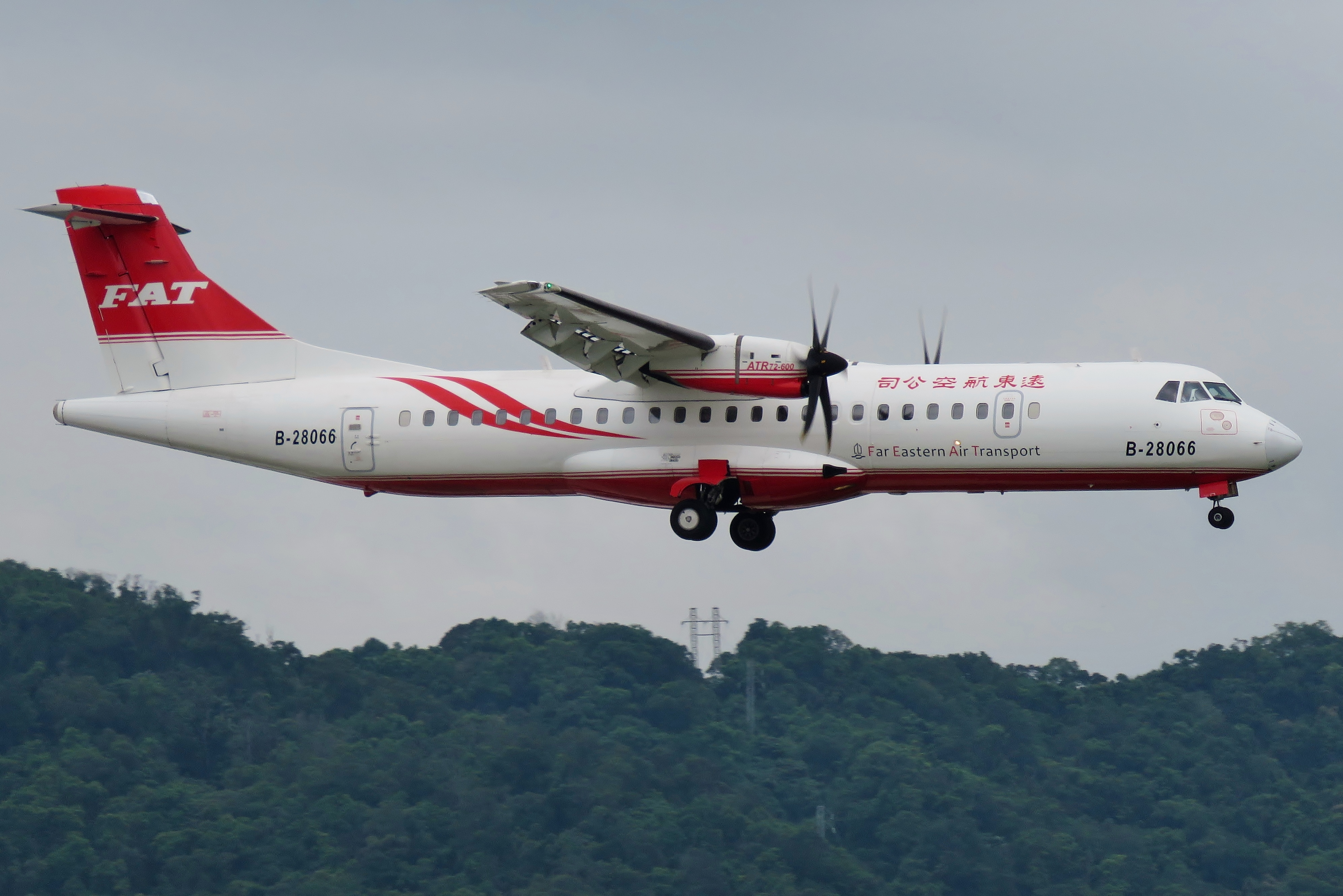
A regional ATR 72-600 airliner

As of December 2019, Far Eastern Air Transport operated the following aircraft:

Far Eastern Air Transport fleet
Aircraft	In service	Orders	Passengers		Notes
Aircraft	In service	Orders	Y	Total	Notes
ATR 72-600	6	—	70	70	
McDonnell Douglas MD-82	4	—	165	165	
McDonnell Douglas MD-83	2	—	165	165	
Total	12	—			

Far Eastern Air Transport reached a deal to lease two Boeing 737-800s, one new and one used, from Air Lease Corporation in 2015, but a contract dispute over the condition of the used aircraft prevented both from entering service.

=== Previously operated ===
Far Eastern Air Transport former fleet
Aircraft	Total	Introduced	Retired	Notes
Beechcraft C-45 Expeditor	Unknown	Unknown	Unknown	
Boeing 737-100	2	1981	1993	
Boeing 737-200	9	1976	1999	
Boeing 757-200	9	1994	2008	
Douglas DC-3	Unknown	Unknown	Unknown	Four written off.
Douglas DC-6	Unknown	Unknown	Unknown	
Handley Page Dart Herald	3	1966	1987	One crashed as Flight 104.
McDonnell Douglas MD-90-30	2	2002	2004	Leased from Uni Air.
Sud Aviation Caravelle	Unknown	Unknown	Unknown	
Vickers Viscount	Unknown	Unknown	Unknown	Two written off.

== Incidents and accidents ==
- 15 February 1969: A Douglas DC-3 (registered B-241) was damaged beyond economic repair in an accident at Kaohsiung International Airport, Taiwan.
- 24 February 1969: Flight 104, a Handley Page Dart Herald (registered B-2009), crashed near Tainan City. All 36 passengers and crew on board were killed.
- 24 April 1969: A Douglas DC-3 (registered B-251) was damaged beyond economic repair in a landing accident at Phan Thiết Airport, Vietnam. All 31 passengers and crew survived.
- 20 February 1970: A Douglas DC-3 (registered B-243) crashed into a mountain shortly after takeoff from Taipei Songshan Airport. The aircraft was operating a cargo flight, both crew were killed.
- 7 October 1974: A Vickers Viscount was the subject of an attempted hijacking. The hijacker was overpowered and the aircraft landed at its intended destination of Taipei Songshan Airport.
- 31 July 1975: Flight 134, a Vickers Viscount crashed at Taipei Songshan Airport, killing 27 of the 75 people on board.
- 16 April 1977: A Douglas DC-3 (registered B-247) was damaged beyond economic repair in a landing accident at Tainan Airport.
- 22 August 1981: Flight 103, a Boeing 737-200 (registered B-2603) broke up in flight and crashed in Sanyi Township, Miaoli County. Severe corrosion in the fuselage structure led to an explosive decompression and breakup at high altitude. All 110 on board were killed.
- 13 March 2019: Flight 321, a McDonnell Douglas MD-83 (registered B-28027) from Taoyuan International Airport to Kalibo, Aklan veered from the runway into muddy fields upon landing at Kalibo International Airport at 18:05 local Philippine time.

== See also ==
- List of airlines of Taiwan
