= Kinmen Airport =

Airport in Kinmen, Taiwan

Kinmen Shangyi Airport 金門航空站 金門尚義機場
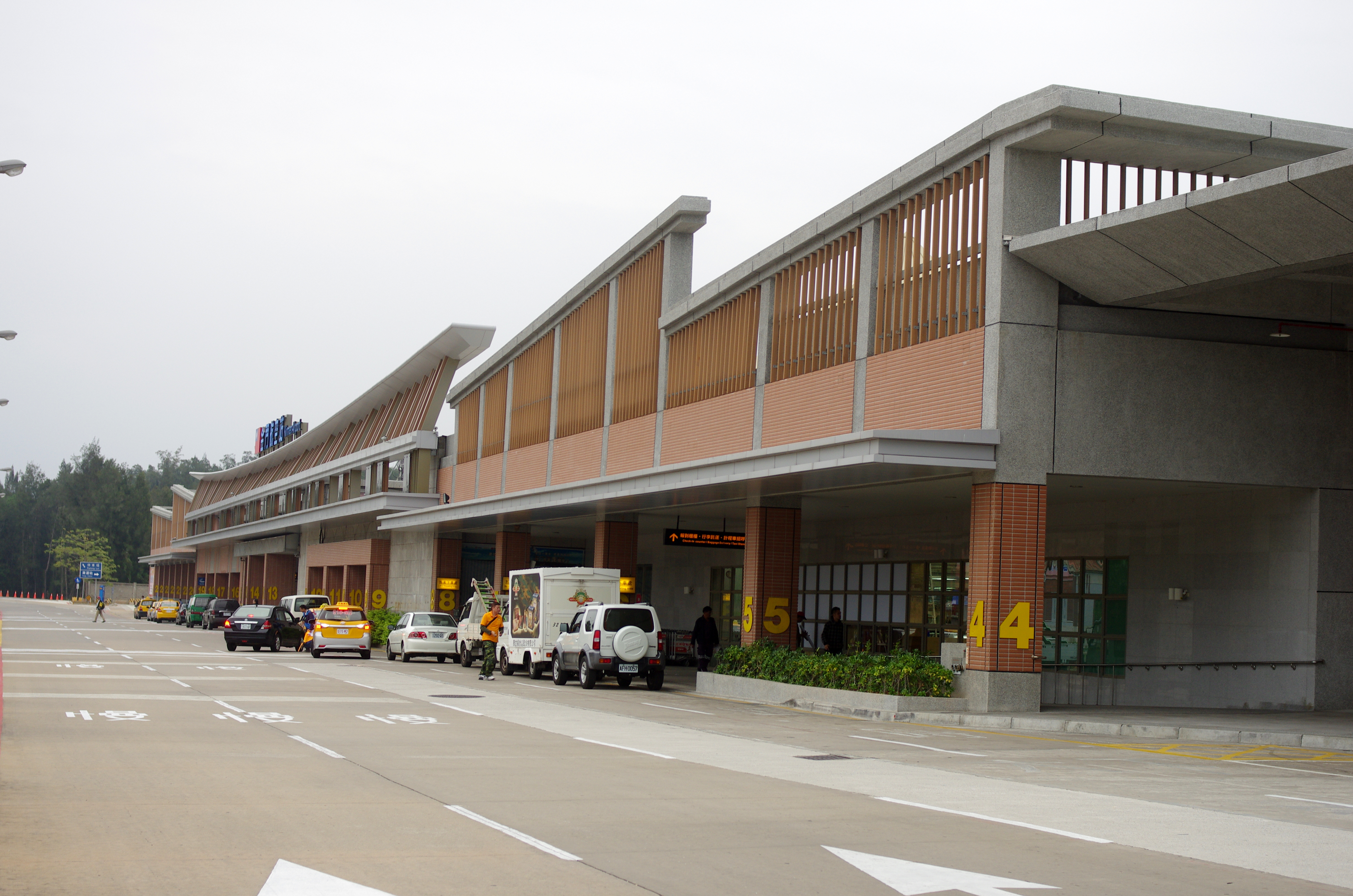
- IATA: KNH; ICAO: RCBS

Summary
- Airport type: Public / Military
- Operator: Civil Aeronautics Administration
- Serves: Kinmen
- Location: Jinhu Township, Kinmen, Fuchien Province, Taiwan
- Elevation AMSL: 28 m (92 ft)
- Coordinates: 24°25′40″N 118°21′33″E

Map
- Location of airport in Taiwan

Runways
Direction	Length		Surface
Direction	m	ft	Surface
06/24	3,000	9,843	Asphalt

Kinmen Shangyi Airport
- Traditional Chinese: 金門尚義機場
- Simplified Chinese: 金门尚义机场
Transcriptions
Standard Mandarin
- Hanyu Pinyin: Jīnmén Shàngyì Jīchǎng
Southern Min
- Hokkien POJ: Kim-mn̂g Siōng-gī Ki-tiû

Kinmen Airport
- Traditional Chinese: 金門航空站
- Simplified Chinese: 金门航空站
Transcriptions
Standard Mandarin
- Hanyu Pinyin: Jīnmén Hángkōngzhàn
Southern Min
- Hokkien POJ: kim mn̂g hái khang chām

Kinmen Airport (Chinese: 金門機場) (IATA: KNH, ICAO: RCBS), commonly known as the Shangyi Airport (Chinese: 尚義機場), is a civilian airport serving Kinmen, Fuchien Province, Taiwan. It is located at Jinhu Township of Kinmen County. It was authorized to become a C-class airport under the direct supervision of the Civil Aviation Administration, Ministry of Transportation and Communications of the Executive Yuan. It serves an average of 1.2 million passengers every year.

Due to the high cost of direct cross-strait flights between mainland China and Taiwan compared to domestic fares for each side respectively, traveling via Kinmen with an hourly short thirty-minute ferry ride from Xiamen's Wutong Ferry Terminal, close to Xiamen Gaoqi International Airport has become a popular alternative. Check-in facilities for Kinmen Airport flights exist within the Wutong Ferry Terminal to assist in travel from the mainland to Taiwan.

== History ==
Kinmen Airport was originally established in 1949 in Sihung Village. In June 1951, the Ministry of National Defense ratified TransAsia Airways to launch its first flight to Kinmen and a once-a-week scheduled flight began to operate. On 23 August 1958, the flight was cancelled due to Second Taiwan Strait Crisis with the People's Liberation Army (PLA). The airport was then moved to Shang-i where it is now located, taken over by the Republic of China Air Force (ROCAF) in consideration of the war with PLA.

With the growing number of passengers traveling between Taiwan Island and Kinmen, the government started to reestablish the civilian flight between the two and it began operation in September 1987 by Far Eastern Air Transport, sharing the same apron and terminal building with ROCAF at the airport. Since then, the new era of civilian flight to Kinmen began. Many other airlines joined the flight route.

Taking the necessary steps to accommodate the passenger growth to Kinmen, the Civil Aeronautics Administration (CAA) coordinated with the government for general construction plan of NT$1.5 billion and built a new civilian airport at the northeastern side of the military airport. On 1 March 1994, the Kinmen Civil Airport was formally established, aiming at providing much more safety, convenience and comfort for the passengers and promoting the progress and prosperity of Kinmen. On 3 March 2000, the CAA implemented improvements of facilities, flight security and quality of service at the airport.

== Facilities ==
The airport resides at an elevation of 93 feet (28 m) above mean sea level. It has one runway designated 06/24 with an asphalt surface measuring 3,001 by 45 metres (9,846 ft × 148 ft). The approach route to Kinmen Airport used to be the most dangerous in Taiwan due to the proximity to mainland China and constrains in terrain, the Runway 06 equipped the SSALR approach lighting system (ALS) while the Runway 24 has MALSF. The Runway 06 established the instrument landing system (ILS) in September 2003 after the negotiation with CAAC Xiamen ACC.

A 2,580-metre connecting road links to a highway leading to two townships.

== Airlines and destinations ==
Airlines	Destinations
Mandarin Airlines	Kaohsiung, Taichung, Taipei–Songshan
Uni Air	Chiayi, Kaohsiung, Penghu, Taichung, Tainan, Taipei–Songshan

== See also ==
- Civil Aviation Administration (Taiwan)
- Transportation in Taiwan
- List of airports in Taiwan
- Xiamen Xiang'an International Airport
