= Far Eastern Air Transport Flight 134 =

1975 aviation accident in Taiwan

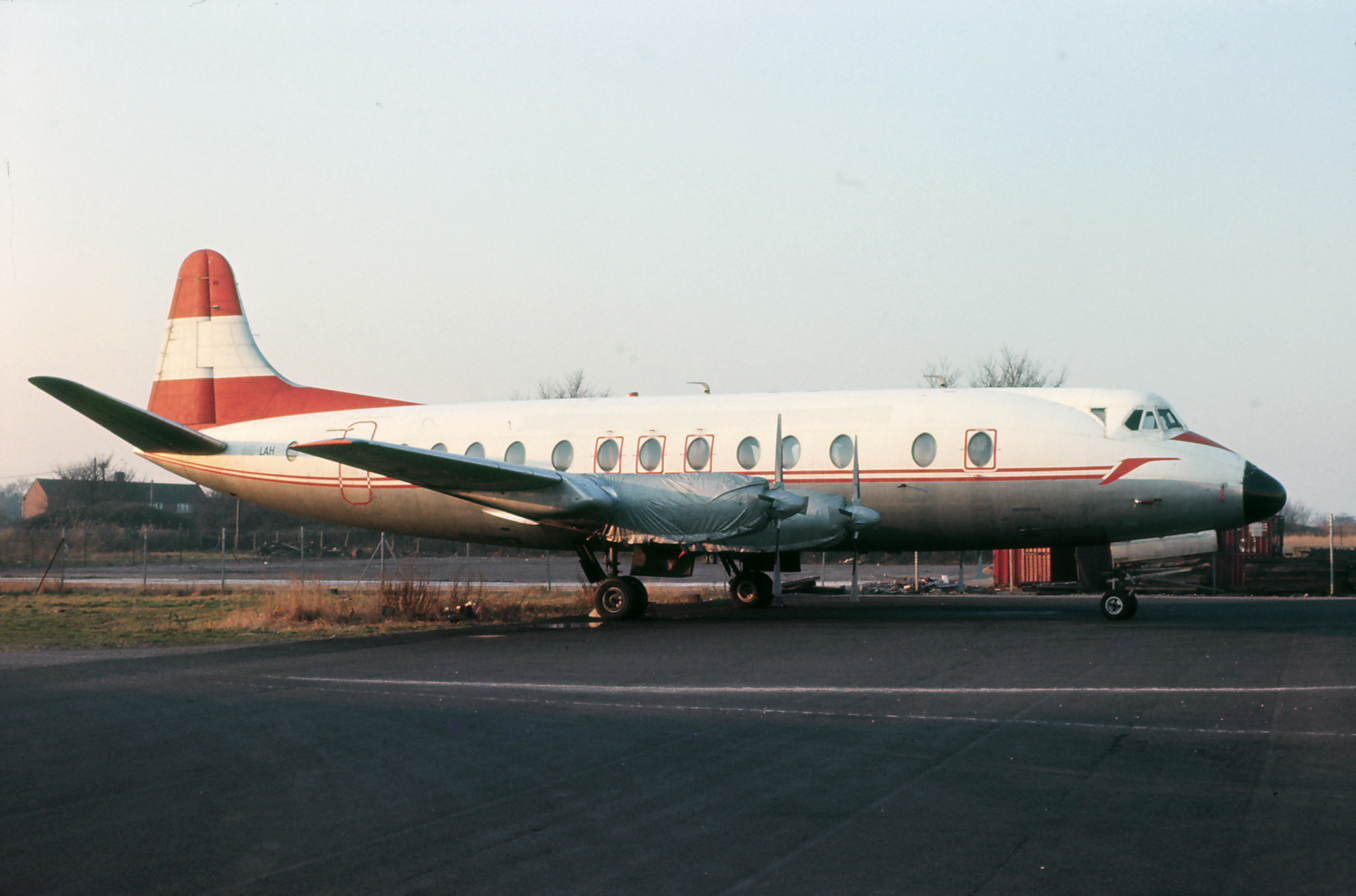
- The aircraft involved in the accident, while still in service with a previous operator in 1972

Accident
- Date: July 31, 1975
- Summary: Downdraft during landing
- Site: Taipei-Songshan Airport, Taipei

Aircraft
- Aircraft type: Vickers Viscount 837
- Operator: Far Eastern Air Transport
- Registration: B-2029
- Flight origin: Hualien Airport, Hualien County
- Destination: Taipei-Songshan Airport, Taipei
- Occupants: 75
- Passengers: 70
- Crew: 5
- Fatalities: 27
- Injuries: 48
- Survivors: 48

Far Eastern Air Transport Flight 134 was a scheduled domestic flight from Hualien Airport to Taipei-Songshan Airport. On July 31, 1975, the Vickers Viscount 837D crashed into the runway during a storm while on approach. 27 out of the 75 occupants onboard were killed on impact, there were 48 survivors all of them made it out with injuries.

It is the 3rd deadliest accident of the airline and being the 5th accident of the airline.

== Aircraft ==
- Aircraft: Vickers Viscount 837D
- MSN: 439
- Registration: B-2029

== Accident ==
While the Viscount aircraft was on approach to Songshan, the aircraft encountered bad weather including a thunderstorm which caused rain falls and low wind-shear. The aircraft then got hit by downdraft, causing the aircraft to stall and crash possibly 300m away from the threshold of the runway.

== Cause ==
The safety board concluded that the aircraft had lost control and stalled when it was hit by low wind-shear.
