= Tainan Airport =

Regional commercial airport and air base located in Tainan

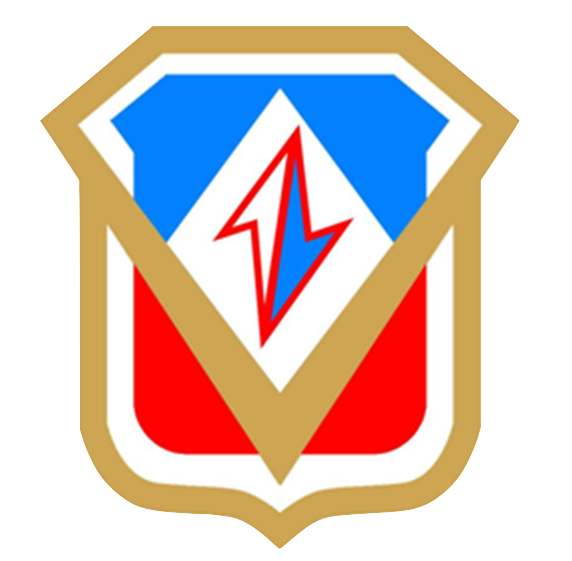
Tainan Airport Tainan Air Base 台南航空站 台南空軍基地

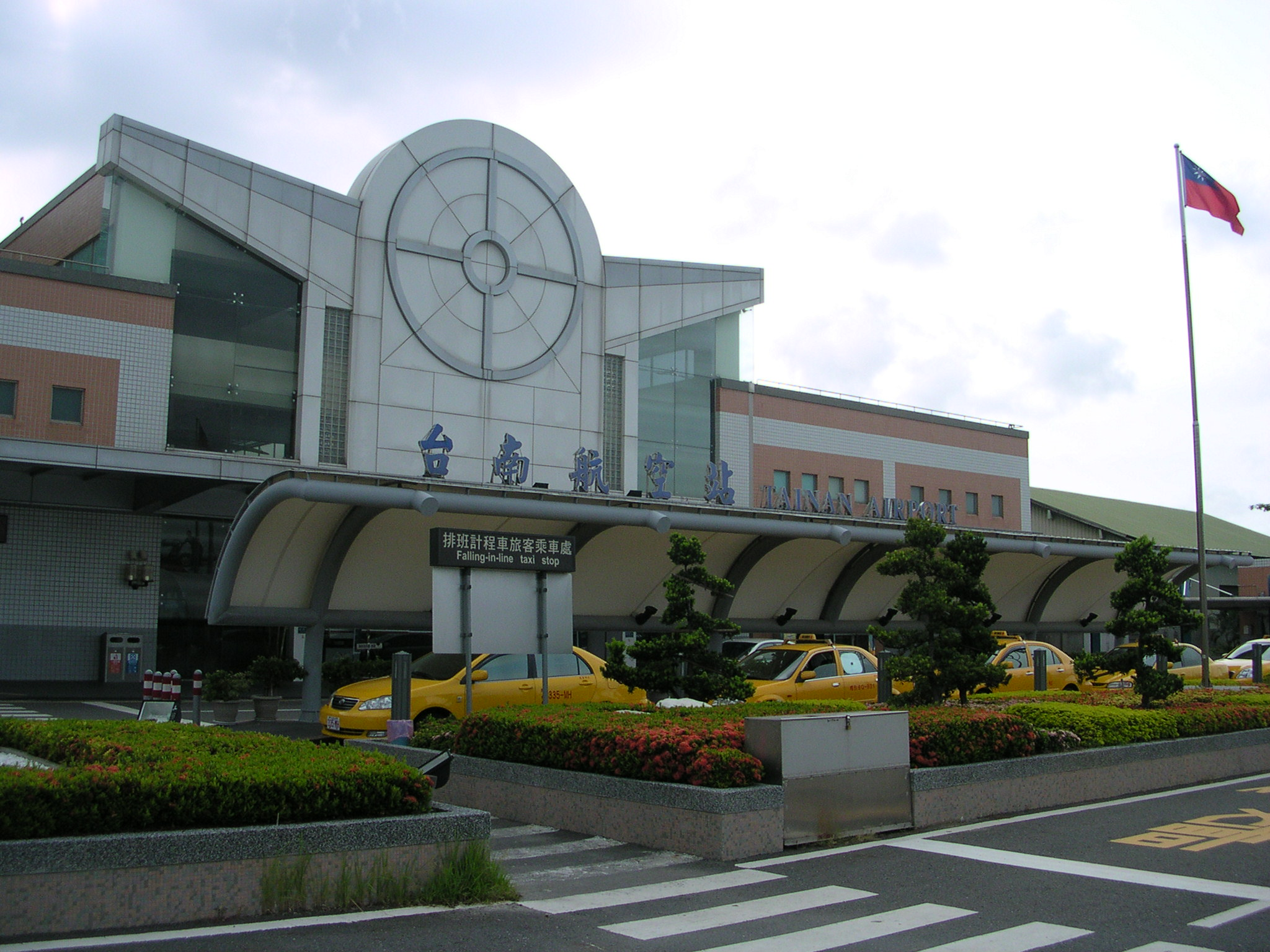
- IATA: TNN; ICAO: RCNN

Summary
- Airport type: Public/Military air base
- Operator: Civil Aeronautics Administration; Military: ROC Air Force; United States Air Force(1955-1979)
- Location: South, Tainan, Taiwan
- Elevation AMSL: 64 ft (20 m)
- Coordinates: 22°57′01″N 120°12′20″E

Map
- Location of airport in Tainan Location of airport in Taiwan

Runways
Direction	Length		Surface
Direction	m	ft	Surface
18L/36R	3,050	10,007	Concrete
18R/36L	3,050	10,007	Concrete

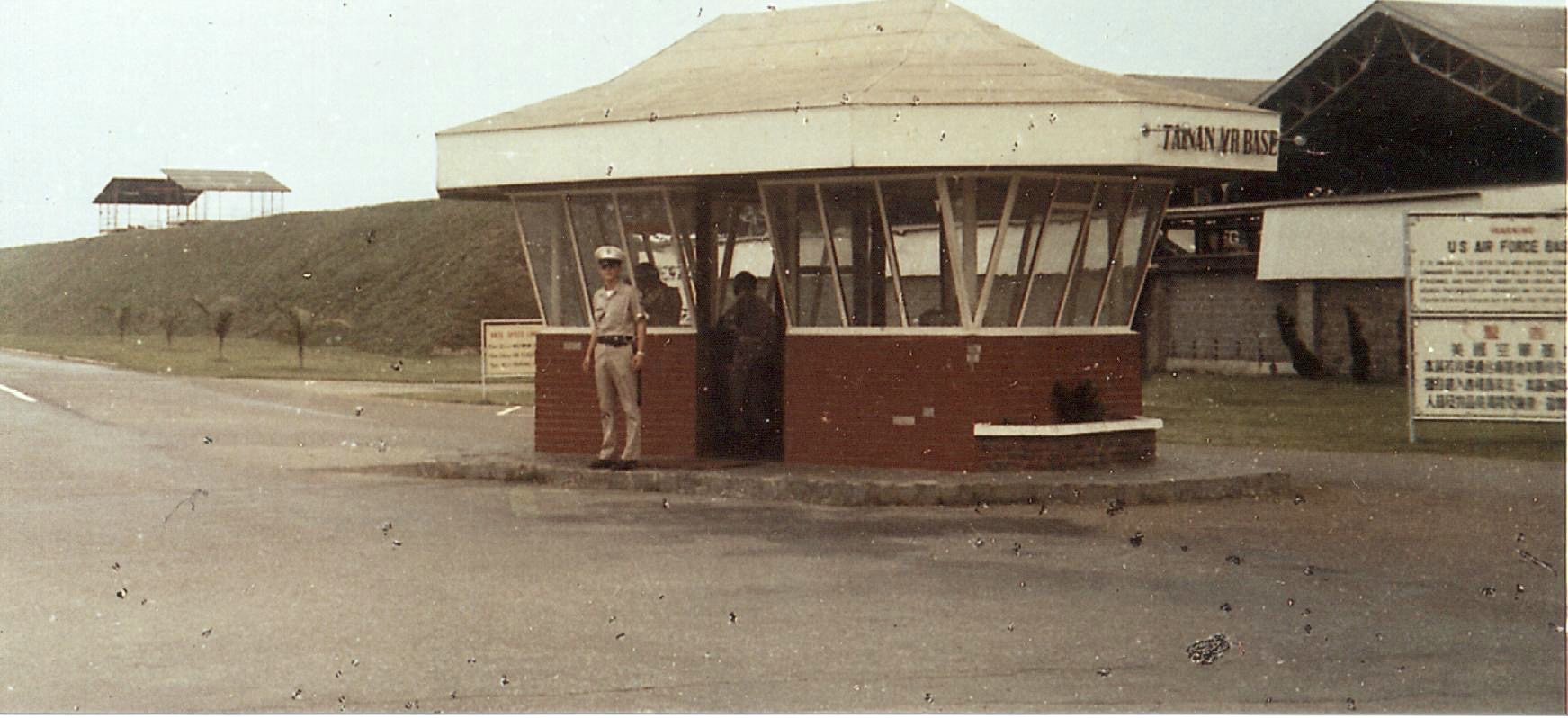
Tainan AB, USAF Main Gate in 1972

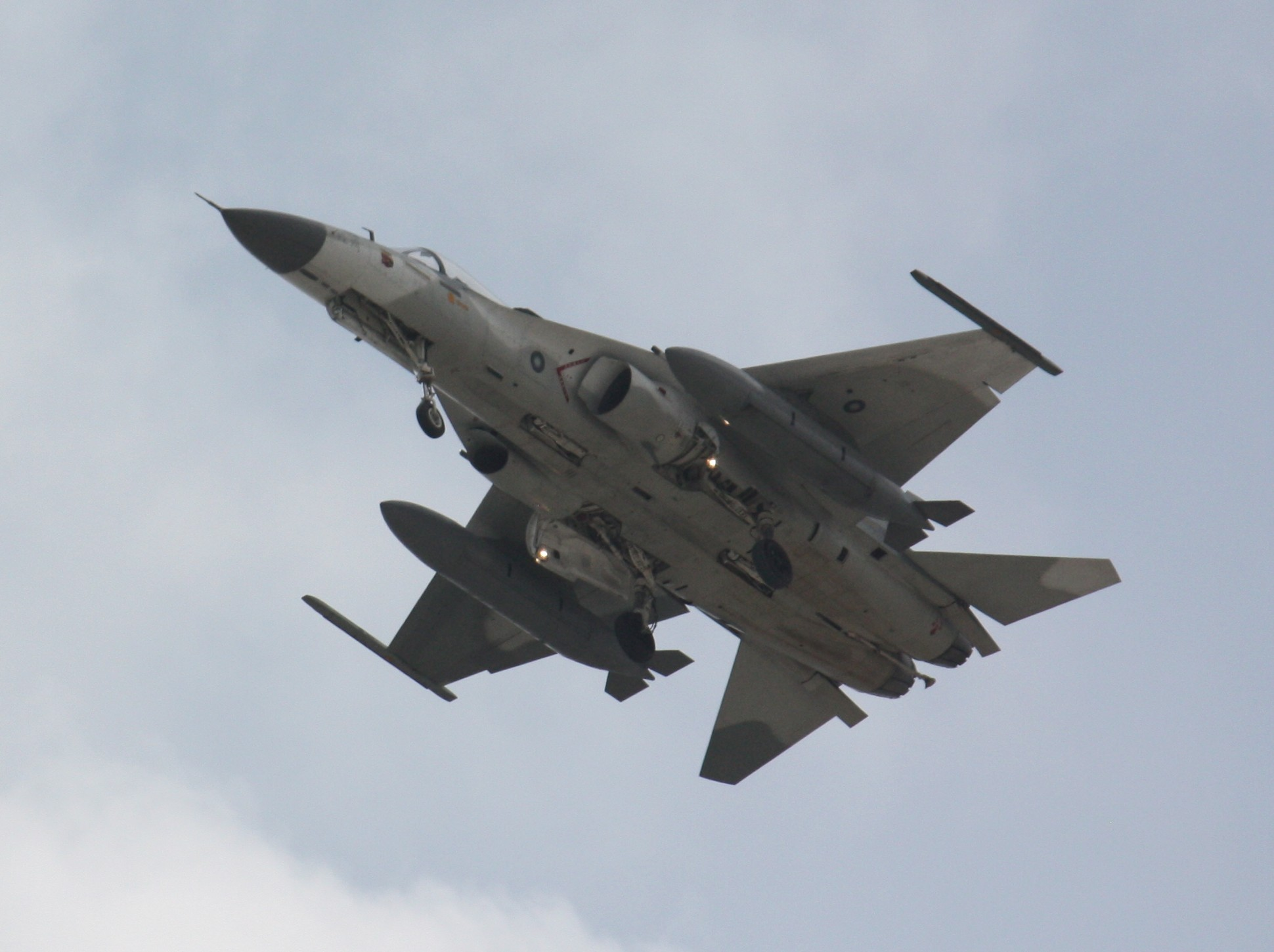
A F-CK-1 of the 1st Tactical Fighter Wing of the ROC Air Force prepares to land at Tainan Air Base (2010)

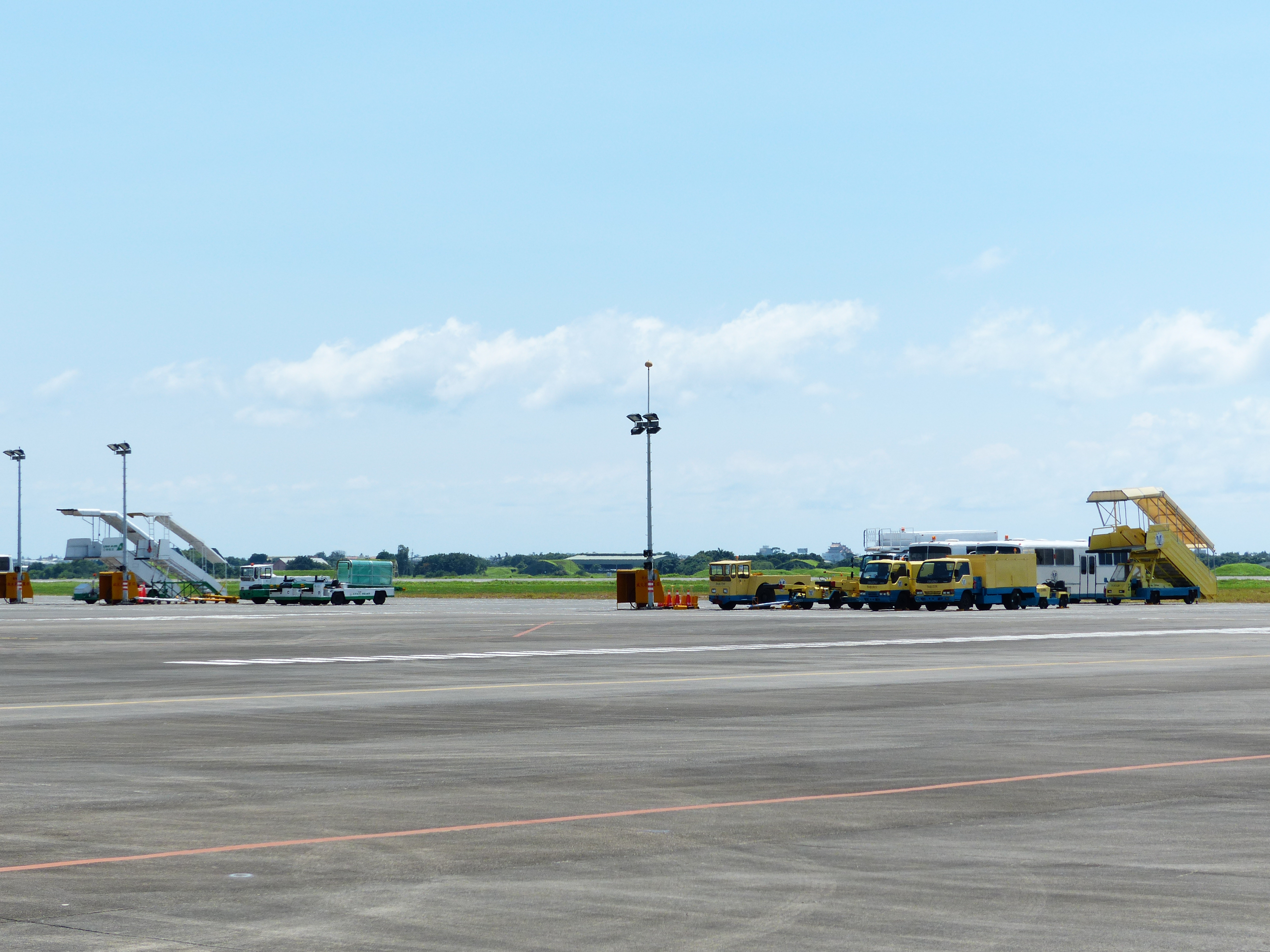
Tainan Airport runway

Tainan Airport (Chinese: 台南機場; formally "台南航空站") (IATA: TNN, ICAO: RCNN) is a commercial airport located in South District, Tainan, Taiwan. It is shared with Republic of China Air Force Tainan AFB. In January 2011, the Civil Aeronautics Administration approved the airport to handle international flights.

== History ==
=== 20th Century ===
In 1935 during Japanese rule, Tainan Airport was proposed by the Tainan Prefecture government due to the need for civil transportation in southern Taiwan. The airport was opened on June 26, 1937, with regular flights to Matsuyama Airport (modern-day Taipei Songshan Airport) operated by Japan Air Transport. After World War II broke out, this airport was converted to a base for the Tainan Air Group. During the war this airport was named Eineisho Airport by the United States Armed Forces, to distinguish it from two other, smaller airports located in what is nowadays known as Yongkang and Gueiren District.

After the Republic of China government took over Taiwan, this airport was handed over to the Republic of China Air Force while still maintaining civil flights. Between 1955 and 1979 the United States Air Force was stationed at this airport, once equipped with tactical nuclear weapons on F-4 aircraft from Clark AB with pilots from Clark's 405th Fighter Wing on alert. From 12 March - 1966 to 31 July 1974.

The 12th Fighter-Bomber Squadron Deployed from Kadena Air Base, Okinawa, to Tainan Air Base, from 27 January – 19 February 1955, 3 September – 30 November 1955, equipped with North American F-86 Sabre, 3 March to 2 April 1955, 26th Fighter-Interceptor Squadron was also deployed from Naha Air Base, Okinawa, to Tainan Air Base.

In November 1956, the 336th Fighter-Day Squadron Deployed from Kadena Air Base, Okinawa, to Tainan AB.

On 20 October 1957, the USAF 6200th Air Base Wing (also known as the Tainan Air Base Group) was activated to support the 7th Tactical Missile Squadron (later redesignated the 868th Tactical Missile Squadron which was coming from the CONUS. Lieutenant colonel Carl C. Lee became the first commander of the Tainan Air Base Group. Another redesignation on 18 August 1958 changed the unit's name to the 6214th Air Base Group). On 1958, the A Company of the 802nd Engineer Aviation Battalion, US Army Corps of Engineers was deployed to Tainan Air Force Base for infrastructure work, construction of new base buildings, and laying of new concrete runways. The 868th Tactical Missile Squadron was stationed here from 1958 to 1962, which operated MGM-1 Matadors, probably under the ultimate control of the United States Taiwan Defense Command. On 7 April 1965, the 552d Airborne Early Warning and Control Wing dispatched a Flight from McClellan Air Force Base, California to Tainan Air Base. From 8 February 1966, the 6214th Air Base Group changed the unit's name to the 6214th Combat Support Group.

From 20 November 1965, the 523rd Tactical Fighter Squadron of the 405th Fighter Wing maintained a Detachment at Tainan Air Base (Initially equipped with F-100D Super Sabre, converted to F-4D Phantom II in 1970).

The following are the units that the 405th Fighter Wing once stationed the detachment at Tainan Air Base in Taiwan：

- 523rd Tactical Fighter Squadron (Tail Code: PN) (20 November 1965 – 31 August 1973) (F-100D, F-4D)
- 90th Tactical Fighter Squadron (Tail Code: PN) (31 August 1973 – 31 July 1974) (F-4)

The 405th Fighter Wing of the U.S. Air Force sent units of the 510th Fighter Squadron equipped with F-100D Super Sabre fighters to Tainan Air Base from December 1959 to August 1967. On 13 May 1966 – 21 July 1966, the VMFA-314 and VMFA-323 of the US Marine Corps Fighter/Attack Squadrons in MCAS Iwakuni, Japan were Temporary duty assignment (TDY) to Tainan Air Base. They were supported logistically by the 6214th Combat Support Group in support of the 327th Air Division.

From 10 June 1966 - 15 December 1969, the 509th Fighter-Interceptor Squadron deployed F-102As Detachment from Clark Air Base, Philippines to Tainan Air Base.

Air Asia Corporation, headquartered at this airport, prospered during the Vietnam War due to the need for aircraft maintenance by the United States Armed Forces. During the Cold War the United States deployed nuclear weapons on Taiwan. Nuclear weapons are known to have been stored at Tainan Air Force Base until their withdrawal was ordered in 1972.

On 31 August 1973, the F-4D Detachment of the 523rd Tactical Fighter Squadron withdrew from Tainan Air Base to Clark AB Philippines, and changed to the 90th Tactical Fighter Squadron deployed a detachment to Tainan, until 31 July 1974.

On 31 July 1974, the 6214th Combat Support Group changed name to the 6214th Air Base Group.

From 1 December 1974, the 6214th Air Base Group was reorganized to the 6214th Air Base Squadron, and Tainan AB had been placed in caretaker status.

On 31 May 1975, the 6214th Air Base Squadron was dissolved.

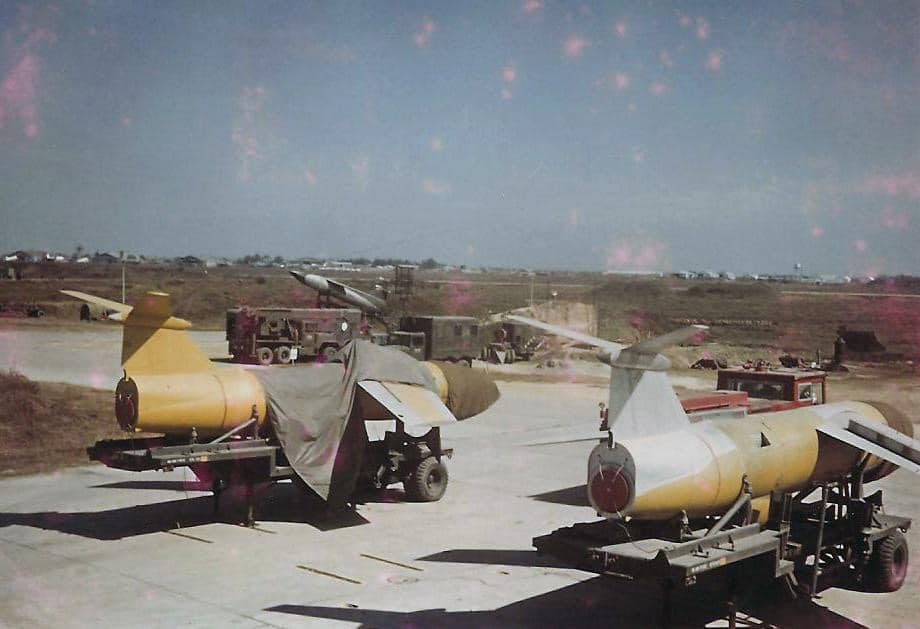
The TM-61C missile deployed at Tainan Air Base by the 868th Tactical Missile Squadron in 1959

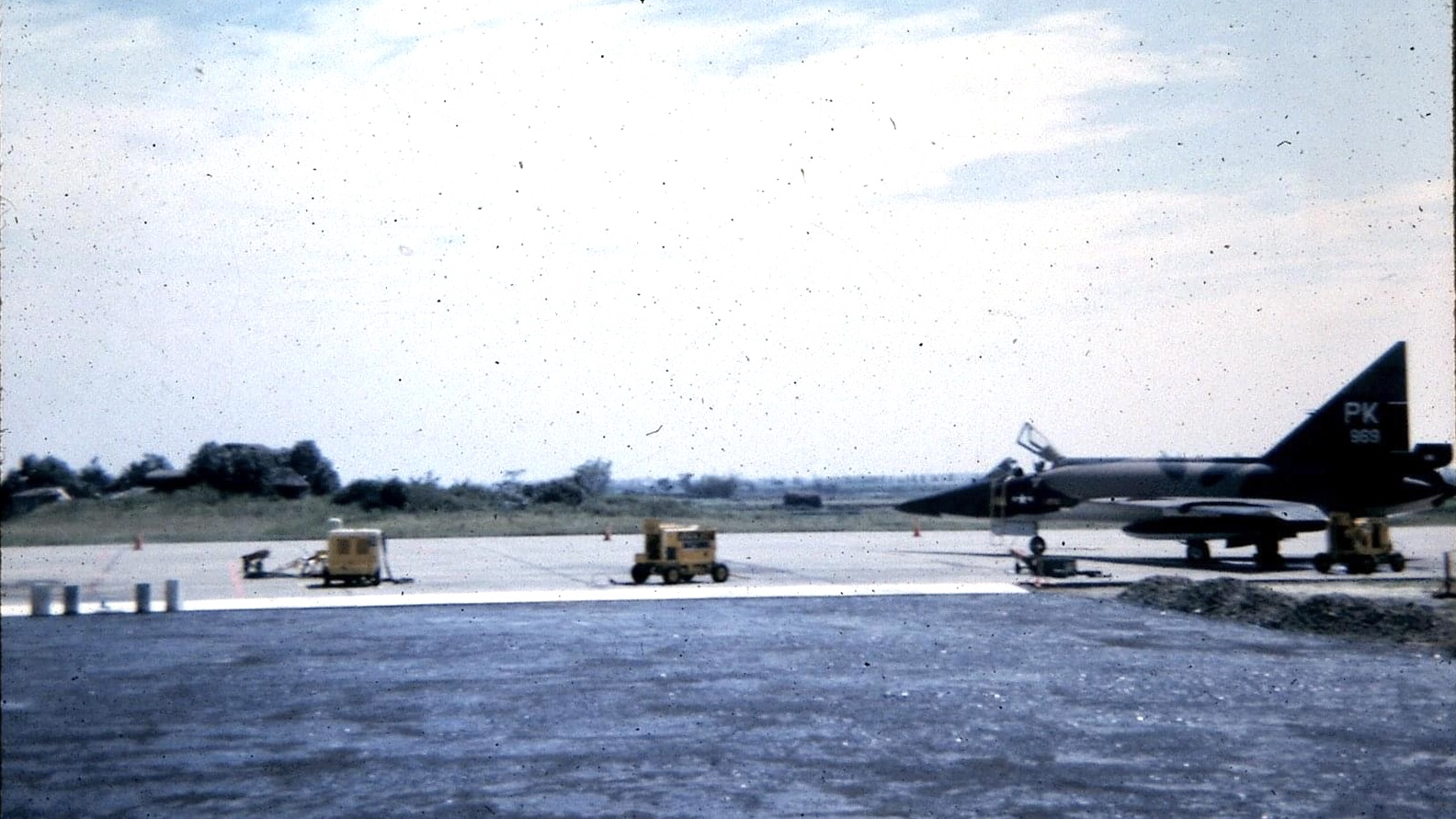
509th Fighter-Interceptor Squadron Convair F-102A-51-CO Delta Dagger 56-0968 was ready to take off from Tainan Air Base in 1969

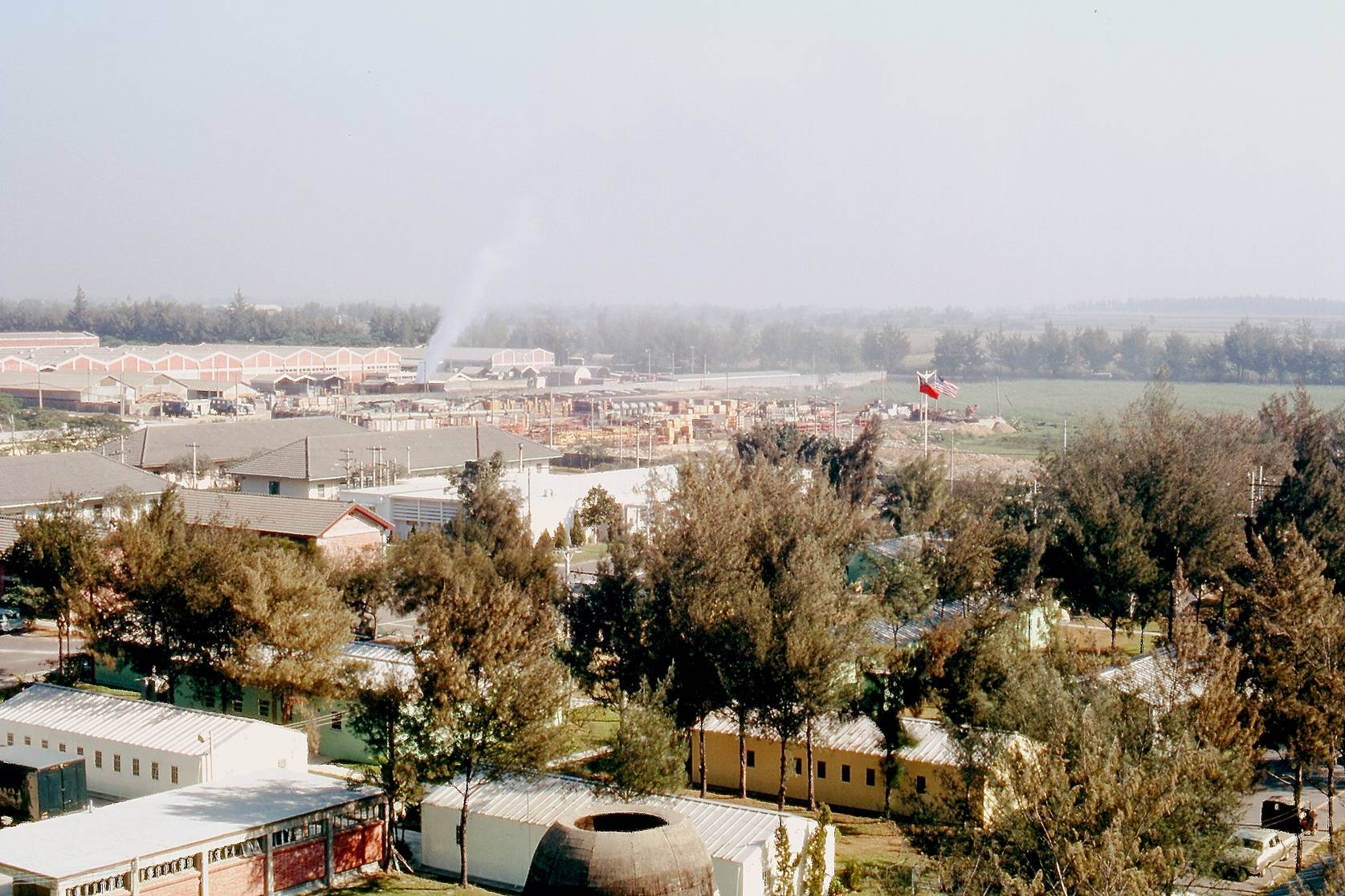
Tainan AB in 1969

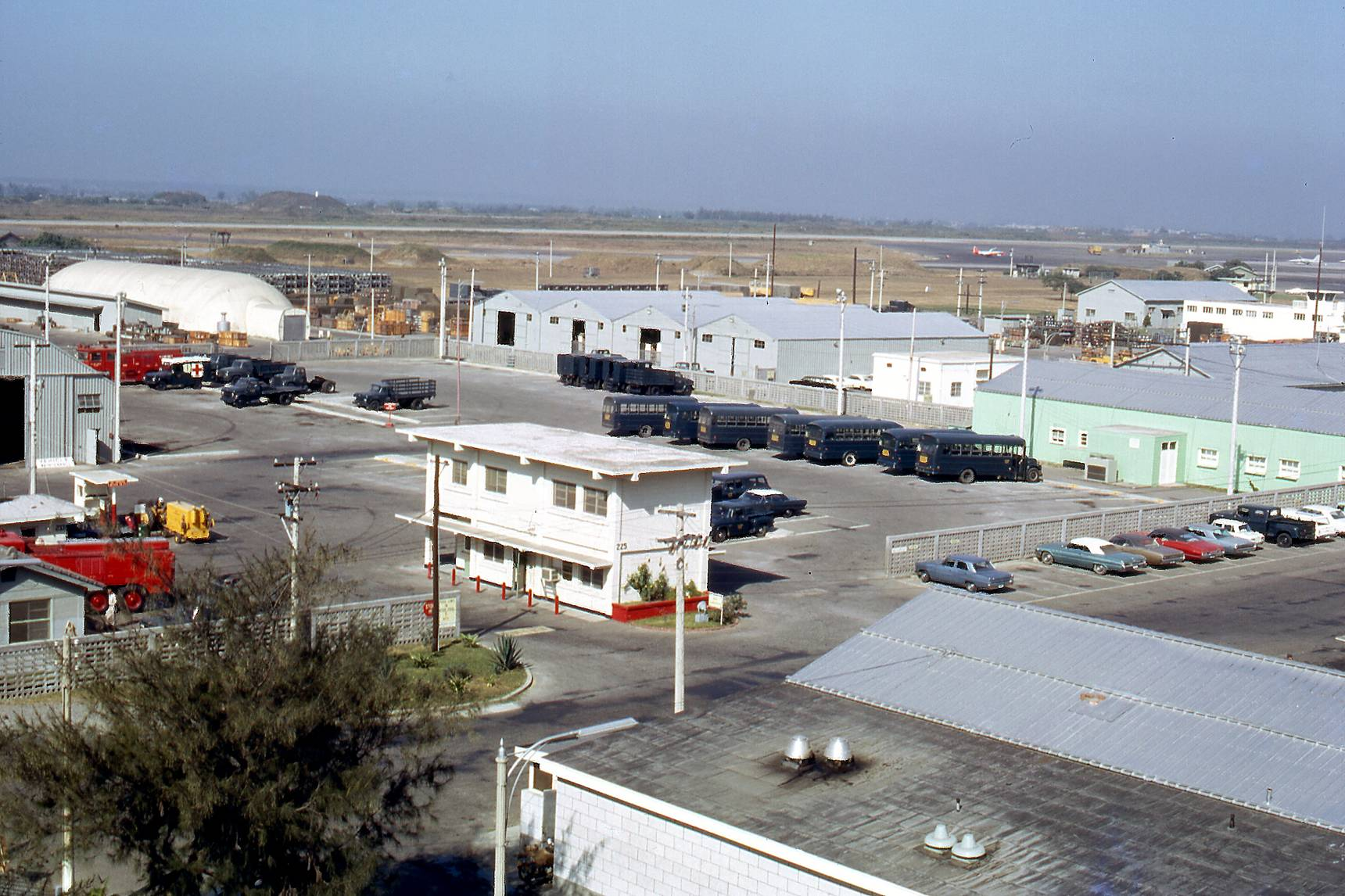
Tainan AB in 1969

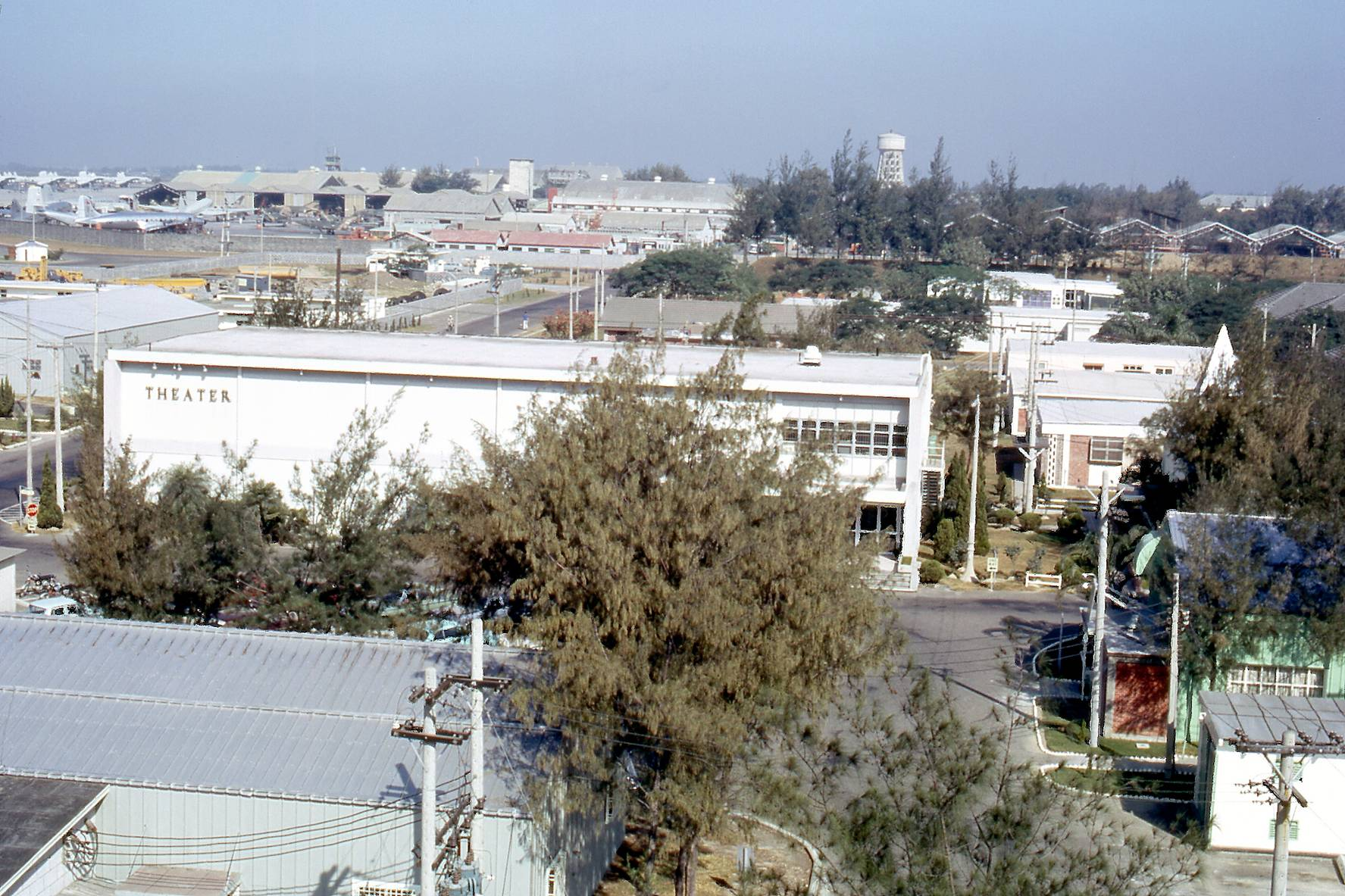
Tainan Air Base Theater with Air Asia in the background, 1969

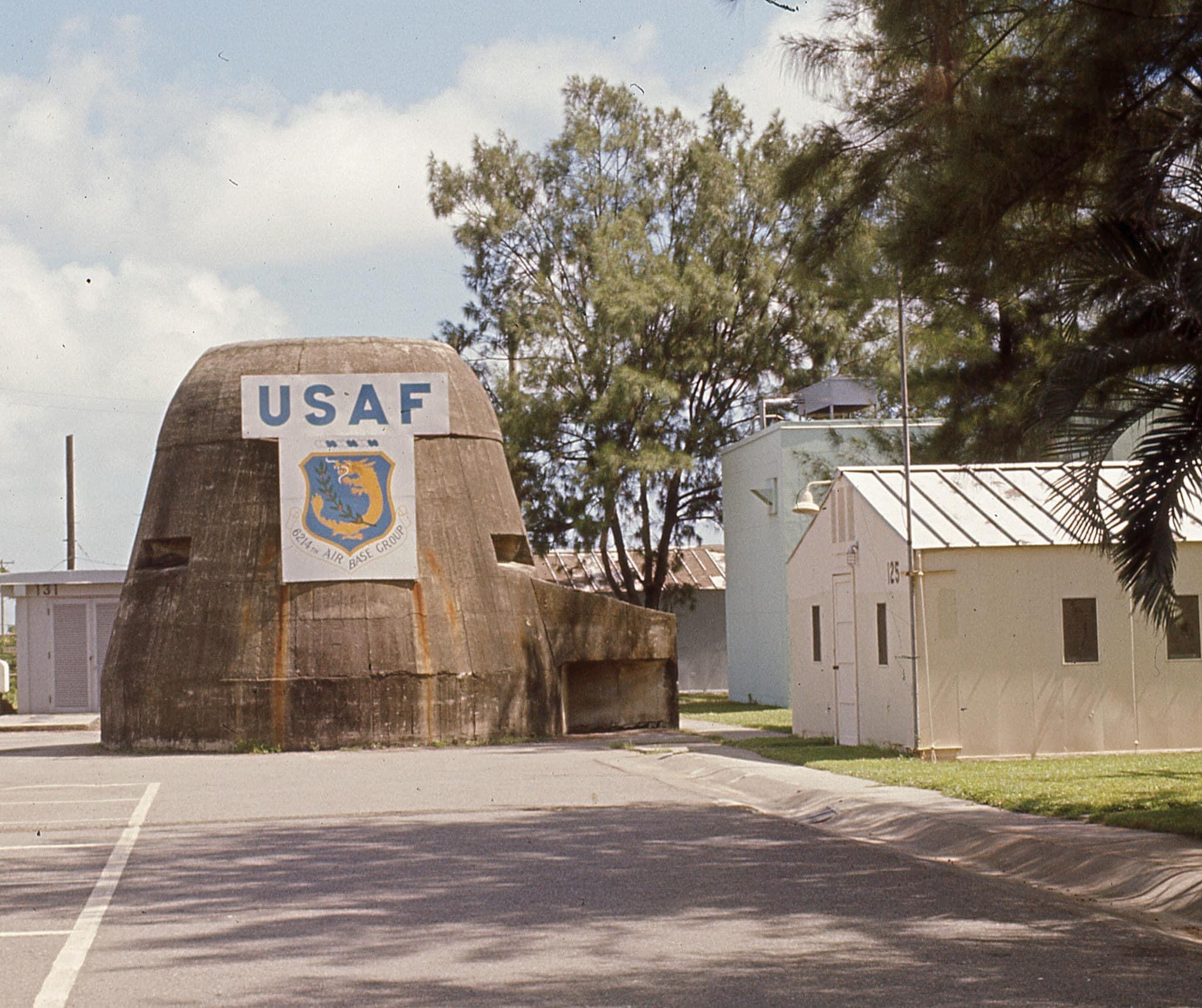
Signboard of USAF 6214th Air Base Group in Tainan AB, 1974

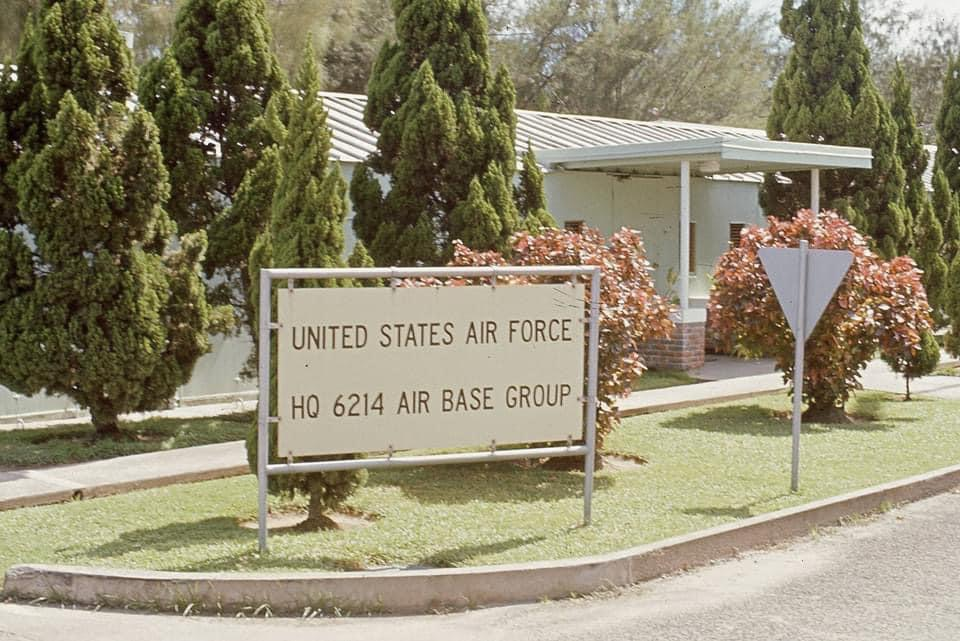
Headquarters of the 6214th Air Base Group, 1974

=== 21st Century ===
Tainan Airport was the third busiest domestic airport after Taipei Songshan Airport and Kaohsiung Airport until the Taiwan High Speed Rail was opened. With passenger numbers dropping significantly, Far Eastern Air Transport suspended its service between Tainan Airport and Taipei Songshan Airport on 1 March 2008, ending the carrier's 50-year service history at Tainan Airport. Its competitor, TransAsia Airways, also had to downgrade the aircraft it used from a jet (Airbus A320) to a turboprop (ATR 72) to maintain revenue, and finally decided to end service to the airport as of 1 August 2008.

Because of the shared use with the Air Force, the airport terminal was built quite a distance away from the airfield. Passengers disembark at the apron and board shuttle buses to the terminal. The shared use with the Air Force also means some flights have to be cancelled when the Air Force conducts exercises.

In January 2011, the Civil Aeronautics Administration approved the airport to handle international flights. The first scheduled International flights began on 18 July 2013 to Hong Kong, with a 3 times weekly service by China Airlines using Boeing 737-800s. Since March 2014 this flight's frequency has increased but the aircraft used was downgraded to smaller Embraer E-190, operated by China Airlines' subsidiary Mandarin Airlines.

== Airlines and destinations ==
While all flights as of October 2025 are domestic, the airport was previously connected to Osaka, Japan and Hong Kong through China Airlines and to Ho Chi Minh City and Hanoi in Vietnam through Vietjet and Bamboo Airways, respectively. International charter flights connected the airport to Sendai, Japan via Tigerair Taiwan, Da Nang, Vietnam via Vietjet, and Bangkok, Thailand via Thai Lion Air. International flights are slated to resume in late December 2025.

Airlines	Destinations
Tigerair Taiwan	Kumamoto, Naha
Uni Air	Kinmen, Penghu
VietJet Air	Hanoi

== Based units ==
Republic of China Air Force

- 1st Tactical Fighter Wing
  - 1st Tactical Fighter Squadron – AIDC F-CK-1 Ching-kuo
  - 3rd Tactical Fighter Squadron – AIDC F-CK-1 Ching-kuo
  - 9th Tactical Fighter Squadron – AIDC F-CK-1 Ching-kuo
  - 1st Maintenance and Supply Group
  - 1st Base Service Group
  - Magong Air Base Service Squadron
  - 1st Military police Squadron
  - 9th Military police Squadron

== Accidents and incidents ==
- On 24 February 1969, Far Eastern Air Transport Flight 104, a Handley Page Dart Herald with 36 passengers and crew board, crashed while attempting an emergency landing at Tainan. Everyone on board was killed.
- On 16 April 1977, a FEAT Douglas C-47A B-247 was damaged beyond economic repair in a landing accident.
- On 21 March 2003, TransAsia Airways flight 543 (Airbus A321 registration B-22603) on a flight from Taipei Songshan Airport to Tainan Airport, collided with a truck that was on runway 36R. None of the 175 passengers and crew were killed or injured but the two occupants in the truck were injured and the aircraft was written off.
- In 2015 two United States Marine Corps F/A-18C Hornets made an unscheduled landing at the base after one of them developed an engine anomaly in-flight. The aircraft were accommodated in an air force hangar until a C-130 full of American technicians could be flown in to check them out.

== See also ==
- Ministry of Transportation and Communications (Taiwan)
- Transport in Taiwan
- List of airports in Taiwan
