= Far Eastern Air Transport Flight 103 =

1981 aviation accident in Taiwan

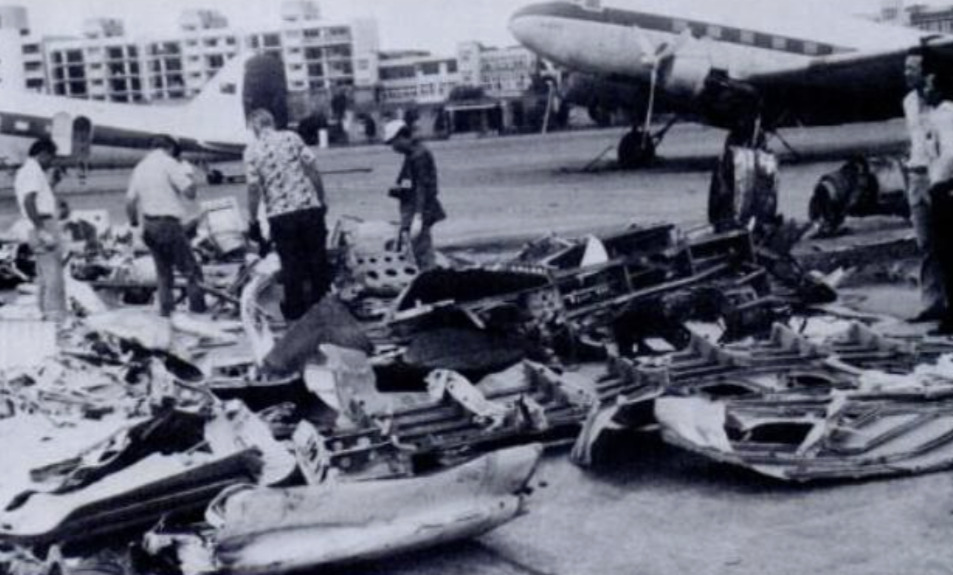
- Wreckage of the aircraft

Accident
- Date: 22 August 1981
- Summary: Metal fatigue cracking and severe corrosion, leading to explosive decompression and in-flight break-up
- Site: Near Sanyi Township, Miaoli County, Taiwan

Aircraft
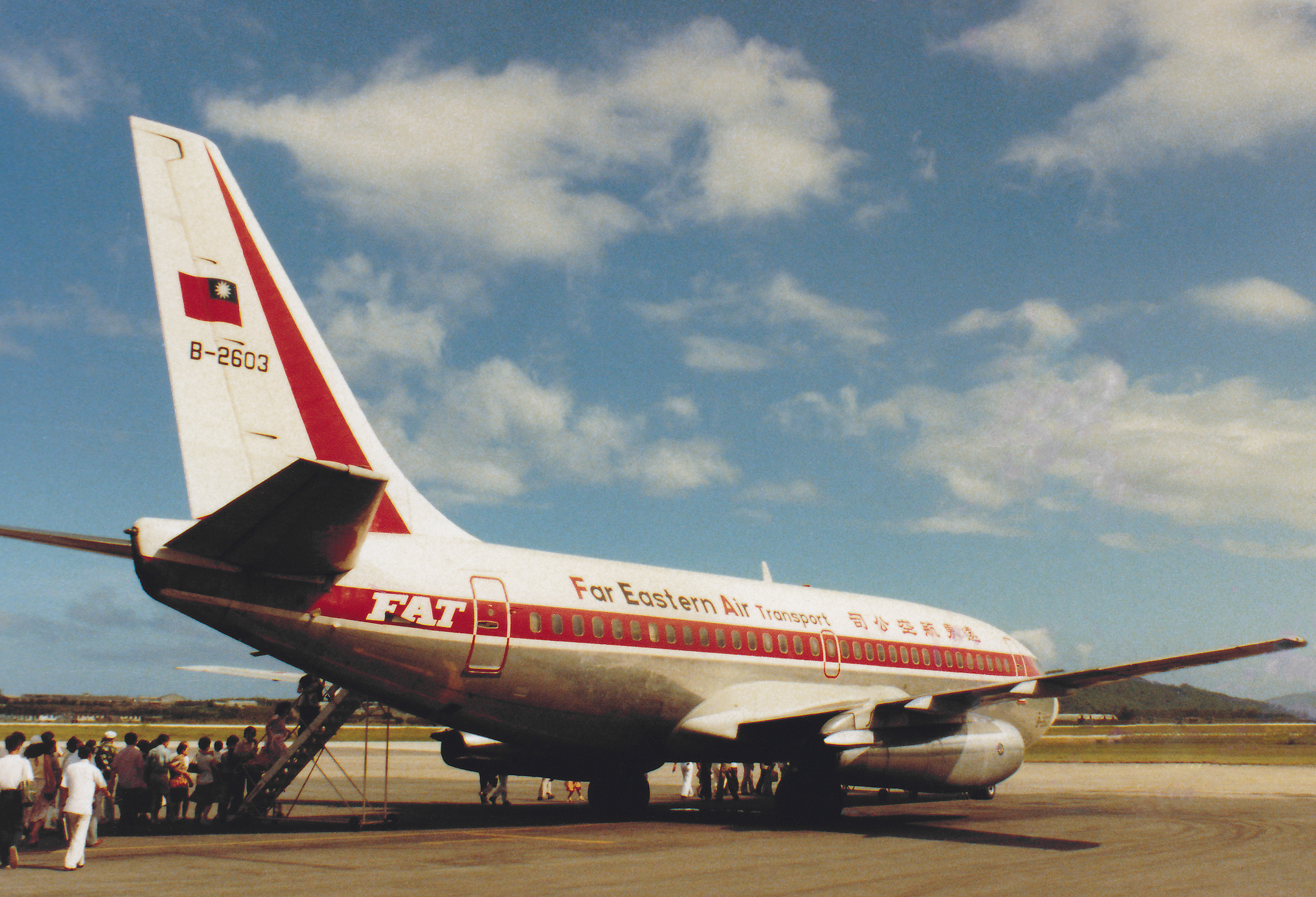
- B-2603, the aircraft involved in the accident, seen in 1980
- Aircraft type: Boeing 737-222
- Operator: Far Eastern Air Transport
- IATA flight No.: FE103
- ICAO flight No.: FEA103
- Call sign: FAR EASTERN 103
- Registration: B-2603
- Flight origin: Taipei Songshan Airport
- Destination: Kaohsiung International Airport
- Occupants: 110
- Passengers: 102
- Crew: 8
- Fatalities: 110
- Survivors: 0 (initially 1)

Far Eastern Air Transport Flight 103 was a scheduled flight from Taiwan Taipei Songshan Airport to Kaohsiung International Airport that crashed on 22 August 1981, killing all 110 people on board. The Boeing 737-200 aircraft disintegrated in midair and crashed in the township of Sanyi, Miaoli. It is also called the Sanyi Air Disaster. The crash is the third-deadliest aviation accident on the Taiwanese soil, behind China Airlines Flight 676 and China Airlines Flight 611.

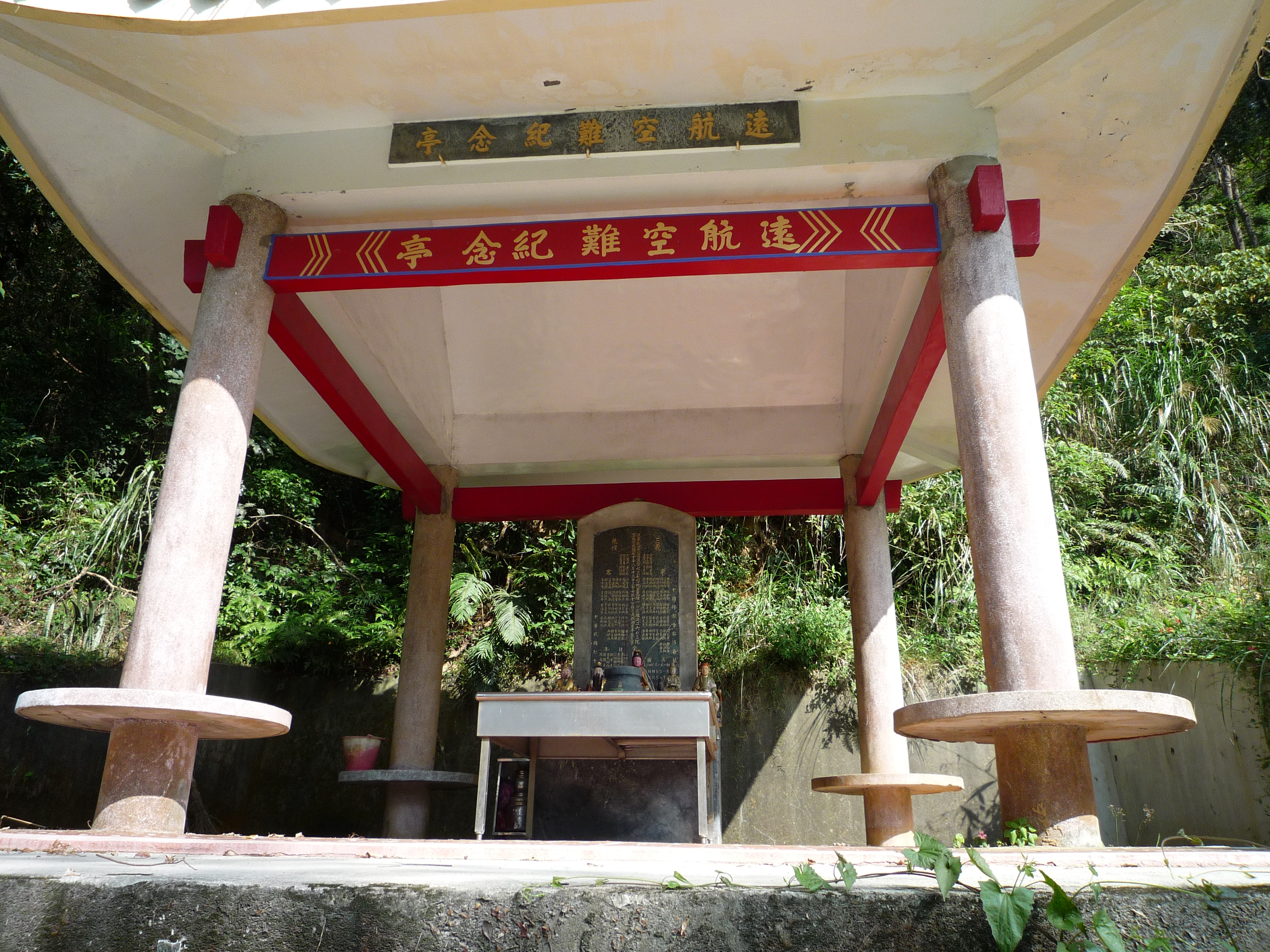
The cenotaph of the Far East Air Transport Flight 103 accident

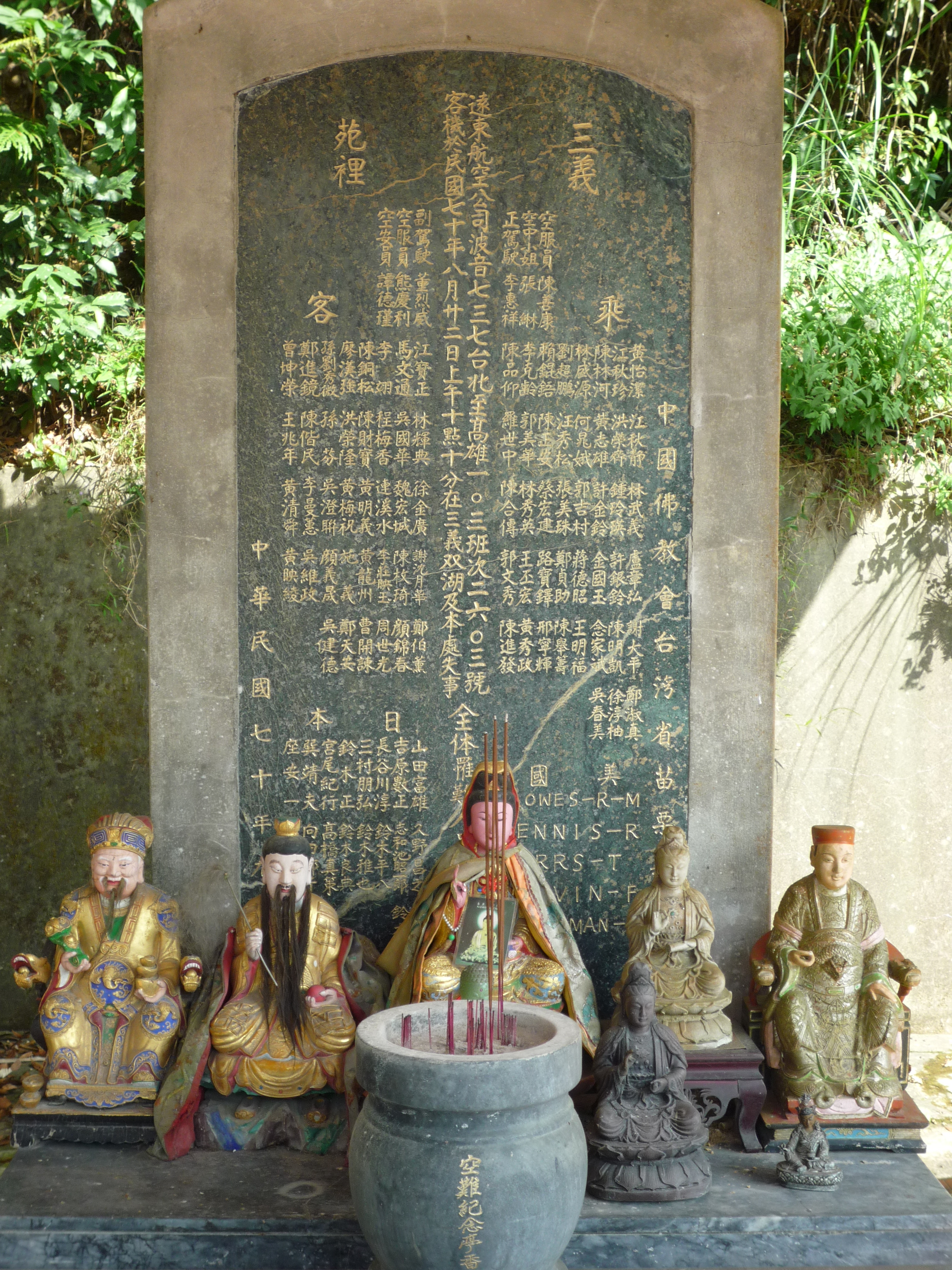
Monument listing the names of the victims

== Aircraft ==
The aircraft involved was a Boeing 737-222 registered as B-2603 with line number 151 and manufacturer's serial number 19939.

== Summary ==
The aircraft had previously lost cabin pressure on 5 August; and earlier on the day of the crash, it had departed Songshan Airport, but the crew aborted the flight 10 minutes later for the same reason. After repairs were made, the aircraft departed Songshan Airport again bound for Kaohsiung International Airport. 14 minutes after takeoff, the aircraft suffered an explosive decompression and disintegrated. The wreckage was scattered across an area 4 miles (6 km) long, located some 94 miles (151 km) south of Taipei. The nose section landed in Sanyi Township, Miaoli County. Other debris landed in the townships of Yuanli, Tongluo, and Tongxiao. Of the 110 people on board, one passenger was found alive but died on the way to a hospital; in the end, no one aboard survived. After the accident, due to it occurring in a mountainous region, road traffic was backed up. The remains of the victims were driven to the Shengxing railway station, from where they were transported by train.

== Cause ==
Although early speculation indicated that the crash was caused by an explosive device, an investigation by the Republic of China Civil Aeronautics Board concluded that severe corrosion led to a pressure-hull rupture. The severe corrosion was due to the many pressurization flight cycles the aircraft had experienced, and that cracks produced were probably undetected.

== Victims ==
| Nationality | Passengers | Crew | Total |
|---|---|---|---|
| Taiwan | 82 | 8 | 90 |
| Japan | 18 | 0 | 18 |
| United States | 2 | 0 | 2 |
| Total | 102 | 8 | 110 |

=== Notable victims ===
- Kuniko Mukōda, a Japanese TV screenwriter, was heading to Kaohsiung for a festival.

== See also ==
- Japan Air Lines Flight 123
- China Airlines Flight 611
- Aloha Airlines Flight 243
- Continental Express Flight 2574
- BOAC Flight 781
- Chalk's Ocean Airways Flight 101
