= Pelandok Airways =

Airline of Malaysia (1971–1972)

Pelandok Airways Sdn Bhd
IATA	ICAO	Call sign
BL	—	PELANDOK
- Founded: 1971
- Ceased operations: 1972
- Hubs: Subang International Airport
- Fleet size: 2
- Destinations: 3
- Parent company: Federal Land Development Authority; Far Eastern Air Transport
- Headquarters: 204B, Jalan Ampang, Kuala Lumpur, Malaysia
- Employees: 50

Pelandok Airways was a short-lived Malaysian airline which commenced operations in October 1971 through a collaboration between the Federal Land Development Authority (FELDA) and Taiwan's Far Eastern Air Transport. The airline positioned itself as a provider of low-cost flights, charter services, and cargo transportation.

The significance of Pelandok Airways lies in its innovative role in reshaping domestic air travel within Malaysia. As the revolutionising carrier to implement both low-cost and charter services, it democratised air travel, making it more accessible to a broader spectrum of travelers in the country.

Furthermore, the airline pioneered nonstop routes between Kuala Lumpur and Kota Kinabalu as well as Kuching, diverging from the standard Malaysia–Singapore Airlines itinerary that required travelers to stopover in Singapore, representing a notable improvement in travel convenience for passengers commuting to and from the Malaysian capital.

== History ==
=== Inception ===
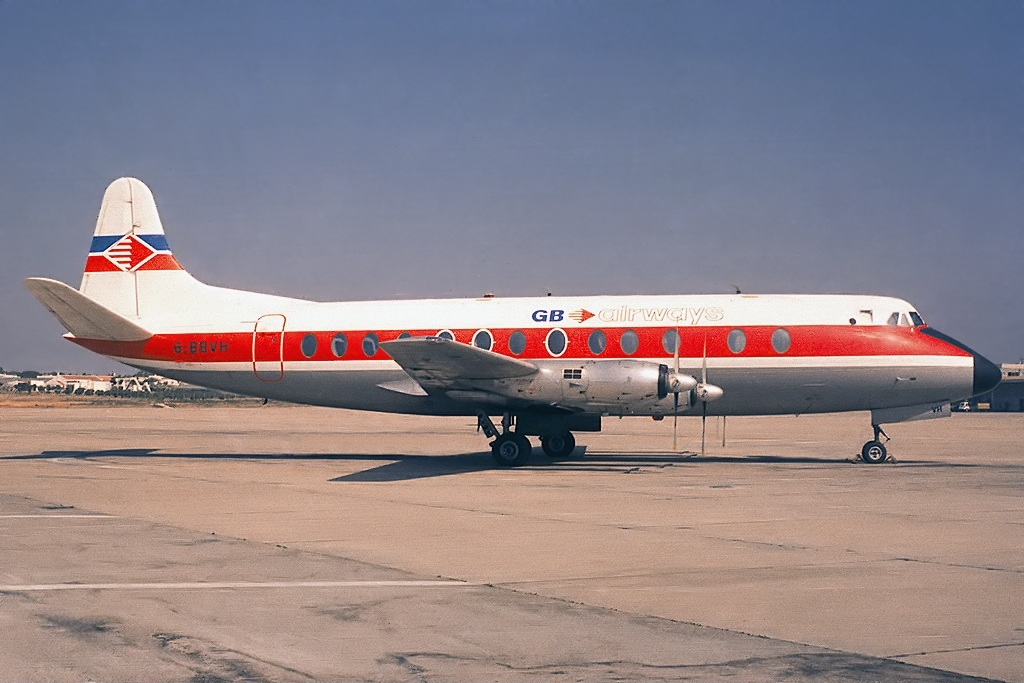
The airline operates Vickers Viscount aircraft, painted in a red cheatline, closely resembling the provided example, albeit with a minor differences on the tail, nacelle and typeface design

In October 1971, Pelandok Airways made its debut in Malaysia's aviation sector through a collaboration between the Federal Land Development Authority (FELDA) and Taiwan's Far Eastern Air Transport Corporation. During its inception, the airline joined the ranks of Malaysia's three charter companies, alongside Southern Cross Airways and Malaysian Air Charter (MAC).

Operating with a fleet of two 70-seater Vickers Viscount aircraft, Pelandok Airways spearheaded both charter and budget flights, launching direct routes from Kuala Lumpur to Kota Kinabalu in January 1972, with subsequent expansion to Kuching by June of the same year. This strategic expansion significantly improved accessibility between East Malaysia and the capital, marking a departure from the traditional Malaysia-Singapore Airlines route that mandated layovers in Singapore.

Pelandok Airways had ambitious expansion strategies in place, with plans to procure additional planes, notably two second-hand 50-seat Handley Page Dart Herald from Taiwan and Silver Kris (de Havilland Comet) from MSA (Malaysia-Singapore Airlines), the national carrier. Initially, Pelandok Airways granted flight rights to a diverse array of destinations spanning East and West Malaysia, as well as various international locations such as Indonesia, Thailand, Hong Kong, South Vietnam, Australia and other destinations.

=== Regulatory challengers ===
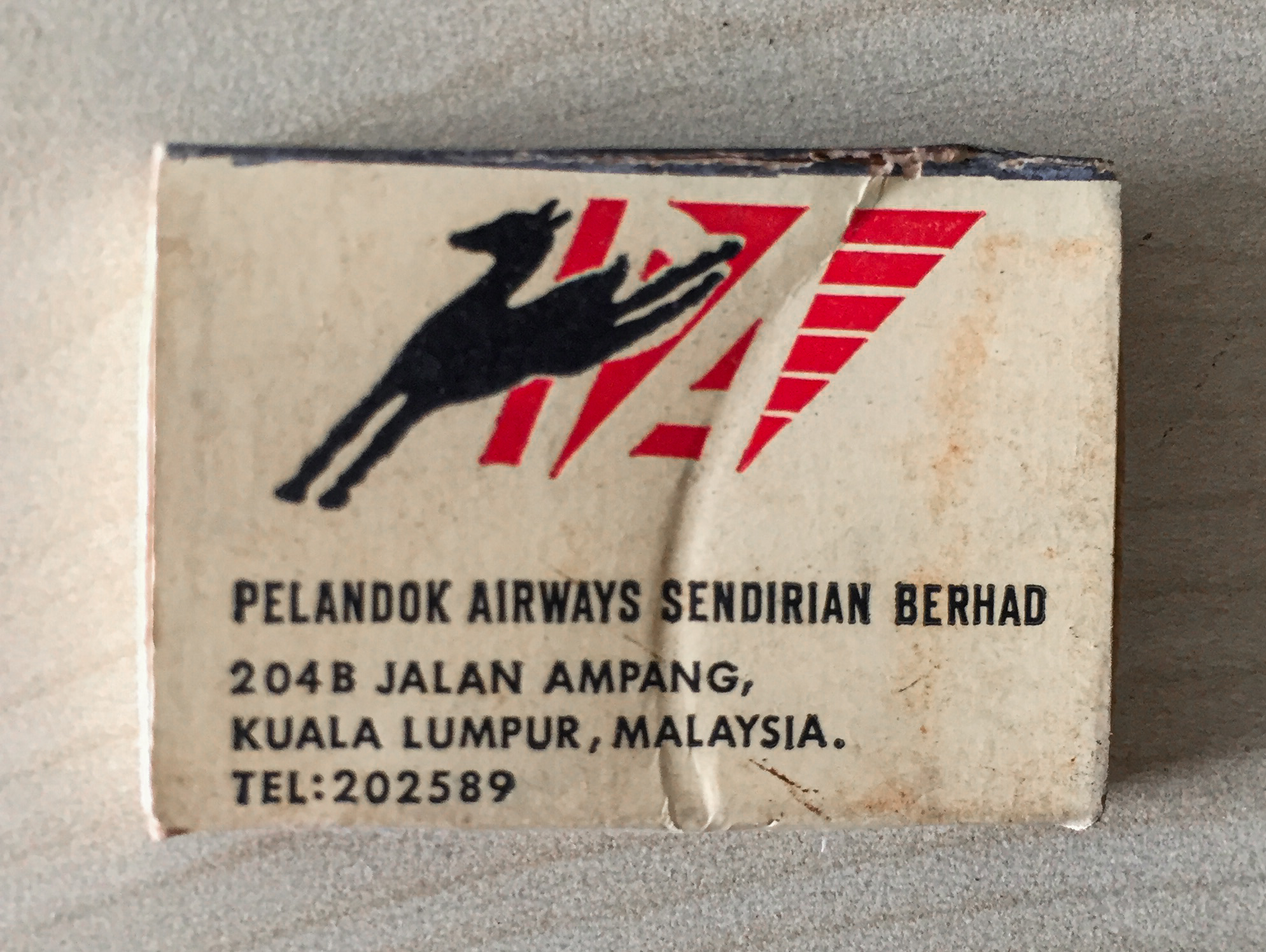
A vintage Pelandok Airways matchbox featuring its logo and headquarters address

Pelandok Airways faced significant challenges in its bid to continue operating as a secondary airline to Malaysian Airline System (MAS). The Ministry of Communication rejected the airline's appeal to renew its air charter permit, which was set to expire in 1972. Mr. On Boon Bah, the airline's secretary, announced the Ministry's decision, stating that they had no choice but to cease operations.

The Ministry's decision stemmed from several restrictions imposed on Pelandok Airways. The airline was informed that it could not operate charter services to destinations already served by MAS, as seen in the denial of the planned Pelandok Airways flight from Kuala Lumpur to Medan, a route already serviced by the national carrier, despite Pelandok Airways securing prior permission. Additionally, it was also being informed its traffic rights to areas not yet served by MAS would automatically lapse once MAS began operating in those regions.

Thus, following the restructuring of Malaysia-Singapore Airlines into Malaysia Airlines in 1972, MAS prioritized the development of its domestic network. While the introduction of a direct flight from Kuala Lumpur to Kota Kinabalu and Kuching was deemed necessary by the national carrier, the limited market size in 1972 rendered competition between two airlines on the same route unsustainable.

=== Closure ===
The closure of Pelandok Airways, following the Ministry of Communication's decision not to renew its air charter permit, marks the end of its operations. This decision, influenced by restrictions regarding overlapping routes with Malaysian Airline System (MAS), resulted in the termination of approximately 50 staff members, including pilots, eight flight attendants and other personnel. This event reflects the intricate regulatory considerations and competitive dynamics in Malaysia's aviation industry during the era.

== Branding and corporate identity ==
The logo of Pelandok Airways featured the red initials "PA" incorporated into a stylized depiction of a black mouse-deer silhouette, honoring the airline's Malay namesake pelandok.

== Former fleet ==
As of its closure in July 1972, Pelandok Airways maintained a fleet of two aircraft:

Pelandok Airways
Aircraft	Total	Passengers
Vickers Viscount	2	70

== Destinations served ==
In the past, Pelandok Airways offered scheduled flight services to the following destinations:

Country	City	Airport	Notes	Reference
Malaysia	Kota Kinabalu	Kota Kinabalu International Airport		
Malaysia	Kuala Lumpur	Subang International Airport	Base	
Malaysia	Kuching	Kuching International Airport		
