= Penghu Airport =

Domestic airport in Huxi, Taiwan

Penghu Airport Magong Air Force Base 澎湖機場 馬公空軍基地 Pénghú Jīchǎng
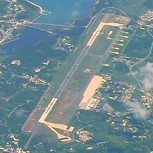
- IATA: MZG; ICAO: RCQC

Summary
- Airport type: Public / Military
- Owner: Republic of China Air Force
- Operator: Civil Aeronautics Administration
- Serves: Magong
- Location: Huxi Township, Penghu County, Taiwan
- Opened: 1 August 1977; 49 years ago
- Built: 1957; 69 years ago
- Coordinates: 23°34′00″N 119°37′48″E
- Website: www.mkport.gov.tw/English/Main/index.aspx

Map
- Location of airport in Penghu County Location of airport in Taiwan

Runways
Direction	Length		Surface
Direction	m	ft	Surface
02/20	3,000	9,843	Concrete

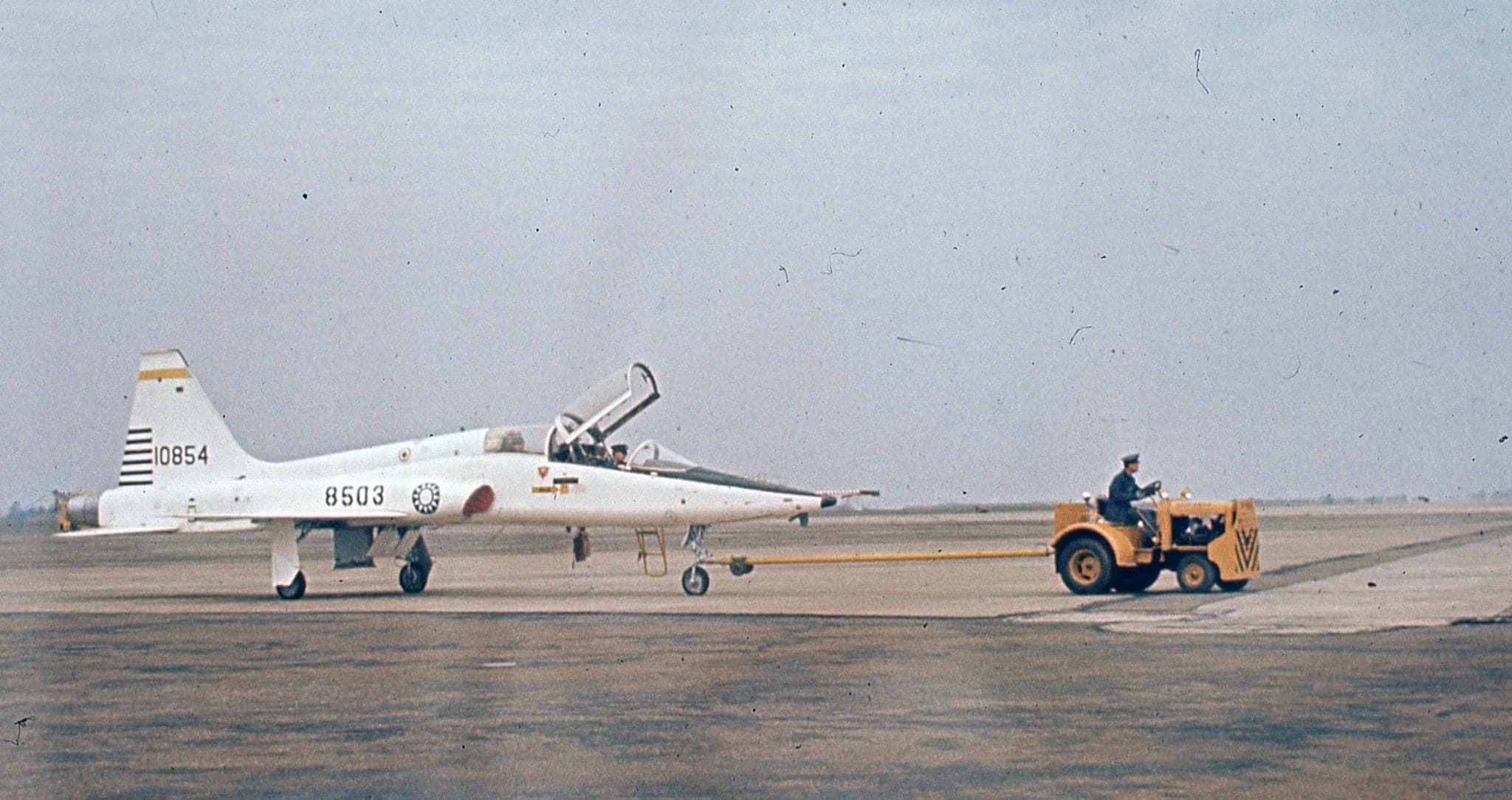
In 1974, an F-5A/B Freedom Fighter of the Republic of China Air Force was at Makung Air Base

Penghu Airport (IATA: MZG, ICAO: RCQC), formerly Magong Airport (Chinese: 澎湖機場; pinyin: Pénghú Jīchǎng; Pe̍h-ōe-jī: Phênn-ôo Ki-tiû), is a domestic airport in Huxi, Penghu County, Taiwan. Handling 2,380,265 passengers in 2017, it is the fifth-busiest airport in Taiwan. The ROC Air Force's Magong Air Base is also located here.

== History ==
Initially based in Penghu was Wude Airfield, which became obsolete by the 1950s, as the Republic of China Air Force required a larger airfield for jet aircraft and heavier transports. Subsequently, Penghu Airport opened in 1957 with a focus on military personnel and cargo transportation. The construction of the new terminal began in 1966 and was subordinate to Kaohsiung Airport. The airport was officially established as a Type C airport and began operations on 1 August 1977.

In August 2004, the second phase of a new terminal was completed, which included the waiting room and terminal building. In June 2015, a new instrument landing system at the airport was inaugurated which was expected to improve safety, reducing the visibility requirement for the runway from 1,600 to 1,200 metres.

On 30 July 2018, the Civil Aviation Administration announced that Magong Airport would be renamed to Penghu Airport on 9 August 2018.

On 22 September 2020, President Tsai Ing-wen visited Penghu Magong Air Force base and praised the "heroic performance" of the pilots and crews who had intercepted and driven away Chinese (PRC) aircraft over the weekend.

== Airlines and destinations ==
Airlines	Destinations
Daily Air	Qimei
Mandarin Airlines	Kaohsiung, Taichung, Taipei–Songshan
Uni Air	Chiayi, Kaohsiung, Kinmen, Taichung, Tainan, Taipei–Songshan

== Statistics ==
Busiest routes from Penghu in 2018
Rank	City	Passengers
1	Taipei–Songshan	1,036,535
2	Kaohsiung	838,439
3	Taichung	435,211
4	Tainan	148,407
5	Chiayi	39,441

== Accidents ==
- On 5 June 1972, C-130E 62-1805, c/n 3759, of the 37th Tactical Airlift Squadron, loaned to the 374th Tactical Airlift Wing, USAF – crashed in sea near Makung, Pescadores Islands, after suffering landing gear explosion while in traffic pattern. Pilot retracted landing gear while brake assembly was overheated. Denied sufficient cooling air after retraction into well, the port aft wheel assembly exploded damaging wheel well bulkhead, rupturing several hydraulic lines, the fluid from which was then ignited by the hot components resulting in loss of control of the aircraft.
- On 16 February 1986, China Airlines Flight 2265 crashed during a go-around killing all 13 on board, the aircraft was also involved in China Airlines Flight 831 which was hijacked on 9 March 1978.
- On 23 July 2014, TransAsia Airways Flight 222 crashed during a second attempt landing during bad weather. The flight originated from Kaohsiung International Airport. The ATR 72-500 was carrying 58 passengers. 11 survived the initial crash, but one succumbed to their injuries during the following days. On the ground, 5 were injured and two homes caught fire due to the crash.

== See also ==
- Civil Aviation Administration (Taiwan)
- Transportation in Taiwan
- List of airports in Taiwan
