= Songshan Airport =

Secondary airport serving Taipei, Taiwan

Taipei Songshan Airport Songshan Air Force Base 臺北松山機場 空軍松山基地
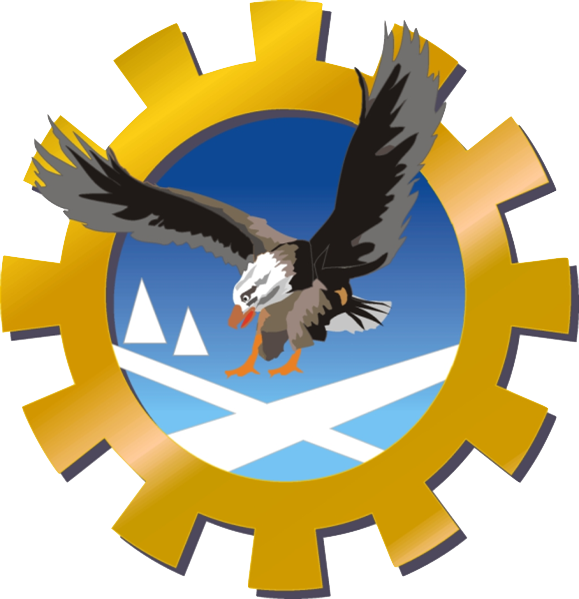

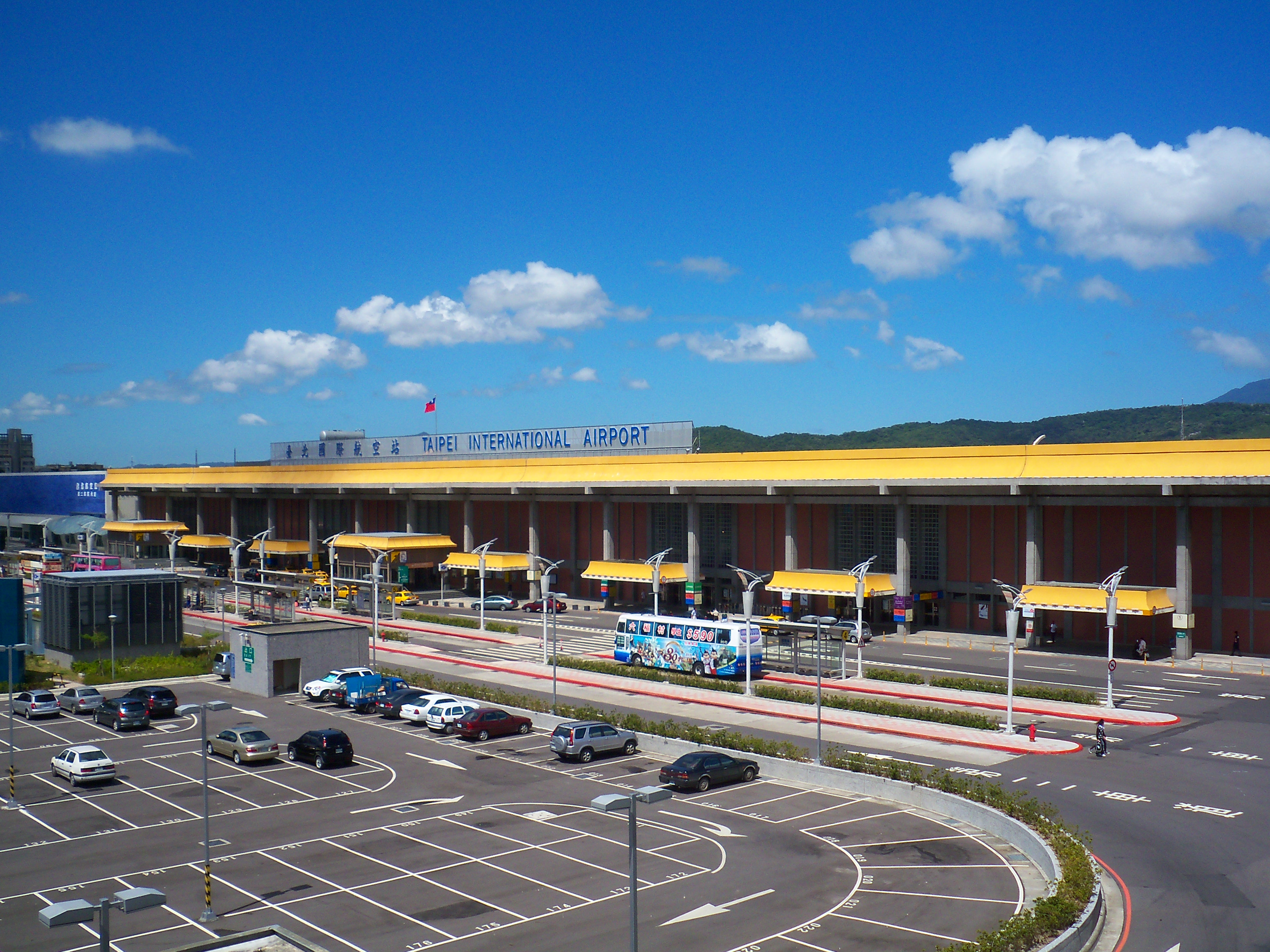
- IATA: TSA; ICAO: RCSS

Summary
- Airport type: Public / military
- Owner: Civil Aeronautics Administration; Ministry of National Defense
- Serves: Taipei–Keelung metropolitan area
- Location: Songshan, Taipei, Taiwan
- Opened: 16 April 1950; 76 years ago
- Hub for: Mandarin Airlines; UNI Air
- Focus city for: China Airlines; EVA Air
- Built: 28 March 1936; 90 years ago
- Elevation AMSL: 5 m (16 ft)
- Coordinates: 25°04′10″N 121°33′06″E
- Website: www.tsa.gov.tw

Map
- Location of airport in Taipei Location of airport in Taiwan

Runways
Direction	Length		Surface
Direction	m	ft	Surface
10/28	2,605	8,547	Paved

Statistics (2024)
- Number of passengers: 5,429,862 ▲7.16%
- Aircraft movement: 58,056
- Total cargo (metric tonnes): 47,132.9
- Sources: Civil Aeronautics Ministry WAD

Taipei Songshan Airport
- Traditional Chinese: 臺北松山機場 or 台北松山機場
- Simplified Chinese: 台北松山机场
Transcriptions
Standard Mandarin
- Hanyu Pinyin: Táiběi Sōngshān Jīchǎng
- Bopomofo: ㄊㄞˊ ㄅㄟˇ ㄙㄨㄥ ㄕㄢ ㄐㄧ ㄔㄤˇ
Hakka
- Pha̍k-fa-sṳ: Thòi-pet Tshiùng-sân Kî-chhòng
Southern Min
- Hokkien POJ: Tâi-pak Siông-san Ki-tiûⁿ

Taipei Songshan Airport (IATA: TSA, ICAO: RCSS) is a city airport and military airbase located in Songshan District, Taipei, Taiwan. The airport covers an area of 182 hectares (450 acres).

The civilian section of Songshan Airport has scheduled flights to domestic destinations in Taiwan and international destinations including Tokyo, Seoul, and select cities in China. Songshan serves only a small portion of the international flights for Taipei compared to the larger Taoyuan International Airport which replaced Songshan as Taipei's main airport in 1979. Songshan Airport is also the base of certain Republic of China Air Force units as part of the Songshan Air Force Base. The Songshan Base Command's main mission is to serve the president and vice president of Taiwan.

== History ==
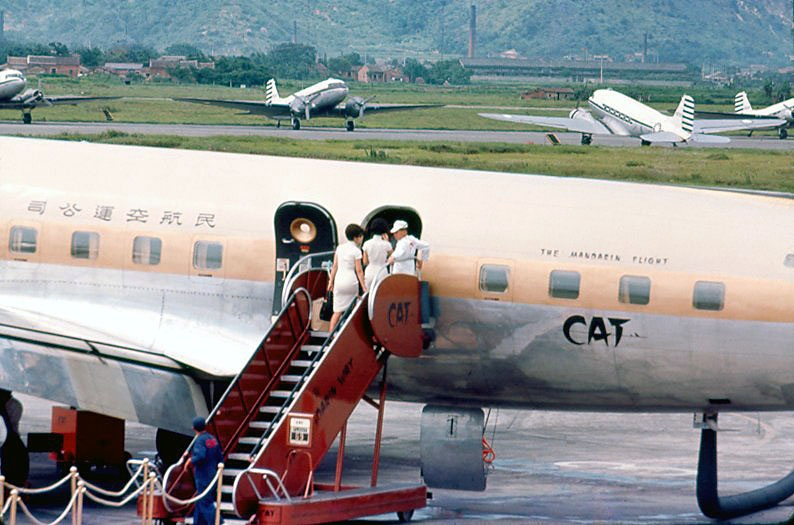
Civil Air Transport flight at Songshan Airport in 1966

The airport was built on 28 March 1936 during Japanese rule with its origins as a Japanese military airbase, the Taihoku Airfield (Japanese: 臺北飛行場, Hepburn: Taihoku Hikōjō), also known as Matsuyama Airfield (松山飛行場). In 1937, Matsuyama Airfield was occupied by the Japanese Navy's Kanoya Air Group and its Type 96 G3M bombers for bombing positions on Chinese positions. On August 14, 1937, an 18-bomber mission launched from Matsuyama Airfield targeted Jianqiao Airfield in Zhejiang Province and Guangde Airfield in Anhui Province, both in China. The raid was intercepted by Chinese fighter aircraft, resulting in the loss of four bombers without any casualties on the Chinese side. This date was later celebrated as Air Force Day in China. In 1944, the Japanese Army's 37th Kyoiku Hikotai, a training unit equipped with Ki-61 fighters, was established at Matsuyama. Many of its instructors later engaged in combat against American forces over Taiwan and Japan during the war's final months. From March to August, 1945, the US Army Far East Air Forces bombed the airfield, with the last mission on 24 August using B-24 heavy bombers.

After World War II, in 1946, it was taken over by the Republic of China Air Force, and renamed to Songshan Airport. Before the end of the Chinese Civil War and the establishment of the People's Republic of China, the airport provided flight routes between Shanghai and Taipei, occasionally via Fuzhou.

Shared military and civilian use—both domestic and international—began on 16 April 1950 in the reconstructed Civil Aeronautics Administration Taipei Airport (交通部民用航空局台北航空站). Domestic destinations have been Kaohsiung, Hualien, Taichung, Penghu, and Tainan. The first international destinations were Seattle, Tokyo, Busan, Manila, Bangkok, and Hong Kong. The first international airlines included Northwest Airlines, Pan Am, and Hong Kong Airways (now Cathay Pacific). Later, the airport became too small to handle an increased number of passengers, even after a series of expansions. This later worsened when new wide-body jets became common at the airport. Therefore, all international activities were relocated to Taoyuan International Airport (then known as Chiang Kai-shek International) after its inauguration on 26 February 1979. Consequently, the passenger load at the airport dropped from 6.2 million in 1978 to 2.9 million in 1979 (a 53% decrease). At its peak in 1997, the airport handled over 15.3 million passengers annually.

Service to Taichung and Chiayi was stopped in mid-2007 after the load factor dropped significantly due to the Taiwan High Speed Rail's start of revenue service in January 2007. Passenger volume decreased from 6.7 million in 2006 to 4.4 million in 2007 (a 34% decrease). Also due to the opening of the high speed rail line, on 1 March 2008, Uni Air suspended its service to Kaohsiung, while Far Eastern Air Transport suspended its service to Tainan. TransAsia Airways decided to stop flights to Tainan and Kaohsiung after 1 August 2008.

In early 1999 when the construction of Taipei 101 had just started, Taiwan's Civil Aeronautics Administration changed this airport's certain SID and STAR procedures to avoid possible collision with the building. The 677-meter Fuxing North Road Underground Passage (復興北路車行地下道) was constructed between 1997 and 2006 under this airport's runway to link the north and south side of this airport.

Regular cross-strait charter flights to China started on 4 July 2008, with Songshan receiving the majority of flights. Direct flights to China were an issue of contention. Then-mayor Ma Ying-jeou had been pressing to make Songshan Airport Taipei's main International terminal, citing that its location close to the city center would make it preferable for business travelers. However, building height restrictions around the airport raised concerns about flight safety, blocking of radio communications, noise pollution, and a reduced number of flights.

The continuing growth of Taipei City means that Songshan airport is situated in the heart of downtown Taipei. Compared to Taiwan Taoyuan International Airport, Songshan Airport saves travelers about 30 minutes due to its location inside Taipei City's central business district, but the city suffers from the noise, pollution, restrictions on urban planning, and traffic congestion the airport brings about. In the 2002 and 2006 Taipei Mayor Election DPP candidates Lee Ying-yuan and Frank Hsieh both proposed the plan to close Songshan Airport, and developed its land into road, huge park, detention basin and sports arena, since the Taiwan High Speed Rail could quickly take up the traffic load between Taipei and western Taiwan cities, and the remaining service to outlying islands and eastern Taiwan could be easily taken over by the Taiwan Taoyuan International Airport after the completion of the Taoyuan International Airport Access MRT System by the end of 2016. Also, the MRT system will make the international potential of Songshan airport less attractive. The Songshan Airport closing proposal was deferred under the Taipei City Government which has long been dominated by the Pan-Blue Coalition, who prefers the downtown airport connection concept with Shanghai, Seoul, and Tokyo.

Due to the introduction of Taiwan-China flights and future international potential, the airport is undergoing extensive renovations, the first phase of which is expected to be completed by October 2010. The second and third phase renovations are expected to be completed by March and October 2011, respectively. However, as of November 2011 renovations are still in progress. A new international cargo terminal is being built in anticipation of a new air route between Taiwan and Japan. The unused Terminal 2 was refurbished to accommodate arriving flights while the main Terminal, now Terminal 1, was rearranged to handle increased passenger traffic. On 29 March 2011, the renovated Terminal 2 was re-opened to handle domestic flights.

== International potential ==
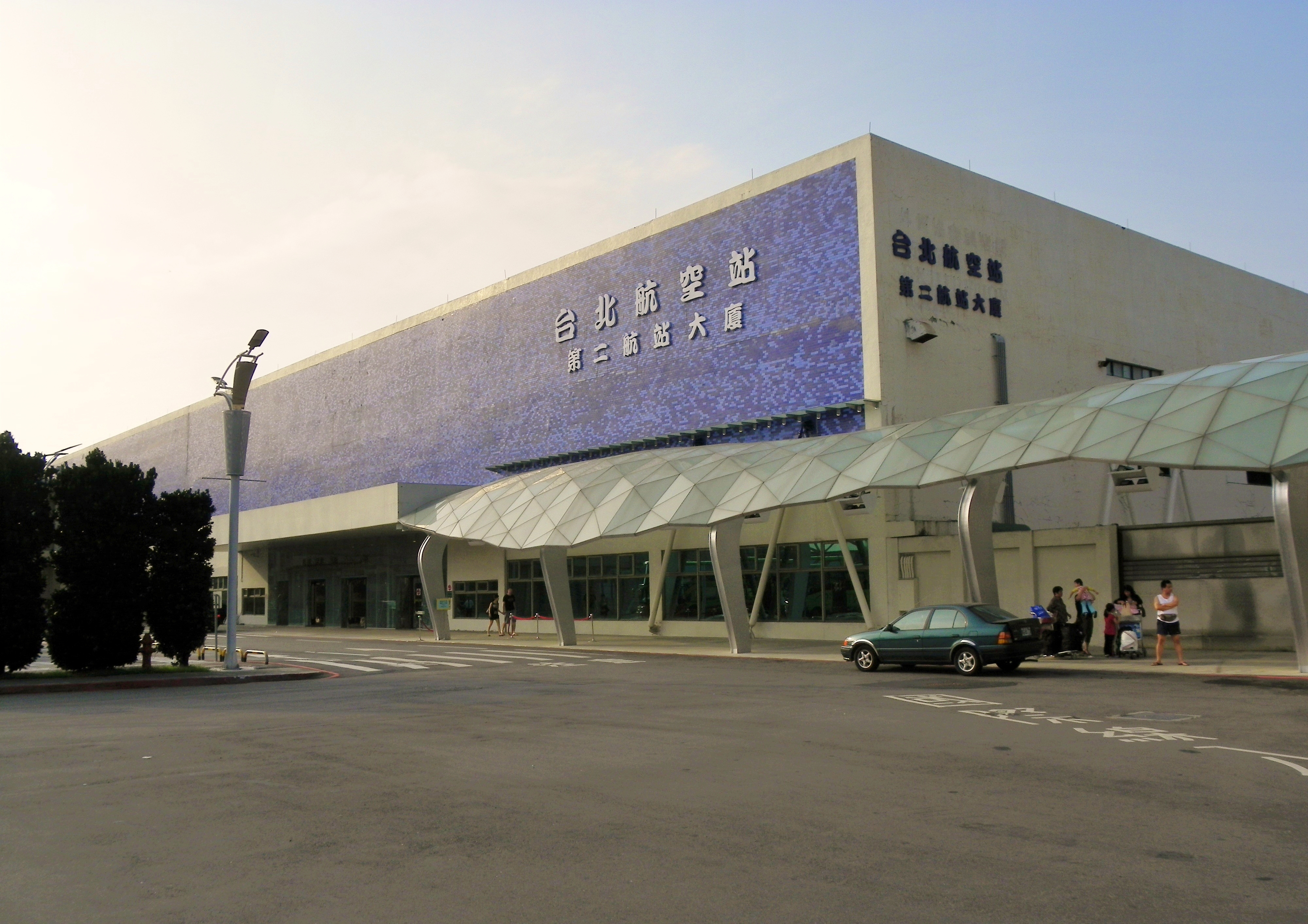
Taipei Songshan Airport Terminal 2

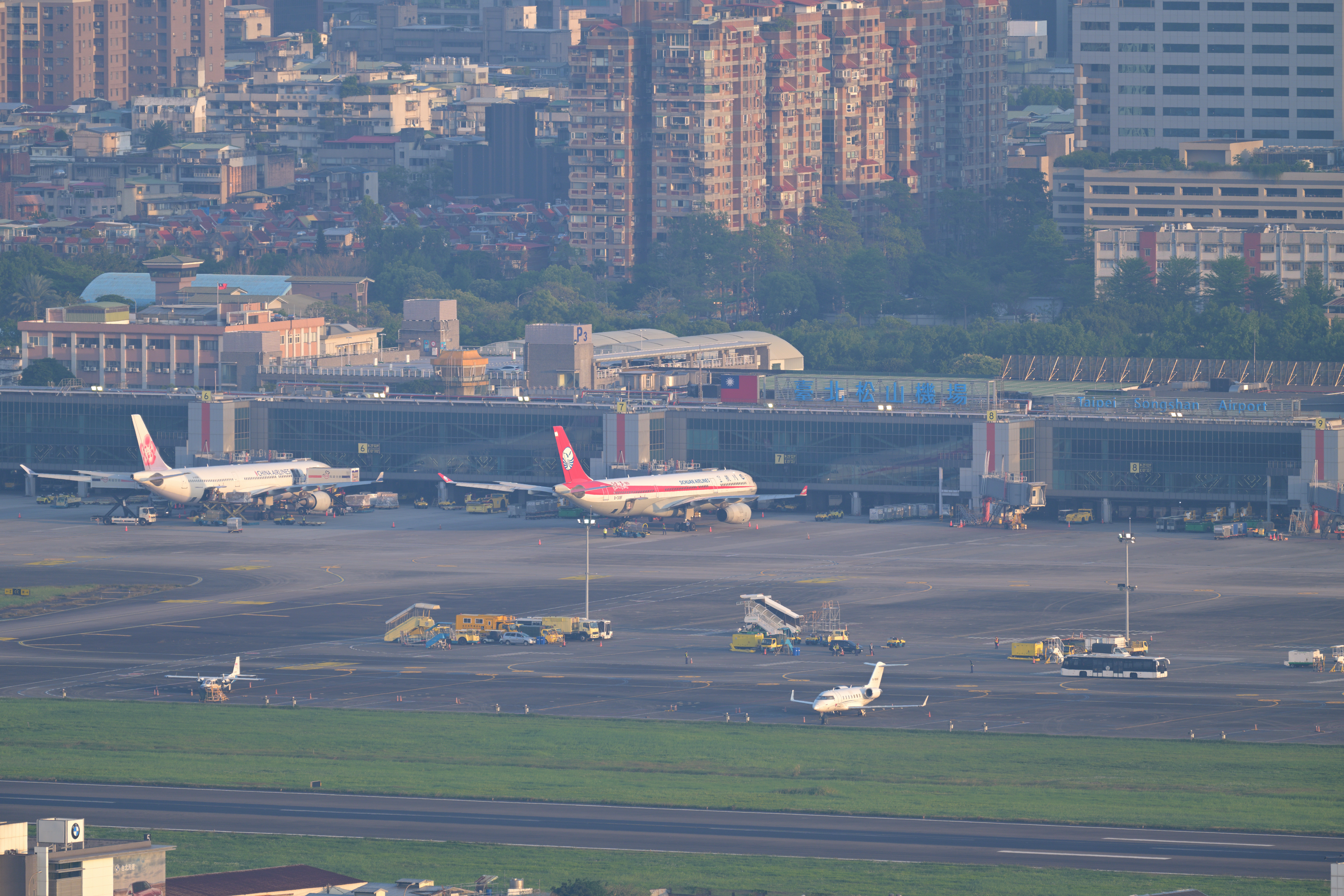
Aircraft parked at Songshan Airport

Similar to Buenos Aires–Aeroparque, London–City, Milan–Linate, and Toronto–Billy Bishop airports, Songshan Airport is seen to have the potential to attract business travellers within Pacific Asia due to its location in downtown Taipei. Flights to Bangkok–Don Mueang, Jakarta–Halim Perdanakusuma, Kuala Lumpur–Subang, Nagoya–Komaki, Osaka–Itami, Seoul–Gimpo, Shanghai–Hongqiao, and Tokyo–Haneda are especially attractive since these airports are also closer to the central areas or business districts of their respective cities, and all these cities have larger far flung international airports. The airport is currently in the process of expansion to better accommodate international flights.

On 6 March 2009, Japan and Taiwan signed a memorandum of understanding on the revision of Taiwan–Japan bilateral traffic. Four carriers (EVA Air, China Airlines, Japan Airlines, and All Nippon Airways) would be able to operate from Songshan Airport to Tokyo–Haneda. In December 2009, an affirmative schedule for the route between Tokyo–Haneda and Taipei–Songshan was announced. Starting in October 2010, EVA Air, China Airlines, Japan Airlines, and All Nippon Airways each operates two flights a day from Taipei–Songshan to Tokyo–Haneda, with China Airlines and EVA Air both utilizing the Airbus A330-300, but EVA Air have phased in the newer Boeing 787-10 on the route beginning in 2023. All Nippon Airways and Japan Airlines began this route with the Boeing 767-300ER, but have phased in the newer Boeing 787-8 on the route beginning in 2013 and 2014, respectively. Japan Airlines also previously used the Boeing 777-200ER on this route.

On 14 June 2010, direct flights between Taipei–Songshan and Shanghai–Hongqiao began. Each week has 28 flights, served by China Eastern Airlines, Shanghai Airlines, Air China, China Airlines, EVA Air, and TransAsia Airways. The airport will undergo upgrades to its runway and reduce its jet bridges from eight to six to accommodate wider contemporary aircraft such as the Airbus A330 and Boeing 767.

== Airlines and destinations ==
The following airlines operate regular passenger flights at Songshan:

Airlines	Destinations
Air China	Chongqing, Shanghai–Hongqiao
All Nippon Airways	Tokyo–Haneda
China Airlines	Seoul–Gimpo, Shanghai–Hongqiao, Tokyo–Haneda
China Eastern Airlines	Shanghai–Hongqiao
Eastar Jet	Seoul–Gimpo
EVA Air	Seoul–Gimpo, Shanghai–Hongqiao, Tokyo–Haneda
Japan Airlines	Tokyo–Haneda
Mandarin Airlines	Fuzhou, Kinmen, Matsu–Nangan, Penghu, Taitung, Wuhan
Shanghai Airlines	Shanghai–Hongqiao, Shanghai–Pudong
Sichuan Airlines	Chengdu–Tianfu, Chongqing
Trinity Airways	Seoul–Gimpo
Uni Air	Hualien, Kinmen, Matsu–Beigan, Matsu–Nangan, Penghu, Shanghai–Pudong, Taitung, Xiamen
XiamenAir	Fuzhou, Xiamen

== Statistics ==
In 2018, Songshan Airport handled 6,225,932 passengers and 47,132.9 tons of cargo. The route between Taipei Songshan and Kinmen is the busiest domestic route in Taiwan, with 1,267,630 travelers in 2018. In 2018, the ten routes with the largest number of passengers are as follows:

Busiest routes from Taipei–Songshan (2018)
Rank	Airport	Passengers 2018	Carriers
1	Tokyo–Haneda	1,418,248	China Airlines, EVA Air, All Nippon Airways, Japan Airlines
2	Kinmen	1,267,630	Mandarin Airlines, UNI Air
3	Penghu	1,036,535	Mandarin Airlines, UNI Air
4	Shanghai–Hongqiao	727,278	China Airlines, EVA Air, Air China, China Eastern, Shanghai Airlines
5	Matsu Nangan	252,172	UNI Air
6	Taitung	249,056	Mandarin Airlines, UNI Air
7	Seoul–Gimpo	242,363	China Airlines, EVA Air, Eastar Jet, T'way Air
8	Shanghai–Pudong	205,552	UNI Air, Shanghai Airlines
9	Fuzhou	162,734	Mandarin Airlines, XiamenAir
10	Xiamen	147,771	UNI Air, XiamenAir

== Ground transportation ==
=== Metro ===
The airport is served by the Songshan Airport metro station on the Wenhu line of the Taipei Metro. The TR Songshan Airport Line also formerly served Songshan Airport from 1936 until 1976.

=== Bus ===
Several city buses also serve this airport, providing frequent links to the Tamsui Line and Wenshan Line of the Taipei Metro.

== Accidents and incidents ==
- On 23 October 1944, a Japanese passenger transport plane crashed into the Taiwan Grand Shrine on Jiantan Mountain shortly after take-off from then Matsuyama Airfield. Many parts of the shrine, including the Torii ceremonial archway and stone toro lanterns, were damaged in the crash.
- On 20 February 1970, Douglas DC-3 B-243 of Far Eastern Air Transport crashed into a mountain shortly after take-off. The aircraft was operating a cargo flight; both crew were killed.
- On 12 August 1970, China Airlines Flight 206 crashed at the airport in a CFIT accident.
- On 7 October 1974, a Vickers Viscount of Far Eastern Air Transport was the subject of an attempted hijacking. The hijacker was overpowered and the aircraft landed at its intended destination of Taipei Songshan Airport.
- On 1 February 1975, Vickers Viscount PK-RVM of Mandala Airlines was damaged beyond economic repair when it overran the runway.
- On 31 July 1975, Vickers Viscount B-2029 of Far Eastern Air Transport crashed, killing 27 of the 75 people on board.
- On 22 August 1981, Boeing 737-200 of Far Eastern Air Transport broke up after takeoff from Songshan, killing everyone on board.
- On 10 October 1997, a Republic of China Air Force C-130 Hercules 1310, c/n 5067, delivered October 1986, crashed during an attempted go-around, killing all five on board.
- On 4 February 2015, TransAsia Airways Flight 235, an ATR 72-600 (B-22816), crashed shortly after takeoff from Taipei Songshan Airport, first clipping a taxi and then crashing into Keelung River near Taipei. Of the 53 passengers and five crew members, 43 were killed.

== See also ==
- Taoyuan International Airport
- Civil Aeronautics Administration (Taiwan)
- Transportation in Taiwan
- List of airports in Taiwan
