= Mandarin Airlines =

Regional airline of Taiwan

Mandarin Airlines 華信航空

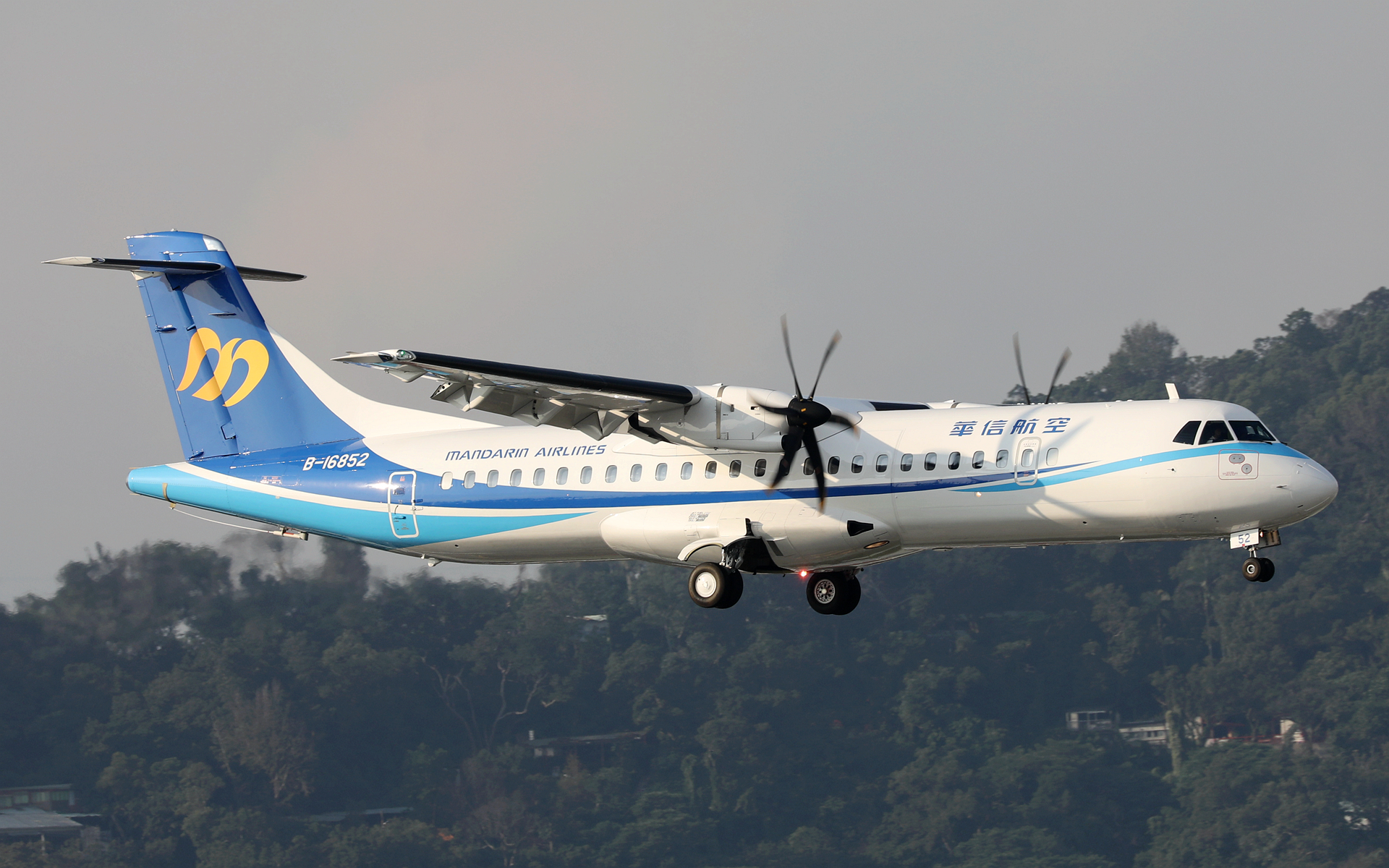
- Mandarin Airlines ATR 72-600
IATA	ICAO	Call sign
AE	MDA	MANDARIN
- Founded: 1 June 1991; 35 years ago
- Commenced operations: 16 October 1991; 35 years ago
- Hubs: Taipei–Songshan
- Focus cities: Kaohsiung; Taichung
- Frequent-flyer program: Dynasty Flyer
- Alliance: SkyTeam (affiliate)
- Fleet size: 13
- Destinations: 34
- Parent company: China Airlines Group
- Headquarters: Songshan, Taipei, Taiwan
- Key people: Kao Shing Hwang (Chairman)
- Website: www.mandarin-airlines.com

Mandarin Airlines (traditional Chinese: 華信航空; simplified Chinese: 华信航空; pinyin: Huáxìn Hángkōng) is a Taiwanese regional airline based in Taipei, Taiwan whose parent company is China Airlines. The airline operates domestic and regional international flights, while its parent company focuses on international operations. Some charter services are also operated by the company. Its main bases are Songshan Airport, Taichung International Airport and Kaohsiung International Airport.

== History ==
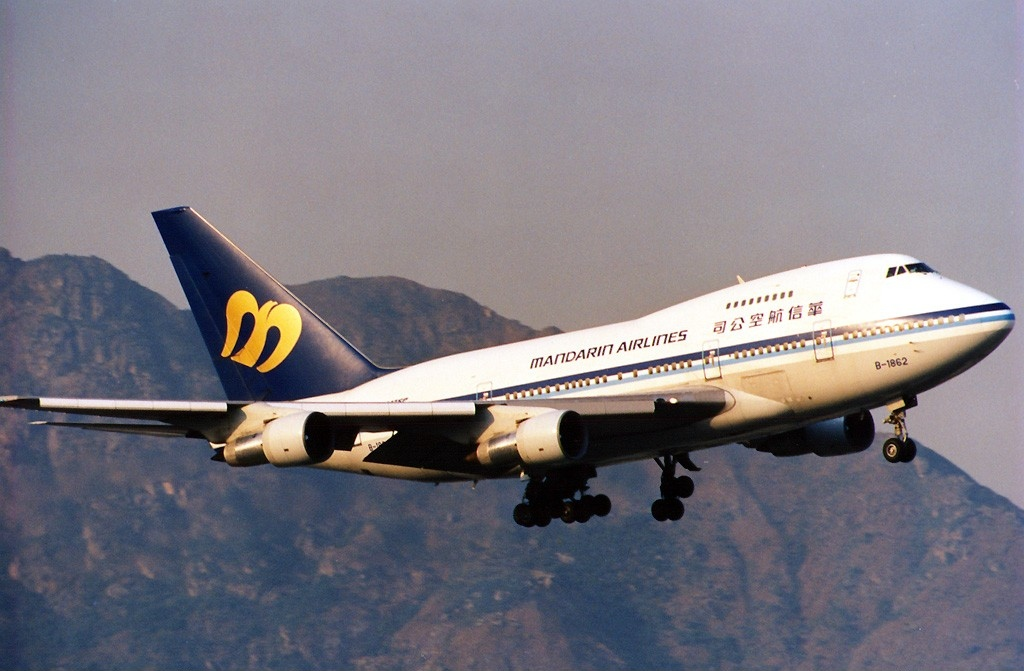
A Boeing 747SP landing at Kai Tak Airport in Hong Kong in 1996. The 747-SP was one of the first aircraft in the fleet and was acquired from China Airlines.

Mandarin Airlines was established on 1 June 1991, and was initially a joint venture by China Airlines (67%) and Koos Group (33%); the Chinese name of the company is formed by the combination of the two. The establishment of Mandarin Airlines is closely related to the political status of Taiwan. At the time, Mandarin Airlines' parent company, China Airlines, still served as the flag carrier of the Republic of China, with the flag of the Republic of China a part of its livery. Denying the existence of the Taipei government, the People's Republic of China hence attempted to boycott the international presence of China Airlines, using trade barriers to achieve its political goal. However, PRC's objection did not extend to other Taiwanese carriers not carrying the ROC flag. As a way to work around these limits, Mandarin Airlines was founded while China Airlines maintained its role as the flag carrier.

On 16 October 1991, Mandarin Airlines started operations with direct flights from Taipei to Sydney in Australia. The next step was the opening of a direct air route to Vancouver in Canada on 7 December 1991. Thus, Mandarin Airlines became Taiwan's first airline to fly directly to Australia and Canada. The China Trust Group pulled its investment in Mandarin Airlines on 31 October 1992, turning the airline into a company virtually wholly owned by China Airlines (90.05%) by December 1992. Also, Mandarin Airlines' role was changed to that of a primary domestic and short-range intra-regional airline, after parent China Airlines was able to re-establish its emphasis on international routes, due to a new livery that did not include the national flag, and thus faced less objection from the PRC.

On 8 August 1999, China Airlines formally merged its subsidiary, Mandarin Airlines, with Formosa Airlines under the Mandarin name. Mandarin took over Formosa's domestic operations and aircraft while Mandarin's fleet and most of its international flights were transferred to China Airlines. In early 2000, the airline bought 5 Dornier 228 aircraft from Uni Air to fly outlying routes. These planes were sold to Daily Air in 2005, a helicopter carrier in Taiwan which had won the bid to fly these money-losing routes.

Mandarin Airlines is owned by China Airlines (93.99%) and has 630 employees (as of March 2007).

== Corporate affairs ==
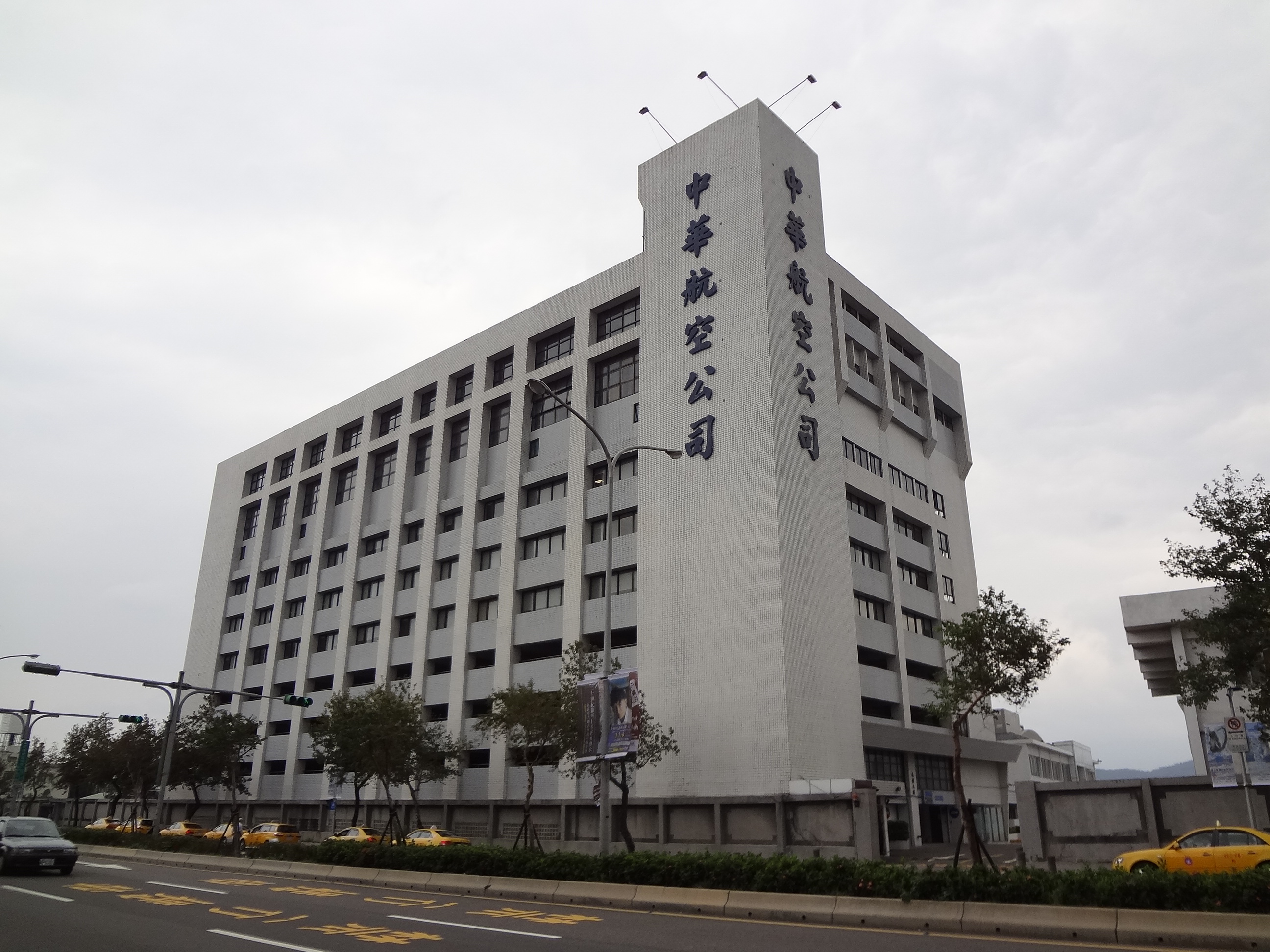
China Airlines Minquan Building, which houses the headquarters of Mandarin Airlines

=== Headquarters ===
The headquarters is currently in Songshan District, Taipei. Previously the headquarters was in a different building in Taipei.

=== Corporate design ===
The airline uses Hai Tung Ching (海東青; 海东青; Hǎidōngqīng), a gyrfalcon from a Chinese legend, as its logo.

== Destinations ==
As of June 2024, Mandarin Airlines flies (or has flown) to the following destinations; destinations in China may include scheduled charter service or indirect routing which transit through other countries:

Country	City	Airport	Notes	Refs
Australia	Brisbane	Brisbane Airport	Terminated	
Australia	Sydney	Sydney Airport	Terminated	
Canada	Vancouver	Vancouver International Airport	Terminated	
China	Changchun	Changchun Longjia International Airport	Terminated	
China	Changsha	Changsha Huanghua International Airport	Terminated	
China	Fuzhou	Fuzhou Changle International Airport		
China	Hangzhou	Hangzhou Xiaoshan International Airport	Terminated	
China	Jieyang	Jieyang Chaoshan International Airport	Terminated	
China	Lijiang	Lijiang Sanyi International Airport	Terminated	
China	Nanjing	Nanjing Lukou International Airport	Terminated	
China	Ningbo	Ningbo Lishe International Airport	Terminated	
China	Shenyang	Shenyang Taoxian International Airport		
China	Wenzhou	Wenzhou Longwan International Airport		
China	Wuhan	Wuhan Tianhe International Airport		
China	Wuxi	Sunan Shuofang International Airport	Terminated	
China	Xiamen	Xiamen Gaoqi International Airport		
China	Yancheng	Yancheng Nanyang International Airport	Terminated	
China	Zhengzhou	Zhengzhou Xinzheng International Airport	Terminated	
Germany	Frankfurt	Frankfurt Airport	Terminated	
Hong Kong	Hong Kong	Hong Kong International Airport	Terminated	
Hong Kong	Hong Kong	Kai Tak Airport	Airport closed	
Japan	Ishigaki	New Ishigaki Airport	Terminated	
Japan	Ōita	Oita Airport ^{Charter}	Terminated	
Japan	Osaka	Kansai International Airport	Terminated	
Japan	Tokyo	Narita International Airport	Terminated	
Macau	Macau	Macau International Airport	Terminated	
Netherlands	Amsterdam	Amsterdam Airport Schiphol	Terminated	
Philippines	Cebu	Mactan–Cebu International Airport	Terminated	
Philippines	Kalibo	Kalibo International Airport	Terminated	
Philippines	Laoag	Laoag International Airport	Terminated	
South Korea	Seoul	Incheon International Airport	Terminated	
Taiwan	Hualien	Hualien Airport		
Taiwan	Kaohsiung	Kaohsiung International Airport	Focus city	
Taiwan	Kinmen	Kinmen Airport		
Taiwan	Nangan	Nangan Airport		
Taiwan	Penghu	Penghu Airport		
Taiwan	Taichung	Taichung International Airport	Focus city	
Taiwan	Taipei	Songshan Airport	Hub	
Taiwan	Taipei	Taoyuan International Airport		
Taiwan	Taitung	Taitung Airport		
Thailand	Bangkok	Don Mueang International Airport	Terminated	
Vietnam	Hanoi	Noi Bai International Airport	Terminated	
Vietnam	Ho Chi Minh City	Tan Son Nhat International Airport		

=== Interline agreements ===
Mandarin Airlines has interline agreements with the following airlines:

- Emirates
- Singapore Airlines

=== Codeshare agreements ===
Mandarin Airlines has codeshare agreements with the following airlines:

- China Airlines
- China Eastern Airlines
- China Southern Airlines
- XiamenAir

== Fleet ==
=== Current fleet ===
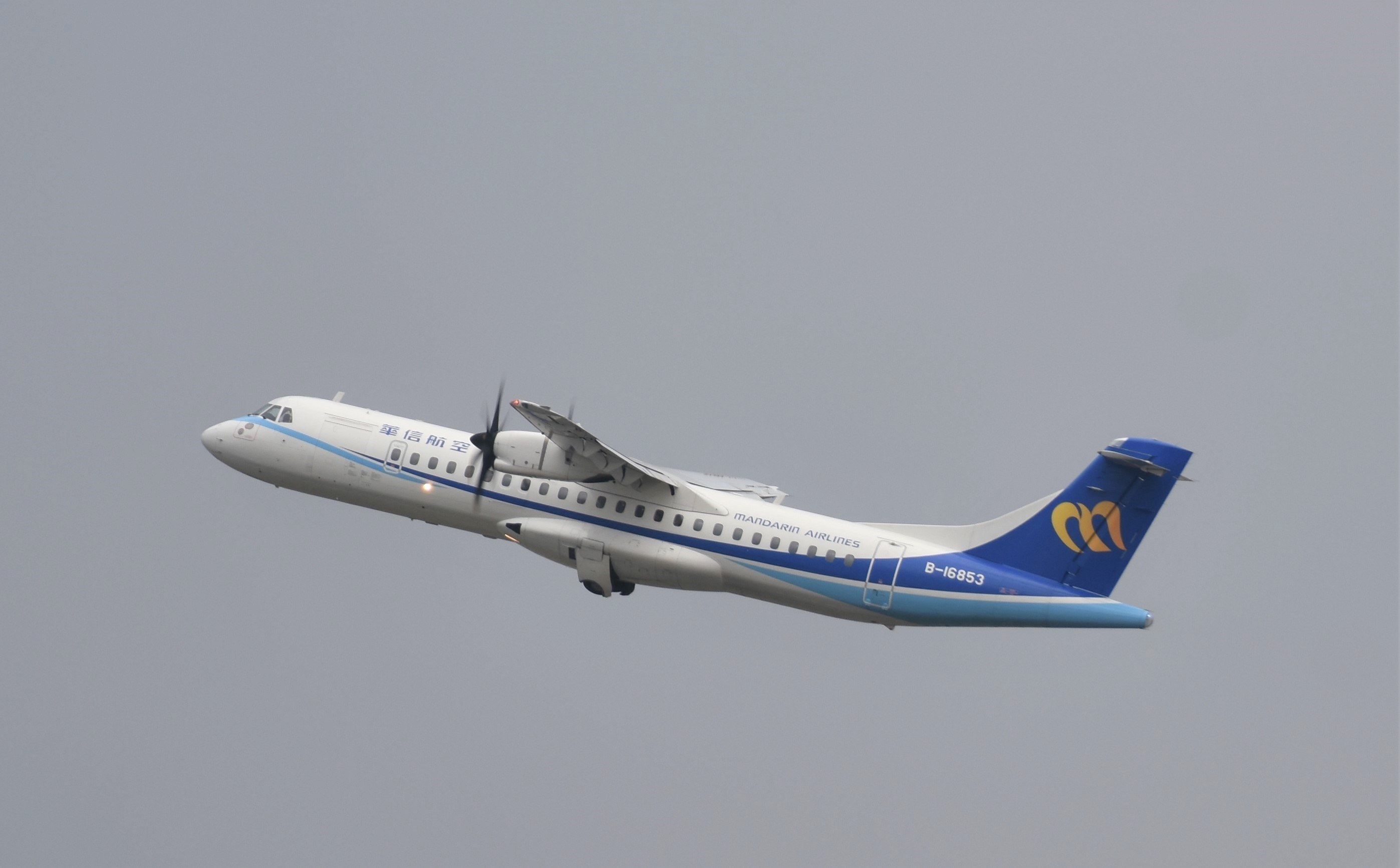
Mandarin Airlines ATR 72-600

As of November 2025, Mandarin Airlines operates the following aircraft:

Mandarin Airlines fleet
Aircraft	In service	Orders	Passengers			Notes
Aircraft	In service	Orders	C	Y	Total	Notes
ATR 72-600	10	3	–	70	70	Deliveries until 2025.
Boeing 737-800	1	–	8	150	158	
Airbus A321-271NX	–	2	(TBA)			To be delivered in 2027.
Total	13	5				

=== Fleet development ===
Mandarin Airlines announced the lease of eight Embraer E190 aircraft from GE Commercial Aviation Services in December 2005 to replace the aging Fokker 50 and Fokker 100s in its fleet. Mandarin Airlines' E190's featured a refreshed livery, with the first aircraft delivered in May 2007, becoming the first, and to date the only, Taiwanese airline to use this type of aircraft. On 27 October 2009, Mandarin Airlines retired its last Fokker 100 aircraft, ending this type's 14-year service with the airline. On 19 July 2017, Mandarin Airlines placed orders for six ATR 72-600 aircraft to be delivered in 2018.

=== Former fleet ===
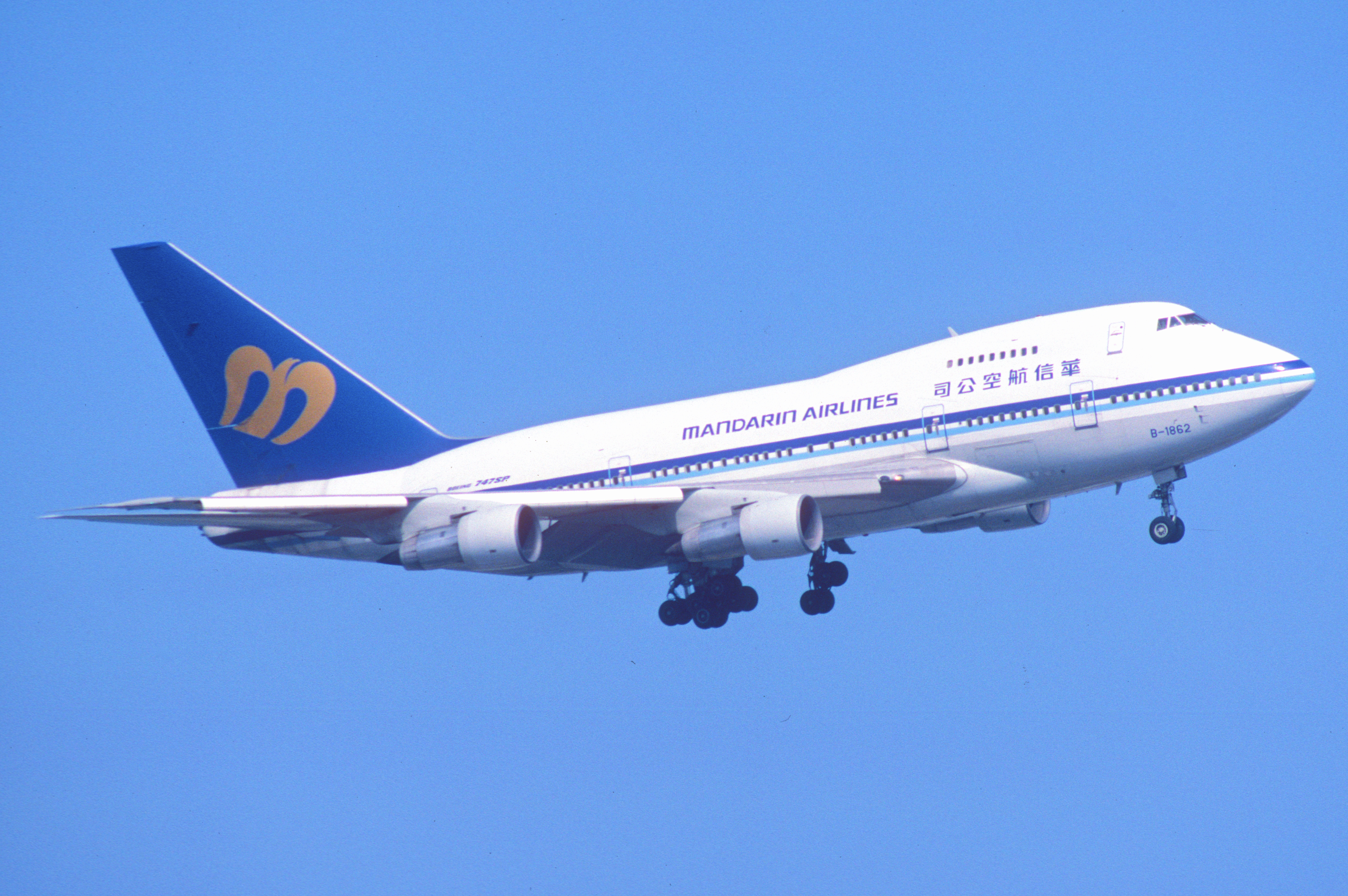
A former Mandarin Airlines Boeing 747SP in 1996

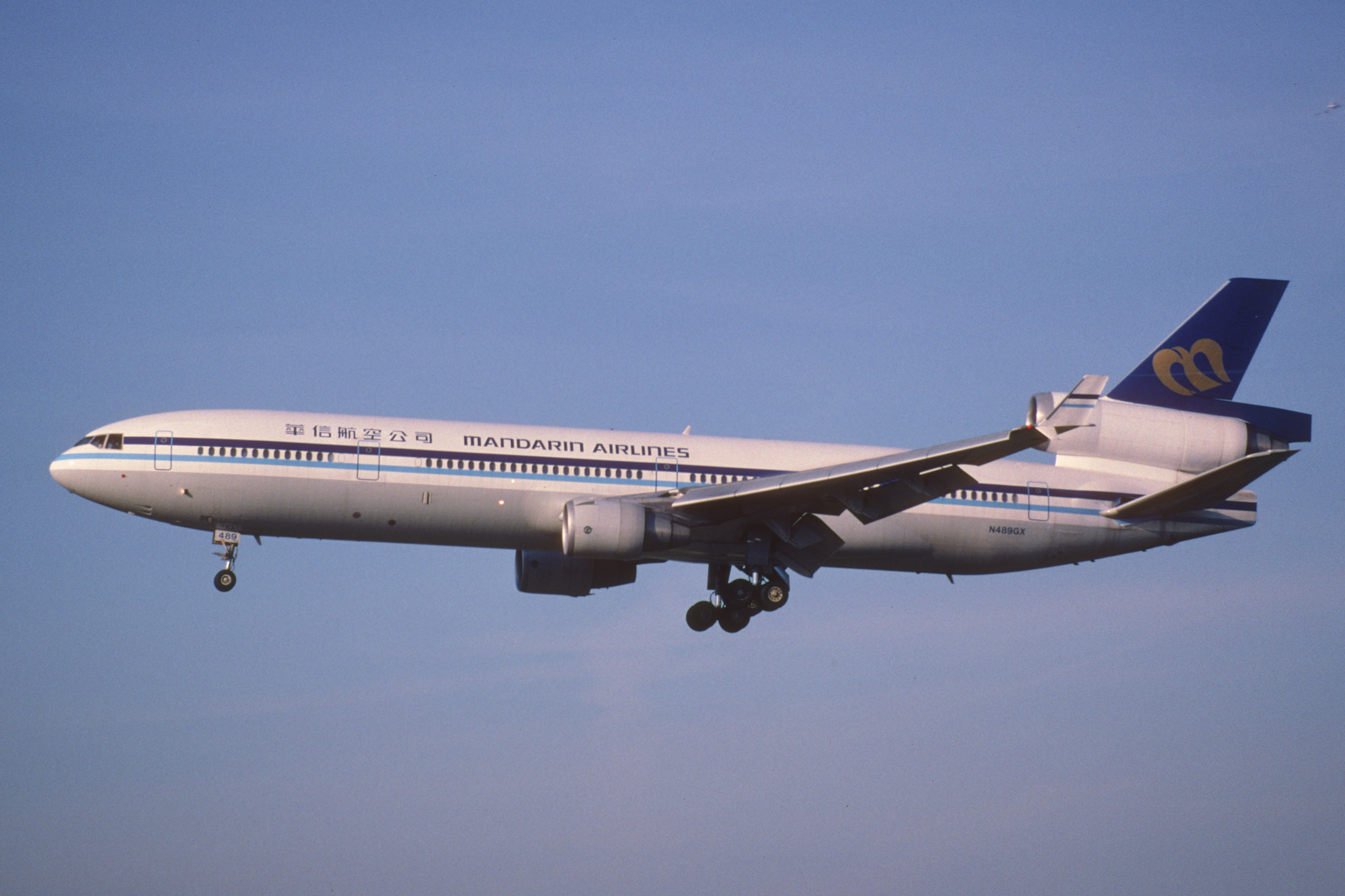
A former Mandarin Airlines McDonnell Douglas MD-11 in 1998

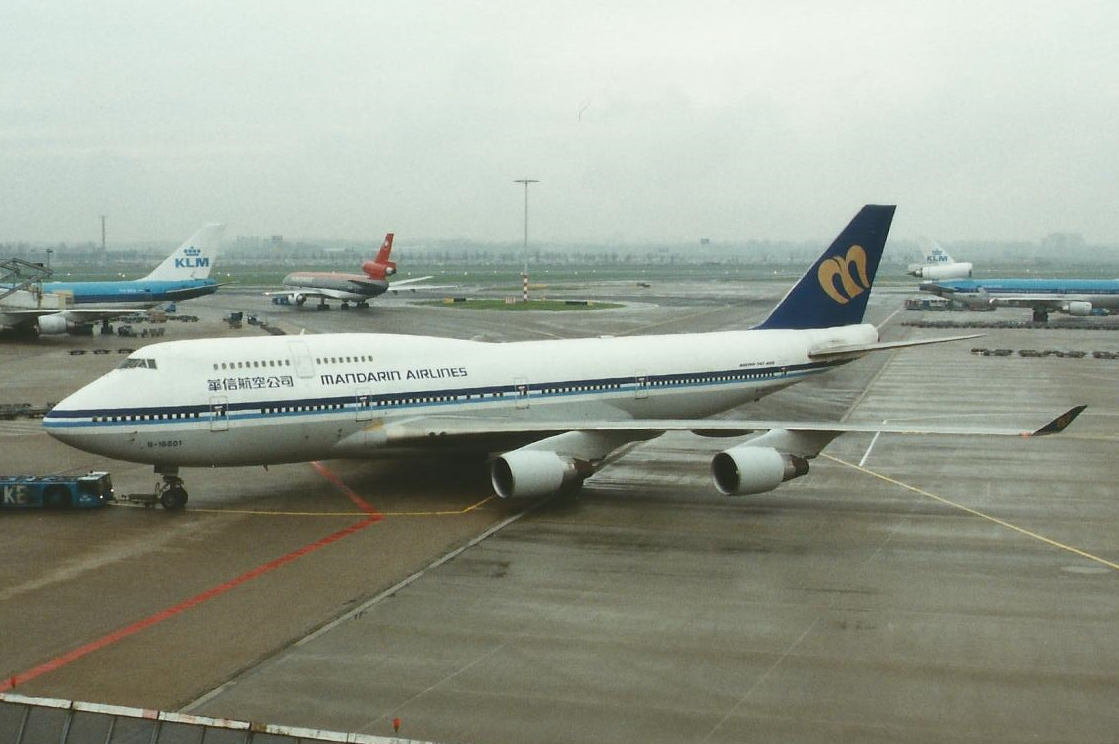
A former Mandarin Airlines Boeing 747-400 in 2000

In the past, Mandarin Airlines has previously operated the following aircraft:

Mandarin Airlines former fleet
Aircraft	Total	Introduced	Retired	Notes
Airbus A340-300	1	2006	2007	
Boeing 737-800	6	2000	2019	Returned to China Airlines
Boeing 747-400	1	1995	2000	Transferred to China Airlines
Boeing 747SP	4	1991	2004	
Dornier 228	4	2000	2005	
Embraer E190	8	2007	2021	
Fokker 50	7	1999	2008	
Fokker 100	6	1999	2009	
McDonnell Douglas MD-11	5	1993	2002	
Saab 340	1	1999	2000	Transferred to Golden Air

== Accidents and incidents ==
As 2024, Mandarin Airlines was involved in two incidents with no hull loss and fatalities. One McDonnell Douglas MD-11 which wore Mandarin Airlines' livery crashed while landing at Hong Kong International Airport on August 22, 1999, resulting in three fatalities, but it was withdrawn from Mandarin Airlines three months before the crash and operated by China Airlines upon the crash.

- On December 6, 2006, Mandarin Airlines Flight 1261 flew from Taipei to Kinmen. After a normal landing at Kinmen Airport, it was found that a wheel of the front landing gear had fallen off. Later, the wheel was found next to the runway of Songshan Airport. There were no casualties.
- On 17 August 2012, Mandarin Airlines Flight 369 experienced a runway excursion during heavy rain due to improper landing and deceleration technique on runway 20 at Magong Airport. The E-190 aircraft was intentionally steered off the side of the runway and struck the base of four concrete runway lights, causing the nose gear to collapse. No injuries were reported.

== See also ==
- List of airlines of Taiwan
- Air transport in Taiwan
- List of airports in Taiwan
- List of companies of Taiwan
- Transportation in Taiwan
- China Airlines
