= Civil Aviation Administration (Taiwan) =

Government agency of the Republic of China, Taiwan

- 民用航空局; Mínyòng Hángkōng Jú (Mandarin); Bîn-iōng Hâng-khong-kio̍k (Taiwanese); Mìn-yung Hòng-khung-khiu̍k (Hakka)

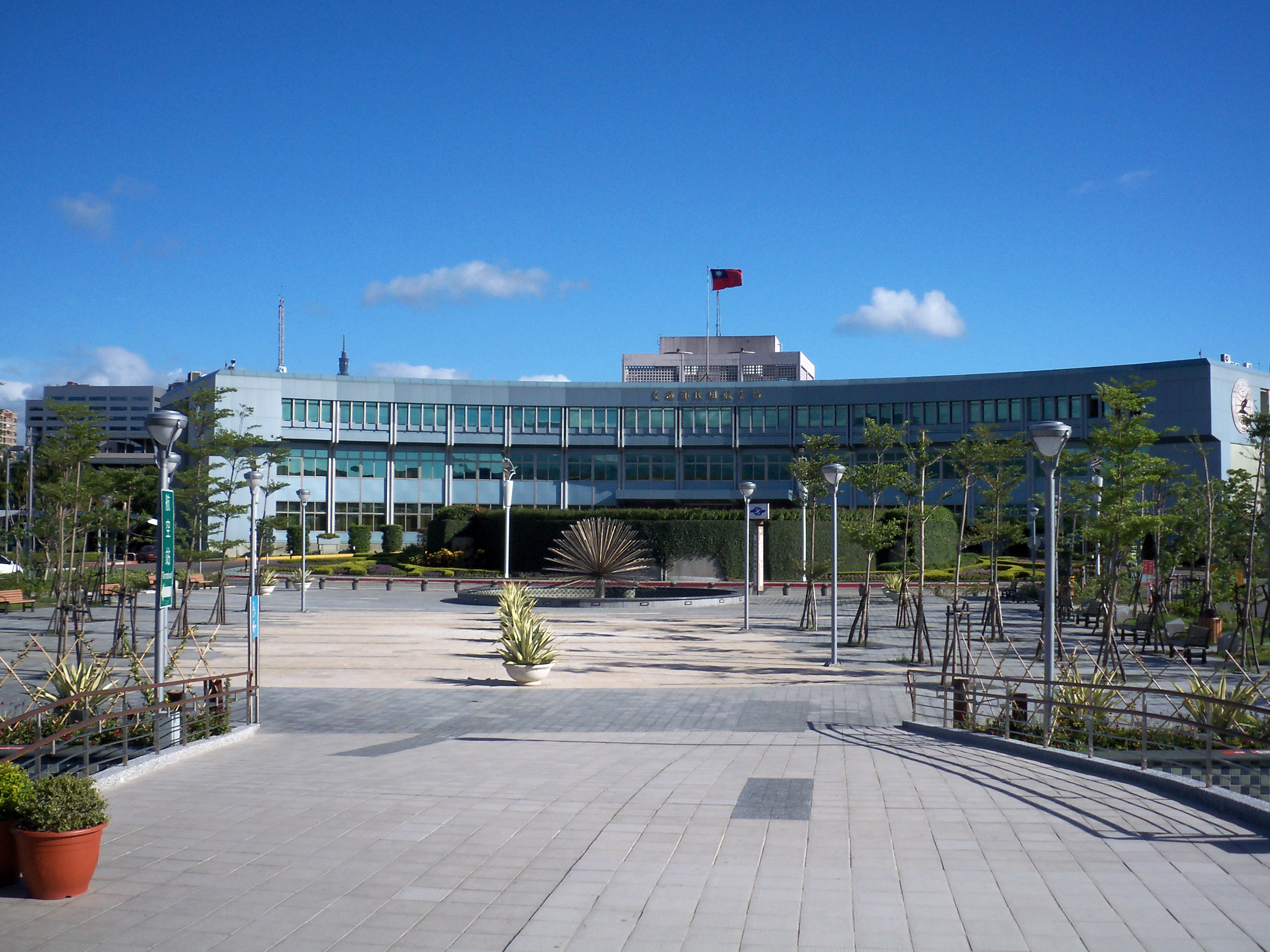

Agency overview
- Formed: 20 January 1947
- Jurisdiction: Republic of China (Taiwan)
- Headquarters: Songshan, Taipei
- Agency executives: Lin Chih-ming (林志明), Director-General; Lee Wan-li (李萬里), Fang Chih-wen (方志文), Deputy Director-Generals
- Parent agency: Ministry of Transportation and Communication
- Website: www.caa.gov.tw

The Civil Aviation Administration (CAA; Chinese: 民用航空局; pinyin: Mínyòng Hángkōng Jú; Pe̍h-ōe-jī: Bîn-iōng Hâng-khong-kio̍k) is the government agency of the Ministry of Transportation and Communications of the Republic of China (Taiwan) that is responsible for the regulation of all civil aviation activities. CAA operates the passenger terminals in 18 airports, of which 9 airports are owned by CAA, with the rest owned by the Republic of China Air Force.

== History ==
The agency was established on January 20, 1947. Due to organization reform the Civil Aeronautics Administration was renamed to Civil Aviation Administration on September 15, 2023 following promulgation by the President on June 7, 2023.

== Organizational structure ==
- Logistic Division
- Aerodrome Engineering Division
- Air Navigation Facilities Division
- Air Traffic Services Division
- Flight Standards Division
- Air Traffic Division
- Planning, Legal and International Affair Division
- Civil Service Ethics Office
- Budget, Accounting and Statistics Office
- Personnel Office
- Secretariat
- Information Management Office

== Airports operated by CAA ==
=== International ===
- Taiwan Taoyuan International Airport (IATA: TPE, ICAO: RCTP)
- Kaohsiung International Airport (IATA: KHH, ICAO: RCKH)
- Taichung International Airport (IATA: RMQ, ICAO: RCMQ)
- Taipei Songshan Airport (IATA: TSA, ICAO: RCSS)

=== Domestic ===
- Chiayi Airport (IATA: CYI, ICAO: RCKU)
- Cimei Airport (IATA: CMJ, ICAO: RCCM)
- Hengchun Airport (IATA: HCN, ICAO: RCKW)
- Hualien Airport (IATA: HUN, ICAO: RCYU)
- Kinmen Airport (IATA: KNH, ICAO: RCBS)
- Lanyu Airport (IATA: KYD, ICAO: RCLY)
- Lyudao Airport (IATA: GNI, ICAO: RCGI)
- Makung Airport (IATA: MZG, ICAO: RCQC)
- Matsu Beigan Airport (IATA: MFK, ICAO: RCMT)
- Matsu Nangan Airport (IATA: LZN, ICAO: RCFG)
- Tainan Airport (IATA: TNN, ICAO: RCNN)
- Taitung Airport (IATA: TTT, ICAO: RCFN)
- Wang-an Airport (IATA: WOT, ICAO: RCWA)

== Other Subsidiaries ==
- Air Navigation and Weather Services
- Aviation Training Institute

== Directors-General ==
- 16 July 2012 - 16 January 2015: Jean Shen (沈啓)
- 16 January 2015 – present: Lin Chih-ming (林志明)

== Transportation ==
The CAA building is located on the grounds of Songshan Airport, accessible within walking distance south of Songshan Airport MRT station of the Taipei Metro.

== See also ==
- Ministry of Transportation and Communications (Taiwan)
- Transport in Taiwan
- List of airports in Taiwan
