= Lüdao Airport =

Green Island Airport 綠島航空站
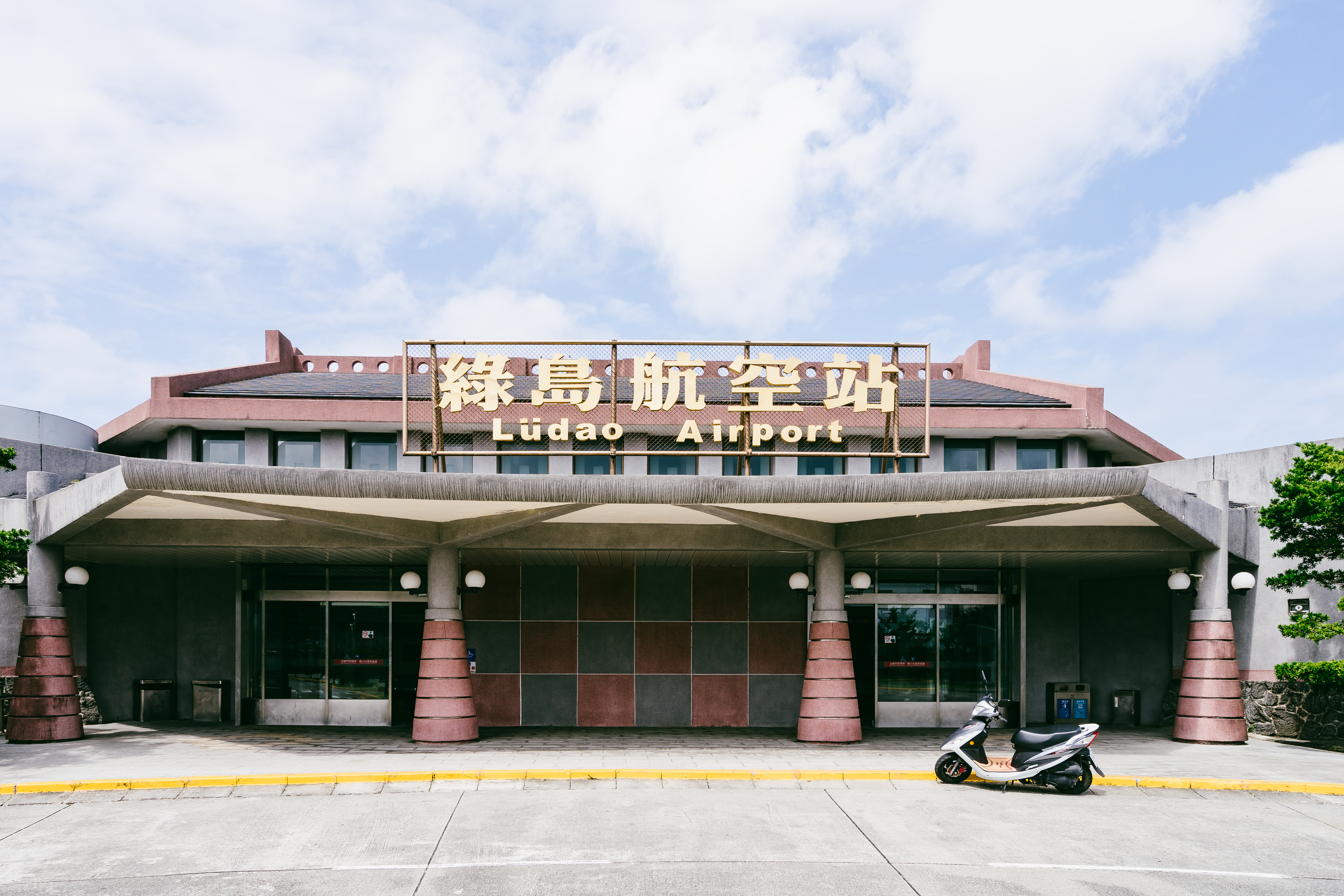
- IATA: GNI; ICAO: RCGI

Summary
- Airport type: Public
- Operator: Civil Aeronautics Administration
- Serves: Green Island, Taiwan
- Elevation AMSL: 28 ft (8.5 m)
- Coordinates: 22°40′25″N 121°27′59″E

Map
- Location of airport in Taiwan

Runways
Direction	Length		Surface
Direction	m	ft	Surface
17/35	992	3,255	Asphalt

Green Island Airport (Chinese: 綠島航空站; pinyin: Lǜdǎo Hángkōngzhàn) (IATA: GNI, ICAO: RCGI) is an airport serving Lüdao, in Taitung County, Taiwan (ROC).

== History ==
The airport was built in 1972, and was under the control of the Taiwan Garrison Command. It was rebuilt in 1977, and is now under control of the Civil Aeronautics Administration. An airport expansion project was implemented in 1995.

== Facilities ==
The airport is 28 feet (9 m) above mean sea level. It has one runway designated 17/35 with an asphalt surface measuring 992 by 23 metres (3,255 ft × 75 ft).

== Airlines and destinations ==
As of 2025, it only operates daily flights to Taitung.

Airlines	Destinations
Daily Air	Taitung

== See also ==
- Civil Aeronautics Administration (Taiwan)
- Transportation in Taiwan
- List of airports in Taiwan
