= Daily Air =

Regional airline of Taiwan

Daily Air 德安航空
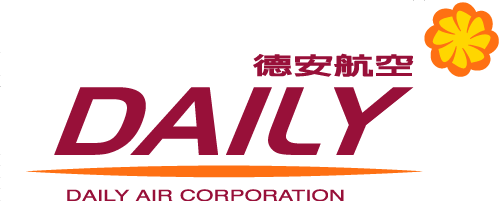
IATA	ICAO	Call sign
DA	DAC	DAILY
- Founded: 1993; 33 years ago
- Hubs: Kaohsiung International Airport
- Focus cities: Taitung Airport
- Fleet size: 6
- Headquarters: 2F, 340-9 Tun-hua North Road, Songshan, Taipei City, Taiwan
- Website: www.dailyair.com.tw

Daily Air
- Chinese: 德安航空
Transcriptions
Standard Mandarin
- Hanyu Pinyin: Dé'ān Hángkōng

Former name
- Traditional Chinese: 達信航空
- Simplified Chinese: 达信航空
Transcriptions
Standard Mandarin
- Hanyu Pinyin: Dáxìn Hángkōng

Daily Air Corporation (Chinese: 德安航空; pinyin: Déān Hángkōng) is a Taiwanese regional airline with its headquarters in Songshan District, Taipei, Taiwan. It operates scheduled passenger services, primarily to domestic destinations such as offshore islands from Taiwan, including Penghu, Green Island and Orchid Island, as well as helicopter contract services and charters. Its main base is Taipei Songshan Airport, with hubs at Kaohsiung International Airport and Taitung Airport.

== History ==
The airline was established in 1992 as a helicopter operator. Aircraft services began on 8 June 2005. The airline is owned by Sincere and Durban Shopping Mall, Miramar Entertainment Park, DC Development (Construction) Group, Mayer Steel Pipe, Tze Shin Transportation and Terminal and Far Eastern Air Transport (5%). It had 100 employees, as of March 2007.

== Destinations ==
Hub
Focus city
Future destinations
Terminated destinations

Destination	Code	Airport	Notes	Refs
Kaohsiung	KHH	RCKH	Kaohsiung International Airport	
Green Island	GNI	RCGI	Lüdao Airport	
Magong	MZG	RCQC	Penghu Airport	
Orchid Island	KYD	RCLY	Lanyu Airport	
Cimei	CMJ	RCCM	Qimei Airport	
Taitung	TTT	RCFN	Taitung Airport	
Wangan	WOT	RCWA	Wang-an Airport	

== Fleet ==
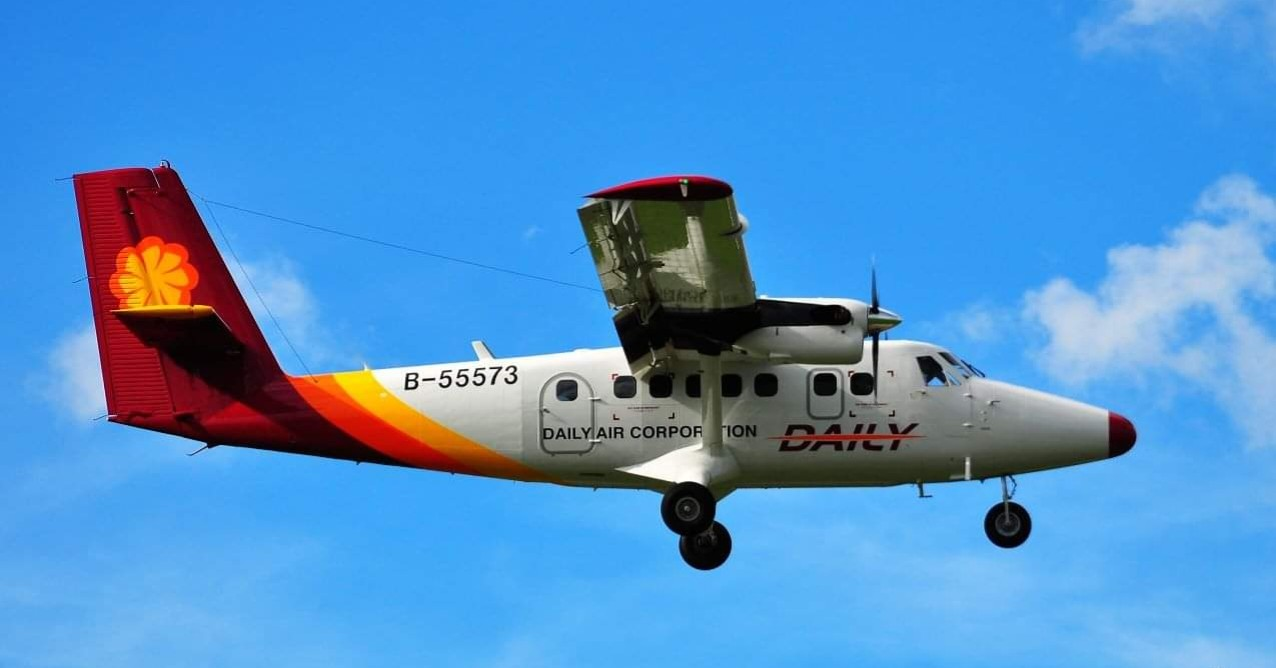
Daily Air DHC-6 Twin Otter

As of November 2016, the Daily Air fleet consists of the following aircraft:

Daily Air fleet
Aircraft	In service	Orders	Passengers	Notes
de Havilland Canada DHC-6 Twin Otter	4	—	19	(as of August 2025)
MBB/Kawasaki BK 117	2	—	8	
Total	6	—		

== Incidents and accidents ==
- On 13 April 2017, Flight 55571, a DHC-6, overran the runway and crashed into a guard rail in Lanyu Airport in Taitung County. None of the people on board were hurt.
- On 7 June 2017, a Daily Air-operated DHC-6-400 experienced malfunction in its front landing gear. No person on board was hurt.

== See also ==
- List of companies of Taiwan
- List of airlines of Taiwan
- Air transport in Taiwan
- List of airports in Taiwan
- Transportation in Taiwan
