= Kaohsiung International Airport =

Airport in southern Taiwan

Kaohsiung International Airport 高雄國際航空站
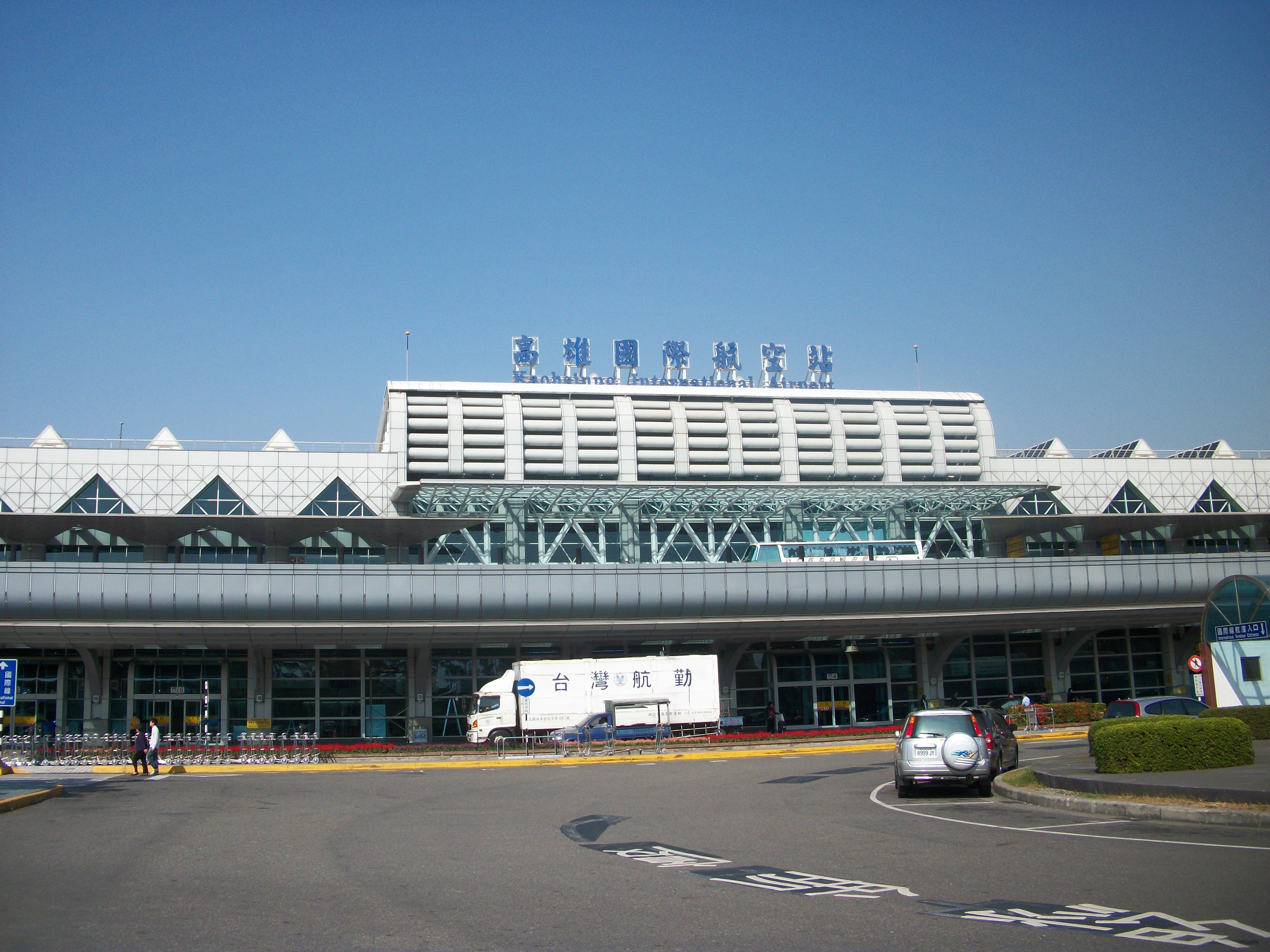
- IATA: KHH; ICAO: RCKH

Summary
- Airport type: Public
- Owner/Operator: Civil Aeronautics Administration
- Serves: Kaohsiung
- Location: Siaogang District, Kaohsiung, Taiwan
- Opened: 1 July 1965; 61 years ago
- Hub for: Uni Air; Mandarin Airlines
- Focus city for: China Airlines; EVA Air; Tigerair Taiwan
- Elevation AMSL: 9 m (30 ft)
- Coordinates: 22°34′37″N 120°21′00″E

Map
- Location of airport in Kaohsiung Location of airport in Taiwan

Runways
Direction	Length		Surface
Direction	m	ft	Surface
09/27 (Note: ex-09L/27R)	3,150	10,335	Concrete

Statistics (2025)
- Number of passengers: 6,971,162 ▲18.85%
- Aircraft movements: 59,057 ▲13.70%
- Airfreight movements: 53,442.7 tonnes ▲25.36%
- Source: Civil Aeronautics Administration

Kaohsiung International Airport
- Traditional Chinese: 高雄國際機場
- Simplified Chinese: 高雄国际机场
Transcriptions
Standard Mandarin
- Hanyu Pinyin: Gāoxióng Gúojì Jīchǎng
- Bopomofo: ㄍㄠ ㄒㄩㄥˊ ㄍㄨㄛˊ ㄐㄧˋ ㄐㄧ ㄔㄤˇ
Hakka
- Pha̍k-fa-sṳ: Kô-hiùng Koet-chi Kî-chhòng
Southern Min
- Hokkien POJ: Ko-hiông Kok-chè Ki-tiûⁿ

Siaogang International Airport
- Traditional Chinese: 小港國際機場
- Simplified Chinese: 小港国际机场
Transcriptions
Standard Mandarin
- Hanyu Pinyin: Xiǎogǎng Guójì Jīchǎng
- Bopomofo: ㄒㄧㄠˇ ㄍㄤˇ ㄍㄨㄛˊ ㄐㄧˋ ㄐㄧ ㄔㄤˇ
Hakka
- Pha̍k-fa-sṳ: Séu-kóng Koet-chi Kî-chhòng
Southern Min
- Hokkien POJ: Sió-káng Kok-chè Ki-tiûⁿ

Kaohsiung International Airport (高雄國際機場 (Note: Official name in Chinese is 高雄國際航空站.)) (IATA: KHH, ICAO: RCKH) is an international airport located in Siaogang District, Kaohsiung, Taiwan, also known as Siaogang Airport (小港機場). With 5.8 million passengers in 2024, it is the second busiest airport in Taiwan, after Taoyuan. The airport has a single east–west runway and two terminals: one international and one domestic.

== History ==
=== Early years ===
Originally built as an Imperial Japanese Army Air Squadron base in 1942 during the Japanese rule era of Taiwan, Kaohsiung Airport retained its military purpose until 1945. Due to the need for civil transportation in southern Taiwan, it was demilitarised and converted into a domestic civil airport in 1965, and further upgraded to the status an international airport in 1969, with regular international flights starting in 1972.

During the 1970s and 1980s, direct international flights were rare at the airport, with Hong Kong and Tokyo being the only two destinations. Since the early 1990s, dedicated connection flights to Taipei were inaugurated, bringing convenience to the south as Taipei had more international flights. These contributed to a steady growth in airport passenger and flight movements. A new terminal dedicated to international flights was opened in 1997.

In summer 1998, EVA Air opened a direct flight between Kaohsiung and Los Angeles, but it was discontinued only after six months.

=== Development since the 2000s ===
Since 2009, the number of passengers has been recovering due to the opening of regular scheduled cross-strait flights to China, as well as the rise of low cost carriers.

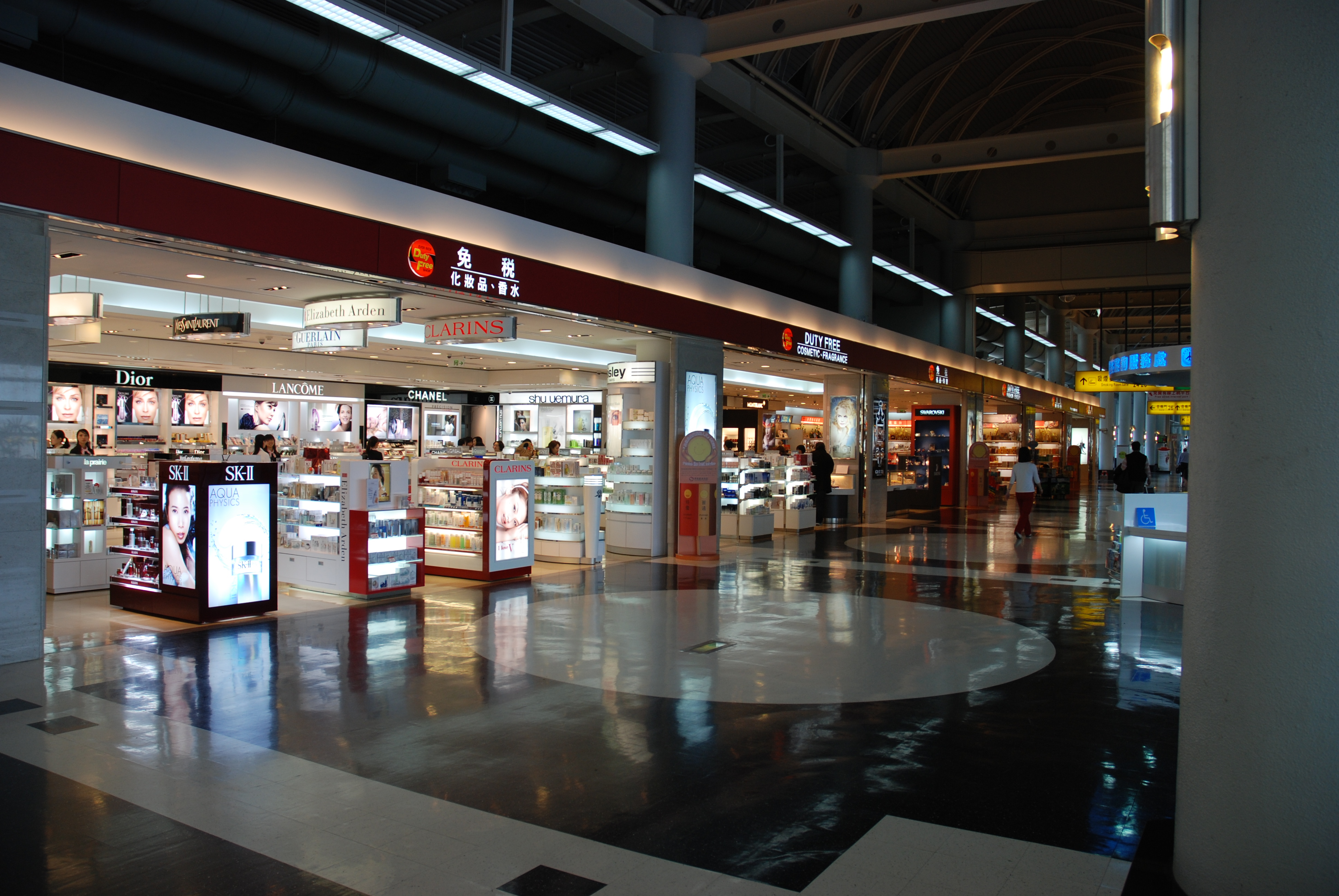
terminal building

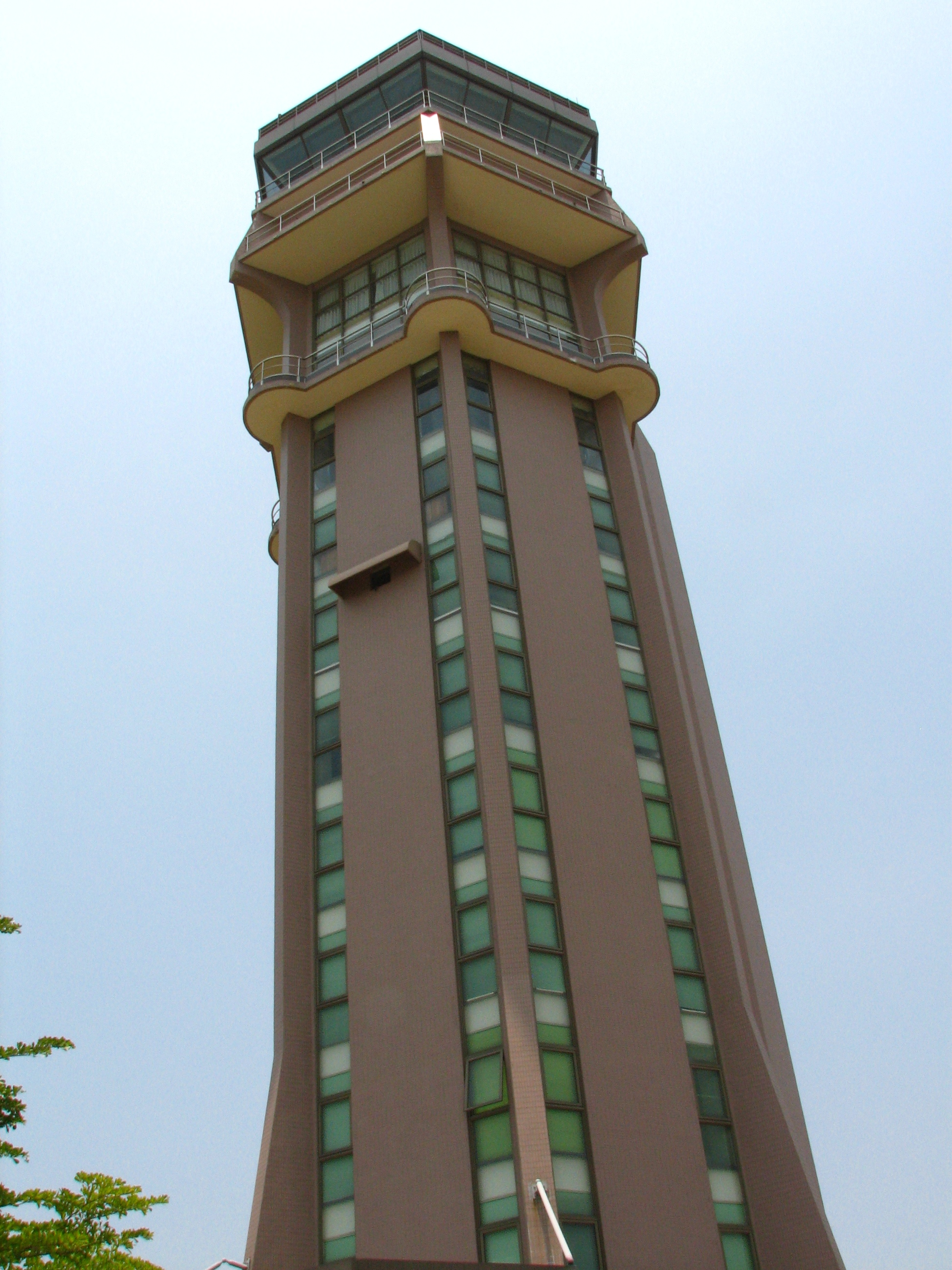
control tower

== Airlines and destinations ==
Airlines	Destinations
Air Busan	Busan
Air Macau	Macau
AirAsia	Kuala Lumpur–International, Osaka–Kansai
Cathay Pacific	Hong Kong
Cebu Pacific	Manila
China Airlines	Bangkok–Suvarnabhumi, Chongqing, Fukuoka, Hong Kong, Kumamoto, Manila, Naha, Osaka–Kansai, Seoul–Incheon, Shanghai–Pudong, Shenzhen, Singapore, Tokyo–Narita
Daily Air	Qimei, Wang-an
EVA Air	Fukuoka, Hong Kong, Macau, Osaka–Kansai, Seoul–Incheon, Shanghai–Pudong, Tokyo–Narita
HK Express	Hong Kong
Jeju Air	Busan, Seoul–Gimpo
Jetstar Japan	Naha (begins 6 December 2026), Tokyo–Narita
Juneyao Air	Shanghai–Pudong
Mandarin Airlines	Hong Kong, Hualien, Matsu–Nangan
Peach	Osaka–Kansai
Philippines AirAsia	Manila
Spring Airlines	Ningbo, Shanghai–Pudong
Starlux Airlines	Kobe, Naha (both begin 1 January 2027)
Thai AirAsia	Bangkok–Don Mueang, Tokyo–Narita
Thai Airways International	Bangkok–Suvarnabhumi
Thai Lion Air	Bangkok–Don Mueang, Naha, Sapporo–Chitose
Tigerair Taiwan	Da Nang, Fukuoka, Ishigaki, Jeju, Komatsu, Kumamoto, Nagoya–Centrair, Naha, Okayama, Osaka–Kansai, Sapporo–Chitose, Sendai, Seoul–Gimpo, Tokyo–Narita; Charter: Phu Quoc
Trinity Airways	Busan, Jeju, Seoul–Gimpo, Seoul–Incheon
United Airlines	Tokyo–Narita
VietJet Air	Hanoi, Ho Chi Minh City
Vietnam Airlines	Hanoi, Ho Chi Minh City
XiamenAir	Fuzhou, Xiamen

== Statistics ==
Operations and statistics
Year	Passenger movements	Airfreight movements (tons)	Aircraft movement
2016	6,416,681	71,447.8	57,446
2017	6,479,183	81,555.3	51,768
2018	6,973,845	73,541.6	60,155
2019	7,506,753	64,676.8	64,015
2020	1,891,762	46,506.3	26,475
2021	836,594	57,087.3	16,317
2022	1,238,674	46,312.5	20,666
2023	4,225,403	40,018.4	40,516
2024	5,865,413	42,629.9	51,940
2025	6,971,162	53,442.7	59,057

Domestic routes from Kaohsiung (2025)
Rank	Airport	Passengers	Carriers
1	Penghu	777,991	
2	Kinmen	404,140	
3	Qimei	17,681	
4	Hualien	17,070	
5	Wang-an	1,766	

Busiest international routes from Kaohsiung (2025)
Rank	Airport	Passengers	Carriers
1	Hong Kong	1,253,468	Cathay Pacific, China Airlines, EVA Air, HK Express
2	Tokyo–Narita	563,125	China Airlines, EVA Air, Thai AirAsia, Tigerair Taiwan, United
3	Osaka–Kansai	562,164	China Airlines, EVA Air, Tigerair Taiwan, Peach, Scoot
4	Seoul–Incheon	415,460	Asiana Airlines, China Airlines, EVA Air, T'way Air
5	Macau	324,799	Air Macau, EVA Air, Tigerair Taiwan
6	Naha	242,680	China Airlines, Tigerair Taiwan
7	Ho Chi Minh City	221,528	Vietnam Airlines, VietJet Air
8	Hanoi	219,186	Vietnam Airlines, VietJet Air
9	Shanghai–Pudong	190,747	China Airlines, EVA Air, Juneyao Air, Spring Airlines
10	Fukuoka	195,040	China Airlines, Eva Air, Tigerair Taiwan

== Accidents and incidents ==
- On 15 February 1969, a Douglas C-47B B-241 of Far Eastern Air Transport was damaged beyond economic repair in an accident at Kaohsiung International Airport.
- On 27 June 1989, a Cessna 404 Titan of Formosa Airlines on its way to Wang-an, Penghu crashed into nearby Cianjhen District streets shortly after takeoff. All 12 people on board were killed; there were no ground casualties.

== Ground transportation ==
- Rail: The airport is served by Kaohsiung Metro Red line at Kaohsiung International Airport, providing access to Taiwan Railway at Kaohsiung Main Station and Taiwan High Speed Rail at Zuoying.
- Coach: There is a one-way coach from Kaohsiung International Airport to Fangliao and Kenting.
- Local bus: Both terminals are served by local buses.

== See also ==
- Civil Aviation Administration (Taiwan)
- Transportation in Taiwan
- List of airports in Taiwan
