= Taitung Airport =

Taitung Airport 臺東航空站 臺東機場
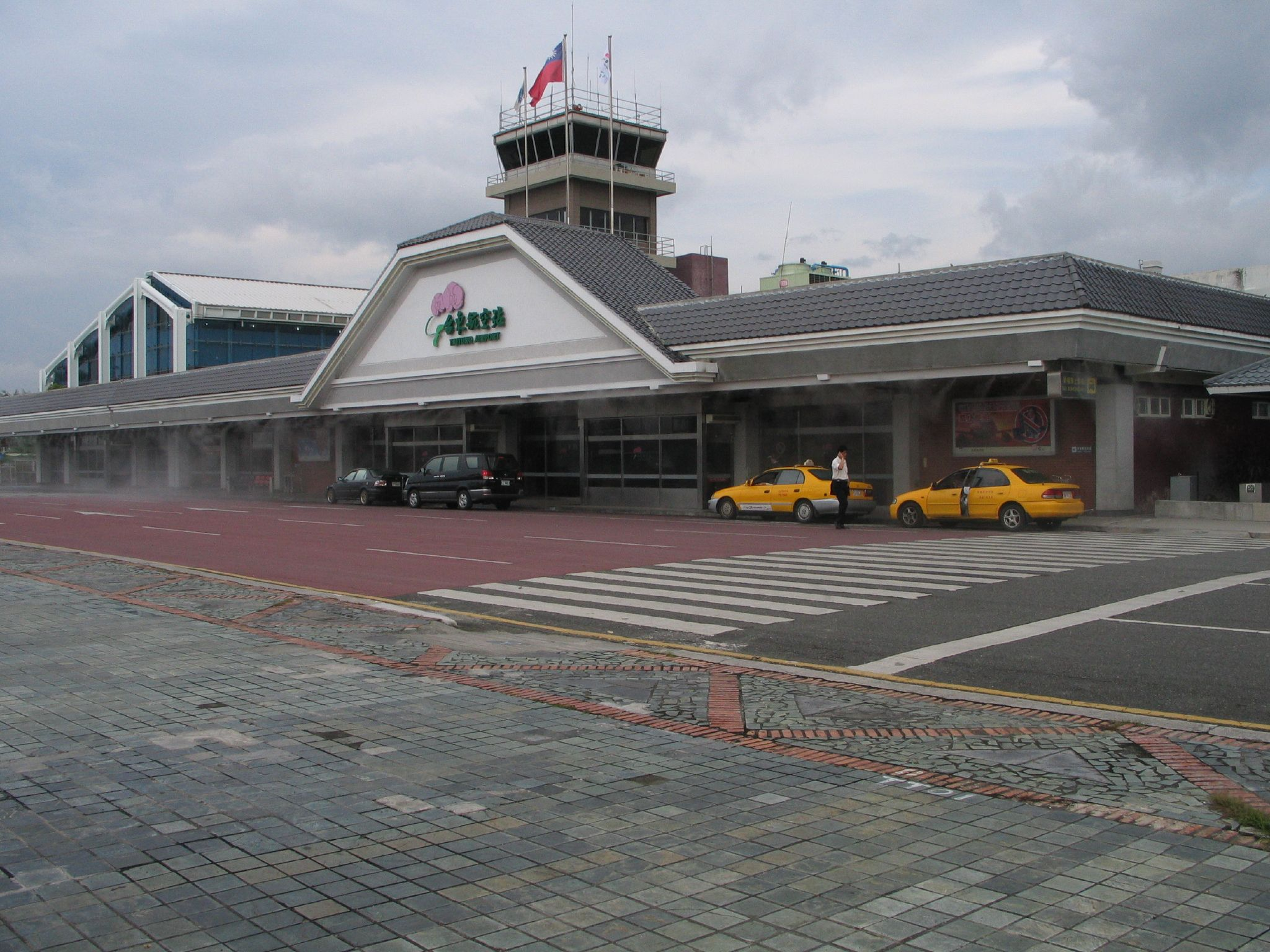
- IATA: TTT; ICAO: RCFN

Summary
- Airport type: Public
- Operator: Civil Aeronautics Administration; Ministry of National Defense
- Serves: Taitung City, Taiwan
- Elevation AMSL: 143 ft (44 m)
- Coordinates: 22°45′17″N 121°06′06″E

Map
- Location of airport in Taitung County Location of airport in Taiwan

Runways
Direction	Length		Surface
Direction	m	ft	Surface
04/22	2,439	8,002	Asphalt

Statistics (2014)
- Number of passengers: 380,139
- Aircraft movements: 13,948
- Sources: Civil Aeronautics Ministry; Sources

Taitung Airport (Chinese: 臺東機場; pinyin: Táidōng Jīchǎng) (IATA: TTT, ICAO: RCFN) is an airport serving Taitung City, in Taitung County, Taiwan. The airport operates from 7am to 6pm.

== History ==
The airport sits on 153.7 hectares of land and began as a holding room facility in 1977. It was upgraded as an official airport on 1 July 1981 and afterwards moved to its current site months later to meet the strategic requirements for the military. On 1 June 2001, it was promoted to become a second class airport, and in September it began its expansion construction to move industries eastwards and boost the local tourism industries. Since 2014, the school APEX flight academy is located on the airport.

== Facilities ==
The airport resides at an elevation of 143 feet (44 m) above mean sea level. It has one runway designated 04/22 with an asphalt surface measuring 2,439 by 45 metres (8,002 ft × 148 ft).

== Airlines and destinations ==
While all flights currently as of June 2025 are domestic, Mandarin Airlines and HK Express previously served the Taitung-Hong Kong route demonstrating the airport's international potential.

Airlines	Destinations
Daily Air	Lanyu, Lyudao
Mandarin Airlines	Taipei–Songshan
Uni Air	Taipei–Songshan

== Ground Transportation ==
The airport is served by buses to and from the city centre.

== See also ==
- Civil Aeronautics Administration (Taiwan)
- Transportation in Taiwan
- List of airports in Taiwan
