= Taichung International Airport =

Airport in Taiwan

Taichung International Airport 臺中國際機場
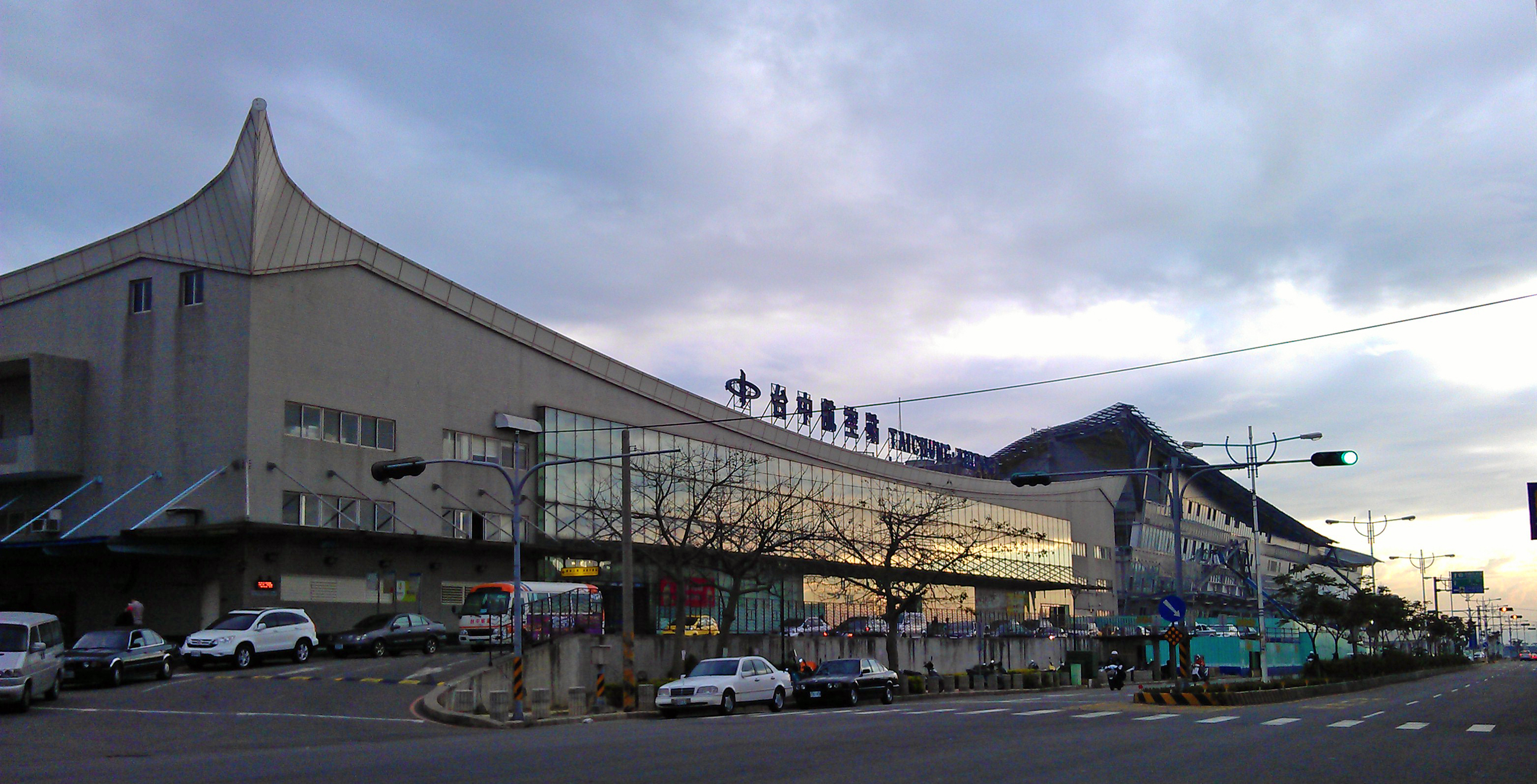
- IATA: RMQ; ICAO: RCMQ

Summary
- Airport type: Public
- Operator: Civil Aeronautics Administration
- Serves: Greater Taichung
- Location: Taichung, Taiwan
- Opened: 5 March 2004; 22 years ago
- Focus city for: Mandarin Airlines; Starlux Airlines
- Elevation AMSL: 203 m (666 ft)
- Coordinates: 24°15′53″N 120°37′14″E

Map
- Location of airport in Taichung Location of airport in Taiwan

Runways
Direction	Length		Surface
Direction	m	ft	Surface
18/36	3,659	12,005	Concrete

Statistics (2024)
- Aircraft movements: 23,500
- Passenger movements: 2,121,825
- Cargo movements in tonnes (2018): 3,757.1

Taichung International Airport (台中國際機場)(IATA: RMQ, ICAO: RCMQ) is an international airport located in Taichung, Taiwan. In 2023, it was the sixth busiest airport in Taiwan, with scheduled services to China, Hong Kong, Japan, Macau, South Korea, and Vietnam.

== History ==
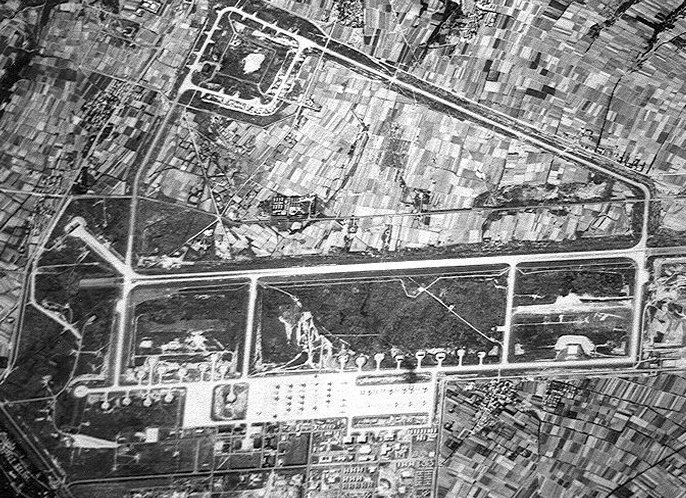
Ching Chuan Kang Air Base airfield

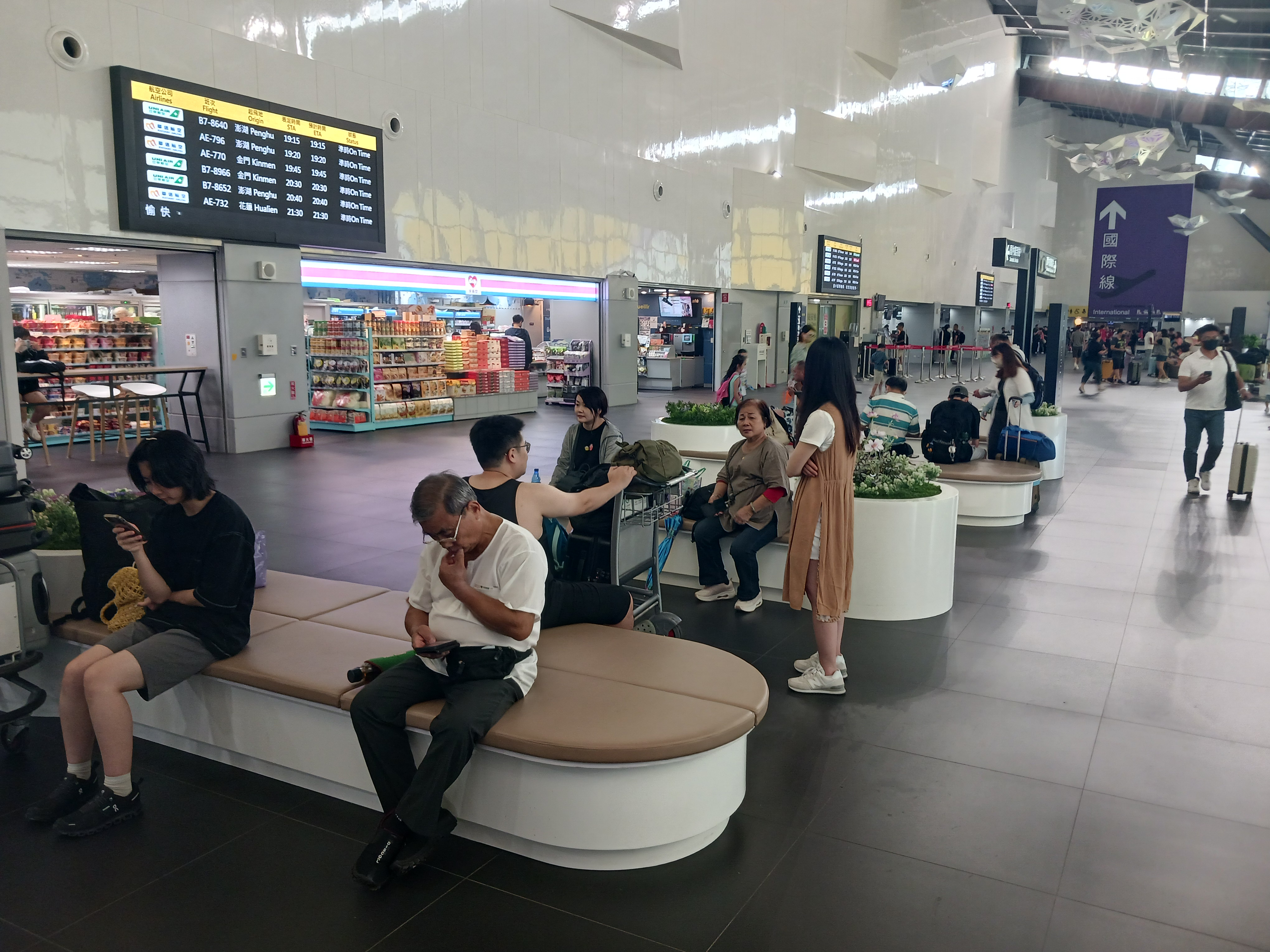
Taichung Airport Terminal 1 lobby

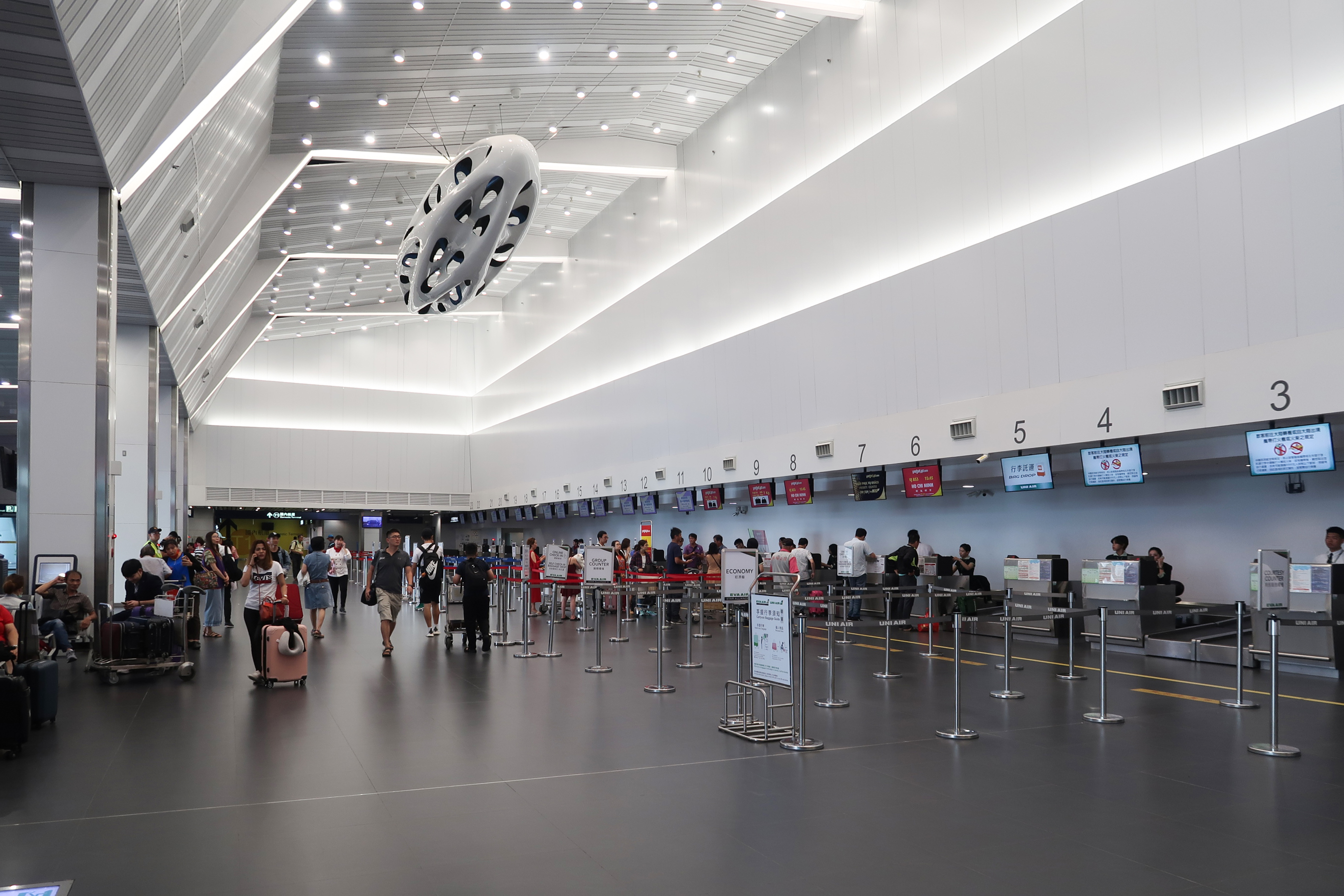
Taichung Airport Terminal 2 departure lobby

=== Developments since the 2000s ===
Construction of passenger facilities was completed in September 2003 and civilian services began on 5 March 2004, replacing the old Shuinan Airport located closer to downtown Taichung. Ching Chuan Kang Airport has since become the only airport serving Taichung. The airport was promoted to an international airport on 3 January 2017, and renamed Taichung International Airport.

== Airlines and destinations ==
The following airlines operate regular passenger flights at Taichung International Airport:

Airlines	Destinations
Air Macau	Macau
China Airlines	Naha; Seasonal: Kitakyushu
China Eastern Airlines	Chengdu–Tianfu
HK Express	Hong Kong
Jin Air	Busan, Seoul–Incheon
Korean Air	Seoul–Incheon
Loong Air	Chengdu
Shandong Airlines	Seasonal: Qingdao
Starlux Airlines	Busan, Kobe, Kumamoto, Macau, Nagoya-Chubu, Naha, Phu Quoc, Shimojishima, Takamatsu, Tokyo–Narita
Tigerair Taiwan	Nagoya-Chubu, Naha
Trinity Airways	Seoul–Incheon

== Statistics ==
Busiest routes from Taichung (2024)
Rank	Airport	Category	Passengers	Carriers
1	Penghu	Domestic	506,097	Mandarin Airlines, Uni Air
2	Kinmen	Domestic	454,118	Mandarin Airlines, Uni Air
3	Hong Kong	International	353,233	HK Express, Hong Kong Airlines
4	Ho Chi Minh City	International	225,329	Mandarin Airlines, VietJet Air
5	Macau	International	209,976	EVA Air, Starlux, Tigerair Taiwan

=== Annual traffic ===
Annual passenger traffic at Taichung Airport 2018–present
Year	Passengers
2018	2,638,774
2019	2,821,967
2020	1,104,631
2021	581,767
2022	937,131
2023	1,499,320
2024	2,121,825

== See also ==
- Civil Aviation Administration (Taiwan)
- Transportation in Taiwan
- List of airports in Taiwan
