= Qimei Airport =

Taiwanese airport on the island of Penghu

Qimei Airport 七美航空站 澎湖七美機場
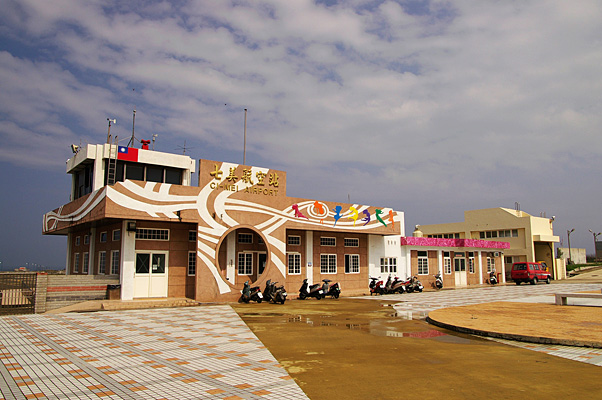
- IATA: CMJ; ICAO: RCCM

Summary
- Airport type: Public
- Operator: Civil Aeronautics Administration
- Serves: Qimei, Penghu, Taiwan
- Elevation AMSL: 63 ft (19 m)
- Coordinates: 23°12′47″N 119°25′03″E

Map
- Location of airport in Penghu Location of airport in Taiwan

Runways
| Direction | Length | | Surface |
| Direction | m | ft | Surface |
|---|---|---|---|
| 02/20 | 843 | 2,766 | Concrete |

Qimei Airport or Chi Mei Airport (Chinese: 七美航空站; Hanyu Pinyin: Qīměi Hángkōngzhàn; Tongyong Pinyin: Ciměi Hángkongjhàn; Pe̍h-ōe-jī: Chhit-bí Hâng-khong-chām) (IATA: CMJ, ICAO: RCCM) is an airport serving Qimei, an island in Penghu, Taiwan.

== History ==
The Penghu County Government approved the building of the airport in 1977 in order to improve access for the residents of the county. The runway was redone in 1995, and is currently under the control of Civil Aeronautics Administration since 11 May 1996.

== Facilities ==
The airport has one runway which is 843 metres (2,766 ft) in length.

== Airlines and destinations ==
| Airlines | Destinations |
|---|---|
| Daily Air | Kaohsiung, Penghu |

== See also ==
- Civil Aeronautics Administration (Taiwan)
- Transportation in Taiwan
- List of airports in Taiwan
- Penghu Airport
