= Lanyu Airport =

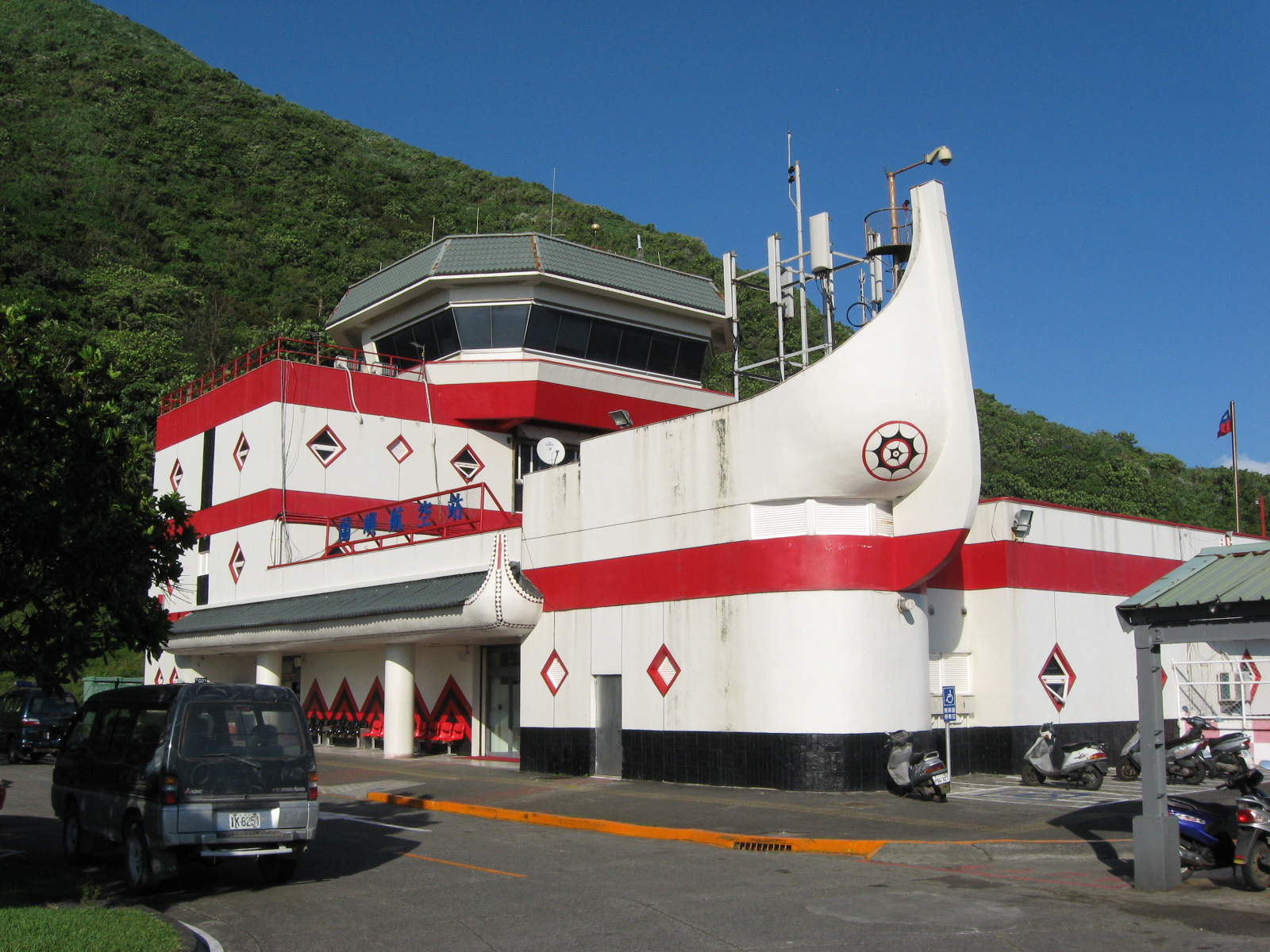
- IATA: KYD; ICAO: RCLY

Summary
- Airport type: Public
- Operator: Civil Aeronautics Administration; Ministry of National Defense
- Serves: Orchid Island
- Location: Orchid Island, Taitung County, Taiwan
- Elevation AMSL: 13.4 m / 44 ft
- Coordinates: 22°01′46″N 121°31′38″E

Map
- Location of airport in Taiwan

Runways
Direction	Length		Surface
Direction	m	ft	Surface
13/31	1,123	3,684	Paved

The Lanyu Airport (Chinese: 蘭嶼機場; pinyin: Lányǔ Jīchǎng; Tao: Seyseykedan No Sikoki No Irala (IATA: KYD, ICAO: RCLY)) is an airport on Orchid Island, Taitung County, Taiwan. The airport does not support night time flying except for emergency medical services flights.

== History ==
The airport was initially controlled by the military, but is now under control of the Civil Aeronautics Administration (CAA) since 1977. Expansion was made to the airport in which it was completed in 1982. Since 1990, the CAA has initiated a series of development projects for further expansion and improvement of the airport.

== Airlines and destinations ==
As of 2025, it only operates daily flights to Taitung.

Airlines	Destinations
Daily Air	Taitung

== Incidents and accidents ==
- On 13 April 2017, Flight 55571, a DHC-6 of Daily Air, experienced a runway excursion and crashed into a guard rail. All of the passengers and flight crew were safe.
- On 7 June 2017, a DHC-6-400 of Daily Air experienced malfunction nose landing gear. All of the passengers and flight crew were safe.

== See also ==
- Civil Aeronautics Administration (Taiwan)
- Transportation in Taiwan
- List of airports in Taiwan
