= Wang-an Airport =

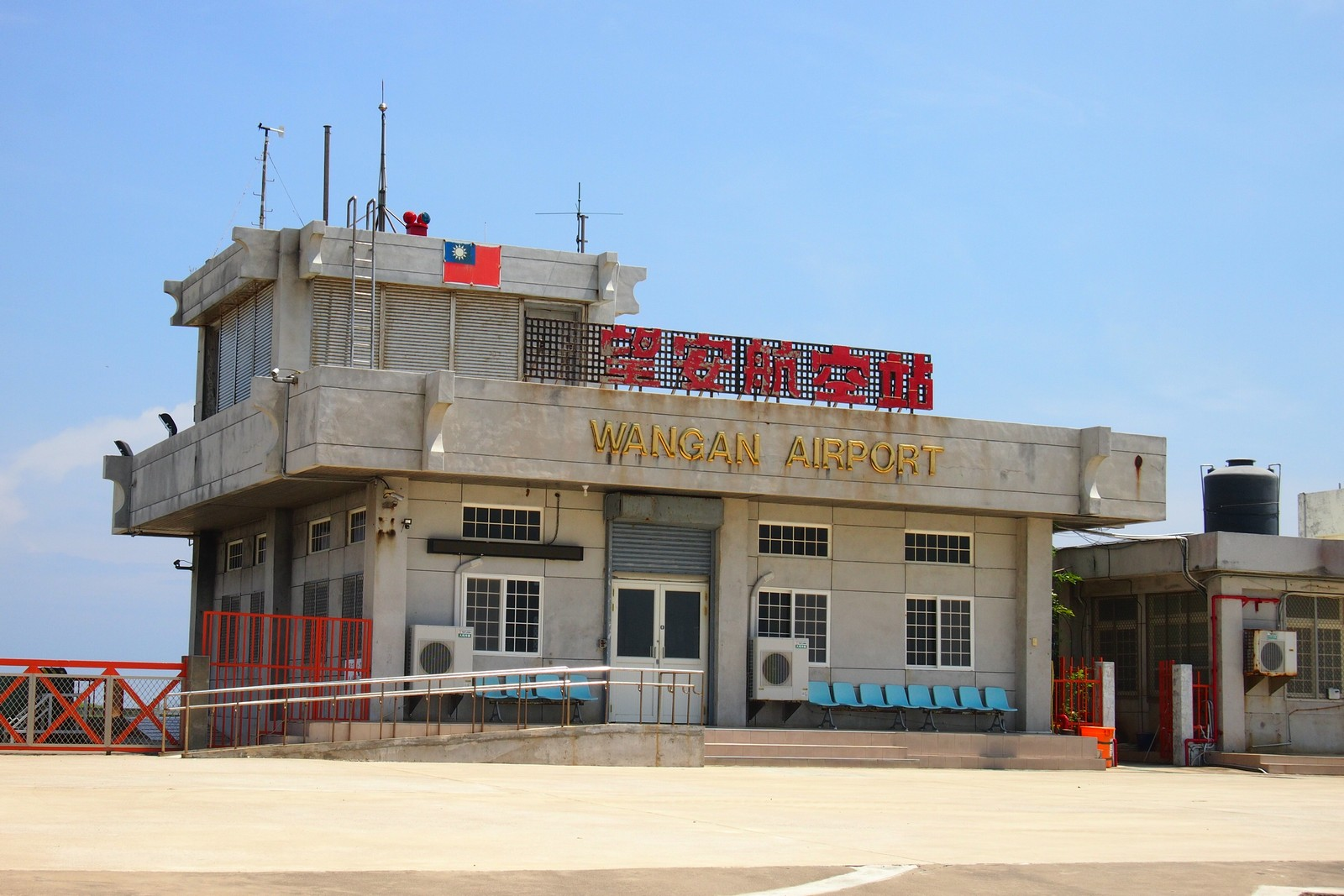
- IATA: WOT; ICAO: RCWA

Summary
- Airport type: Public
- Operator: Civil Aeronautics Administration
- Location: Wang-an Island, Taiwan (ROC)
- Coordinates: 23°22′02.5″N 119°30′08.2″E

Map
- Location of airport in Penghu County Location of airport in Taiwan

Runways
Direction	Length		Surface
Direction	m	ft	Surface
02/20	800	2,723	Asphalt

Statistics (2014)
- Number of passengers: 2,575
- Aircraft movements: 198
- Sources: Civil Aeronautics Ministry

Wang-an Airport (Chinese: 望安機場; pinyin: Wàng'ān Jīchǎng) (IATA: WOT, ICAO: RCWA) is an airport in Wang-an, Penghu Islands, Taiwan (ROC).

== History ==
Construction of the airport started in January 1988, and was completed later that year. On 11 May 1991 the Civil Aeronautics Administration began to manage the airport, and the airport now has an auxiliary status. The runway was resurfaced in 1996.

== Airlines and destinations ==
Airlines	Destinations
Daily Air	Kaohsiung

== See also ==
- Civil Aeronautics Administration (Taiwan)
- Transportation in Taiwan
- List of airports in Taiwan
