= Macau International Airport =

Macau International Airport 澳門國際機場 Aeroporto Internacional de Macau

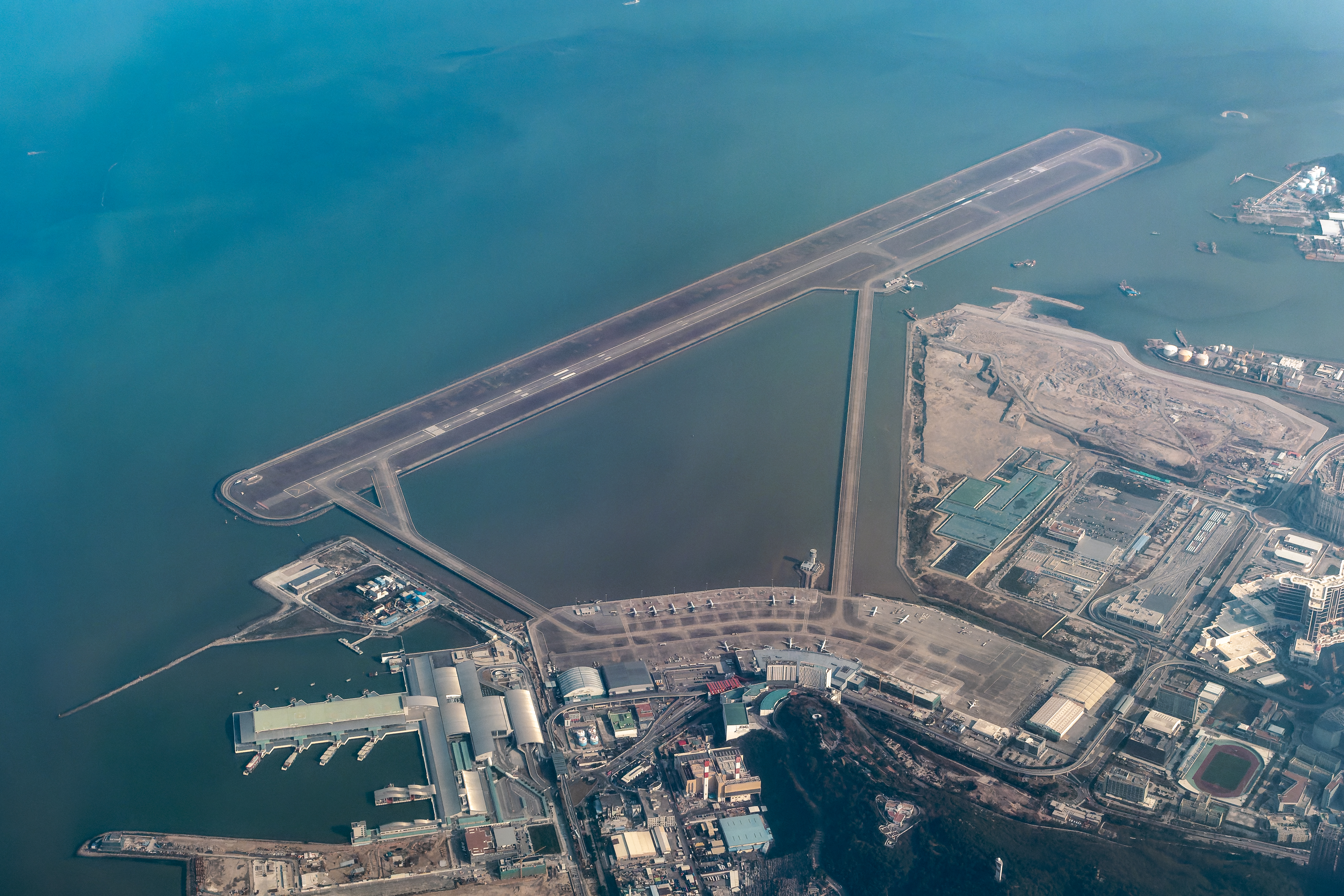
- Aerial view of the airport in 2021
- IATA: MFM; ICAO: VMMC

Summary
- Airport type: Public
- Owner: Government of Macau
- Operator: Sociedade do Aeroporto Internacional de Macau
- Serves: Pearl River Delta
- Location: Taipa, Macau
- Opened: 9 November 1995; 30 years ago
- Hub for: Air Macau
- Elevation AMSL: 6 m (20 ft)
- Coordinates: 22°08′58″N 113°35′29″E
- Website: www.macau-airport.com/en

Map
- Location in Macau

Runways
Direction	Length		Surface
Direction	m	ft	Surface
16/34	3,360	11,024	Asphalt concrete

Statistics (2024)
- Passengers: 7,641,495
- Movements: 59,958
- Cargo (Tonnes): 108,105.209
- Sources: CAM – Macau International Airport Co. Ltd. website

Macau International Airport

Chinese name
- Traditional Chinese: 澳門國際機場
- Simplified Chinese: 澳门国际机场
- Cantonese Yale: Oumùhn Gwokjai Gēichèuhng
Transcriptions
Standard Mandarin
- Hanyu Pinyin: Àomén Guójì Jīchǎng
- Wade–Giles: Ao^{4}men^{2} Kuo^{2}chi^{4} Chi^{1}ch'ang^{3}
Yue: Cantonese
- Yale Romanization: Oumùhn Gwokjai Gēichèuhng
- Jyutping: ou^{3}mun^{4*2} gwok^{3}zai^{3} gei^{1}coeng^{4}

Portuguese name
- Portuguese: Aeroporto Internacional de Macau

Macau International Airport (IATA: MFM, ICAO: VMMC) is an international airport in the special administrative region of Macau, situated at the eastern end of Taipa island and neighbouring waters. It opened for commercial operations on 9 November 1995, during Portuguese administration of the region.

Since its opening, the airport has been a common transfer point for people traveling between mainland China and Taiwan, as well as a passenger hub for destinations in mainland China and Southeast Asia. During 2006, the airport handled 5 million passengers and 220,000 tonnes (220,000 long tons; 240,000 short tons) of cargo. In 2017 the number of passengers had increased to 7,165,803, which is more than the 6 million passengers per year the terminal was originally designed for.

== History ==
Before the opening of Macau airport, the nearest international airport was Kai Tak in British Hong Kong and passengers from Macau had to take a ferry to Hong Kong in order to fly out of Kai Tak. Upon planning, Macau airport was said that it would relieve the congestion at Kai Tak. Macau airport was constructed on reclaimed land adjacent to the islands of Taipa and Coloane. It cost US$1 billion to build. Commercial air service began on 9 November 1995. The first departure was an Air Macau flight to Beijing, and the first arrival was a Malaysia Airlines flight from Kuala Lumpur. The official inauguration ceremony took place on 8 December 1995, and Portuguese president Mário Soares presided over it.

In April 1996, TAP Air Portugal started service to Lisbon using Airbus A340s. It cooperated with Sabena on the route; the flight stopped in Brussels, and TAP allocated a certain number of seats to the airline on the segment between Brussels and Macau. TAP encountered difficulties in running the flights. The crew had to spend long layovers in Macau because the service operated only twice a week. Additionally, TAP and Air Macau, in which the former held a stake, were unable to coordinate their schedules, making connections between the Lisbon flight and Air Macau's network inconvenient. In April 1997, TAP moved the stopover to Bangkok in hopes of attracting more passengers. Nevertheless, it was losing money on the route. The company's chairman stated in November 1997 that he wanted to end the link but that he faced opposition from the Portuguese government, which owned the airline. TAP stopped serving Macau the following year.

== Facilities ==
=== Terminal ===
The airport's designed capacity is 10,000,000 passengers per year, with processing capacity of up to 2,300 passengers per hour.

== Redevelopment ==
Since 2016, Macau's government has been developing a master plan for the airport's expansion. To be done in three phases, the most visible sections of it broke ground in 2020. In 2025 this plan started and is scheduled to be completed in around 2030.

== Airlines and destinations ==
=== Passenger ===
Airlines	Destinations
Air Busan	Busan
Air China	Wuhan
Air Macau	Bangkok–Suvarnabhumi, Beijing–Capital, Changzhou, Chengdu–Shuangliu, Chongqing, Da Nang, Fukuoka, Fuzhou, Guiyang, Hangzhou, Hanoi, Jinan, Kaohsiung, Kuala Lumpur–International, Manila, Nanjing, Nanning, Ningbo, Osaka–Kansai, Qingdao, Seoul–Incheon, Shanghai–Hongqiao, Shanghai–Pudong, Singapore, Taichung, Taipei–Taoyuan, Tokyo–Narita, Wenzhou, Xiamen
AirAsia	Bangkok–Suvarnabhumi, Manila, Kuala Lumpur–International; Charter: Tawau
Bamboo Airways	Da Nang
Cambodia Airways	Vladivostok
Cebu Pacific	Manila
China Eastern Airlines	Beijing–Daxing, Hefei, Nanchang, Nanjing, Shanghai–Hongqiao, Shanghai–Pudong, Wuxi
China Southern Airlines	Beijing–Daxing, Guangzhou (begins 10 December 2026)
EVA Air	Kaohsiung, Taipei–Taoyuan
Hainan Airlines	Haikou
Jeju Air	Seoul–Incheon
Korean Air	Seoul–Incheon
Philippines AirAsia	Cebu
Scoot	Singapore
Shanghai Airlines	Shanghai–Hongqiao, Shanghai–Pudong
Shenzhen Airlines	Nanjing, Wuxi
Sky Angkor Airlines	Phnom Penh
Spring Airlines	Shanghai–Pudong
Starlux Airlines	Taichung, Taipei–Taoyuan
Thai AirAsia	Bangkok–Don Mueang
Thai Lion Air	Bangkok–Don Mueang
Thai VietJet Air	Bangkok–Suvarnabhumi
Vietravel Airlines	Da Nang, Hanoi
West Air	Chongqing
XiamenAir	Fuzhou, Hangzhou, Quanzhou, Xiamen

=== Cargo ===
Airlines	Destinations
Ethiopian Airlines Cargo	Madrid

== Statistics ==
=== Annual traffic ===
Year	Passengers	Airfreight (kg)	Aircraft operations
2012	4,491,065	27,794,488	41,997
2013	5,027,059	26,464,881	48,950
2014	5,481,441	28,767,407	52,559
2015	5,831,459	30,058,277	55,720
2016	6,628,555	32,891,452	56,932
2017	7,165,803	37,499,000	58,520
2018	8,261,412	41,508,955	65,777
2019	9,611,427	42,219,799	77,581
2020	1,173,231	33,346,677	16,962
2021	1,147,015	48,595,307	15,791
2022	599,185	51,400,662	13,642
2023	5,151,080	63,809,785	42,504
2024	7,641,495	108,105,209	59,958
2025	7,521,344	109,292,376	58,196

== Ground transportation ==
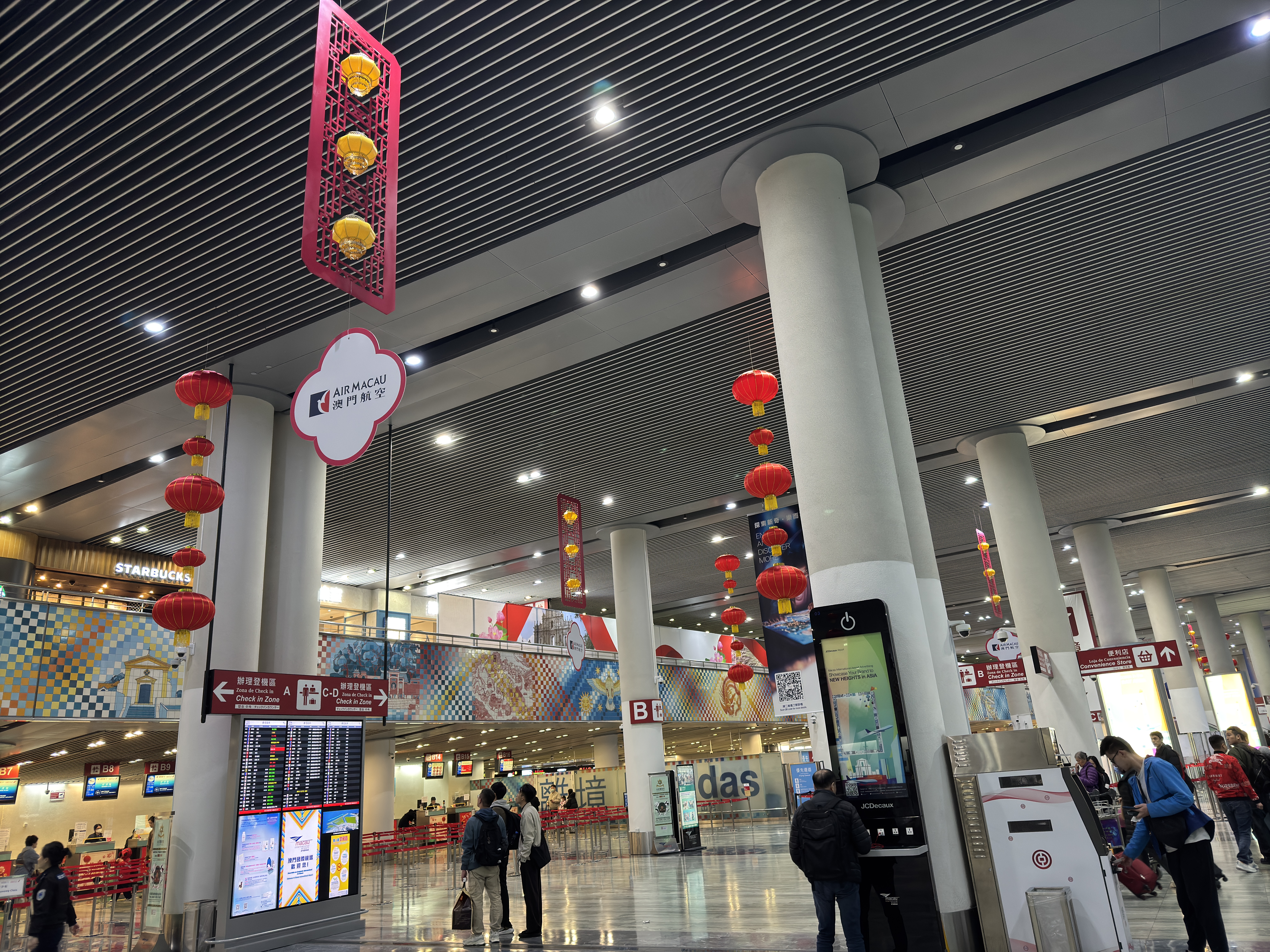
Inside the departure hall

The airport is connected by public transit bus routes, light rail, taxis, private cars, and regional coach services.

=== Air–sea link ===
For passengers transferring to mainland China or Hong Kong, a "two customs, one checkpoint" service is provided. Passengers can use a bus shuttle directly from the airport to the New Macau Ferry Terminal or the Taipa Ferry Terminal without passing Macau immigration.

=== Bus ===
Towards Macau Peninsula, Taipa, Cotai and Coloane

- Transmac routes:
  - 26 – Bacia Norte do Patane ↔ Mercado Municipal de Coloane
  - 51A – The Praia ↔ Av. Vale das Borboletas
  - 51B - Av. Vale das Borboletas ↺ Portas do Cerco
  - AP1 – Portas do Cerco ↺ Aeroporto de Macau
  - MT4 – Parque M. Dr. Sun Yat Sen ↔ Terminal Marítimo de Passageiros da Taipa
- T.C.M. routes:
  - N2 – Bacia Norte do Patane ↔ Terminal Marítimo de Passageiros da Taipa (00:00–06:00)
  - 36 – Rotunda Leonel Sousa ↺ Aeroporto de Macau
  - MT1 – Praceta 24 de Junho ↺ Aeroporto de Macau

=== Cross-border coaches ===
Cross-border coaches connect Macau International Airport with mainland locations like Huadu, Guangzhou, Panyu, Dongguan, Gongbei Port of Entry and Hengqin Border. The "two customs, one checkpoint" service is also available at the Hengqin Border.

=== Light rail ===
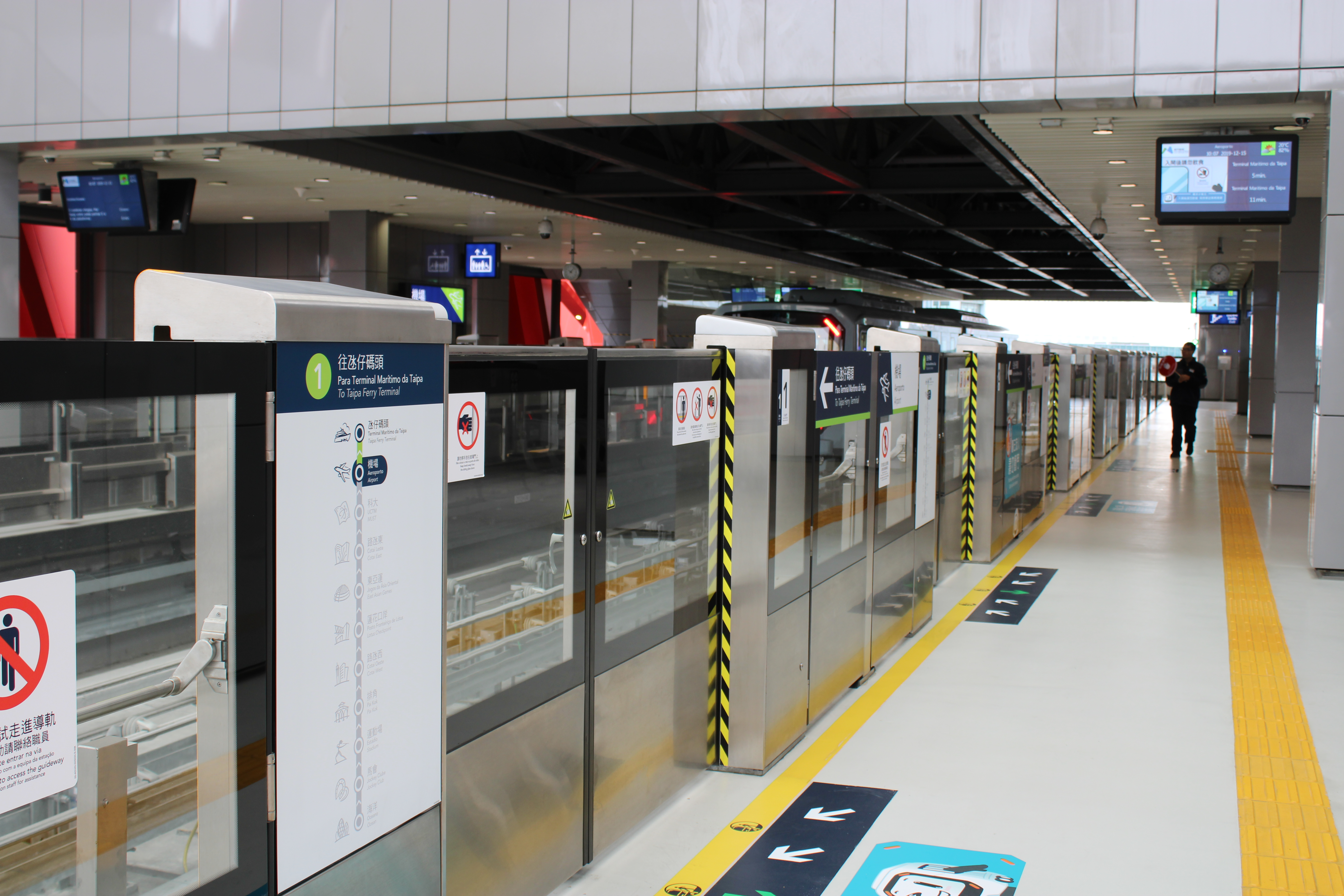
The platform at the airport station

The airport is served by the Airport Station of the Macau Light Rail Transit's Taipa Line at Avenida Wai Long.

== See also ==
- Civil Aviation Authority of Macau SAR
