= Transportation in Taiwan =

Transportation networks and infrastructure in Taiwan

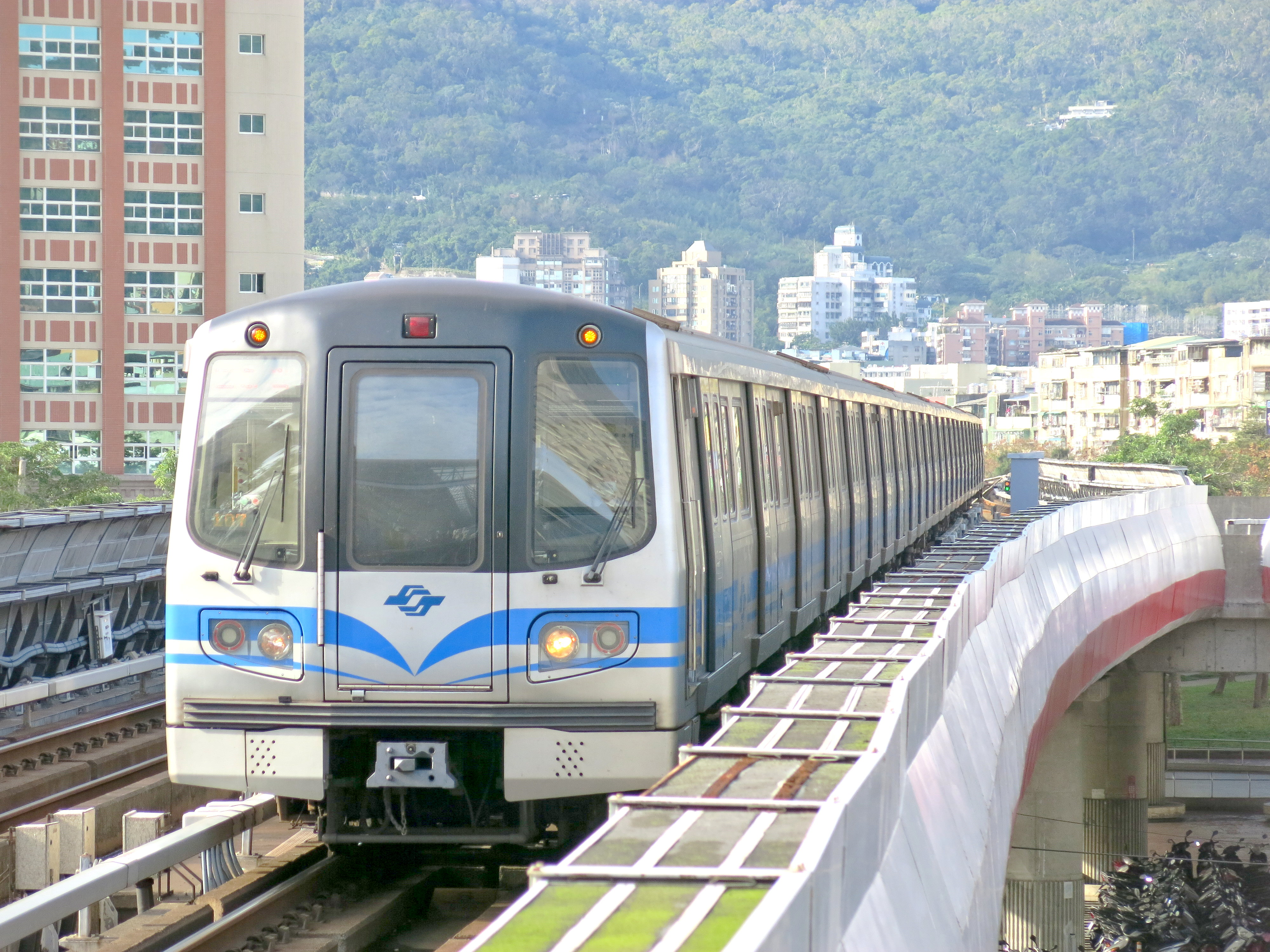
The Taipei Metro

Transportation in Taiwan is overseen by the Ministry of Transportation and Communications and comprises a highly developed network of land, air, and sea transport systems.

== Land transport ==
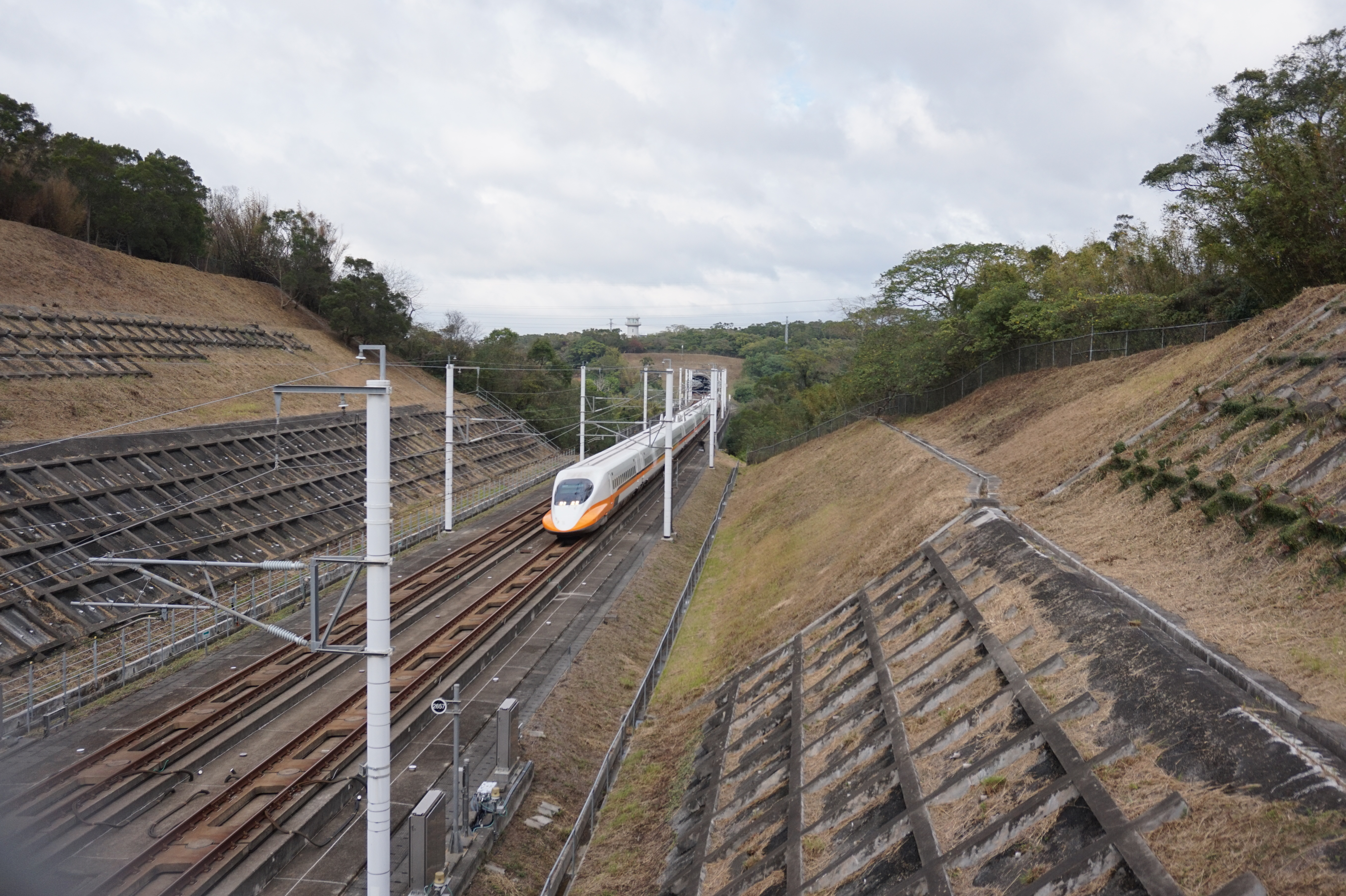
Taiwan High Speed Rail (THSR) 700T Series Shinkansen train.

=== Roads ===
- Total length: 41,475 km (2009)
  - National highway: 901 km
  - Provincial highway: 4,680 km
- Highways: 20,947 km (including 872 km of freeways)
- Urban roads: 16,395, km

=== Rail ===
Railway map of Taiwan

Total: 1,580 km (2009) (all on the island of Taiwan)

- Taiwan Railway: 1,097 km of 1,067 mm (3 ft 6 in) gauge
- Taiwan High Speed Rail: 354 km of 1,435 mm (4 ft 8 1/2 in) gauge
- Kaohsiung Metro: 51.8 km of 1,435 mm (4 ft 8 1/2 in) gauge
- Taipei Metro: 131.1 km of 1,435 mm (4 ft 8 1/2 in) gauge
- New Taipei Metro
- Taoyuan Metro: 51.03 km of 1,435 mm (4 ft 8 1/2 in) gauge
- Taichung MRT
- Taiwan Sugar Corporation: 240 km of 762 mm (2 ft 6 in) gauge
- Forestry Bureau: 86 km of 762 mm (2 ft 6 in) gauge

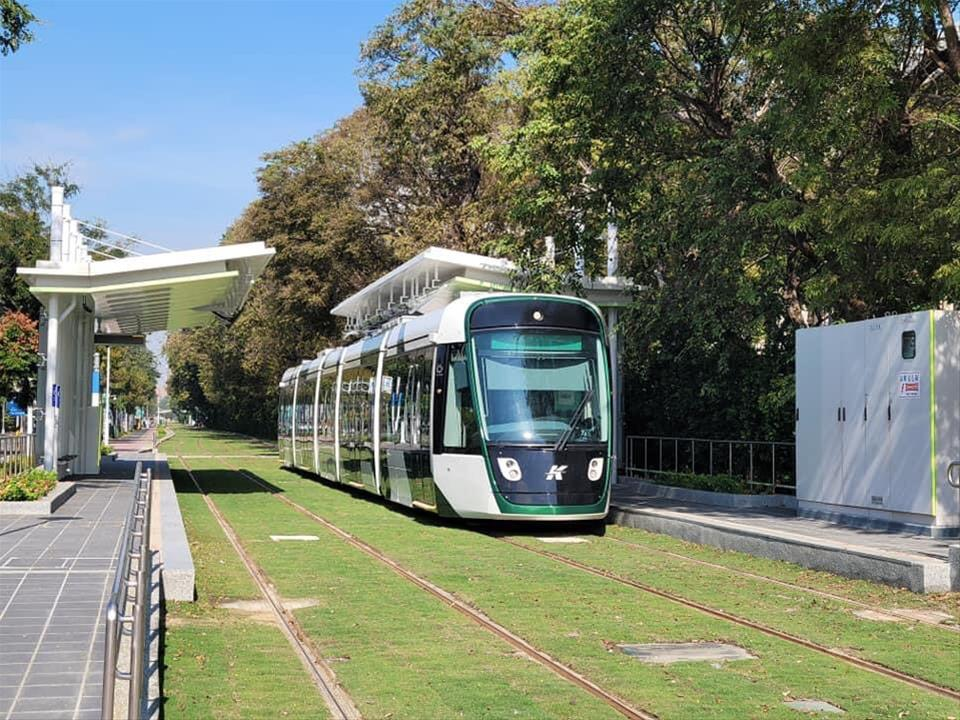
Kaohsiung LRT Citadis 305 tram in trial operation in 2021

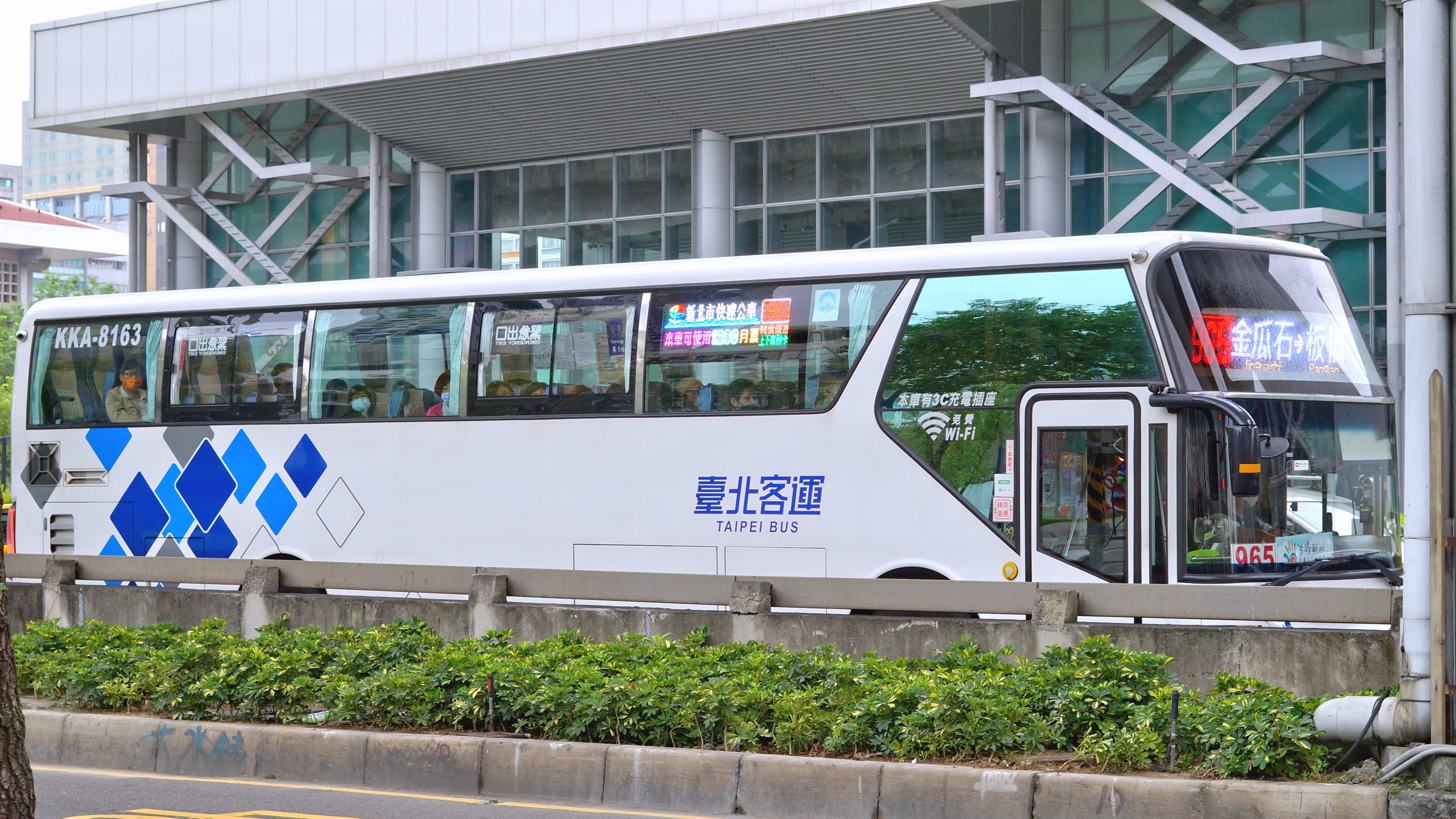
Taipei Bus 965 originating from Jinguashi via Jiufen Old Street and terminating at Banqiao Bus Station.

==== High-speed rail ====
The Taiwan High Speed Rail (THSR) commenced operations on 5 January 2007, after some delays in 2006. The THSR connects Taipei City in the northeast of the island of Taiwan to Kaohsiung City in the southwest. The journey time is about 90 minutes compared to ~3 hours by conventional rail. 30 Shinkansen Class 700T sets are running on the 345 km high-speed line, with station stops at Taipei Main Station, Banqiao, Taoyuan, Hsinchu, Taichung, Chiayi, Tainan and Zuoying District In Kaohsiung. Four additional stations have been opened: Nangang in eastern Taipei, Miaoli, Changhua and Yunlin. In 2008 THSR increased the number of trains to 88 per day, each way.

The Shinkansen 700T is similar to the Japanese 700 Nozomi. It operates in 12 car sets (9 powered, 3 trailers) at a speed limit of 300 km/h over standard gauge 1,435 mm (4 ft 8 1/2 in) track. OCS power is 25 kV AC 60 Hz.

==== Conventional rail ====
The Taiwan Railways Administration (TRA) is the national conventional passenger railway operator in Taiwan, established on 5 March 1948. Railway services began in 1891 between Keelung and Hsinchu under mainland China's Qing Dynasty, with a complete reform intended under the Japanese Colonial Government. This Japanese influence remains in TRA's various operations today, where JR (Japan Railways) tack layout, fare gates, and signage can still be observed. With increased competition from the Taiwan High Speed Rail for long-distance services on the west coast, TRA has begun placing emphases on commuter and tourist services.

==== Urban transit ====
There are five urban transit systems in Taiwan: Taipei Metro, New Taipei Metro, Taichung MRT, Taoyuan Metro, and Kaohsiung Metro.

Taipei Metro opened in 1996 and runs on an extensive network of both Multiple Unit for the high-capacity system as well as VAL for the medium-capacity system throughout the metropolitan area of Taipei. The metro system operates 6 lines consisting of 131 stations.

Kaohsiung Metro is a metro system that currently has two lines, the Red line, and the Orange line consisting of 37 Stations. Both of these lines opened In 2008. Along with these lines, the Yellow line is under construction, and will cover nearly 42% of the city's population, having an expected daily ridership of 180,000 and is to be completed by 2028. The metro currently runs in 3 car sets manufactured by Siemens.

The Taoyuan Metro is a metro system with one operational line, one in construction, and one in planning. (Airport MRT, green, brown). The Airport MRT serves Taoyuan, Taipei and New Taipei after it opened in March 2017.

Taichung MRT officially began operation on April 25, 2021, with its Green line opening. In addition to Taichung, the network will also serve the Changhua and Nantou counties. The metro will start off with 3 main lines (Green, Blue, and Orange), with four other lines planned.

=== Buses ===
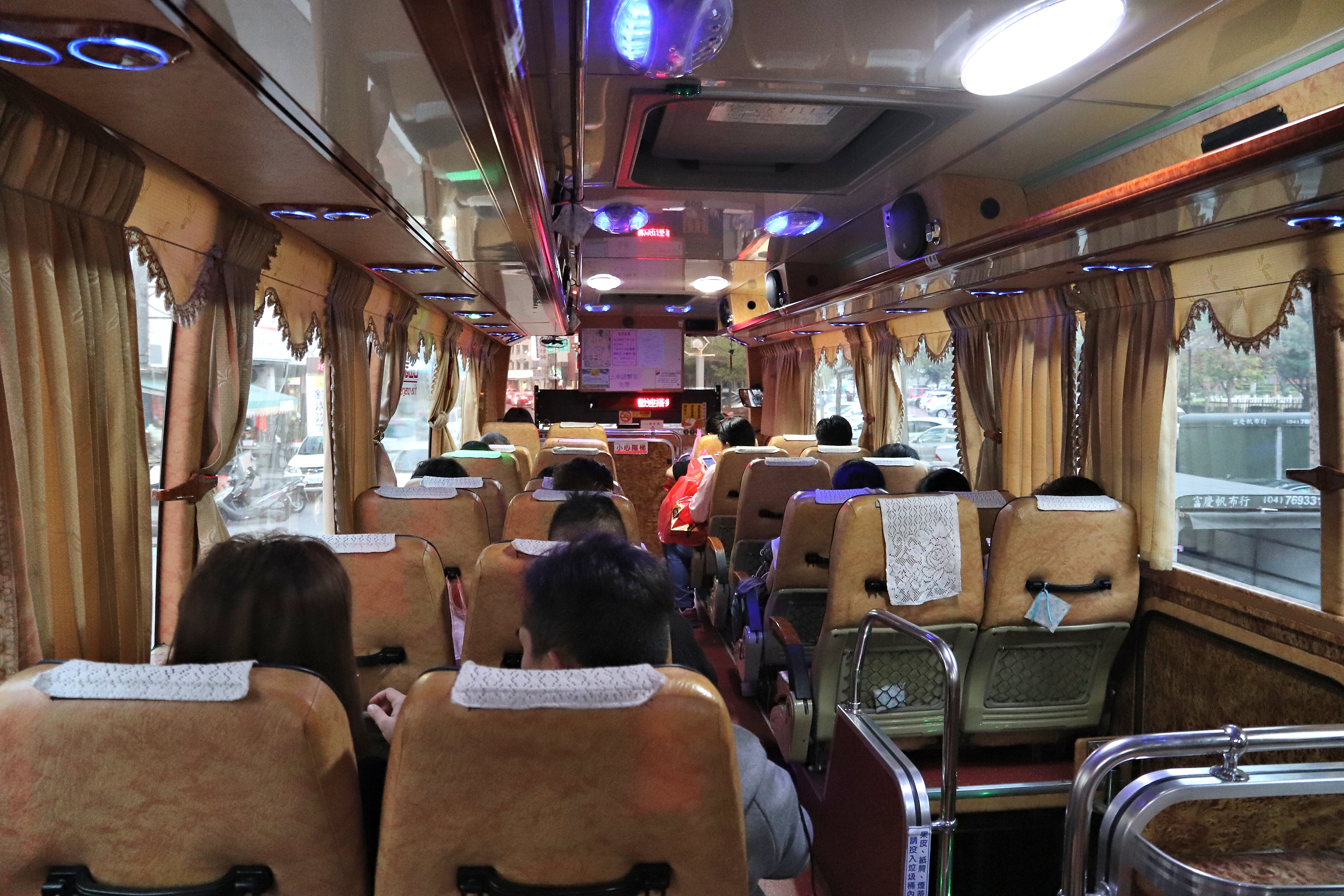
Interior of a long distance bus in Taiwan

Various conventional urban and intercity bus operators conduct services in Taipei and other major cities. Some of the most notable players include Taipei Bus (台北客運) and Capitol Bus (首都客運).

==== Taichung and Chiayi BRT ====
Taichung's BRT (Bus Rapid Transit) was the first BRT system in Taiwan, spanning 17.1 kilometres (10.6 mi) from Taichung TRA Station to Providence University via the Taiwan Boulevard, containing 21 dedicated right-of-way stations. This line was shut down and converted to a dedicated bus lane on July 8, 2015. The original Blue Line become route 300 Taiwan Boulevard Trunk Bus.

Chiayi's Bus Rapid Transit system remains in service, connecting Chiayi High Speed Rail station to downtown Chiayi City via Chiayi County. It uses dedicated bus lanes and GPS-controlled traffic signals to speed up commutes between terminals.

== Air transport ==
=== Airports ===
During the global COVID-19 pandemic traffic at Taiwan’s large international airports fell sharply while traffic to smaller domestic airports increased as a result of a surge in domestic tourism.

Total: 40

Length of runways:

- Over 3,047 m: 6 (Taipei Taoyuan, Taichung, Kaohsiung, Tainan, Chiayi, Pingtung)
- 2,438 to 3,047 m: 5 (Kinmen, Magong, Hualien, Taipei Songshan, Taitung)
- 1,524 to 2,437 m: 2 (Hengchun, Nangan)
- 914 to 1,523 m: 4 (Beigan, Lanyu, Lyudao, Wang-an)
- Under 914 m: 1 (Qimei)

=== Airlines ===
Total: 7

1. China Airlines
2. Daily Air
3. EVA Air
4. Mandarin Airlines
5. Tigerair Taiwan
6. Uni Air
7. Starlux Airlines

=== Heliports ===
Total: 31 (2013)

== Sea transport ==
=== Ports ===
Port of Kaohsiung Is the largest port in Taiwan, and the thirteenth largest in the world. It is located near the Western districts In Kaohsiung, including Gushan, Yancheng, Lingya, Cianjhen, Siaogang, and Cijin. The port Is easily accessible by Sizihwan metro station, and by various Light Rail stations.

Other Major ports: Keelung, Taichung, Hualien

General ports: Anping, Su'ao, Taipei

Interior ports: Budai, Magong

Merchant marine: 112 ships (1,000 GT or over) totaling 3,827,173 GT/6,121,877 tonnes deadweight (DWT) (2010)
ships by type:

- Bulk 35
- Cargo 20
- Chemical tanker 1
- Container 31
- Petroleum tanker 12
- Passenger/cargo 4
- Refrigerated cargo 7
- Roll on/roll off 2

== Pipelines ==
As of 2013, Taiwan maintains the following pipelines

- Condensate 25 km
- Gas 802 km
- Oil 241 km

== See also ==
- Plug-in electric vehicles in Taiwan
- Maritime industries of Taiwan
