= List of airports in Taiwan =

Airports in Taiwan
- Major airports
- Intermediate airports
- Minor airports
- Military airbase
Taiwanese Military airports in the South China Sea
- Military Airbase

This is a list of airports in Taiwan, grouped by type and sorted by number of passengers.

== Airports ==
Airport names shown in bold indicate the airport currently has regular international flights.

City–Location	ICAO	IATA	Airport name	Passengers 2025	Movement 2025	Coordinates
Civil
Taipei–Taoyuan	RCTP	TPE	**Taiwan Taoyuan International Airport**	47,795,969	262,217	25°04′35″N 121°13′26″E
Kaohsiung	RCKH	KHH	**Kaohsiung International Airport**	6,971,162	59,057	22°34′37″N 120°21′00″E
Taipei–Songshan	RCSS	TSA	**Taipei Songshan Airport**	5,624,611	52,022	25°04′10″N 121°33′06″E
Taichung	RCMQ	RMQ	**Taichung International Airport**	2,758,195	27,235	24°15′52″N 120°37′14″E
Magong	RCQC	MZG	Penghu Airport	2,401,323	35,946	23°34′00″N 119°37′48″E
Kinmen	RCBS	KNH	Kinmen Airport	2,149,727	27,882	24°25′40″N 118°21′33″E
Nangan	RCFG	LZN	Matsu Nangan Airport	342,493	5,790	26°09′35″N 119°57′30″E
Tainan	RCNN	TNN	Tainan Airport	272,777	4,361	22°57′01″N 120°12′20″E
Taitung	RCFN	TTT	Taitung Airport	257,611	41,545	22°45′17″N 121°06′06″E
Hualien	RCYU	HUN	**Hualien Airport**	82,461	2,331	24°01′23″N 121°37′04″E
Chiayi	RCKU	CYI	Chiayi Airport	82,409	1,366	23°27′42″N 120°23′34″E
Beigan	RCMT	MFK	Matsu Beigan Airport	76,649	1,688	26°13′26″N 120°00′09″E
Lanyu	RCLY	KYD	Lanyu Airport	32,627	2,306	22°01′46″N 121°31′38″E
Cimei	RCCM	CMJ	Qimei Airport	22,115	1,947	23°12′47″N 119°25′03″E
Lyudao	RCGI	GNI	Lüdao Airport	22,015	2,232	22°40′25″N 121°27′59″E
Wang'an	RCWA	WOT	Wang-an Airport	1,766	170	23°22′00″N 119°30′06″E
Hengchun	RCKW	HCN	Hengchun Airport	N/A	N/A	22°02′17″N 120°43′49″E
Hsinchu	RCPO	HSZ	Hsinchu Airport	N/A	N/A	24°49′05″N 120°56′21″E
Military-only
Pingtung	RCSQ	PIF	Pingtung Airport	N/A	N/A	22°40′20″N 120°27′42″E
Kangshan	RCAY		Kangshan Air Base	N/A	N/A	22°46′57″N 120°15′45″E
Pratas Island (Tungsha/Dongsha)	RCLM	DSX	Dongsha Airport	N/A	N/A	20°42′N 116°43′E
Taiping Island	RCSP		Taiping Island Airport	N/A	N/A	10°22′38″N 114°21′59″E
Taoyuan	RCGM		~~Taoyuan Air Base~~ (defunct)	N/A	N/A	25°03′20″N 121°14′33″E

== See also ==
- Transportation in Taiwan
- List of airports by ICAO code: R#RC - Taiwan
- Wikipedia: WikiProject Aviation/Airline destination lists: Asia#China, Republic of (Taiwan)
