= List of airports by ICAO code: R =

List of airports by ICAO code: A - B - C - D - EB-EG - EH-EY - FA-FM - FN-FZ - G - H - ~~I~~ - J - KA-KH - KI-KP - KR-KZ - LA-LJ - LK-LZ - M - N - O - P - Q - R - SA-SC - SD-SH - SI - SJ - SK-SM - SN-SP - SQ - SS-SU - SV-SY - T - U - V - W - ~~X~~ - Y - Z

== RC - Taiwan ==
Also see airport category and list.

ICAO	IATA	Airport name	Community	Coordinates	Notes
RCAY		Gangshan Airport	Kaohsiung City	22°46′57″N 120°15′45″E	
RCBS	KNH	Kinmen Airport	Kinmen	24°25′40″N 118°21′33″E	
RCCM	CMJ	Cimei Airport	Penghu	23°12′47″N 119°25′03″E	
RCDI		Longtan Army Heliport	Taoyuan City	24°51′18″N 121°14′15″E	
RCFG	LZN	Nangan Airport	Nangan, Lienchiang	26°09′27″N 119°57′23″E	
RCFN	TTT	Taitung Airport	Taitung	22°45′17″N 121°06′06″E	
RCGI	GNI	Lüdao Airport	Taitung	22°40′25″N 121°27′59″E	
RCGM		Taoyuan Air Base	Taoyuan City	25°03′00″N 121°13′59″E	Closed
RCKH	KHH	Kaohsiung International Airport (Siaogang Airport)	Kaohsiung City	22°34′37″N 120°21′00″E	
RCKU	CYI	Chiayi Airport (Shueishang Airport)	Chiayi	23°27′47″N 120°23′26″E	
RCKW	HCN	Hengchun Airport	Pingtung	22°02′17″N 120°43′49″E	Closed
RCLG	TXG	Shuinan Airport	Taichung	24°10′55″N 120°39′23″E	Closed
RCLM	DSX	Dongsha Airport	Pratas Island	20°42′23″N 116°43′16″E	
RCLY	KYD	Lanyu Airport	Taitung	22°01′46″N 121°31′38″E	
RCMQ	RMQ	Taichung International Airport	Taichung	24°15′53″N 120°37′14″E	
RCMT	MFK	Beigan Airport	Beigan, Lienchiang	26°13′26″N 120°00′09″E	
RCNN	TNN	Tainan Airport	Tainan City	22°57′01″N 120°12′20″E	
RCPO	HSZ	Hsinchu Airport	Hsinchu	24°49′05″N 120°56′21″E	
RCQC	MZG	Penghu Airport	Penghu	23°34′00″N 119°37′48″E	
RCQS		Chihhang Air Base	Taitung City	22°47′35″N 121°10′55″E	
RCRA		Zuoying Naval Airfield	Kaohsiung	22°42′16″N 120°16′50″E	
RCSP		Taiping Island Airport	Taiping Island	10°22′38″N 114°21′59″E	
RCSQ	PIF	Pingtung Airport	Pingtung	22°41′43″N 120°28′40″E	Also RCDC
RCSS	TSA	Taipei Songshan Airport	Taipei City	25°04′10″N 121°33′06″E	
RCTP	TPE	Taiwan Taoyuan International Airport	Taoyuan City	25°04′35″N 121°13′26″E	
RCWA	WOT	Wang-an Airport	Penghu	23°22′03″N 119°30′08″E	
RCWK		Xinshe Army Heliport	Taichung	24°13′47″N 120°48′55″E	
RCXY		Nanbao Air Base	Tainan	22°58′54″N 120°17′04″E	
RCYU	HUN	Hualien Airport	Hualien	24°01′23″N 121°37′04″E	

== RJ, RO - Japan ==
Also see airport category and list.

ICAO	IATA	Airport name	Community	Coordinates	Notes
RJAA	NRT	Narita International Airport	Narita, Chiba	35°45′55″N 140°23′08″E	
RJAF	MMJ	Matsumoto Airport	Matsumoto, Nagano	36°10′00″N 137°55′22″E	
RJAH	IBR	Ibaraki Airport (Hyakuri Airfield)	Omitama, Ibaraki	36°10′54″N 140°24′53″E	
RJAK		Kasumigaura Air Field	Kasumigaura, Ibaraki	36°02′05″N 140°11′34″E	
RJAM	MUS	Minami Torishima Airport	Minamitorishima, Tokyo	24°17′23″N 153°58′45″E	
RJAN		Niijima Airport	Niijima, Tokyo	34°22′10″N 139°16′07″E	
RJAT		Camp Fuji Airfield	Gotemba, Shizuoka	35°19′04″N 138°52′20″E	
RJAW	IWO	Central Field (Iwo Jima Air Base)	Ogasawara, Tokyo	24°47′05″N 141°19′27″E	
RJAZ		Kōzushima Airport	Kōzushima, Tokyo	34°11′22″N 139°08′01″E	
RJBB	KIX	Kansai International Airport	Izumisano, Tajiri, Sennan, Osaka	34°25′50″N 135°13′49″E	
RJBD	SHM	Nanki-Shirahama Airport	Shirahama, Wakayama	33°39′44″N 135°21′52″E	
RJBE	UKB	Kobe Airport	Kobe, Hyōgo	34°37′58″N 135°13′26″E	
RJBH	HIW	Hiroshima Heliport	Hiroshima, Hiroshima	34°22′01″N 132°24′50″E	Closed
RJBK	OKS	Kōnan Airport (Kounan)	Okayama, Okayama	34°35′29″N 133°56′00″E	
RJBM		Maizuru Heliport	Maizuru, Kyoto	35°29′25″N 135°22′38″E	
RJBT	TJH	Tajima Airport	Toyooka, Hyōgo	35°30′46″N 134°47′13″E	
RJCA		Asahikawa Air Field	Asahikawa, Hokkaidō	43°47′40″N 142°21′54″E	
RJCB	OBO	Tokachi-Obihiro Airport (Obihiro)	Obihiro, Hokkaidō	42°44′00″N 143°13′02″E	
RJCC	CTS	New Chitose Airport	Chitose, Hokkaidō	42°46′31″N 141°41′33″E	
RJCH	HKD	Hakodate Airport	Hakodate, Hokkaidō	41°46′12″N 140°49′19″E	
RJCJ		Chitose Air Base	Chitose, Hokkaidō	42°47′40″N 141°39′59″E	
RJCK	KUH	Kushiro Airport	Kushiro, Hokkaidō	43°02′27″N 144°11′35″E	
RJCM	MMB	Memanbetsu Airport	Memanbetsu, Hokkaidō	43°52′50″N 144°09′51″E	
RJCN	SHB	Nakashibetsu Airport	Nakashibetsu, Hokkaidō	43°34′39″N 144°57′36″E	
RJCO	OKD	Okadama Airport (Sapporo Okadama)	Sapporo, Hokkaidō	43°07′03″N 141°22′53″E	
RJCR	RBJ	Rebun Airport	Rebun, Hokkaidō	45°27′18″N 141°02′21″E	Closed
RJCT		Tokachi Airfield (formerly Obihiro Airport)	Obihiro, Hokkaidō	42°53′25″N 143°09′30″E	
RJCW	WKJ	Wakkanai Airport	Wakkanai, Hokkaidō	45°24′16″N 141°48′08″E	
RJDA		Amakusa Airfield	Amakusa, Kumamoto	32°28′56″N 130°09′32″E	
RJDB	IKI	Iki Airport	Iki, Nagasaki	33°44′57″N 129°47′09″E	
RJDC	UBJ	Yamaguchi Ube Airport	Ube, Yamaguchi	33°55′48″N 131°16′43″E	
RJDK		Kamigoto Airport	Shinkamigoto, Nagasaki	33°00′49″N 129°11′33″E	
RJDM		Metabaru Air Field	Kamimine, Saga	33°19′31″N 130°24′49″E	
RJDO		Ojika Airport (Nagasaki Ojika)	Ojika, Nagasaki	33°11′27″N 129°05′25″E	
RJDT	TSJ	Tsushima Airport	Tsushima, Nagasaki	34°17′06″N 129°19′50″E	
RJDU	OMJ	Omura Air Base	Omura, Nagasaki	32°55′41″N 129°56′03″E	
RJEB	MBE	Monbetsu Airport (Okhotsk-Monbetsu)	Monbetsu, Hokkaidō	44°18′15″N 143°24′15″E	
RJEC	AKJ	Asahikawa Airport	Asahikawa, Hokkaidō	43°40′15″N 142°26′51″E	
RJEO	OIR	Okushiri Airport	Okushiri, Hokkaidō	42°04′18″N 139°25′58″E	
RJER	RIS	Rishiri Airport	Rishirifuji, Hokkaidō	45°14′31″N 141°11′15″E	
RJFA		Ashiya Air Base	Ashiya, Fukuoka	33°52′53″N 130°39′06″E	
RJFC	KUM	Yakushima Airport	Yakushima, Kagoshima	30°23′08″N 130°39′33″E	
RJFE	FUJ	Fukue Airport	Gotō, Fukue, Nagasaki	32°39′59″N 128°49′58″E	
RJFF	FUK	Fukuoka Airport	Fukuoka, Fukuoka	33°35′04″N 130°27′06″E	
RJFG	TNE	New Tanegashima Airport	Tanegashima, Kagoshima	30°36′18″N 130°59′30″E	
RJFK	KOJ	Kagoshima Airport	Kirishima, Kagoshima	31°48′12″N 130°43′01″E	
RJFM	KMI	Miyazaki Airport	Miyazaki, Miyazaki	31°52′38″N 131°26′55″E	
RJFN		Nyutabaru Air Base	Shintomi, Miyazaki	32°05′01″N 131°27′05″E	
RJFO	OIT	Oita Airport	Kunisaki, Ōita	33°28′46″N 131°44′14″E	
RJFR	KKJ	Kitakyūshū Airport (Kokuraminami Airport)	Kitakyūshū, Fukuoka	33°50′44″N 131°02′06″E	
RJFS	HSG	Saga Airport (Kyushu Saga International Airport)	Kawasoe, Saga	33°08′59″N 130°18′08″E	
RJFT	KMJ	Kumamoto Airport	Mashiki, Kumamoto	32°50′14″N 130°51′19″E	
RJFU	NGS	Nagasaki Airport	Ōmura, Nagasaki	32°55′01″N 129°54′49″E	
RJFW		Sasebo Heliport	Sasebo, Nagasaki	33°10′24″N 129°39′21″E	
RJFY		Kanoya Air Field	Kanoya, Kagoshima	31°22′05″N 130°50′17″E	
RJFZ		Tsuiki Air Field	Tsuiki, Fukuoka	33°41′06″N 131°02′25″E	
RJGG	NGO	Chūbu Centrair International Airport (Centrair)	Tokoname, Aichi	34°51′30″N 136°48′19″E	
RJKA	ASJ	Amami Airport	Amami, Kagoshima	28°25′51″N 129°42′45″E	
RJKB	OKE	Okinoerabu Airport	Wadomari, Kagoshima	27°25′54″N 128°42′20″E	
RJKI	KKX	Kikai Airport (Kikaijima Airport/Kikaiga Shima Airport)	Kikai, Kagoshima	28°19′17″N 129°55′41″E	
RJKN	TKN	Tokunoshima Airport	Tokunoshima, Kagoshima	27°50′11″N 128°52′53″E	
RJNA	NKM	Nagoya Airfield/Komaki Air Base	Nagoya, Aichi	35°15′18″N 136°55′28″E	
RJNF	FKJ	Fukui Airport	Harue, Fukui	36°08′34″N 136°13′26″E	
RJNG		Gifu Air Field	Gifu, Gifu	35°23′40″N 136°52′10″E	
RJNH		Hamamatsu Air Base	Hamamatsu, Shizuoka	34°45′01″N 137°42′11″E	
RJNK	KMQ	Komatsu Airport	Komatsu, Ishikawa	36°23′38″N 136°24′27″E	
RJNO	OKI	Oki Airport	Okinoshima, Shimane	36°10′42″N 133°19′24″E	
RJNS	FSZ	Shizuoka Airport (Mt. Fuji Shizuoka Airport)	Makinohara, Shimada, Shizuoka	34°47′46″N 138°11′22″E	
RJNT	TOY	Toyama Airport	Toyama, Toyama	36°38′54″N 137°11′15″E	
RJNW	NTQ	Noto Airport (Noto Satoyama Airport)	Wajima, Ishikawa	37°17′36″N 136°57′44″E	
RJNY		Shizuhama Air Base	Yaizu, Shizuoka	34°48′46″N 138°17′53″E	
RJOA	HIJ	Hiroshima Airport	Mihara, Hiroshima	34°26′10″N 132°55′10″E	
RJOB	OKJ	Okayama Airport (Okayama Momotaro Airport)	Okayama, Okayama	34°45′25″N 133°51′19″E	
RJOC	IZO	Izumo Airport	Hikawa, Shimane	35°24′49″N 132°53′24″E	
RJOE		Akeno Air Field	Ise, Mie	34°32′00″N 136°40′20″E	
RJOF		Hōfu Air Field	Hōfu, Yamaguchi	34°02′04″N 131°32′47″E	
RJOH	YGJ	Miho-Yonago Airport	Yonago, Tottori	35°29′32″N 133°14′11″E	
RJOI	IWK	MCAS Iwakuni (Iwakuni Kintaikyo Airport)	Iwakuni, Yamaguchi	34°08′38″N 132°14′08″E	
RJOK	KCZ	Kōchi Airport (Kōchi Ryōma Airport)	Nankoku, Kōchi	33°32′46″N 133°40′10″E	
RJOM	MYJ	Matsuyama Airport	Matsuyama, Ehime	33°49′38″N 132°41′59″E	
RJOO	ITM	Osaka International Airport (Itami Airport)	Toyonaka, Ikeda, Osaka, Itami, Hyōgo	34°47′04″N 135°26′21″E	
RJOP		Komatsushima Heliport	Komatsushima, Tokushima	34°00′19″N 134°37′35″E	
RJOR	TTJ	Tottori Airport	Tottori, Tottori	35°31′48″N 134°09′45″E	
RJOS	TKS	Tokushima Airport (Tokushima Awaodori Airport)	Matsushige, Tokushima	34°07′58″N 134°36′24″E	
RJOT	TAK	Takamatsu Airport	Takamatsu, Kagawa	34°12′51″N 134°00′56″E	
RJOW	IWJ	Iwami Airport (Hagi-Iwami Airport)	Masuda, Shimane	34°40′35″N 131°47′25″E	
RJOY		Yao Airport	Yao, Osaka	34°35′48″N 135°36′02″E	
RJOZ		Ozuki Air Field	Shimonoseki, Yamaguchi	34°02′49″N 131°03′08″E	
RJSA	AOJ	Aomori Airport	Aomori, Aomori	40°44′00″N 140°41′19″E	
RJSC	GAJ	Yamagata Airport	Higashine, Yamagata	38°24′43″N 140°22′16″E	
RJSD	SDS	Sado Airport	Sado, Niigata	38°03′40″N 138°24′51″E	
RJSF	FKS	Fukushima Airport	Tamakawa, Fukushima	37°13′39″N 140°25′41″E	
RJSH		Hachinohe Air Base	Hachinohe, Aomori	40°33′07″N 141°28′02″E	
RJSI	HNA	Hanamaki Airport (Moriota Hanamaki Airport/Iwate-Hanamki Airport)	Hanamaki, Iwate	39°25′43″N 141°08′07″E	
RJSK	AXT	Akita Airport	Akita, Akita	39°36′56″N 140°13′07″E	
RJSM	MSJ	Misawa Airport/Misawa Air Base	Misawa, Aomori	40°42′19″N 141°22′19″E	
RJSN	KIJ	Niigata Airport	Niigata, Niigata	37°57′21″N 139°06′42″E	
RJSO		Ōminato Air Field	Mutsu, Aomori	41°13′58″N 141°07′56″E	
RJSR	ONJ	Odate-Noshiro Airport	Kitaakita, Akita	40°11′31″N 140°22′18″E	
RJSS	SDJ	Sendai Airport	Natori, Miyagi	38°08′23″N 140°55′01″E	
RJST		Matsushima Air Field	Matsushima, Miyagi	38°24′11″N 141°12′43″E	
RJSU		Kasuminome Air Field	Sendai, Miyagi	38°14′08″N 140°55′23″E	
RJSY	SYO	Shonai Airport	Sakata, Yamagata	38°48′44″N 139°47′14″E	
RJTA	NJA	NAF Atsugi	Ayase, Kanagawa	35°27′17″N 139°27′00″E	
RJTC		Tachikawa Airfield	Tachikawa, Tokyo	35°42′39″N 139°24′11″E	
RJTE		Tateyama Air Field	Tateyama, Chiba	34°59′15″N 139°49′55″E	
RJTF		Chofu Airport	Chōfu, Tokyo	35°40′18″N 139°31′41″E	
RJTH	HAC	Hachijojima Airport	Hachijō, Tokyo	33°06′54″N 139°47′09″E	
RJTI		Tokyo Heliport	Kōtō, Tokyo	35°38′10″N 139°50′22″E	
RJTJ		Iruma Air Base	Iruma, Saitama	35°50′31″N 139°24′38″E	
RJTK		Kisarazu Air Field	Kisarazu, Chiba	35°23′42″N 139°54′47″E	
RJTL		Shimofusa Air Base	Shimofusa, Chiba	35°47′56″N 140°00′44″E	
RJTO	OIM	Oshima Airport	Izu Ōshima, Tokyo	34°46′55″N 139°21′37″E	
RJTQ	MYE	Miyakejima Airport	Miyakejima, Tokyo	34°04′25″N 139°33′37″E	
RJTR		Camp Zama Kastner Army Heliport	Zama, Kanagawa	35°30′49″N 139°23′37″E	
RJTS		Soumagahara Heliport	Maebashi, Gunma	36°26′05″N 138°57′11″E	
RJTT	HND	Tokyo International Airport (Haneda)	Ōta, Tokyo	35°33′12″N 139°46′52″E	
RJTU	QUT	Utsunomiya Air Field	Utsunomiya, Tochigi	36°30′52″N 139°52′15″E	
RJTY	OKO	Yokota Air Base	Fussa, Tokyo	35°44′55″N 139°20′55″E	
ROAH	OKA	Naha Airport/Naha Air Base	Naha, Okinawa	26°11′45″N 127°38′45″E	
RODE		Ie Shima Airfield	Iejima	26°43′44″N 127°45′42″E	
RODN	DNA	Kadena Air Base	Okinawa, Okinawa	26°21′06″N 127°46′10″E	
ROIG	ISG	New Ishigaki Airport (Painushima Ishigaki Airport; formerly Ishigaki Airport)	Ishigaki, Okinawa	24°23′47″N 124°14′42″E	
ROIT		Oitakenou Airport	Bungo-ōno, Ōita	33°01′34″N 131°30′20″E	
ROKJ	UEO	Kumejima Airport	Kumejima, Okinawa	26°21′49″N 126°42′50″E	
ROKR	KJP	Kerama Airport	Zamami, Okinawa	26°10′06″N 127°17′36″E	
ROMD	MMD	Minami-Daito Airport (New Minamidaito)	Minamidaitō, Okinawa	25°50′48″N 131°15′49″E	
ROMY	MMY	Miyako Airport	Miyakojima, Okinawa	24°46′58″N 125°17′42″E	
RORA	AGJ	Aguni Airport	Aguni, Okinawa	26°35′34″N 127°14′25″E	
RORE	IEJ	Iejima Airport	Ie, Okinawa	26°43′21″N 127°47′13″E	
RORH	HTR	Hateruma Airport	Taketomi, Okinawa	24°03′30″N 123°48′14″E	
RORK	KTD	Kitadaito Airport	Kitadaito, Okinawa	25°56′41″N 131°19′37″E	
RORS	SHI	Shimojishima Airport	Miyakojima, Okinawa	24°49′36″N 125°08′41″E	
RORT	TRA	Tarama Airport	Tarama, Okinawa	24°39′14″N 124°40′31″E	
RORY	RNJ	Yoron Airport	Yoron, Kagoshima	27°02′38″N 128°24′06″E	
ROTM		Marine Corps Air Station Futenma	Ginowan, Okinawa	26°16′15″N 127°44′53″E	
ROYN	OGN	Yonaguni Airport	Yonaguni, Okinawa	24°28′03″N 122°58′47″E	

== RK - South Korea ==
Also see airport category and list.

ICAO	IATA	Airport name	Community	Coordinates	Notes
RKDD		Dokdo Heliport	(Dokdo) (Ulleung)	37°14′22″N 131°52′09″E	
RKJB	MWX	Muan International Airport	Muan	34°59′29″N 126°22′58″E	
RKJJ	KWJ	Gwangju Airport	Gwangju	35°07′35″N 126°48′32″E	
RKJK	KUV	Gunsan Airport / Kunsan Air Base	Gunsan	35°55′33″N 126°36′56″E	
RKJM	MPK	Mokpo Air Base	Yeongam County (near Mokpo)	34°45′31″N 126°22′48″E	
RKJU	CHN	Jeonju Airport	Jeonju	35°52′42″N 127°07′10″E	Military
RKJY	RSU	Yeosu Airport	Yeosu	34°50′32″N 127°37′00″E	
RKND		Sokcho Air Base	Sokcho	38°08′33″N 128°35′54″E	Civil airport closed in favour of Yangyang International Airport
RKNH		Socho-myeon Air Base	Wonju	37°26′16″N 127°57′37″E	
RKNN	KAG	Gangneung Air Base	Gangneung	37°45′12″N 128°56′37″E	
RKNW	WJU	Wonju Airport	Wonju	37°27′33″N 127°58′37″E	
RKNY	YNY	Yangyang International Airport	Yangyang County	38°03′41″N 128°40′09″E	
RKPC	CJU	Jeju International Airport	Jeju	33°30′41″N 126°29′35″E	
RKPD	JDG	Jeongseok Airport (Jungseok Airport)	Seogwipo (Jeju Province)	33°23′49″N 126°42′46″E	
RKPE	CHF	Jinhae Air Base	Jinhae	35°08′28″N 128°41′45″E	
RKPK	PUS	Gimhae International Airport	Busan	35°10′46″N 128°56′18″E	
RKPP		Busan Heliport	Busan	35°10′20″N 129°07′42″E	
RKPS	HIN	Sacheon Airport	Sacheon	35°05′19″N 128°04′13″E	
RKPU	USN	Ulsan Airport	Ulsan	35°35′36″N 129°21′06″E	
RKRA		Ganapri Airport	Yangju	37°49′50″N 126°59′23″E	Military
RKRB		Ilsin Heliport	Bupyeong, Incheon	37°28′30″N 126°44′50″E	Military
RKRC		Choil Heliport	Hanam	37°32′06″N 127°10′43″E	Military
RKRE		Yeongjong Heliport	Yeongjongdo	37°31′03″N 126°29′49″E	Military
RKRG		Songhyeon Heliport	Yangpyeong County	37°30′04″N 127°37′49″E	Military
RKRK		Hyeon-ri Airport	Gapyeong County	37°48′46″N 127°21′25″E	Military
RKRN		Icheon Airfield	Icheon	37°12′01″N 127°28′23″E	Military
RKRO		Pocheon Airfield	Pocheon	37°51′52″N 127°10′35″E	Military
RKRP		Paju Airfield	Paju	37°45′49″N 126°47′33″E	Military
RKRS	KSK	Susaek Air Base	Goyang	37°36′02″N 126°52′10″E	
RKRY		Yongin Airfield	Yongin	37°17′15″N 127°13′33″E	Military
RKSG		Camp Humphreys	Pyeongtaek	36°57′38″N 127°02′01″E	
RKSI	ICN	Incheon International Airport	Incheon (near Seoul)	37°27′48″N 126°26′24″E	
RKSM	SSN	Seoul Airbase	Seongnam	37°26′45″N 127°06′50″E	
RKSO	OSN	Osan Air Base	Osan	37°05′26″N 127°01′47″E	
RKSS	GMP	Gimpo International Airport	Seoul	37°33′29″N 126°47′26″E	
RKSW	SWU	Suwon Air Base	Suwon	37°14′19″N 127°00′25″E	
RKSX		Camp Stanley Heliport		37°43′20″N 127°05′50″E	
RKTA		Hanseo University Taean Airfield	Taean	36°35′38″N 126°17′48″E	
RKTE		Seongmu Air Base	Cheongju	36°34′05″N 127°30′00″E	
RKTG		Camp Walker Heliport	Nam District, Daegu	35°50′26″N 128°35′22″E	
RKTH	KPO	Pohang Gyeongju Airport	Pohang	35°59′16″N 129°25′13″E	
RKTI	JWO	Jungwon Air Base	Chungju	37°01′48″N 127°53′07″E	
RKTL	UJN	Uljin Airfield	Uljin	36°46′12″N 129°27′55″E	Construction suspended
RKTM		Mangilsan Heliport	Seosan	36°56′14″N 126°26′40″E	
RKTN	TAE	Daegu International Airport	Daegu	35°53′39″N 128°39′32″E	
RKTP	HMY	Seosan Air Base	Seosan	36°42′20″N 126°29′14″E	
RKTU	CJJ	Cheongju International Airport	Cheongju	36°42′59″N 127°29′57″E	
RKTY	YEC	Yecheon Air Base	Yecheon	36°37′55″N 128°21′18″E	
RKUC		Jochiwon Airfield	Jochiwon	36°34′18″N 127°17′43″E	Military
RKUK		Geumwang Airfield	Eumseong County	37°00′10″N 127°33′45″E	Military
RKUL		Songdang Army Aviation School	Nonsan	36°16′10″N 127°06′50″E	

== RP - Philippines ==
Also see airport category and list.

NOTE: Under the prevailing ICAO code assignment scheme, airports in the Luzon island group (including the Cuyo Islands, but excluding Masbate, Romblon and the rest of Palawan) and the Caluya islands of Antique are assigned RPLx and RPUx codes; those in the Visayas (except Caluya), Masbate, Romblon and Palawan (excluding Cuyo), RPVx and RPSx; and those in Mindanao, RPMx and RPNx.

ICAO	IATA	Airport name	Community	Coordinates	Notes
RPLA		Pinamalayan Airport	Pinamalayan, Oriental Mindoro	12°59′11″N 121°25′33″E	
RPLB	SFS	Subic Bay International Airport	Subic Bay Freeport Zone, Morong, Bataan	14°47′39″N 120°16′15″E	
RPLC	CRK	Clark International Airport/Clark Air Base	Clark Freeport Zone, Mabalacat, Pampanga	15°11′09″N 120°33′35″E	
RPLE		Balesin Airport (E.L. Tordesillas Airport)	Polillo, Quezon	14°25′07″N 122°02′21″E	
RPLG		Wasig Airport	Mansalay, Oriental Mindoro	12°32′02″N 121°28′55″E	Closed
RPLH	LLC	Cagayan North International Airport	Lal-lo, Cagayan	18°10′55″N 121°44′45″E	
RPLI	LAO	Laoag International Airport	Laoag, Ilocos Norte	18°10′41″N 120°31′55″E	
RPLJ		Jomalig Island Airport	Jomalig, Quezon	14°42′15″N 122°19′51″E	Formerly RPXJ
RPLK	DRP	Bicol International Airport	Daraga, Albay	13°06′44″N 123°40′38″E	
RPLL	MNL	Ninoy Aquino (Manila) International Airport/Villamor Air Base	Metro Manila	14°30′30″N 121°01′11″E	
RPLN		Palanan Airport	Palanan, Isabela	17°03′56″N 122°25′39″E	Formerly RPPA
RPLO	CYU	Cuyo Airport	Cuyo, Palawan	10°51′29″N 121°04′10″E	Formerly RPCU
RPLP	LGP	Legazpi Airport	Legazpi, Albay	13°06′44″N 123°40′38″E	Closed
RPLQ		Ernesto Rabina Air Base	Capas, Tarlac	15°19′03″N 120°25′22″E	Formerly RPXC
RPLR		Rosales Airport	Rosales, Pangasinan	15°53′06″N 120°36′16″E	
RPLS	SGL	Danilo Atienza Air Base	Cavite City, Cavite	14°29′29″N 120°53′38″E	Formerly U.S. Naval Station Sangley Point
RPLT		Itbayat Airport (Jorge Abad Airport)	Itbayat, Batanes	20°43′22″N 121°48′36″E	Formerly RPXI
RPLU	LBX	Lubang Airport	Lubang, Occidental Mindoro	13°51′21″N 120°06′21″E	Formerly RPXG
RPLV		Fort Magsaysay Airfield	Palayan, Nueva Ecija	15°26′02″N 121°05′24″E	Military, formerly RPXM
RPLW		Wallace Drone Launch Facility	San Fernando, La Union	16°37′05″N 120°17′00″E	Formerly RPXP
RPLX		Kindley Landing Field, Corregidor	Cavite City, Cavite	14°23′29″N 120°36′26″E	Formerly RPXR
RPLY		Alabat Airport	Perez, Quezon	14°13′59″N 121°55′43″E	Formerly RPXT
RPLZ		Sorsogon (Bacon) Airport	Sorsogon City, Sorsogon	13°00′26″N 124°01′34″E	Formerly RPXU
RPMA	AAV	Allah Valley Airport	Surallah, South Cotabato	06°22′04″N 124°45′09″E	Formerly RPWA
RPMB		Rajah Buayan Air Base	General Santos - Subic Bay International Airport)	06°06′20″N 125°14′06″E	Formerly RPWB; Current code formerly assigned to U.S. Naval Air Station Cubi Point
RPMC	CBO	Cotabato Airport (Awang Airport)	Datu Odin Sinsuat, Maguindanao del Norte	07°09′54″N 124°12′34″E	Formerly RPWC; Current code formerly assigned to Cebu–Lahug Airport, now closed
RPMD	DVO	Francisco Bangoy International Airport	Davao City	07°07′31″N 125°38′45″E	Formerly RPWD
RPME	BXU	Bancasi Airport (Butuan Airport)	Butuan	08°57′04″N 125°28′40″E	Formerly RPWE
RPMF	BPH	Bislig Airport	Bislig, Surigao del Sur	08°11′44″N 126°19′17″E	Formerly RPWZ
RPMG	DPL	Dipolog Airport	Dipolog, Zamboanga del Norte	08°36′06″N 123°20′33″E	Formerly RPWG
RPMH	CGM	Camiguin Airport	Mambajao, Camiguin	09°15′12″N 124°42′25″E	
RPMI	IGN	Maria Cristina Airport (Iligan Airport)	Balo-i, Lanao del Norte	08°07′50″N 124°12′53″E	Formerly RPWX
RPMJ	JOL	Jolo Airport	Jolo, Sulu	06°03′13″N 121°00′40″E	Formerly RPWJ
RPMK		Kenram Airport	Isulan, Sultan Kudarat	06°39′44″N 124°36′41″E	Formerly RPWK; Current code formerly assigned to Clark Air Base
RPML		Lumbia Airfield	Cagayan de Oro	08°24′56″N 124°36′40″E	Military, formerly RPWL; Current code formerly assigned to Laoag International Airport
RPMM	MLP	Malabang Airport	Malabang, Lanao del Sur	07°37′02″N 124°03′27″E	Formerly RPWM; Current code formerly assigned to Ninoy Aquino (Manila) International Airport
RPMN	TWT	Sanga-Sanga Airport (Tawi-Tawi Airport)	Bongao, Tawi-Tawi	05°02′49″N 119°44′34″E	Formerly RPWN
RPMO	OZC	Labo Airport (Ozamiz Airport)	Ozamiz, Misamis Occidental	08°10′43″N 123°50′29″E	Formerly RPWI
RPMP	PAG	Pagadian Airport	Pagadian, Zamboanga del Sur	07°49′38″N 123°27′30″E	Formerly RPWP; Current code formerly assigned to Legazpi Airport, now closed
RPMQ	MXI	Mati Airport	Mati, Davao Oriental	06°56′58″N 126°16′22″E	
RPMR	GES	General Santos International Airport (Tambler Airport)	General Santos	06°03′28″N 125°05′45″E	Formerly assigned to a weather station on Romblon Island
RPMS	SUG	Surigao Airport	Surigao City, Surigao del Norte	09°45′28″N 125°28′51″E	Formerly RPWS; Current code formerly assigned to U.S. Naval Station Sangley Point
RPMT		Del Monte Plantation Airstrip	Manolo Fortich, Bukidnon	08°20′52″N 124°51′01″E	Formerly RPWT; Current code formerly assigned to Mactan Air Base
RPMU		Cagayan de Sulu Airport	Mapun, Tawi-Tawi	12°32′01″N 121°28′52″E	
RPMV	IPE	Ipil Airport	Ipil, Zamboanga Sibugay	07°47′10″N 122°36′04″E	
RPMW	TDG	Tandag Airport	Tandag, Surigao del Sur	09°04′20″N 126°10′17″E	Formerly RPWW
RPMX		Liloy Airport	Liloy, Zamboanga del Norte	08°06′06″N 122°40′14″E	
RPMY	CGY	Laguindingan International Airport	Laguindingan, Misamis Oriental	08°36′43″N 124°27′21″E	Formerly assigned to Malaybalay Airport, now closed
RPMZ	ZAM	Zamboanga International Airport	Zamboanga City	06°55′20″N 122°03′35″E	
RPNO	XSO	Siocon Airport	Siocon, Zamboanga del Norte	07°42′35″N 122°09′44″E	
RPNS	IAO	Sayak Airport (Siargao Airport)	Del Carmen, Surigao del Norte	09°51′33″N 126°00′55″E	Formerly RPSI
RPSB		Bantayan Airport	Santa Fe, Cebu	11°09′43″N 123°47′06″E	
RPSD	RZP	Taytay Airport (Cesar Lim Rodriguez/Sandoval Airport)	Taytay, Palawan	11°03′06″N 119°31′06″E	
RPSG	ICO	Sicogon Airport	Carles, Iloilo	11°27′35″N 123°15′03″E	
RPSM		Panan-awan Airport (Maasin Airport)	Maasin, Southern Leyte	10°11′13″N 124°47′00″E	
RPSN		Ubay Airport	Ubay, Bohol	10°03′33″N 124°25′31″E	Formerly RPBY
RPSP	TAG	Bohol-Panglao International Airport (New Bohol International Airport)	Panglao Island, Bohol	09°33′52″N 123°45′57″E	
RPSV	SWL	San Vicente Airport	San Vicente, Palawan	10°31′30″N 119°16′26″E	
RPUA		Pamalican (Amanpulo) Airport	Agutaya, Palawan	11°21′31″N 120°43′40″E	Formerly assigned to Maura Airport in Aparri, Cagayan
RPUB	BAG	Loakan Airport	Baguio	16°22′30″N 120°37′10″E	
RPUC		Cabanatuan (Maniquis) Airfield	Cabanatuan, Nueva Ecija	15°29′11″N 121°02′30″E	Closed
RPUD	DTE	Bagasbas Airport (Daet Airport)	Daet, Camarines Norte	14°07′46″N 122°58′50″E	
RPUE		Semirara Airstrip	Caluya, Antique	12°04′29″N 121°23′19″E	Formerly assigned to Lucena Airport in Lucena
RPUF		Cesar Basa Air Base	Floridablanca, Pampanga	14°59′11″N 120°29′33″E	
RPUG		Lingayen Airport	Lingayen, Pangasinan	16°02′06″N 120°14′30″E	
RPUH	SJI	San Jose Airport	San Jose, Occidental Mindoro	12°21′41″N 121°02′48″E	
RPUI		Iba Airport	Iba, Zambales	15°19′33″N 119°58′06″E	
RPUJ		Castillejos (Jesus Magsaysay) Airfield	Castillejos, Zambales	14°56′48″N 120°11′25″E	
RPUK		Calapan Airport	Calapan, Oriental Mindoro	13°25′23″N 121°12′06″E	
RPUL		Basilio Fernando Air Base	Lipa, Batangas	13°57′17″N 121°07′29″E	
RPUM	MBO	Mamburao Airport	Mamburao, Occidental Mindoro	13°12′32″N 120°36′18″E	
RPUN	WNP	Naga Airport	Pili, Camarines Sur	13°35′05″N 123°16′12″E	
RPUO	BSO	Basco Airport	Basco, Batanes	20°27′05″N 121°58′47″E	
RPUP		Jose Panganiban (Larap) Airport	Jose Panganiban, Camarines Norte	14°17′28″N 122°38′46″E	
RPUQ		Mindoro Airport (Vigan Airport)	Vigan, Ilocos Sur	17°33′17″N 120°21′22″E	
RPUR	BQA	Baler Airport (Dr. Juan C. Angara Airport)	Baler, Aurora	15°43′49″N 121°30′06″E	
RPUS	SFE	San Fernando Airport	San Fernando, La Union	16°35′41″N 120°18′13″E	
RPUT	TUG	Tuguegarao Airport	Tuguegarao, Cagayan	17°38′18″N 121°43′50″E	
RPUU		Bulan Airport	Bulan, Sorsogon	12°41′02″N 123°52′38″E	
RPUV	VRC	Virac Airport	Virac, Catanduanes	13°34′35″N 124°12′20″E	
RPUW	MRQ	Marinduque Airport	Gasan, Marinduque	13°21′36″N 121°49′31″E	
RPUX		Plaridel Airport	Plaridel, Bulacan	14°53′26″N 120°51′10″E	
RPUY	CYZ	Cauayan Airport	Cauayan, Isabela	16°55′47″N 121°45′11″E	
RPUZ		Bagabag Airport	Bagabag, Nueva Vizcaya	16°37′09″N 121°15′08″E	
RPVA	TAC	Tacloban City Airport (Daniel Z. Romualdez Airport)	Tacloban	11°13′39″N 125°01′40″E	
RPVB	BCD	Bacolod–Silay International Airport	Silay, Negros Occidental	10°46′35″N 123°00′55″E	
RPVC	CYP	Calbayog Airport	Calbayog, Samar	12°04′22″N 124°32′42″E	
RPVD	DGT	Dumaguete-Sibulan Airport	Sibulan, Negros Oriental	09°20′01″N 123°18′02″E	
RPVE	MPH	Caticlan Airport (Godofredo P. Ramos/Boracay Airport)	Malay, Aklan	11°55′29″N 121°57′18″E	
RPVF	CRM	Catarman National Airport	Catarman, Northern Samar	12°30′09″N 124°38′09″E	
RPVG		Guiuan Airport	Guiuan, Eastern Samar	11°02′07″N 125°44′29″E	
RPVH	HIL	Hilongos Airport	Hilongos, Leyte	10°22′36″N 124°45′40″E	
RPVI	ILO	Iloilo International Airport (Cabatuan Airport)	Cabatuan, Iloilo	10°49′58″N 122°29′36″E	
RPVJ	MBT	Moises R. Espinosa Airport (Masbate Airport)	Masbate City, Masbate	12°22′10″N 123°37′45″E	
RPVK	KLO	Kalibo International Airport	Kalibo, Aklan	11°40′45″N 122°22′33″E	
RPVL		Del Pilar Airport	Roxas, Palawan	10°20′07″N 119°21′16″E	Formerly assigned to Wasig Airport
RPVM	CEB	Mactan–Cebu International Airport	Lapu-Lapu	10°18′26″N 123°58′44″E	
RPVN		Medellin Airfield	Medellin, Cebu	11°08′26″N 123°57′35″E	Closed
RPVO	OMC	Ormoc Airport	Ormoc	11°03′22″N 124°33′56″E	
RPVP	PPS	Puerto Princesa International Airport	Puerto Princesa	09°44′31″N 118°45′32″E	
RPVQ		Biliran Airport	Naval, Biliran	11°30′55″N 124°25′47″E	Formerly RPNA
RPVR	RXS	Roxas Airport	Roxas, Capiz	11°35′51″N 122°45′06″E	
RPVS	EUQ	Antique Airport (Evelio Javier/San Jose Airport)	San Jose de Buenavista, Antique	10°45′57″N 121°56′00″E	
RPVT	TAG	Tagbilaran Airport	Tagbilaran, Bohol	09°39′50″N 123°51′11″E	Closed
RPVU	TBH	Tugdan Airport	Alcantara, Romblon	12°18′39″N 122°04′46″E	
RPVV	USU	Busuanga–Coron Airport (Francisco B. Reyes Airport)	Coron, Palawan	12°07′17″N 120°06′00″E	
RPVW	BPA	Borongan Airport	Borongan, Eastern Samar	11°40′27″N 125°28′43″E	
RPVX		Dolores Airport (Picardo Airport)	Dolores, Eastern Samar	12°02′16″N 125°29′25″E	Closed
RPVY		Catbalogan Airport	Catbalogan, Samar	11°48′36″N 124°49′48″E	
RPVZ		Siquijor Airport	Siquijor, Siquijor	09°12′38″N 123°28′09″E	
RPWV		Buenavista Airfield	Buenavista	08°56′32″N 125°23′50″E	Closed
