= MYE =

MYE, Mye or mye may refer to:

- Miyakejima Airport, Japan (IATA code MYE)
- Myene language, spoken in Gabon (ISO639 code mye)
- Mye, a song in the album Wiretap Scars by Sparta
