= OKJ =

OKJ may refer to:

- OKJ (karting), a kart-racing class
- Oakland – Jack London Square station, Oakland, California, US (Amtrak station code)
- Okayama Airport, Okayama, Japan (IATA code)
