= Ryūgasaki Airfield =

Ryūgasaki Airfield 竜ヶ崎飛行場
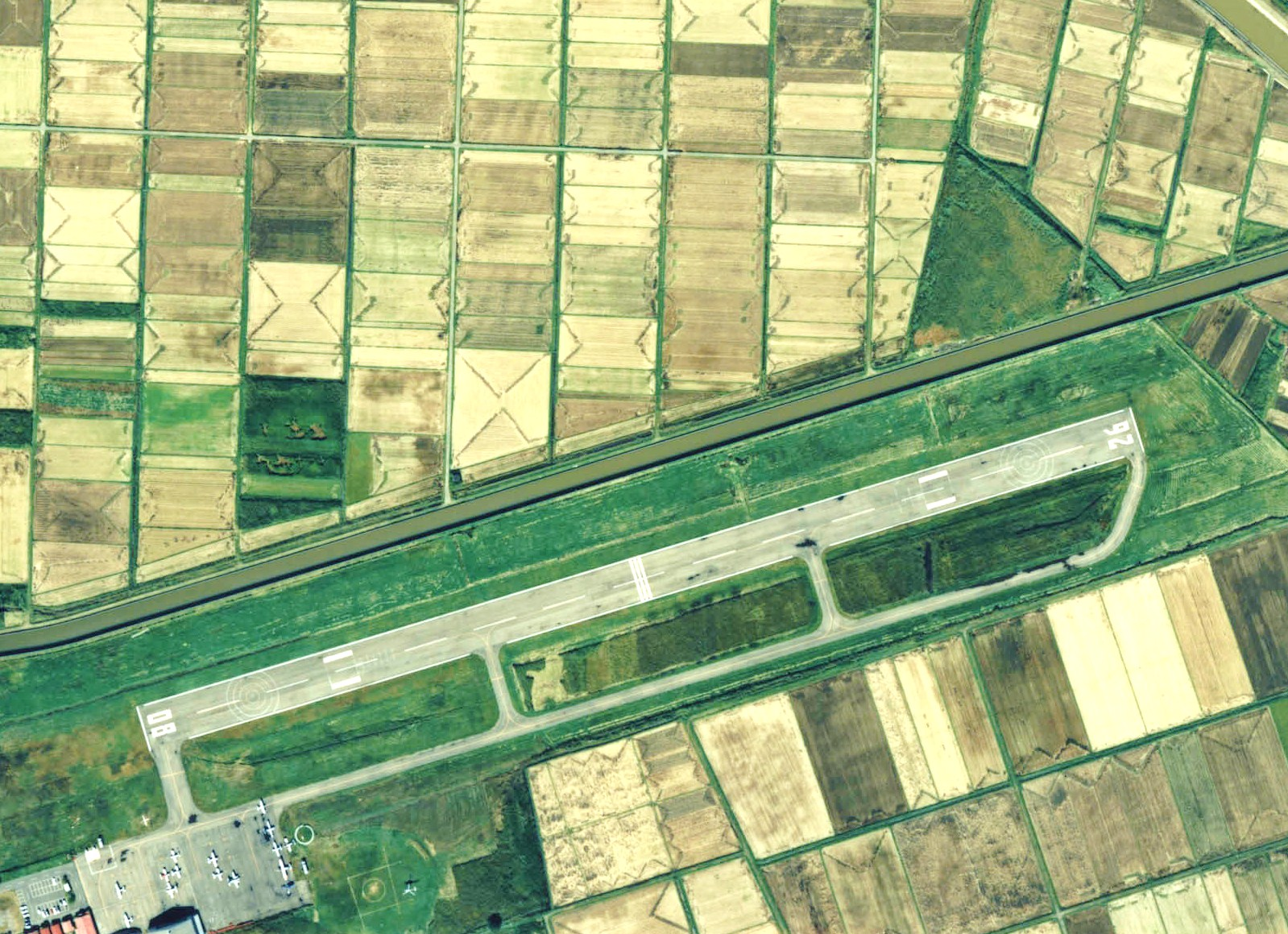
- IATA: none; ICAO: RJA3

Summary
- Airport type: Private
- Owner: New Central Airservice
- Serves: Ryūgasaki, Ibaraki
- Location: Japan
- Elevation AMSL: 8 ft / 2.5 m
- Coordinates: 35°54′23″N 140°14′32″E

Map
- Location in Japan Ryūgasaki Airfield (Japan)

Runways
Direction	Length		Surface
Direction	m	ft	Surface
08/26	800	2,625	Asphalt concrete

Statistics (1969)
- Aircraft movement: none

Ryūgasaki Airfield (竜ヶ崎飛行場, Ryūgasaki Hikōjō) is a privately owned airfield in the city Ryūgasaki, Ibaraki, Japan.

The airport was opened on November 11, 1969, as a private venture by Nissho Iwai. Although there are no scheduled flights, it is a base for light aircraft and pilot training. Due to its proximity to Narita International Airport, the airspace around the airport is under traffic control by Narita, and there are certain restrictions on operations. The runway is also used as a drag racing course.

The airport contains the headquarters of New Central Airservice.
