= Chōfu Airport =

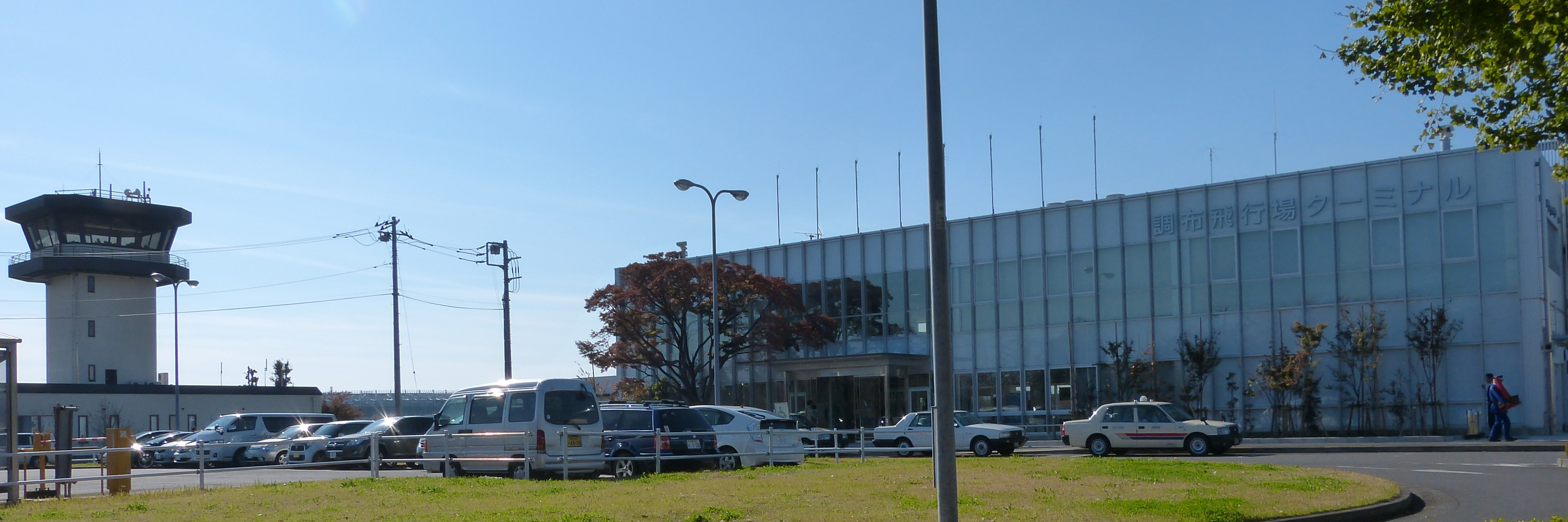
- IATA: none; ICAO: RJTF

Summary
- Airport type: Public
- Operator: Bureau of Port and Harbor, Tokyo Metropolitan Government
- Serves: Greater Tokyo Area
- Location: Chōfu, Tokyo, Japan
- Hub for: New Central Airservice
- Elevation AMSL: 139 ft (42 m)
- Coordinates: 35°40′18″N 139°31′41″E

Map
- Location within Tokyo Location within Japan

Runways
Direction	Length		Surface
Direction	m	ft	Surface
17/35	800	2,625	Asphalt concrete

Statistics (2015)
- Passengers: 94,816
- Cargo (metric tonnes): 55
- Aircraft movement: 15,225
- Source: Japanese Ministry of Land, Infrastructure, Transport and Tourism

Chōfu Airport (調布飛行場, Chōfu Hikōjō) (ICAO: RJTF) is an airport located 1.2 NM (2.2 km; 1.4 mi) northwest of Chōfu, Tokyo, Japan, west of central Tokyo. It is administered by the Bureau of Port and Harbor of the Tokyo Metropolitan Government. The airport's main commercial activity is New Central Airservice commuter flights to the Izu Islands south of Tokyo.

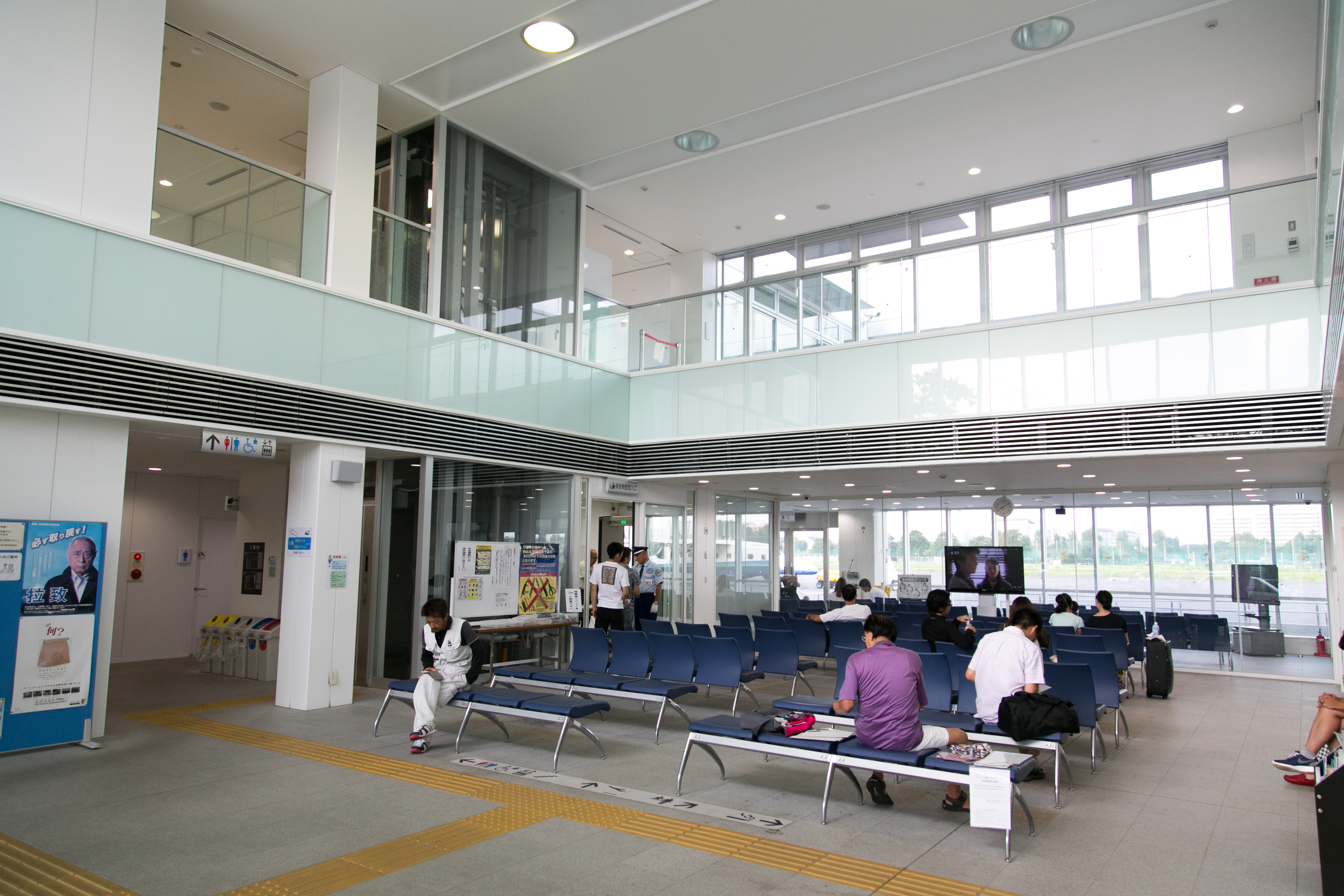
Passenger terminal at Chōfu Airport

== History ==
Plans for Chōfu airfield were made in 1938. Construction started in 1939 and the airport opened in 1941. It had two runways, one of 1000 meters and one of 675 meters. Although it was originally envisioned as a public airport, with the onset of World War II it was exclusively used by the Imperial Japanese Army Air Service. The airfield was host to Kawasaki Ki-61 Hien fighters used for air defense against Boeing B-29 Superfortress bombing raids by the United States Army Air Forces (USAAF).

In 1944 a number of concrete hangars were built to protect the aircraft from air attacks. Two of these are preserved in what is now a small park to the east of the current airport.

Occupied after the war by American forces, the airfield was briefly used as a base for Lockheed F-5 Lightning photo-reconnaissance aircraft of the 6th and 71st Reconnaissance Groups beginning in late September 1945, mapping the extent of wartime damage over Honshū. The mapping flights ended in January 1946, ending operational military use by the Americans. The USAAF saw no need for the facility, especially given its proximity to the densely populated urban area. It was turned over to the occupation government in 1946.

Chofu Airfield was returned to the Japanese government in 1972 as part of the Kanto Plain Consolidation Plan, under which several US military facilities in the Greater Tokyo Area were returned to Japan in exchange for upgrades to Yokota Air Base in western Tokyo. The nearby Kanto Mura military housing complex was returned to Japan in 1974. Public commercial air service began in 1979 with flights to Niijima.

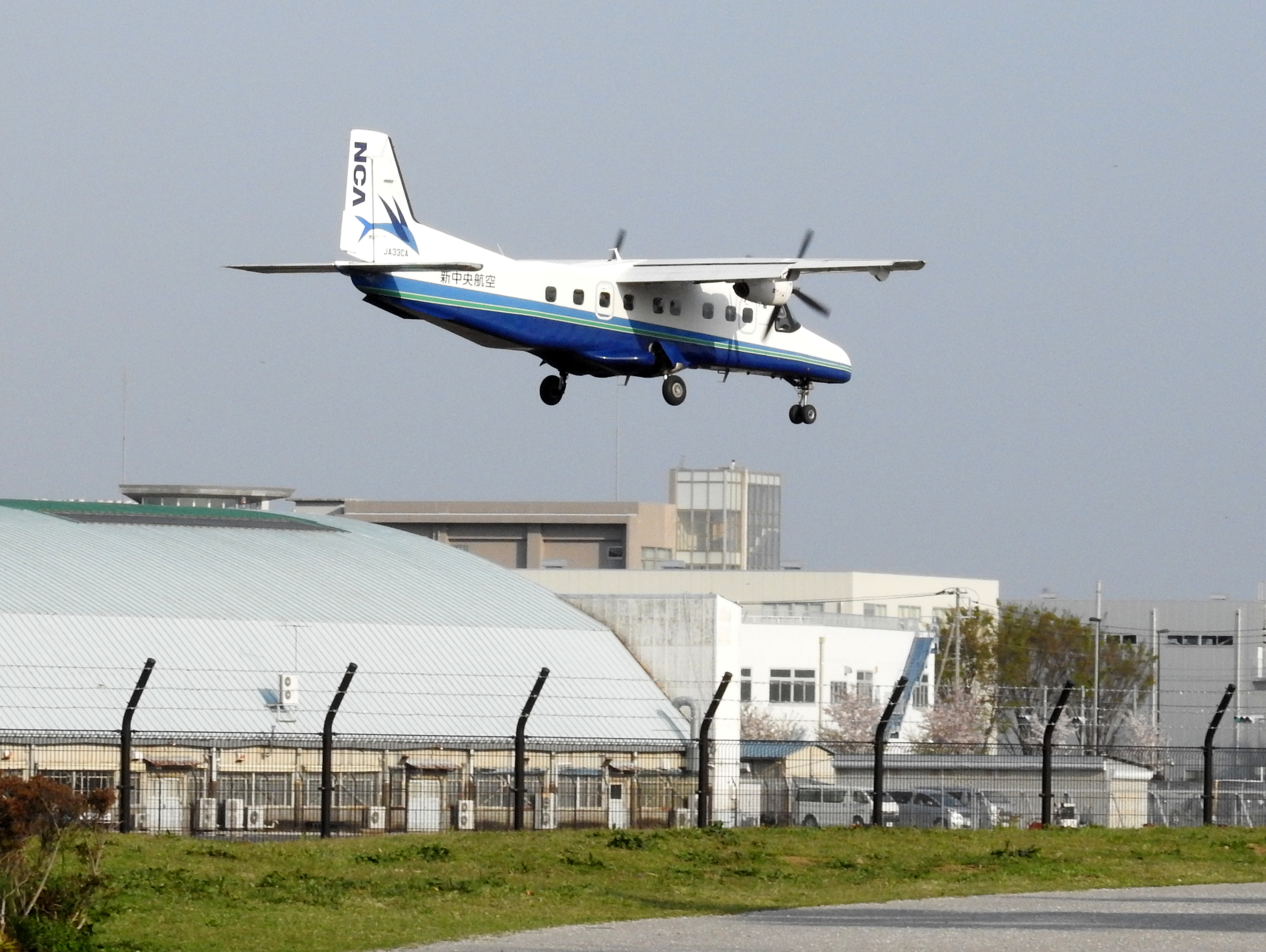
Dornier 228 JA33CA operated by New Central Air Service

== Current users ==
Chōfu Airport is currently used by a number of companies including Aerotec, Jamco, Toho Air Service, Tokyo Airlines and New Central Airservice.

The airport is also used by the national aeronautics and astronautics agency JAXA. JAXA's headquarters are also located in Chōfu. The Chōfu Aerospace Center serves as JAXA's primary research and development base. As a hub of aeronautical research and development in Japan, the center plays an important role in supporting and spearheading the growth of the Japanese aviation industry.

As with most Japanese airports, Chōfu Airport has an observation deck which is located on the second floor of its terminal. In addition, there is a platform and a number of mounds located in nearby parks that also allow for the observation of Chōfu Airport.

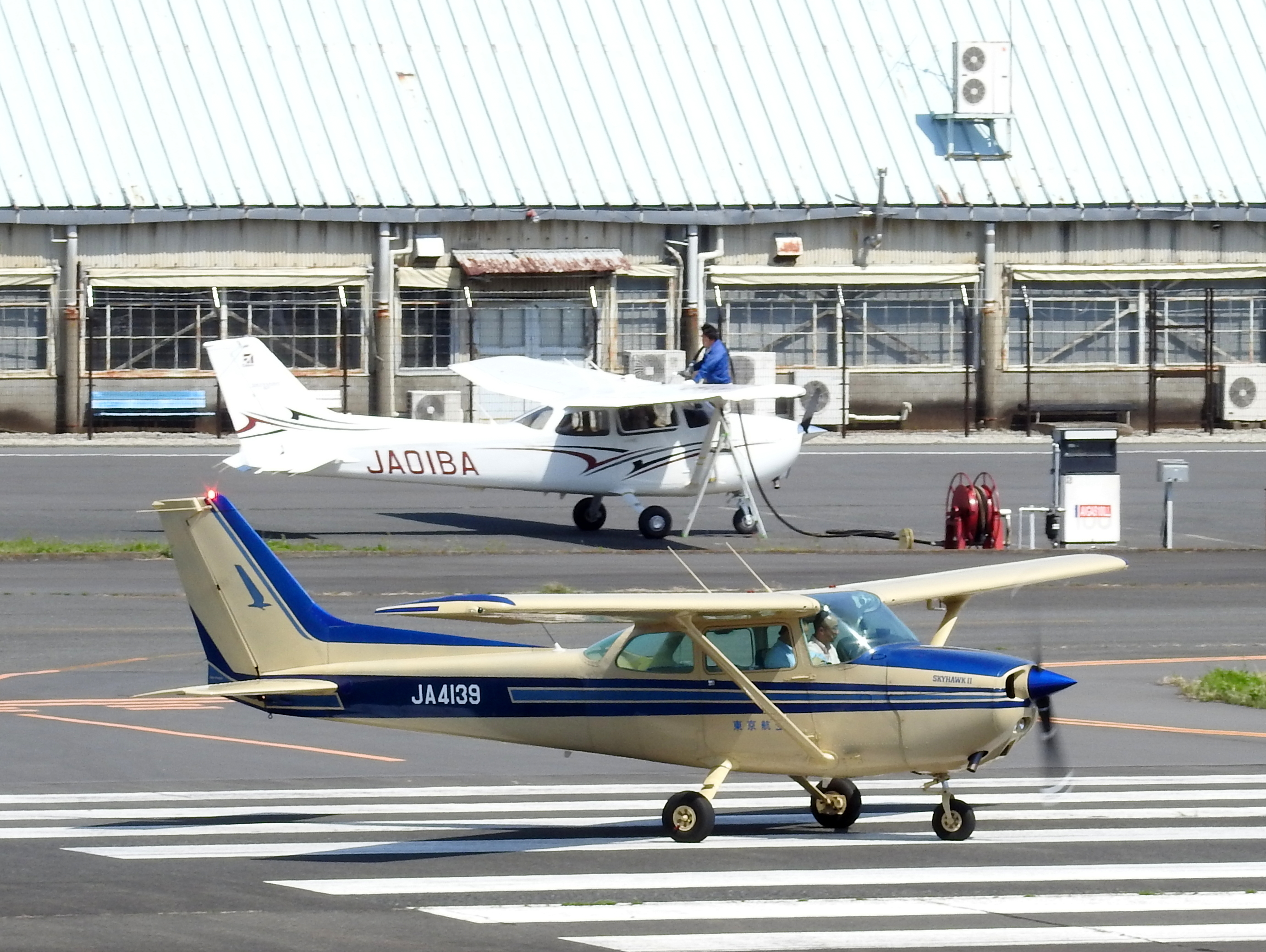
Cessna 172 Skyhawk II JA4139

== Airlines and destinations ==
Airlines	Destinations
New Central Airservice	Kōzushima, Miyakejima, Niijima, Oshima

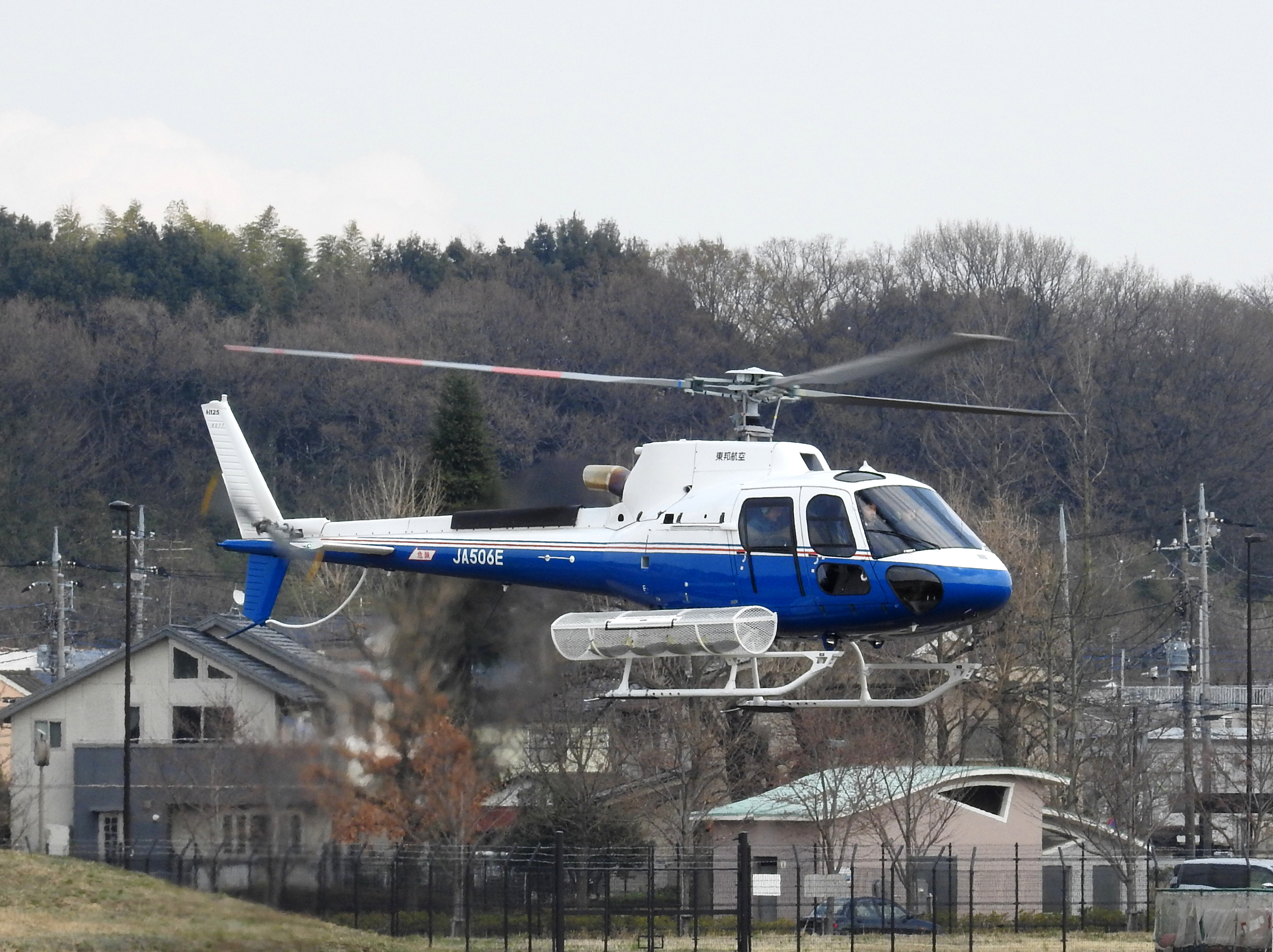
Eurocopter AS350 Écureuil JA506E operated by Toho Air Service

== Access ==
Please get off Chōfu Hikōjō bus stop in front of the airport terminal.

Chōfu Hikōjō

No	Via	Destination	Company	Note
調40	University of Electro-Communications	Chōfu Station (Tokyo)	Odakyu Bus	1～2/1h
調32	Fuji-Jūkō mae (International Christian University)	Musashi-Sakai Station	Odakyu Bus	Runs only in the midnight and one service
鷹51	Fuji-Jūkō mae (International Christian University)	Mitaka Station	Odakyu Bus	Runs only in the morning and three service
鷹58	Fuji-Jūkō mae (International Christian University)	Mitaka Station	Odakyu Bus	Runs only in the afternoon and two service
Mitaka City Bus	Kyorin University Hospital	Mitakadai Station	Odakyu Bus	one service/1h, There is connecting discount that go via Mitakadai Station to Mitaka Station

Besides, passengers who go Chofu Airport also can get off Osawa Community Center Bus stop．It takes about ten minutes from this bus stop to Chofu airport by foot．

Osawa Community Center

No	Via	Destination	Company	Note
境91	Chōfu Station・Kokuryō Station	Komae Station	Odakyu Bus	
境91	Fuji-Jūkō mae (International Christian University)	Musashi-Sakai Station	Odakyu Bus	
武91	Tama Cemetery	Musashi-Koganei Station	Keio Bus	
武91	Kamiishihara (Nishi-Chofu Station)	Chōfu Station (Tokyo)	Keio Bus	

== Accidents and incidents ==
On March 23, 1976, Mitsuyasu Maeno, a young right-wing nationalist and actor, took off from Chōfu Airport on a self-inspired kamikaze mission into the house of Yoshio Kodama, a Japanese organized crime figure linked to the Lockheed Scandal. Maeno felt that Kodama facilitating bribes from the American aircraft company was a betrayal of right-wing values. Maeno was killed and two of Kodama's servants were injured. Kodama was uninjured.

On August 10, 1980, a private plane crashed into the playground of Chōfu Junior High School after take-off, killing everyone on board.

On July 26, 2015, a Piper PA-46 Malibu piloted by Taishi Kawamura and carrying four passengers on board, crashed into a residential area just after take-off. Three people died in the crash, including the pilot, one of the passengers, and a woman on the ground. The other three passengers survived with injuries, as did two people on the ground. Witnesses on the ground reported that the engine made an abnormal sound as it flew over them. Several videos were uploaded to YouTube showing the airplane flying lower than usual after take-off. Three investigators from the Japan Transport Safety Board were soon dispatched to the accident site. The Tokyo Metropolitan Police Department also launched an investigation, suspecting professional negligence resulting in injury and death. Initial investigative work revealed the airplane was involved in a landing incident at an airport in Hokkaido in October 2004. Several anomalies with the flight plan were also found. Media speculations suggested the engine or professional negligence as likely causes of the crash.

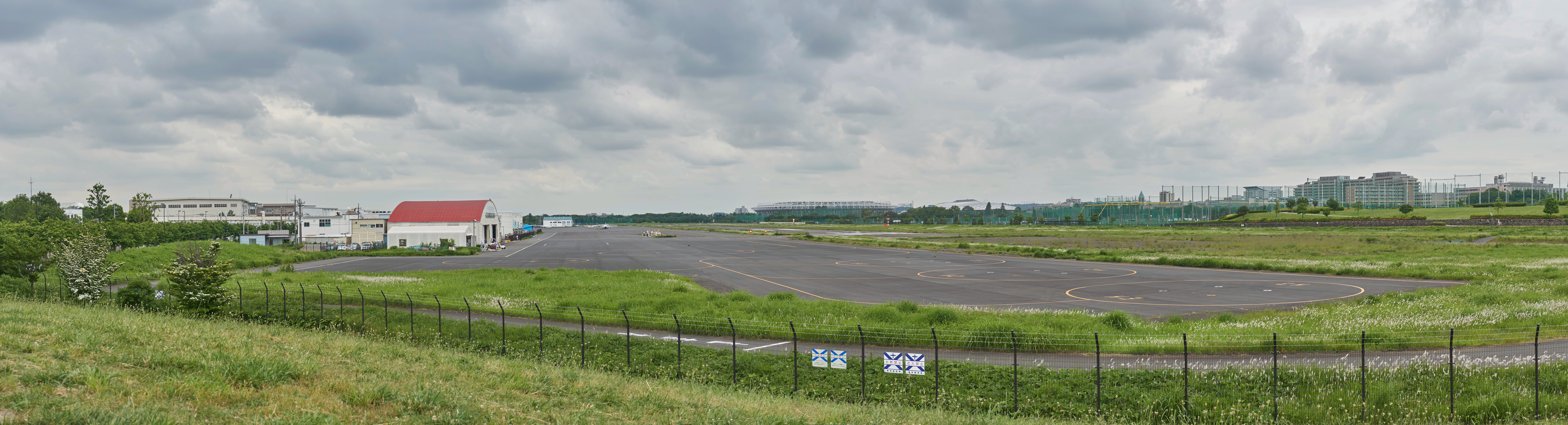
Airfield as seen from the north
