= Oshima Airport =

Ōshima Airport 大島空港
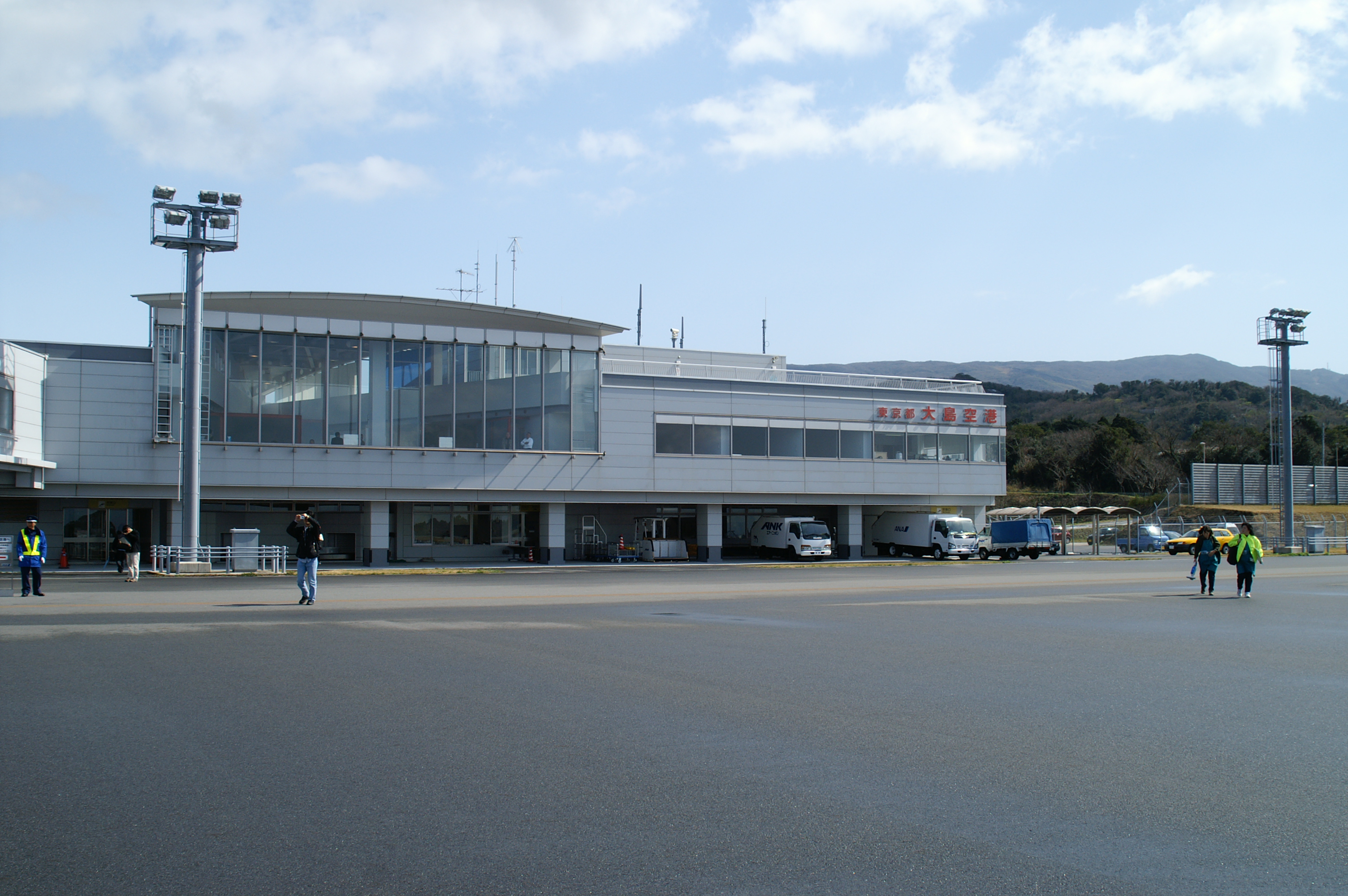
- IATA: OIM; ICAO: RJTO

Summary
- Airport type: Public (Type-3)
- Operator: Tokyo Metropolis
- Serves: Izu Ōshima Town
- Location: Izu Ōshima, Tokyo
- Elevation AMSL: 124 ft / 38 m
- Coordinates: 34°46′55″N 139°21′37″E

Map
- Location in Japan

Runways
Direction	Length		Surface
Direction	m	ft	Surface
03/21	1,800	5,906	Asphalt

Statistics (2015)
- Passengers: 37,942
- Cargo (metric tonnes): 21
- Aircraft movement: 5,830
- Source: Japanese Ministry of Land, Infrastructure, Transport and Tourism

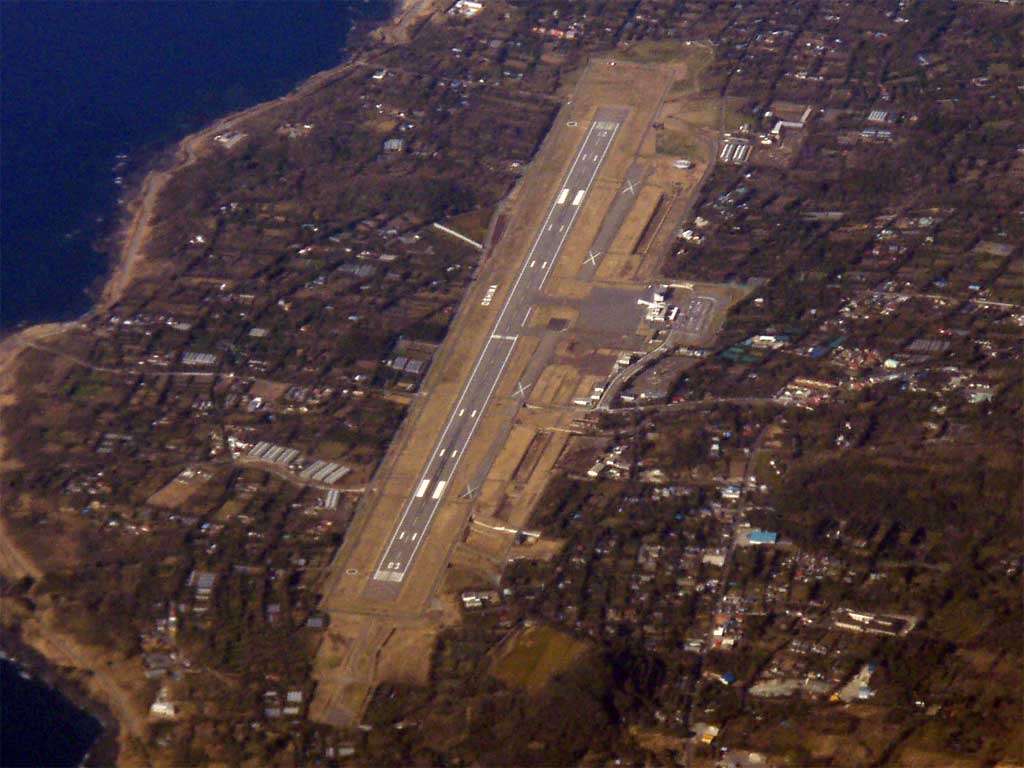
Aerial view of Ōshima Airport

Ōshima Airport (大島空港, Ōshima Kūkō), also known as Tokyo Ōshima Camellia Airport (東京大島かめりあ空港, Tokyo Ōshima Kameria Kūkō), is located on the island of Izu Ōshima, Tokyo, Japan (IATA: OIM, ICAO: RJTO).

== History ==
Ōshima Airport was built in June 1964, with a 1,200 metres (3,900 ft) runway. The runway was lengthened to its present 1,800 metres (5,900 ft) length in October 2002 to permit operations by jet-powered aircraft. From August 2008, All Nippon Airways (ANA) began daily services to Haneda Airport in Tokyo. New Central Airservice began operations to Chofu Airport from 2009. ANA ended service to Ōshima in October 2015. Since 9 July 2021, Ōshima Airport has been called Tokyo Oshima Camellia Airport (東京大島カメリア空港, Tōkyō Ōshima Kacmeria Kūkō) as nickname.

== Airlines and destinations ==
Airlines	Destinations
New Central Airservice	Chōfu
Toho Air Service	Miyakejima, Toshima

Prior to 2015, ANA Wings operated a daily service to Haneda Airport. Sometimes Fuji Dream Airlines operate a charter service to Sendai Airport.

== Facilities ==
Ōshima Airport is operated by the Tokyo Metropolitan Government. The terminal is open from 8:30 a.m. to 4:30 p.m. daily and contains a restaurant, shop and observation deck. The Japan Civil Aviation Bureau and Japan Meteorological Agency maintain offices on-site.

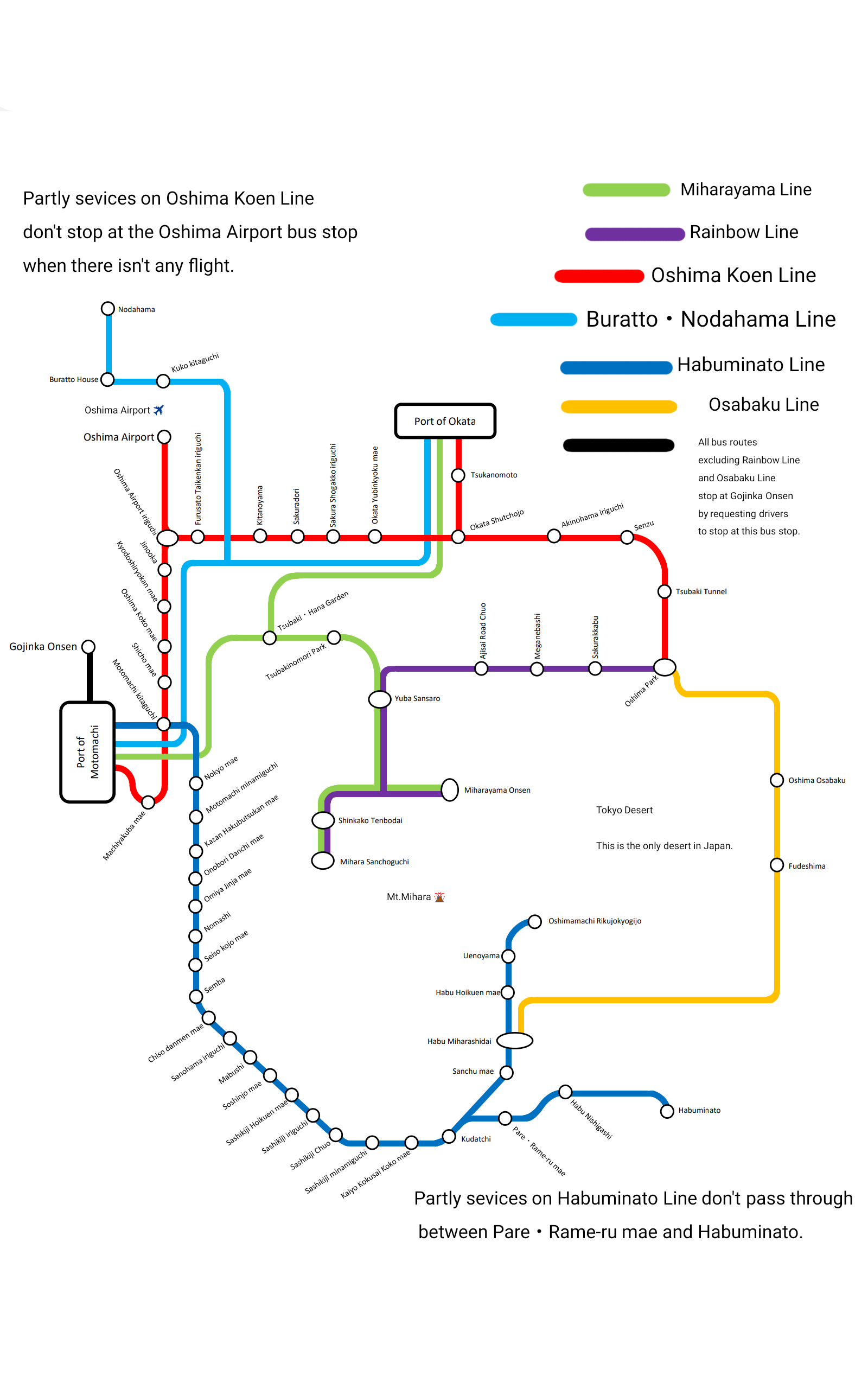
Routemap and bus stops of Ōshima Bus
