= New Central Airservice =

Regional airline of Japan

New Central Airservice Corporation 新中央航空株式会社 Shin Chūō Kōkū Kabushiki-gaisha
IATA	ICAO	Call sign
—	—	CHUOH AIR
- Founded: December 15, 1978; 47 years ago
- Operating bases: Chōfu Airport (Tōkyō)
- Fleet size: 5
- Destinations: 5
- Headquarters: Ryūgasaki Airfield; Ryūgasaki, Ibaraki Prefecture, Japan
- Key people: Hiroshi Nagahama (CEO)
- Website: www.central-air.co.jp

New Central Airservice is an airline with its headquarters on the grounds of Ryūgasaki Airfield in Ryūgasaki, Ibaraki Prefecture, Japan. It operates domestic services and its main base is Chōfu Airport, Tokyo.

== Destinations ==
The airline operates flights from Chōfu Airport, in Tokyo, to the following destinations within Japan islands (as of June 2014):

^{[Base]}	Base

City	Airport
Chōfu	Chōfu Airport ^{[Base]}
Izu Ōshima	Oshima Airport
Kōzushima	Kōzushima Airport
Miyakejima	Miyakejima Airport
Niijima	Niijima Airport

== Fleet ==
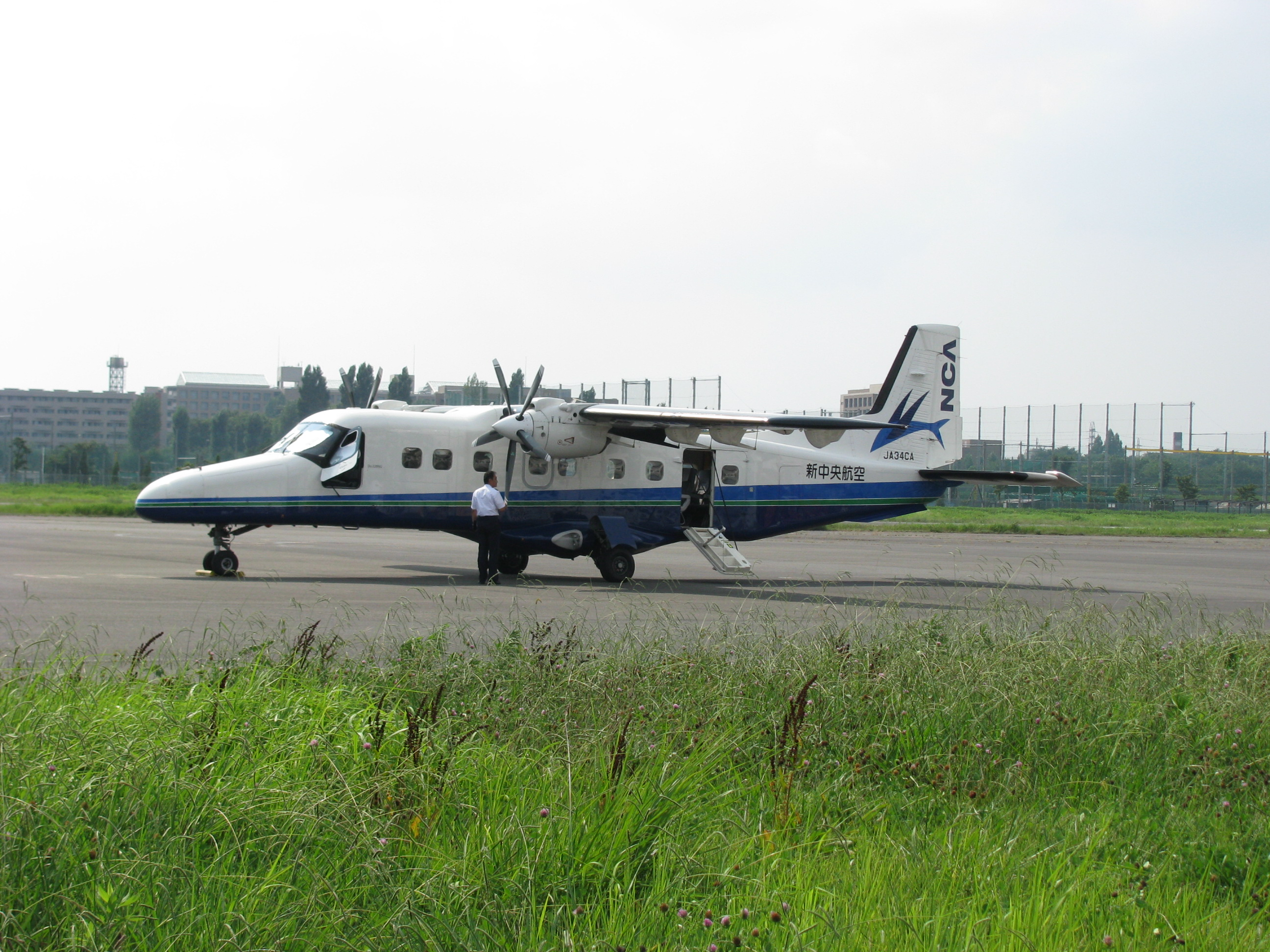
New Central Airlines' Dornier 228 at Chōfu Airport

As of July 2026, New Central Airservice operates the following aircraft:

New Central Airservice Fleet
Aircraft	In Fleet	Order	Passengers	notes
Dornier 228-212	5	-	19	Three next generation.

=== Former fleet ===
As of June 2025, New Central Airservice operated 6 Dornier 228.

New Central Airservice has also operated the following aircraft, which have since been retired:

New Central Airservice Former Fleet
Aircraft	In Fleet
Britten-Norman BN2B-20 Islander	2
