= Ojika Airport =

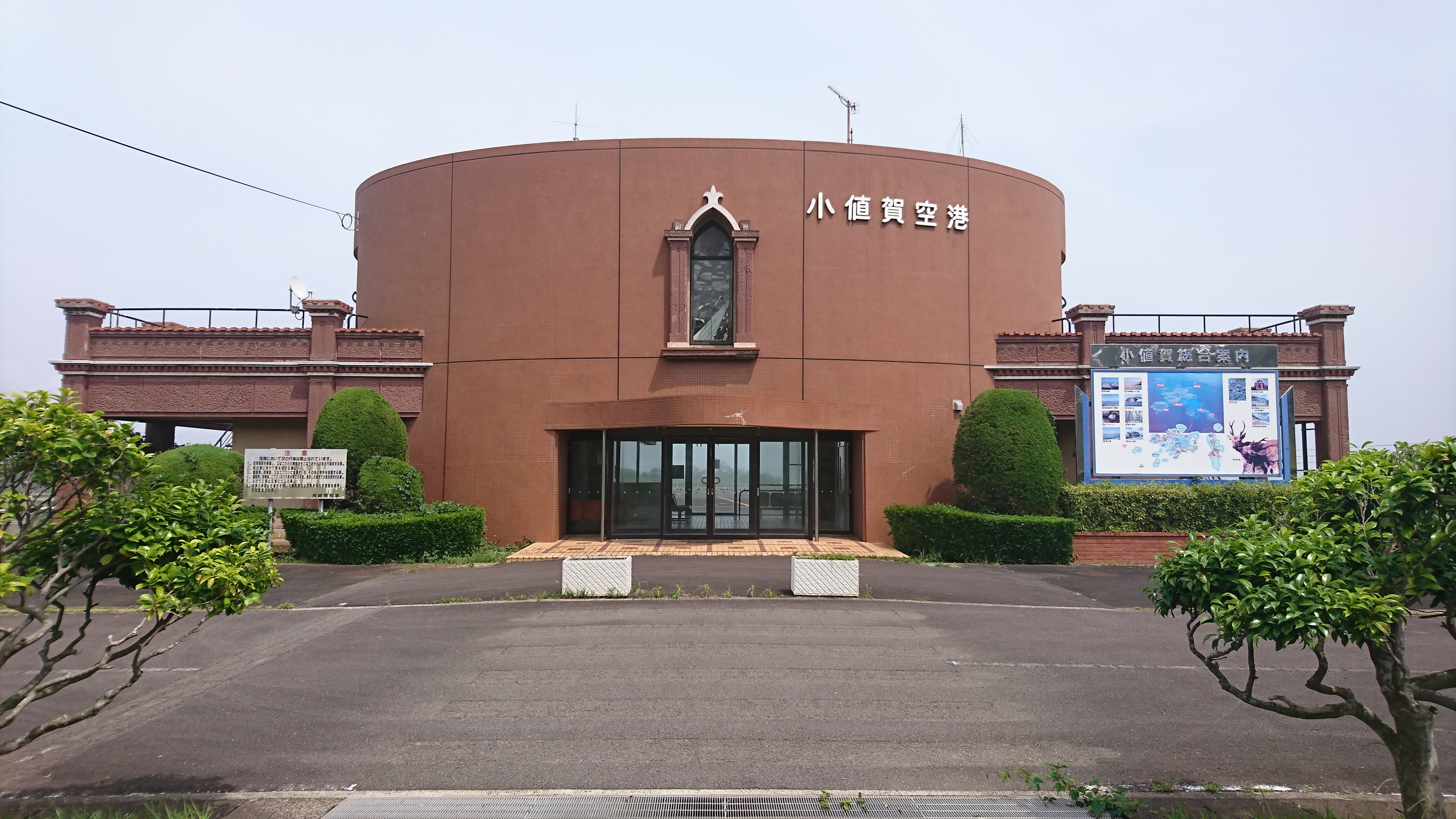
- IATA: none; ICAO: RJDO

Summary
- Airport type: Public
- Operator: Nagasaki Prefecture
- Location: Ojika, Japan
- Elevation AMSL: 25 ft (7.6 m)
- Coordinates: 33°11′27″N 129°05′25″E

Map
- Location within Nagasaki Prefecture Location within Japan

Runways
Direction	Length		Surface
Direction	m	ft	Surface
03/21	800	2,625	Asphalt concrete

Statistics (2015)
- Passengers: 0
- Cargo (metric tonnes): 0
- Aircraft movement: 327
- Source: Japanese Ministry of Land, Infrastructure, Transport and Tourism

Ojika Airport (ICAO: RJDO) is a public aerodrome, located about 3.0 km (1.9 mi) southeast of the town office in Ojika, Nagasaki Prefecture, Japan.

== History ==
The STOL (short take-off and landing) airport opened on 20 December 1985 on land reclaimed from the coastal strip at the island's southeasterly tip. Nagasaki Airways, rebranded as Oriental Air Bridge after March 2001, operated passenger services to two airports on Kyushu using BN2 light prop-planes. Flights to Fukuoka Airport were dropped in March 2004.

The last regular connection, to Nagasaki Airport, saw only a few passengers carried during 2005 and ended in March 2006. Since then, the airport remains in operation but only for private planes and for transporting emergency patients by helicopter. In 2018 just over 150 landings were reported mainly helicopters. Nagasaki Prefecture has discussed abolishing the airport and simply maintaining the runway in case of need for disaster relief.
