= Oitakenou Airport =

Oitakenou Airport 大分県央飛行場
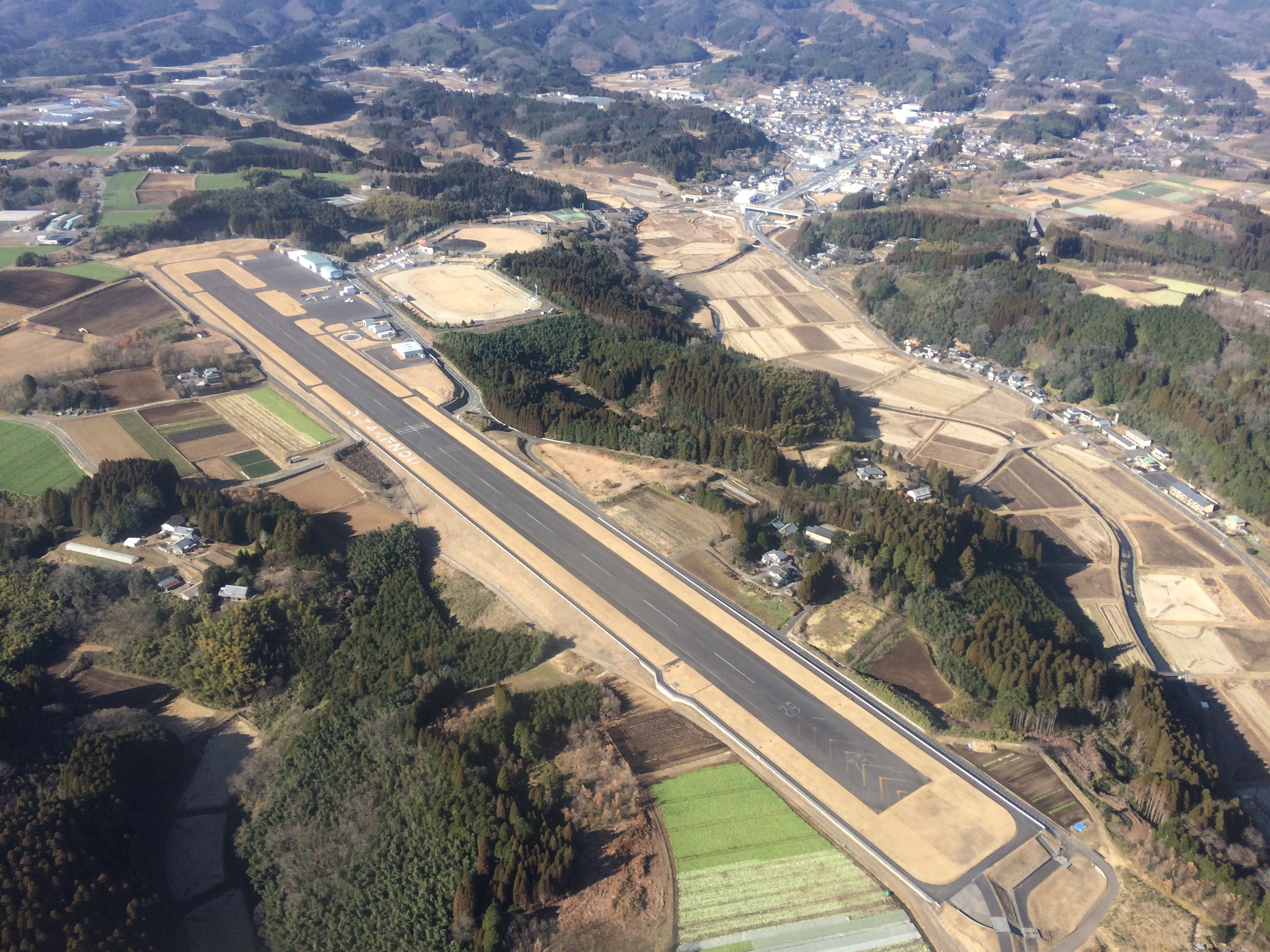
- IATA: N/A; ICAO: N/A

Summary
- Operator: Oita Prefecture
- Location: Bungo-ōno, Ōita, Japan
- Elevation AMSL: 771 ft / 235 m
- Coordinates: 33°01′34″N 131°30′20″E

Map
- Location in Japan Oitakenou Airport (Japan)

Runways
Direction	Length		Surface
Direction	m	ft	Surface
11/29	800	2,625	Asphalt/concrete
- Source: Japanese AIP at AIS Japan

Oitakenou Airport (大分県央飛行場, Ōita-ken'ō Hikōjō), (IATA: N/A, ICAO: N/A) is about 13 NM (24 km; 15 mi) from Ōita Station located in Bungo-ōno City within Ōita Prefecture, Japan. It is also referred to as Oitakenou Airfield and is classified as a General or Other Airport within Japan.

== History ==
The airport opened in April 1992 and originally served as a means to transport agricultural products, produce, and crops by air from Ōita Prefecture. In 1997, the airport's name was changed to its current name, Oitakenou Airport, as the airport began to serve civil aviation functions.

== Current activity ==
Oitakenou Airport currently services arrivals and departures of civil aviation (with prior notice and approval), sightseeing flights, and offers use of runway and hangar facilities for private pilots. In addition, the airport supports rescue and firefighting efforts throughout Kyushu island a Kawasaki BK 117 firefighting helicopter, called "Toyokaze", is stationed there.

Kyushu Airlines offers private chartered flights or sightseeing flights out of Oitakenou Airport.

In 2003, Nippon Bunri University (NBU) established the Oitakenou Airport NBU Extension Campus. The facility is used for NBU Aerospace Engineering Department students to gain practical knowledge and learn about the mechanics and engineering of airplane engines.

The Kenou Flying Club, founded in February 2004, operates out of the Oitakenou Airport. They utilize Cessna 172P or 172R airframes and conduct cross-country flights as well as offering orientation and training flights.

== Facilities ==
The apron can support three commuter planes, six small planes (similar in size to Cessna 172), and one firefighting helicopter. There is one passenger terminal, a 290 square meter hangar, and a 500 square meter parking lot.
