= Kōnan Airport =

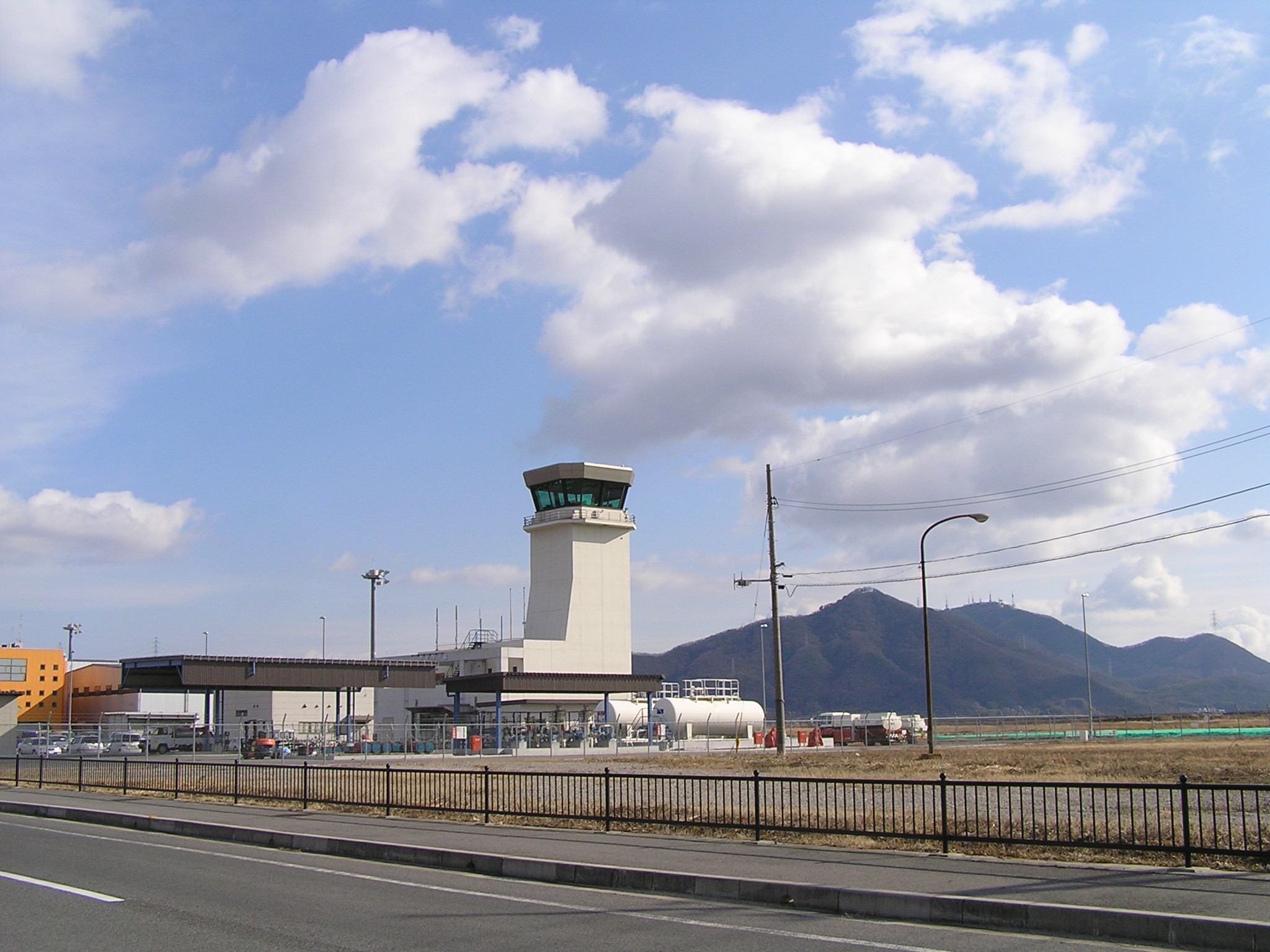
- IATA: none; ICAO: RJBK

Summary
- Airport type: Public
- Operator: Okayama Prefecture
- Location: Minami-ku, Okayama, Okayama Prefecture, Japan
- Opened: October 13, 1962
- Elevation AMSL: 0 ft / 0 m
- Coordinates: 34°35′29″N 133°56′00″E

Map
- Location in Japan RJBK (Japan)

Runways
Direction	Length		Surface
Direction	m	ft	Surface
09/27	1,200	3,937	Asphalt
- Source: Japanese AIP at AIS Japan

Kōnan Airport (岡南飛行場, Kōnan Hikōjō) (ICAO: RJBK) is a public aerodrome located about eight kilometres (5.0 mi) south of Okayama Station in Minami-ku, Okayama, Japan.

== History ==
The airport opened on October 13, 1962, as Okayama Airport. It had scheduled service by All Nippon Airways (Tokyo Haneda) and Toa Domestic Airlines (Matsuyama and Miyazaki); however, the runway was too short to accommodate jet service, and the largest aircraft that could reliably use the airport was the NAMC YS-11.

On March 11, 1988, concurrently with the opening of new Okayama Airport, Konan became an airport exclusively for small planes under the present name.

A ten-seat Cessna jet overshot the runway at the airport on June 10, 2015, landing in a nearby lake.

== Ground transportation ==
=== Bus ===
No	Via	Destination	Company	Note
41	Urayasuguchi・Japan Red Cross Okayama Hospital・Okayama University Hospital・Okayama City Hall	Okayama Station	Okaden Bus	
62	Urayasuguchi・Seikibashi Station・Higashi-chūōchō Station・Daiunji-mae Station・Shin-Saidaijichōsuji Station・Tenmanya Bus Terminal・Yanagawa Station (Okayama)・Nishigawa-ryokudōkōen Station	Okayama Station	Okaden Bus	
