= Kōzushima Airport =

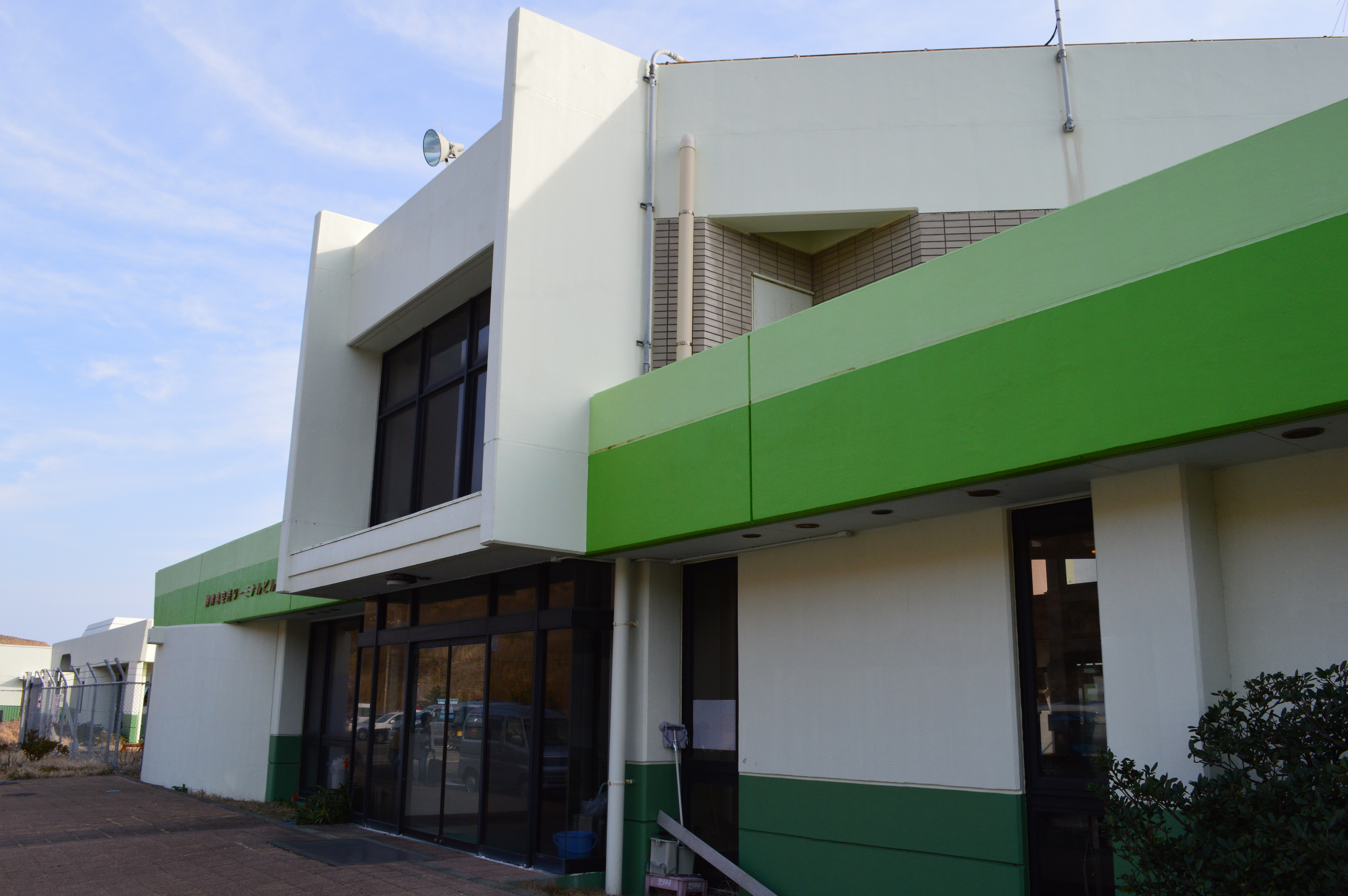
- IATA: none; ICAO: RJAZ

Summary
- Airport type: Public
- Operator: Tokyo Municipal Government
- Location: Kōzushima, Japan
- Elevation AMSL: 454 ft / 138 m
- Coordinates: 34°11′22″N 139°08′01″E

Map
- Location in Japan

Runways
Direction	Length		Surface
Direction	m	ft	Surface
11/29	800	2,625	Concrete

Statistics (2015)
- Passengers: 20,755
- Cargo (metric tonnes): 0
- Aircraft movement: 2,057
- Source: Japanese AIP at AIS Japan; Japanese Ministry of Land, Infrastructure, Transport and Tourism

Kōzushima Airport (神津島空港, Kōzushima Kūkō) (ICAO: RJAZ) is a regional airport serving Kōzushima in the northern Izu Islands, Tokyo, Japan. Operated by the Tokyo government, it is located 1.7 NM (3.1 km; 2.0 mi) south of the Kōzushima village office. It began operations in July 1992.

== Airlines and destinations ==
Airlines	Destinations
New Central Airservice	Chōfu

== Gallery ==
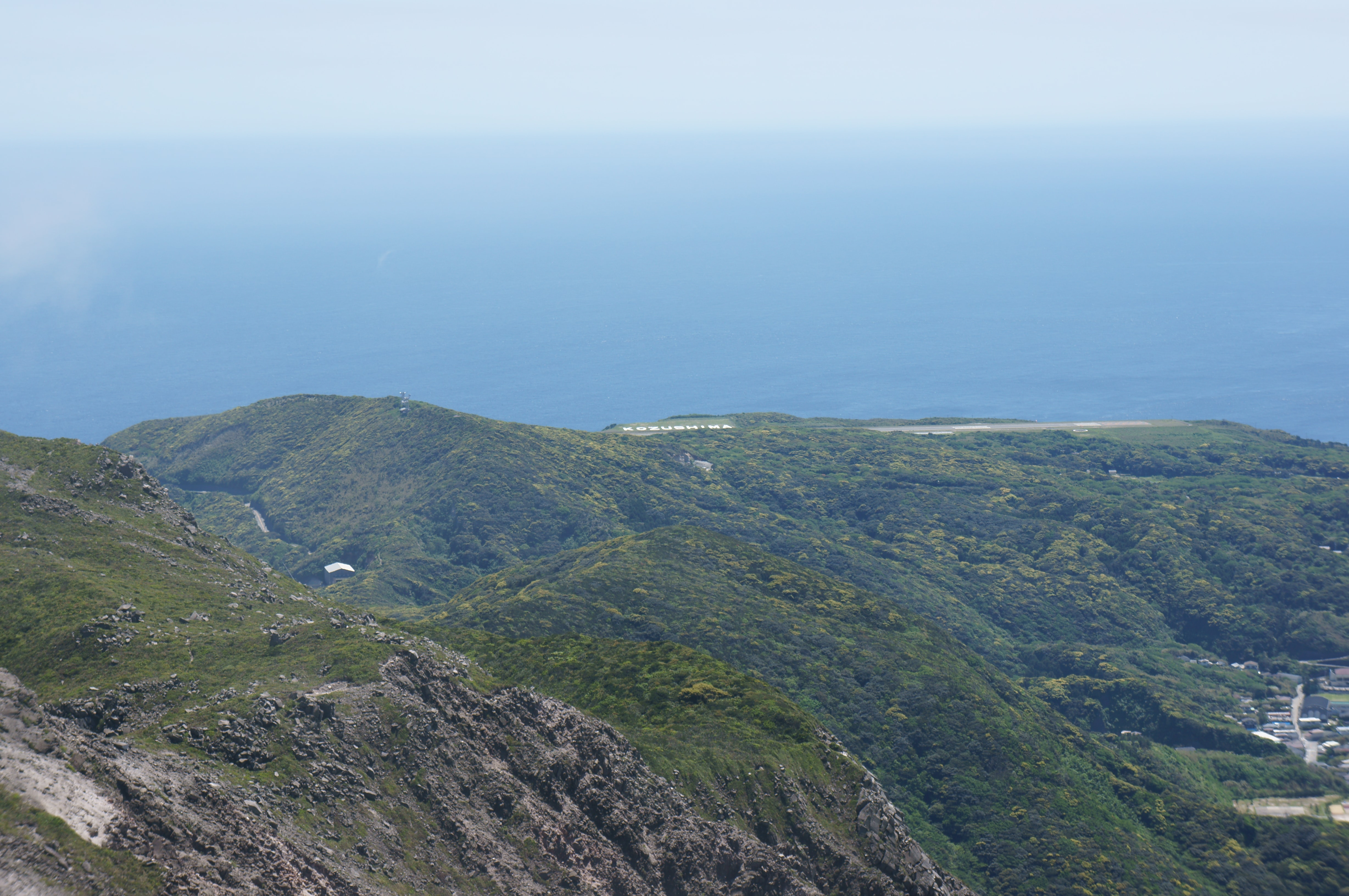
Kozushima Airport from Tenjō-san, the volcano that dominates the island's center.
