= Seongmu Airport =

Seongmu Airport 공군사관학교성무비행훈련장
- IATA: none; ICAO: RKTE

Summary
- Airport type: Military
- Owner: Republic of Korea Air Force
- Operator: Republic of Korea Air Force Academy
- Location: Cheongju, South Korea
- Elevation AMSL: 258 ft / 79 m
- Coordinates: 36°34′05″N 127°30′00″E
- Interactive map of Seongmu Airport

Runways
Direction	Length		Surface
Direction	m	ft	Surface
16/34	1,219	4,000	Concrete
- Source: DAFIF

Seongmu Airport (ICAO: RKTE) is an airfield which is used by the Korea Air Force Academy for flight training. The airfield has a single runway (16/34).
