= Niijima Airport =

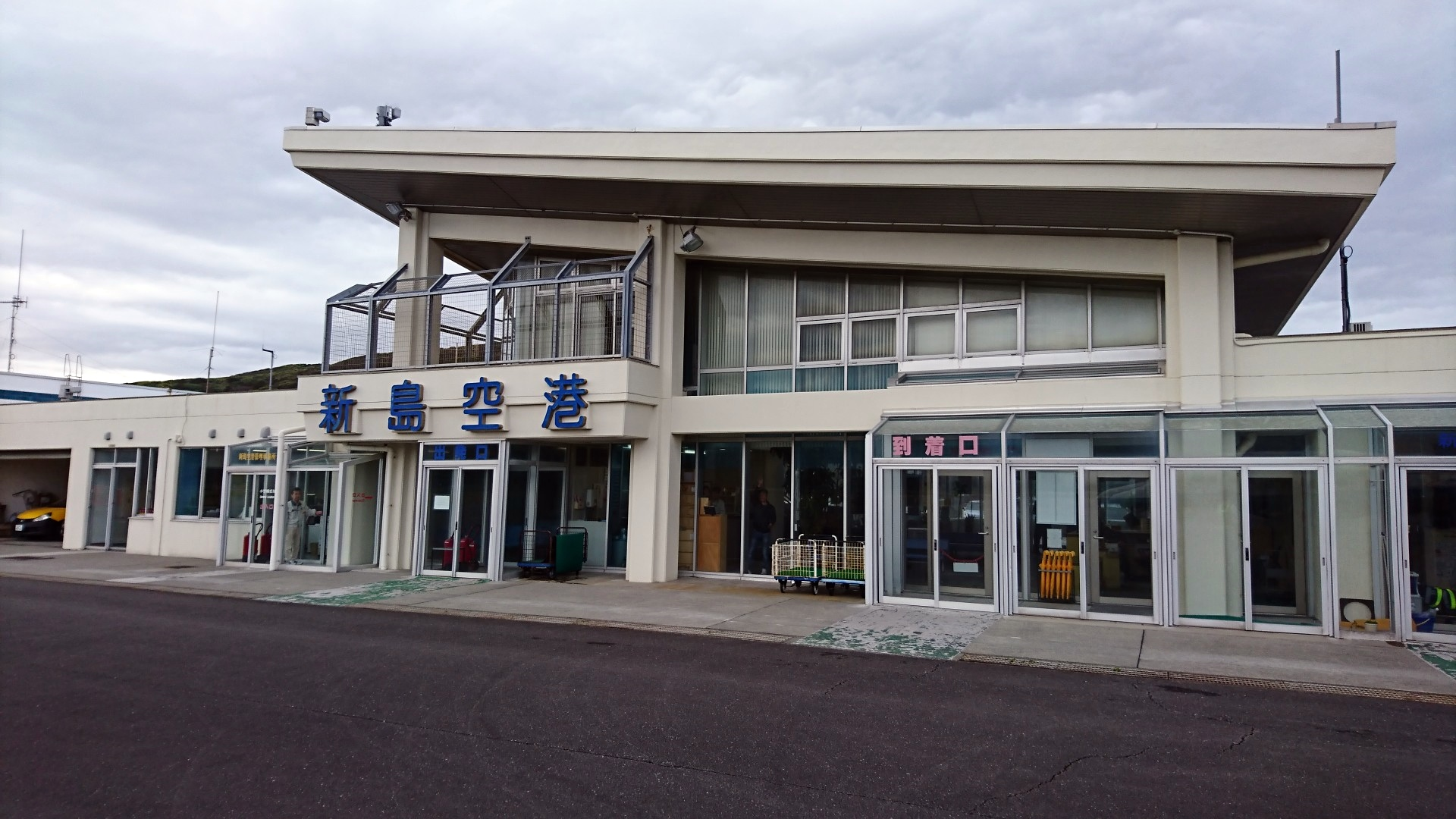
- IATA: none; ICAO: RJAN

Summary
- Airport type: Public
- Operator: Tokyo Metropolis
- Serves: Niijima Village, Japan
- Location: Niijima, Japan
- Elevation AMSL: 94 ft / 29 m
- Coordinates: 34°22′10″N 139°16′07″E

Map
- Location in Japan

Runways
Direction	Length		Surface
Direction	m	ft	Surface
11/29	800	2,625	Asphalt concrete

Statistics (2015)
- Passengers: 32,171
- Cargo (metric tonnes): 25
- Aircraft movement: 3,088
- Source: Japanese AIP at AIS Japan; Japanese Ministry of Land, Infrastructure, Transport and Tourism

Niijima Airport (新島空港, Niijima Kūkō) (ICAO: RJAN) is a public aerodrome located 1.5 NM (2.8 km; 1.7 mi) southeast of the village of Niijima, on the island of Niijima, one of the Izu Islands in the Philippine Sea, south of the Izu Peninsula, Japan. Niijima Village is part of Greater Metropolitan Tokyo, and the airport is operated by the Tokyo Municipal Government.

== History ==
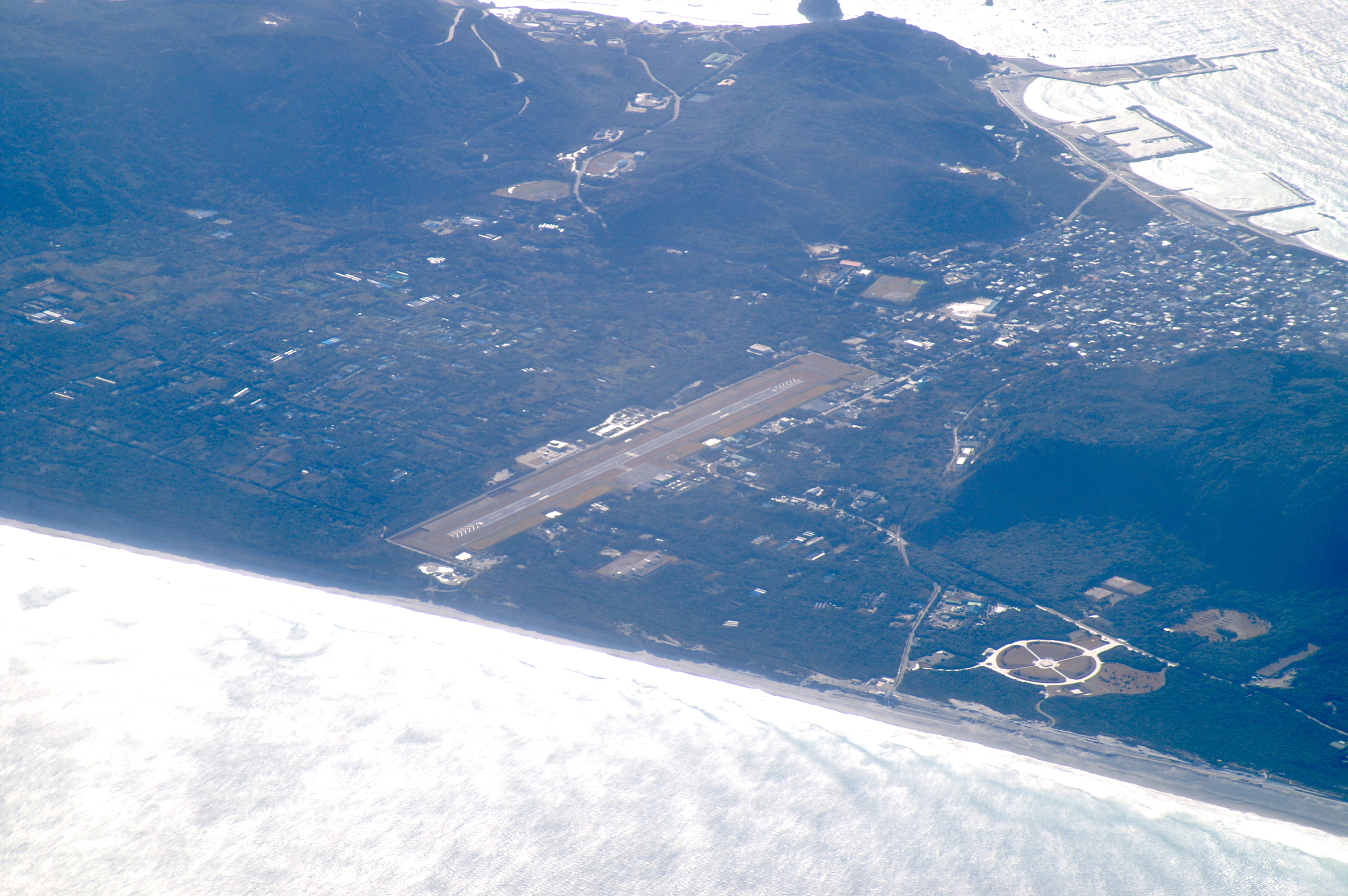
Bird view of the airport

Niijima Airport was opened in 1970 by the Niijima Village government. Regularly scheduled flights from Niijima to Chofu Airport in western Tokyo began in March 1979. It was granted a construction permit in 1984 to be upgraded to a national-standard tertiary airport, and construction was completed in 1987. A runway lighting system was installed in 1994.

== Airlines and destinations ==
Airlines	Destinations
New Central Airservice	Chōfu

== Ground Transportation ==
- There is a bus stop which is passed through a route bus ふれあいバス - Fureai Bus near to the airport. The bus stop is named as 健康センター - Kenko Center, and it takes about ten minutes from the airport to the bus stop on foot.
