= Miyakejima Airport =

Miyakejima Airport 三宅島空港
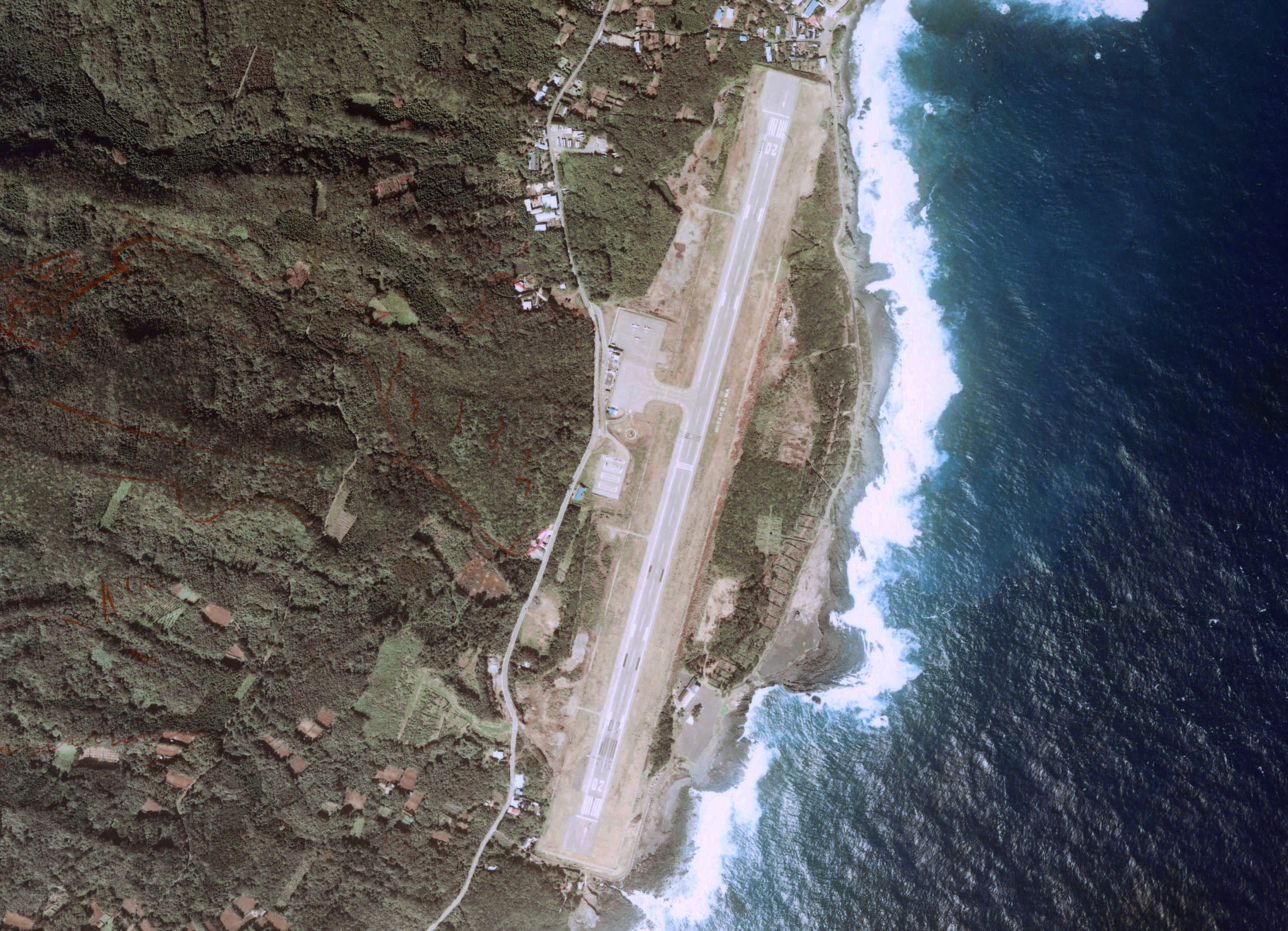
- IATA: MYE; ICAO: RJTQ

Summary
- Airport type: Public
- Operator: Tokyo Metropolitan Government
- Serves: Miyakejima
- Location: Miyakejima
- Elevation AMSL: 65 ft / 20 m
- Coordinates: 34°04′25″N 139°33′37″E

Map
- Location in Japan

Runways
Direction	Length		Surface
Direction	m	ft	Surface
02/20	1,200	3,937	Asphalt concrete

Statistics (2015)
- Passengers: 22,153
- Cargo (metric tonnes): 8
- Aircraft movement: 2,348
- Source: Japanese Ministry of Land, Infrastructure, Transport and Tourism

Miyakejima Airport (三宅島空港, Miyakejima Kūkō) (IATA: MYE, ICAO: RJTQ) is an airport located 19 km (12 mi) east of Miyake village on the island of Miyakejima in the Miyake Subprefecture Tokyo, Japan.

In the past, flights from Haneda Airport were suspended as the area contained high sulfuric gas concentration from the July 14, 2000 volcanic eruption. Flights have resumed during April 2008, after sulfuric gases in the air have dropped to levels below 0.2ppm. There is also a helicopter that arrives via Izu Ōshima.

== Airlines and destinations ==
Airlines	Destinations
New Central Airservice	Chōfu
Toho Air Service	Mikurajima, Oshima
