= Okayama Airport =

Okayama Airport 岡山空港
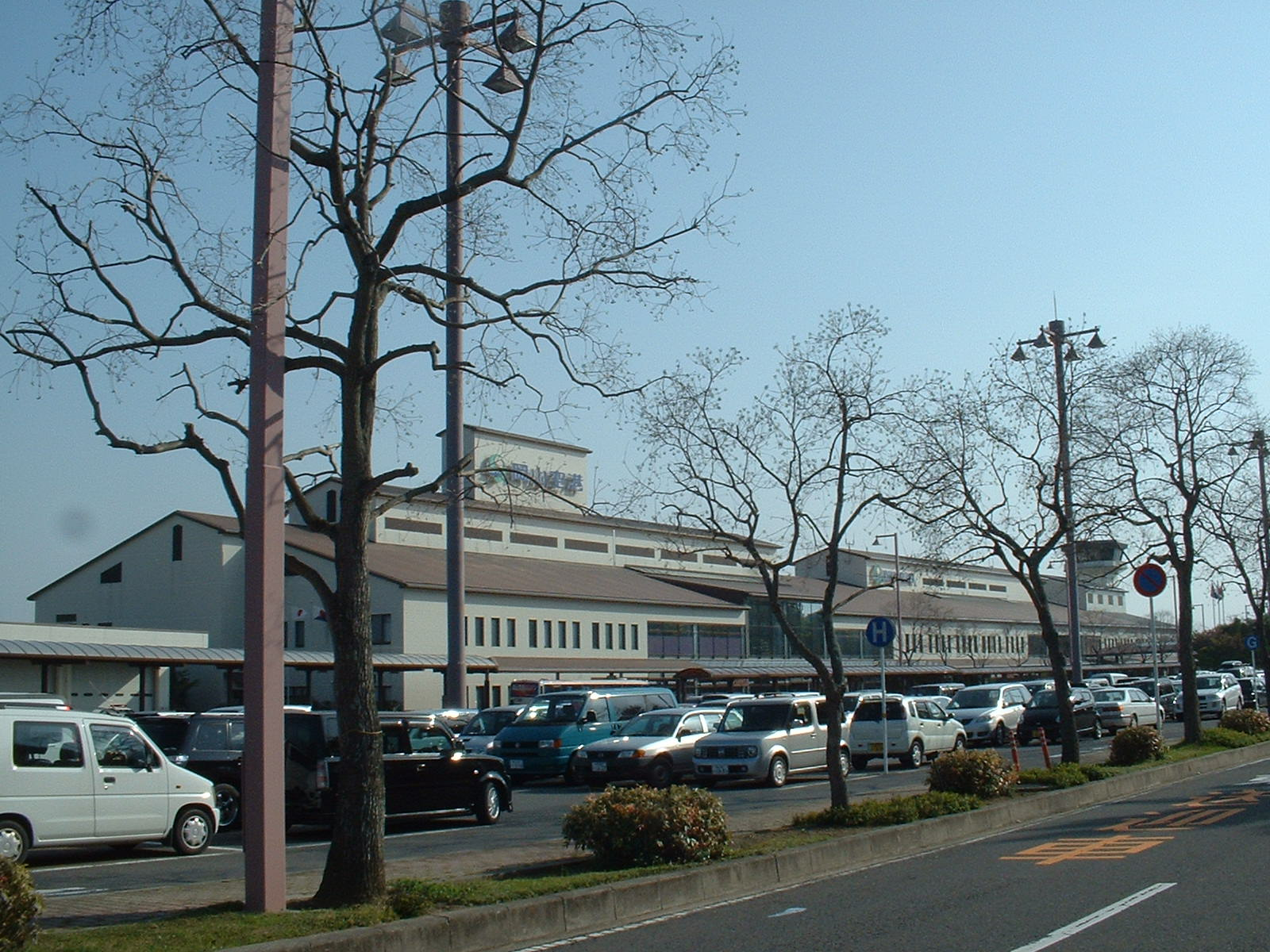
- IATA: OKJ; ICAO: RJOB

Summary
- Airport type: Public
- Location: Kita-ku, Okayama, Okayama Prefecture, Japan
- Opened: March 11, 1988; 38 years ago
- Elevation AMSL: 785 ft (239 m)
- Coordinates: 34°45′15″N 133°51′11″E
- Website: www.okayama-airport.org

Map
- Location in Okayama Prefecture Location in Japan

Runways
Direction	Length		Surface
Direction	m	ft	Surface
07/25	3,000	9,843	Asphalt

Statistics (2015)
- Passengers: 1,391,723
- Cargo (metric tonnes): 5,052
- Aircraft movement: 11,558
- Source: Japanese Ministry of Land, Infrastructure, Transport and Tourism

Okayama Airport (岡山空港, Okayama Kūkō) (IATA: OKJ, ICAO: RJOB) is an airport in Okayama Prefecture, Japan. It is also known as Okayama Momotaro Airport.

It is located 18 km (11 mi) northwest of central Okayama City and 11.5 km (7.1 mi) northwest or 30 minutes by bus from Okayama Station. It is about 10 minutes from the Okayama interchange, Sanyo Expressway.

== History ==
The airport opened in March 1988 as a replacement for the former Okayama Airport located on the waterfront in Minami-ku, Okayama. Its runway, originally 2,000 m in length, was extended to 2,500 m in 1993 and to 3,000 m in 2001.

== Airlines and destinations ==
Airlines	Destinations
All Nippon Airways	Tokyo–Haneda
ANA Wings	Tokyo–Haneda; Seasonal: Sapporo–Chitose
Japan Airlines	Tokyo–Haneda
Japan Transocean Air	Naha
Korean Air	Seoul–Incheon
Tigerair Taiwan	Kaohsiung, Taipei–Taoyuan

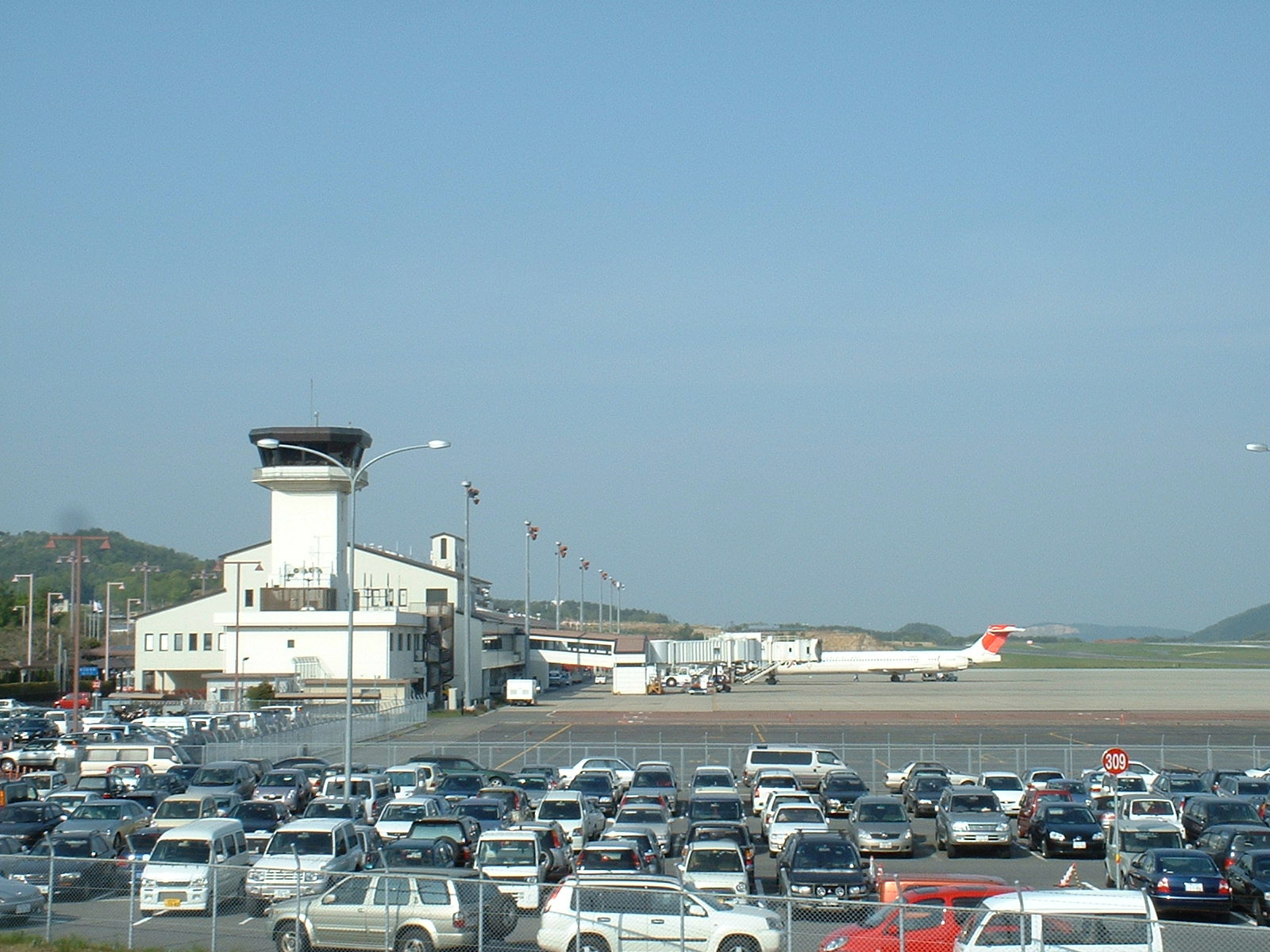
A view of the Okayama Airport terminal and control tower from the parking lot

== Transportation ==
Bus service to the airport from Okayama Station is provided by Okaden Bus and Chūtetsu Bus. Bus service to Kurashiki Station is provided by Chūtetsu Bus and Shimoden Bus. Bus times are coordinated with the flight times. Although the scheduled times are relatively close to the departure and arrivals times of flights, this is because the airport is small and it takes relatively little time to proceed through the airport.

== See also ==
- List of airports in Japan
