= Toho Air Service =

Helicopter airline based in Tokyo, Japan

Toho Air Service 東邦航空
IATA	ICAO	Call sign
-	THK	-
- Founded: July 7, 1960
- Fleet size: 10 (9 helicopters, 1 aircraft)
- Destinations: 6
- Parent company: Kawata Technologies, Inc.
- Headquarters: Tokyo Heliport; Shin-Kiba, Tokyo
- Key people: Masayuki Yudagawa (President)
- Website: www.tohoair.co.jp

Toho Air Service (東邦航空, Tōhō-Kōkū) is a Japanese airline based in Tokyo Heliport, Shin-Kiba, Tokyo. Their fleet consists mostly of helicopters and operate regular passenger services within the Izu Islands. Toho Air Service also provides helicopters in mountain rescue or for private purposes.

== Overview and operations ==
The airline was founded in 1960 as Mitsuya Airlines. The name was changed to the current name in 1967.

On behalf of the Tokyo Metropolitan Islands Promotion Corporation, Toho Air Service has operated the "Tokyo Ai-Land Shuttle" since 1993, a regular helicopter service in the Izu Islands. This is the only regular scheduled helicopter service in Japan. The islands served include Ōshima, To-shima, Miyake-jima, Mikura-jima, Hachijō-jima, and Aogashima. Since 2018, citizens of the Izu Islands are eligible for an "islander discount". As of March 2019, the airline has carried over 400,000 passengers.

== Fleet ==
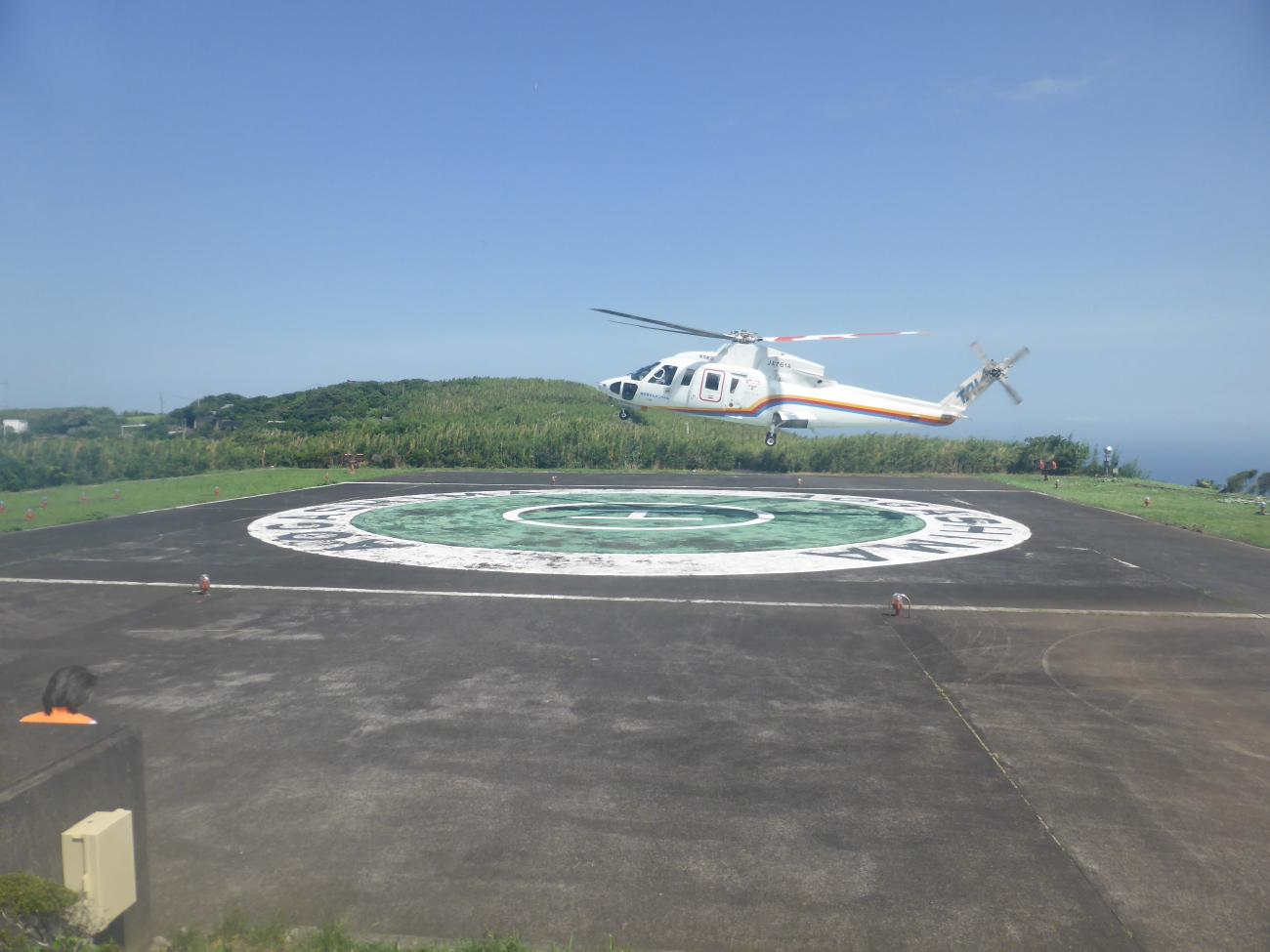
Sikorsky S-76 of Toho Air Service arriving at Aogashima Heliport

Toho Air Service operates both helicopters and aircraft for various purposes.

- Aérospatiale Alouette III
- Aérospatiale Dauphin 2
- Aérospatiale Écureuil 2
- Aérospatiale Écureuil
- Aérospatiale Super Puma
- Cessna 172 Skyhawk
- Eurocopter EC135
- Eurocopter EC155
- Sikorsky S-76
