= Lists of airports in Asia =

Airports in Asia

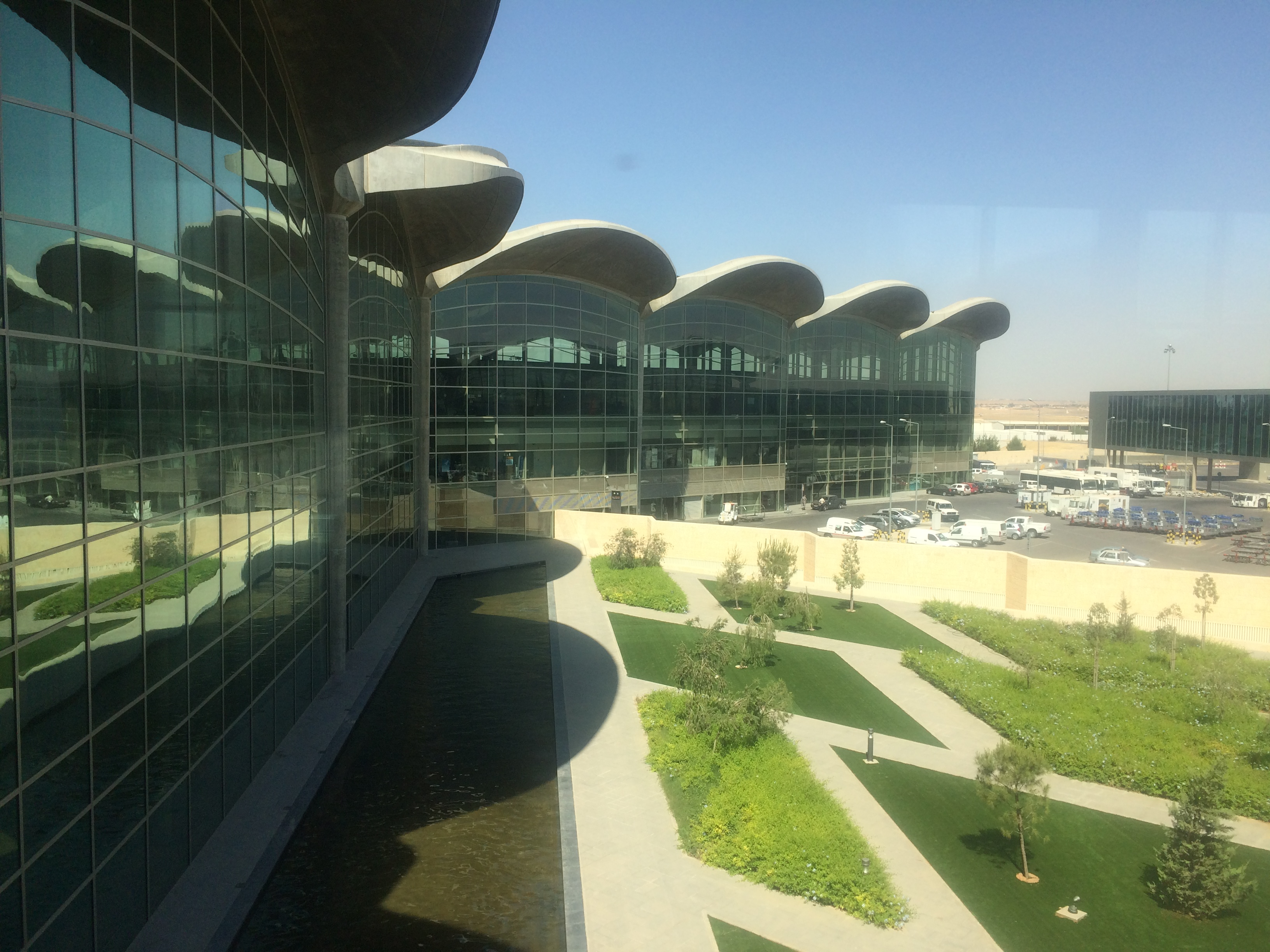
Queen Alia International Airport, Amman, Jordan

This page contains the lists of airports in Asia by country, grouped by region and activity. The lists include both military air bases and civilian airports. There are lists for countries with limited international recognition and for dependencies of other countries.

== By activity ==
- List of the busiest airports in Asia
- List of the busiest airports in Southeast Asia

== Western Asia ==
- List of airports in Abkhazia
- List of airports in Armenia
- List of airports in Azerbaijan
- List of airports in Bahrain
- List of airports in Northern Cyprus
- List of airports in Georgia
- List of airports in Iran
- List of airports in Iraq
- List of airports in Israel
- List of airports in Jordan
- List of airports in Kuwait
- List of airports in Lebanon
- List of airports in Oman
- List of airports in the State of Palestine
- List of airports in Qatar
- List of airports in Saudi Arabia
- List of airports in Syria
- List of airports in Turkey
- List of airports in the United Arab Emirates
- List of airports in Yemen

== Central Asia ==
- List of airports in Kazakhstan
- List of airports in Kyrgyzstan
- List of airports in Tajikistan
- List of airports in Turkmenistan
- List of airports in Uzbekistan

== Northern Asia ==
- List of airports in Russia

== Eastern Asia ==
- List of airports in China
- List of airports in Hong Kong
- List of airports in Japan
- List of airports in Macau
- List of airports in Mongolia
- List of airports in North Korea
- List of airports in South Korea
- List of airports in Taiwan

== Southern Asia ==
- List of airports in Afghanistan
- List of airports in Bangladesh
- List of airports in Bhutan
- List of airports in the British Indian Ocean Territory
- List of airports in India
- List of airports in the Maldives
- List of airports in Nepal
- List of airports in Pakistan
- List of airports in Sri Lanka

== Southeastern Asia ==
- List of airports in Brunei
- List of airports in Cambodia
- List of airports in Indonesia
- List of airports in Laos
- List of airports in Malaysia
- List of airports in Myanmar
- List of airports in the Philippines
- List of airports in Singapore
- List of airports in Thailand
- List of airports in Timor-Leste
- List of airports in Vietnam

== See also ==
- Lists of airports
- List of busiest airports in Asia
- Wikipedia:WikiProject Aviation/Airline destination lists: Asia
