= Yellow Jacket Flying Club =

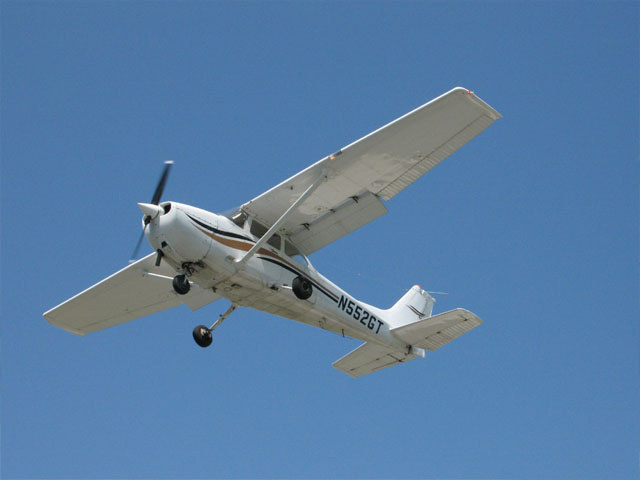
The YJFC aircraft are adorned in Georgia Tech colors and use N-numbers ending with GT (golf tango).

The Yellow Jacket Flying Club (YJFC) is a non-profit, student run organization at Georgia Tech in Atlanta, Georgia which exists to provide opportunities for those in the Georgia Tech community to pursue their passion for aviation. The YJFC is open to Georgia Tech students, faculty and staff, alumni, and their immediate families and is one of the few well-established university affiliated flying clubs in the United States.

The Yellow Jacket Flying Club is exposed to aviation and the aerospace industry in a city that claims the world's busiest airport and by an institute with a school of aerospace engineering. Georgia Tech was ranked first by U.S. News & World Report among US universities with undergraduate aerospace engineering programs and fourth among the nation's top engineering schools.

The club currently owns and maintains four aircraft, all of which are Cessna 172 Skyhawks, based out of Dekalb-Peachtree Airport. The club's aircraft are separated into trainers for teaching flight instruction, and cross-country aircraft for touring and use by club members. A group of alumni who are also Certified Flight Instructors train club members and students on a daily basis. YJFC members can choose to pursue their private pilots license, all the way through an ATP (air transport pilot) license.

Besides the daily availability of airplanes for personal use, the Yellow Jacket Flying Club is also a social organization. Club meetings are held on a bi-weekly basis and often feature speakers from the aviation community, from flying gliders to getting a job with a major airline. Once a semester during spring, summer, and fall, the YJFC holds a "Fly-In" where members "take over" an airport in the Atlanta area by bringing club planes, and usually several others. During this, the biggest social event of the semester, members challenge each other – and members of other flying organization, to flying events such as spot landing contests and water balloon drops.
