= Lists of the busiest airports =

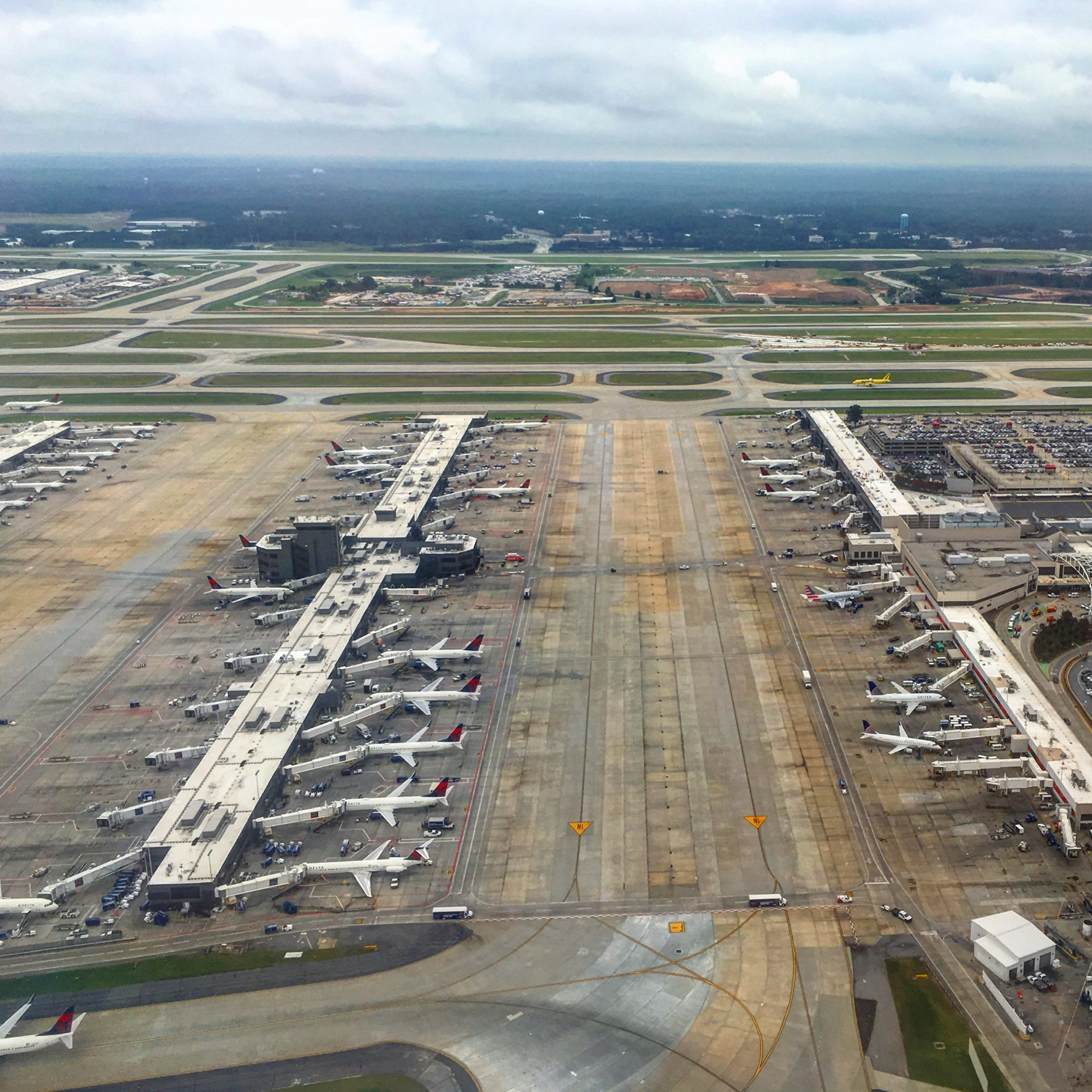
Hartsfield–Jackson Atlanta International Airport, Atlanta, Georgia, United States, the busiest airport in the world by passenger traffic and aircraft movements

This list of the busiest airports includes the world's busiest airports by a range of criteria. The criteria are specified by the Airports Council International (ACI) in Montreal, Canada. The ACI defines and measures the following four types of airport traffic: passenger traffic, international passenger traffic, cargo traffic and aircraft movements.

== Busiest airport by traffic type ==
=== Busiest airport by passenger traffic ===
Hartsfield–Jackson Atlanta International Airport, Georgia, United States has been the busiest airport by passenger traffic since 2021. It was also the busiest airport from 1998-2019, only missing out in 2020 when it was passed by Guangzhou Baiyun International Airport in China. Passenger traffic is defined by the ACI as the total passengers embarked and disembarked, but passengers in transit are only counted once.

=== Busiest airport by international passenger traffic ===
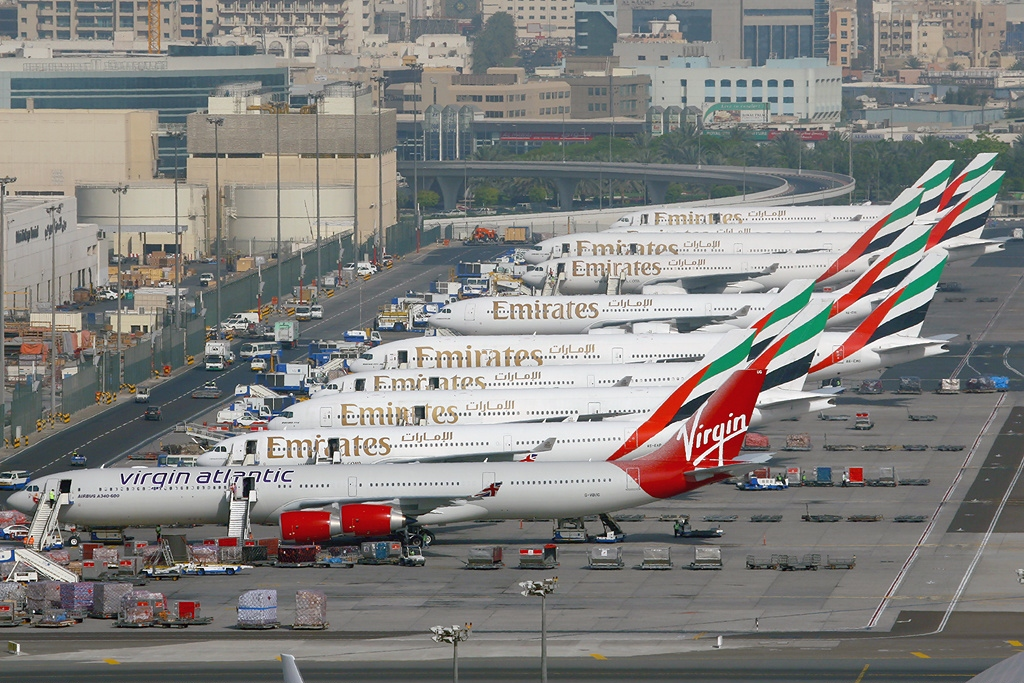
Dubai International Airport, the busiest airport by international passenger traffic

Dubai International Airport, Dubai, United Arab Emirates has served the most international passengers annually since 2014.

=== Busiest airport by aircraft movements ===
Chicago O’Hare International Airport tops the list for total aircraft movements, defined by the ACI as total landings and takeoffs with over 860,015 in 2025.

=== Busiest airport by cargo traffic ===
Hong Kong International Airport, New Territories, Hong Kong is the busiest by cargo traffic and has held the top spot since 2022. Previously, from 2020 to 2021, Memphis International Airport was the busiest cargo airport in the world. The busiest airport by cargo traffic is defined by the ACI as the airport which has handled the most loaded and unloaded freight and mail, by mass.

== Busiest city destination ==
The Airports of London combined make London, United Kingdom the busiest city destination. The city transports the most passengers annually across all of its airports, and has been the busiest city destination since 2010.

== Busiest airport by continent ==
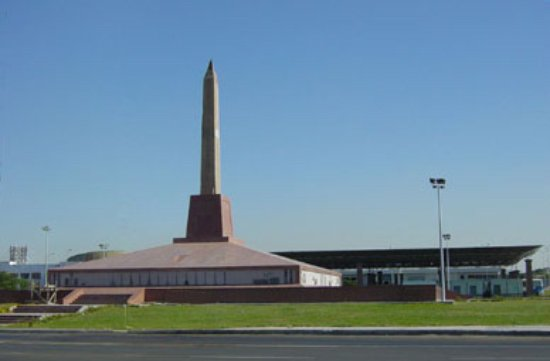
Cairo International Airport, the busiest airport in Africa

=== Busiest airport in Africa ===
Cairo International Airport in Egypt has been the busiest airport in Africa since 2020.

==== By country ====
- List of the busiest airports in Morocco
- List of the busiest airports in South Africa
- List of the busiest airports in Tanzania

=== Busiest airport in Asia ===
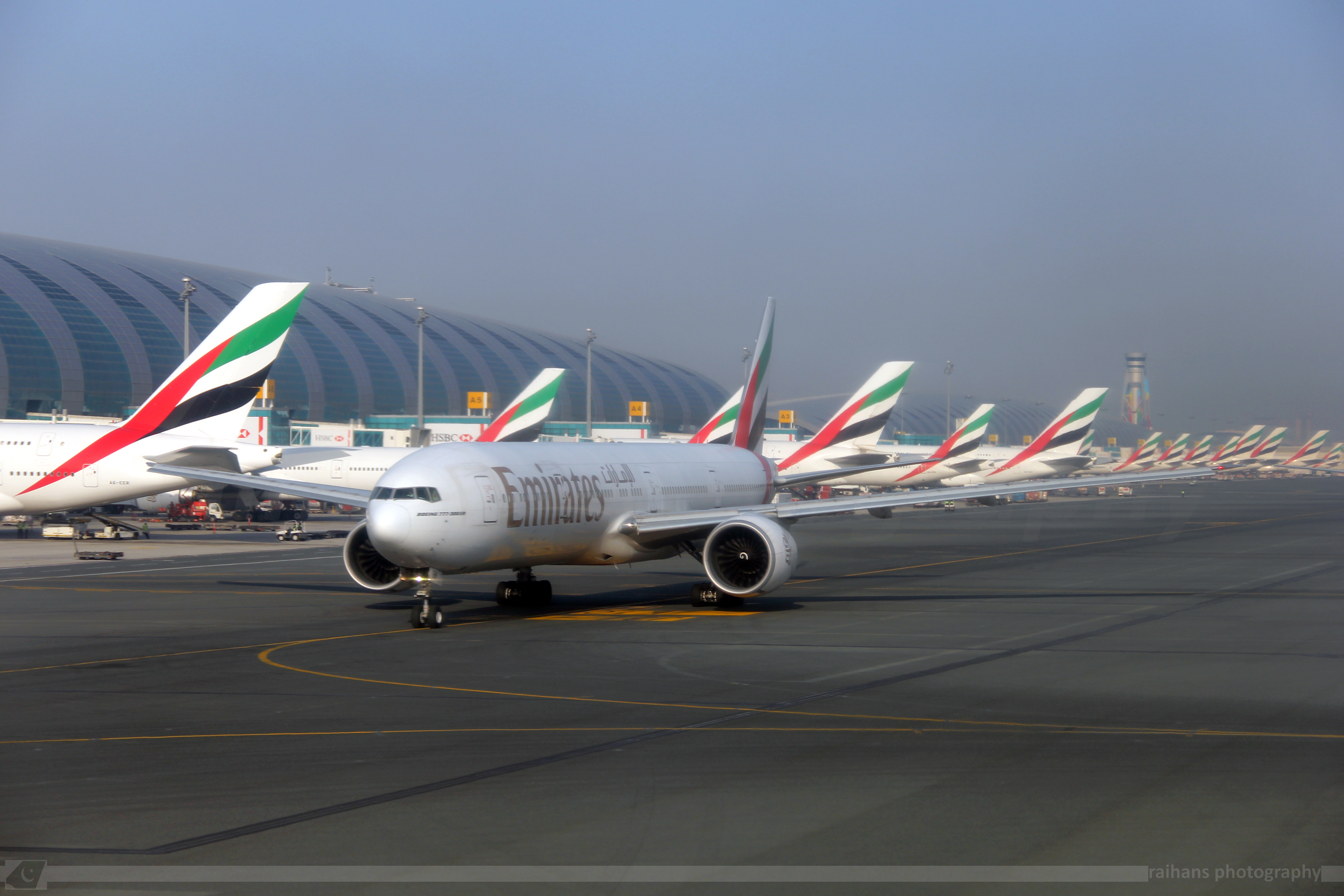
Dubai International Airport, the busiest airport in Asia

Dubai International Airport, United Arab Emirates is the busiest airport in Asia.

==== By region ====
- List of the busiest airports in the Middle East
- List of the busiest airports in the former Soviet Union
- List of the busiest airports in Southeast Asia

==== By country ====
- List of the busiest airports in China
- List of the busiest airports in Georgia
- List of the busiest airports in India
- List of the busiest airports in Indonesia
- List of the busiest airports in Iran
- List of the busiest airports in Japan
- List of the busiest airports in Kazakhstan
- List of the busiest airports in Malaysia
- List of the busiest airports in Nepal
- List of the busiest airports in Pakistan
- List of the busiest airports in the Philippines
- List of the busiest airports in Russia
- List of the busiest airports in South Korea
- List of the busiest airports in Taiwan
- List of the busiest airports in Thailand
- List of the busiest airports in Turkey
- List of the busiest airports in Vietnam

=== Busiest airport in Europe ===
London Heathrow Airport Terminal 5 serving London, United Kingdom, the busiest airport in Europe

London Heathrow Airport, London, United Kingdom is the busiest airport in Europe.

==== By region ====
- List of the busiest airports in the Baltic states
- List of the busiest airports in the European Union
- List of the busiest airports in the Nordic countries
- List of the busiest airports in the former Soviet Union

==== By country ====
- List of the busiest airports in Austria
- List of the busiest airports in Belgium
- List of the busiest airports in Bulgaria
- List of the busiest airports in Croatia
- List of the busiest airports in France
- List of the busiest airports in Germany
- List of the busiest airports in Greece
- List of the busiest airports in Hungary
- List of the busiest airports in Ireland
- List of the busiest airports in Italy
- List of the busiest airports in the Netherlands
- List of the busiest airports in Poland
- List of the busiest airports in Portugal
- List of the busiest airports in Romania
- List of the busiest airports in Russia
- List of the busiest airports in Spain
- List of the busiest airports in Switzerland
- List of the busiest airports in Turkey
- List of the busiest airports in Ukraine
- List of the busiest airports in the United Kingdom

=== Busiest airport in North America ===
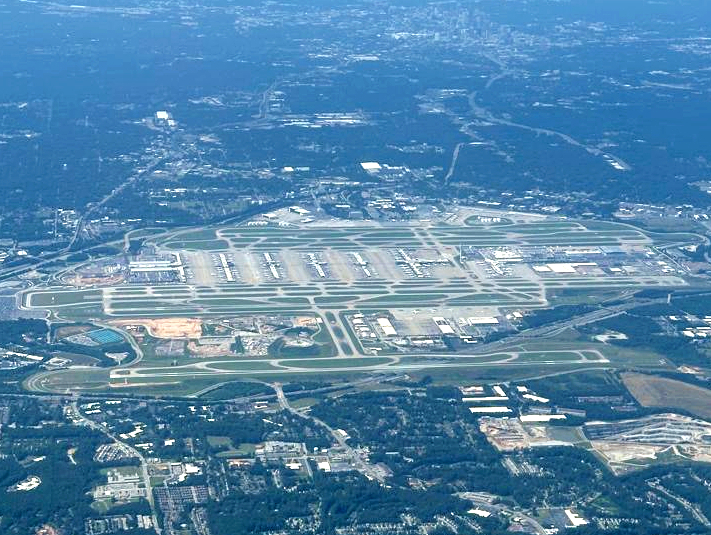
Aerial view of Hartsfield–Jackson Atlanta International Airport, the busiest airport in North America

Hartsfield–Jackson Atlanta International Airport, Georgia, United States is the busiest airport in North America.

==== By region ====
- List of the busiest airports in the Caribbean
- List of the busiest airports in Central America
- List of the busiest airports in Latin America

==== By country ====
- List of the busiest airports in Canada
- List of the busiest airports in Dominican Republic
- List of the busiest airports in Mexico
- List of the busiest airports in the United States
  - List of the busiest cargo airports in the United States
  - List of the busiest airports in California
  - List of the busiest airports in Texas

=== Busiest airport in Oceania ===
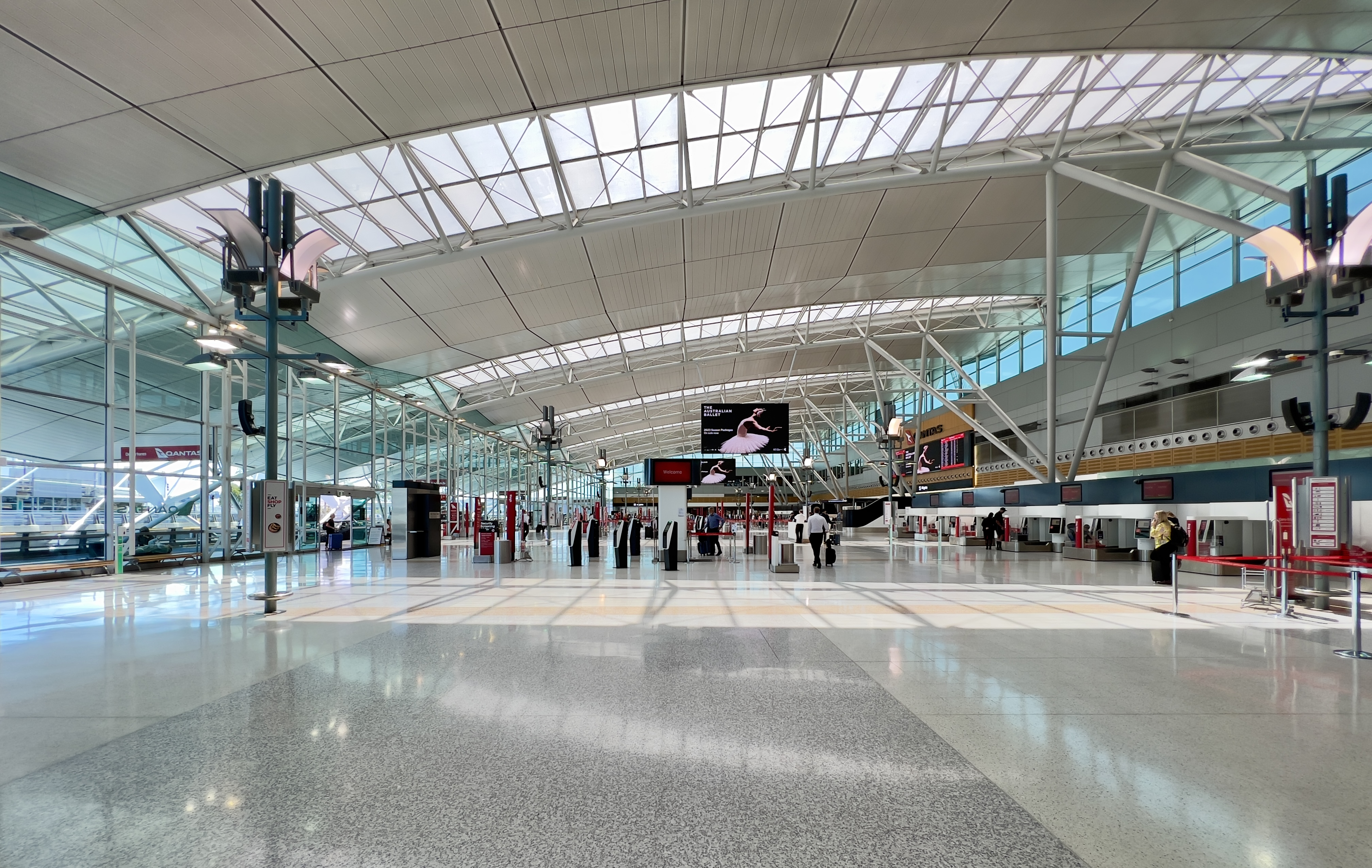
Sydney Airport, the busiest airport in Oceania

Sydney Airport, Australia is the busiest airport in Oceania as of 2017.

==== By country ====
- List of the busiest airports in Australia
- List of the busiest airports in New Zealand

=== Busiest airport in South America ===
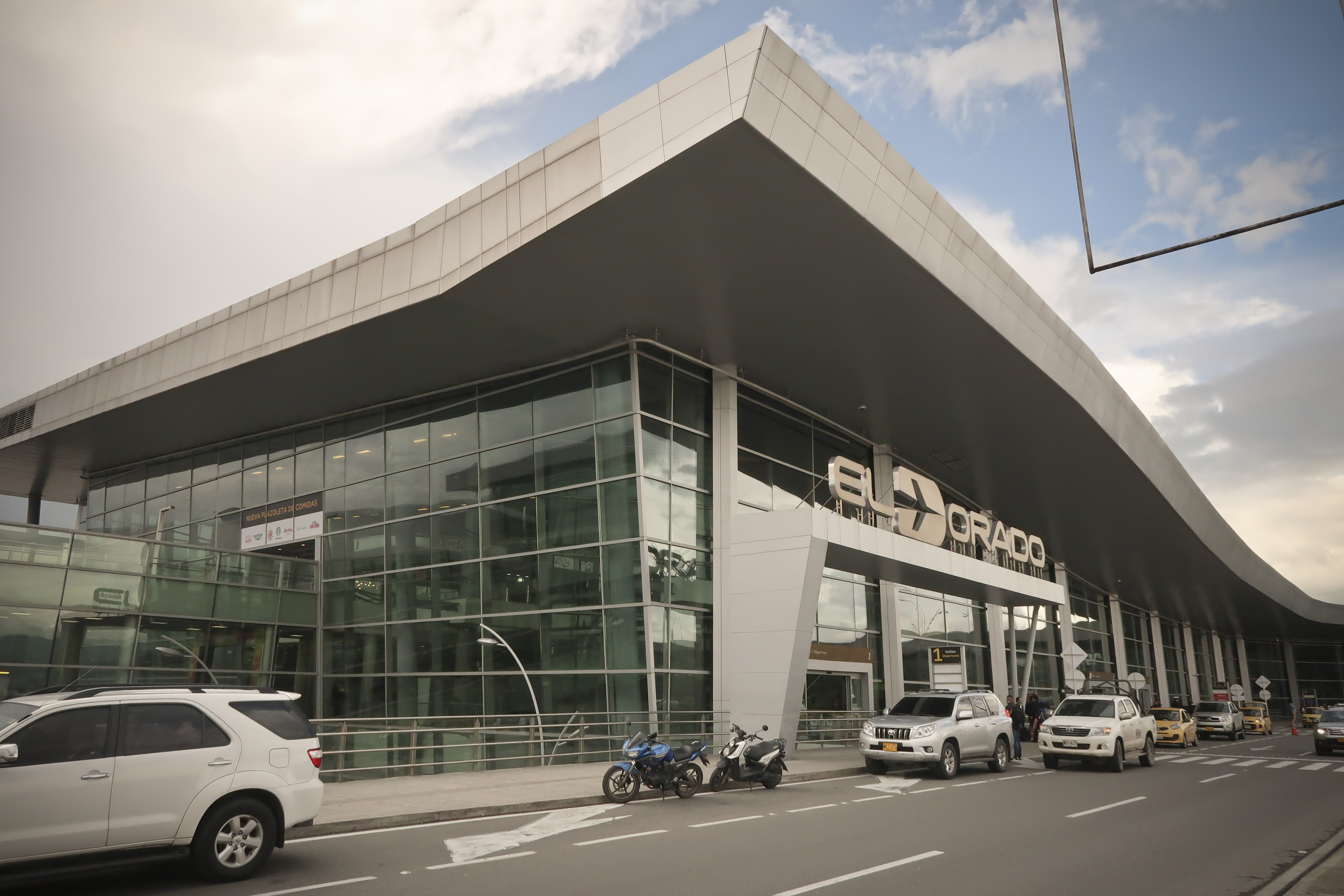
El Dorado International Airport in Bogotá, the busiest airport in South America

El Dorado International Airport, Bogotá, Colombia is the busiest airport in South America as of 2022.

==== By region ====
- List of the busiest airports in Latin America

==== By country ====
- List of the busiest airports in Argentina
- List of the busiest airports in Brazil
- List of the busiest airports in Chile
- List of the busiest airports in Colombia
- List of the busiest airports in Ecuador
- List of the busiest airports in Paraguay
- List of the busiest airports in Peru

== Historical claims ==
- Midway International Airport, Chicago, Illinois, United States

In the late 1940s, Chicago Midway was the busiest airport in the United States by total aircraft operations – i.e., including every training aircraft practicing take-offs and landings. New York LaGuardia had the most airline operations and passengers until the early 1950s, when Chicago Midway became the busiest airport in the United States by any criterion. Before World War II, Chicago Midway was the origin or destination of one in four U.S. airline flights, although a 1939 Official Aviation Guide shows more airline flights scheduled at Newark than at Chicago.

- Memphis International Airport, Memphis, Tennessee, United States

As the home of FedEx Express, Memphis had the largest cargo operations worldwide from 1993 to 2009. It remains the busiest cargo airport in the United States and the Western Hemisphere.

== See also ==
- Lists of airports
- List of countries by airline passengers
- Largest airlines in the world
- List of busiest railway stations
