= List of the busiest airports in Southeast Asia =

This is a list of the busiest airports in south-east Asia, by annual total passengers, ranked and itemised by its total passengers per year, which includes arrival, departure, and transit passengers. Note that airports in Laos, Timor-Leste, Cambodia, Myanmar, and Brunei Darussalam are not listed here; due to either the lack of statistics, non-existent data, or for its lack of passenger numbers.

== Airport statistics ==
=== 2023 statistics ===
Port Authority of New York and New Jersey's (PANYNJ) full-year figures are as follows, unless indicated otherwise:

2023 statistics
rank	airport	location	country	code (IATA / ICAO)	Domestic passengers	International passengers	Total passengers	% Change from 2022
1	Singapore Changi Airport	Changi, East Region	Singapore	SIN / WSSS	N/A	58,946,000	58,946,000	▲38.0%
2	Suvarnabhumi Airport	Bang Phli, Samut Prakan	Thailand	BKK / VTBS	N/A	N/A	51,699,104	▲388.0%
3	Soekarno–Hatta International Airport	Tangerang, Banten, Greater Jakarta	Indonesia	CGK / WIII	N/A	N/A	49,080,532	▲148.0%
4	Kuala Lumpur International Airport	Sepang, Selangor	Malaysia	KUL / WMKK	N/A	N/A	47,242,648	▲86.0%
5	Ninoy Aquino International Airport	Pasay/Parañaque, Metro Manila	Philippines	MNL / RPLL	N/A	N/A	45,300,302	▲121.0%

=== 2022 statistics ===
Port Authority of New York and New Jersey's (PANYNJ) full-year figures are as follows, unless indicated otherwise:

2022 statistics
rank	airport	location	country	code (IATA / ICAO)	domestic passengers	international passengers	total passengers
1	Singapore Changi Airport	Changi, East Region	Singapore	SIN / WSSS	na	42,600,000	42,600,000
2	Kuala Lumpur International Airport	Sepang, Selangor	Malaysia	KUL / WMKK	11,125,223	14,104,008	25,399,296
3	Suvarnabhumi Airport	Bang Phli, Samut Prakan	Thailand	BKK / VTBS	9,752,588	10,585,839	20,338,427
4	Ninoy Aquino International Airport	Pasay/Parañaque, Metro Manila	Philippines	MNL / RPLL	10,308,191	10,203,888	20,512,079
5	Soekarno–Hatta International Airport	Tangerang, Banten, Greater Jakarta	Indonesia	CGK / WIII	16,070,990 est.	3,755,077	19,826,067

=== 2019 statistics ===
Port Authority of New York and New Jersey's (PANYNJ) full-year figures are as follows, unless indicated otherwise:

2019 statistics
rank	airport	location	country	code (IATA / ICAO)	domestic passengers	international passengers	total passengers
1	Singapore Changi Airport	Changi, East Region	Singapore	SIN / WSSS	na	68,283,000	68,283,000
2	Suvarnabhumi Airport	Bang Phli, Samut Prakan	Thailand	BKK / VTBS	12,488,279	52,933,565	65,421,844
3	Kuala Lumpur International Airport	Sepang, Selangor	Malaysia	KUL / WMKK	17,511,784	44,854,685	62,336,469
4	Soekarno–Hatta International Airport	Tangerang, Banten, Greater Jakarta	Indonesia	CGK / WIII	15,780,000 est.	38,716,625	54,496,625
5	Ninoy Aquino International Airport	Pasay/Parañaque, Metro Manila	Philippines	MNL / RPLL	22,913,607	24,984,439	47,898,046

=== 2017 statistics ===
Airports Council International's (ACI) full-year figures are as follows:

2017 statistics
rank	airport	city, region	country	code (IATA / ICAO)	total passengers	% change
1	Soekarno–Hatta International Airport	Tangerang, Banten, Greater Jakarta	Indonesia	CGK / WIII	63,015,620	▲8.0%
2	Singapore Changi Airport	Changi, East Region	Singapore	SIN / WSSS	62,219,573	▲6.0%
3	Suvarnabhumi Airport	Bangkok / Samut Prakan	Thailand	BKK / VTBS	60,860,704	▲8.9%
4	Kuala Lumpur International Airport	Kuala Lumpur	Malaysia	KUL / WMKK	58,618,680	▲11.2%
5	Ninoy Aquino International Airport	Pasay/Parañaque, Metro Manila	Philippines	MNL / RPLL	42,022,484	▲6.1%
6	Don Mueang International Airport	Bangkok	Thailand	DMK / VTBD	38,299,757	▲8.8%
7	Tan Son Nhat International Airport	Ho Chi Minh City	Vietnam	SGN / VVTS	35,900,000	▲10.5%
8	Noi Bai International Airport	Hanoi	Vietnam	HAN / VVNB	23,068,227	▲12.0%
9	Ngurah Rai International Airport	Denpasar, Bali	Indonesia	DPS / WADD	22,863,647	▲12.5%
10	Juanda International Airport	Surabaya, East Java	Indonesia	SUB / WARR	21,882,335	▲10.9%
11	Phuket International Airport	Phuket	Thailand	HKT / VTSP	16,855,637	▲11.6%
12	Sultan Hasanuddin International Airport	Makassar, South Sulawesi	Indonesia	UPG / WAAA	12,293,962	▲17.7%
13	Da Nang International Airport	Da Nang	Vietnam	DAD / VVDN	10,860,235	▲24.1%
14	Chiang Mai International Airport	Chiang Mai	Thailand	CNX / VTCC	10,230,070	▲8.3%
15	Mactan–Cebu International Airport	Mactan, Cebu	Philippines	CEB / RPVM	10,050,940	▲13.8%
16	Kualanamu International Airport	Medan, North Sumatra	Indonesia	KNO / WIMM	10,041,568	▲18.8%
17	Kota Kinabalu International Airport	Kota Kinabalu	Malaysia	BKI / WBKK	8,006,446	▲10.23%
18	Adisutjipto International Airport	Yogyakarta, Java	Indonesia	JOG / WARJ	7,818,872	▲8.4%
19	Sultan Aji Muhammad Sulaiman Airport	Balikpapan, East Kalimantan, Borneo	Indonesia	BPN / WIPP	7,380,350	▼1.72%
20	Penang International Airport	Penang	Malaysia	PEN / WMKP	7,232,097	▲8.2%
21	Hang Nadim International Airport	Batam, Riau Islands	Indonesia	BTH / WIDD	6,355,113	▲3.84%

=== 2016 statistics ===
2016 statistics
rank	airport	city, region	country	code (IATA / ICAO)	total passengers
1	Singapore Changi Airport	Changi, East Region	Singapore	SIN / WSSS	59,780,000
2	Suvarnabhumi Airport	Bangkok / Samut Prakan	Thailand	BKK / VTBS	55,892,428
3	Soekarno–Hatta International Airport	Tangerang, Banten, Greater Jakarta	Indonesia	CGK / WIII	54,969,536
4	Kuala Lumpur International Airport	Kuala Lumpur	Malaysia	KUL / WMKK	52,620,000
5	Ninoy Aquino International Airport	Pasay/Parañaque, Metro Manila	Philippines	MNL / RPLL	39,500,000
6	Don Mueang International Airport	Bangkok	Thailand	DMK / VTBD	35,203,757
7	Tan Son Nhat International Airport	Ho Chi Minh City	Vietnam	SGN / VVTS	32,486,537
8	Noi Bai International Airport	Hanoi	Vietnam	HAN / VVNB	20,596,632
9	Ngurah Rai International Airport	Denpasar, Bali	Indonesia	DPS / WADD	19,986,415
10	Juanda International Airport	Surabaya, East Java	Indonesia	SUB / WARR	19,483,844
11	Phuket International Airport	Phuket	Thailand	HKT / VTSP	15,107,185
12	Sultan Hasanuddin International Airport	Makassar, South Sulawesi	Indonesia	UPG / WAAA	10,672,942
13	Chiang Mai International Airport	Chiang Mai	Thailand	CNX / VTCC	9,446,320
14	Kualanamu International Airport	Medan, North Sumatra	Indonesia	KNO / WIMM	8,956,724
15	Mactan–Cebu International Airport	Mactan, Cebu	Philippines	CEB / RPVM	8,830,638
16	Da Nang International Airport	Da Nang	Vietnam	DAD / VVDN	8,783,429
17	Sultan Aji Muhammad Sulaiman Airport	Balikpapan, East Kalimantan, Borneo	Indonesia	BPN / WIPP	7,510,090
18	Kota Kinabalu International Airport	Kota Kinabalu	Malaysia	BKI / WBKK	7,263,339
19	Adisutjipto International Airport	Yogyakarta, Java	Indonesia	JOG / WARJ	7,208,557
20	Penang International Airport	Penang	Malaysia	PEN / WMKP	6,684,026
21	Hang Nadim International Airport	Batam, Riau Islands	Indonesia	BTH / WIDD	6,120,000
22	Halim Perdanakusuma Airport	Jakarta	Indonesia	HLP / WIHH	5,614,005
23	Kuching International Airport	Kuching, Sarawak, Borneo	Malaysia	KCH / WBGG	4,919,677
24	Cam Ranh International Airport	Nha Trang	Vietnam	CXR / VVCR	4,858,362
25	Achmad Yani International Airport	Semarang, Central Java	Indonesia	HLP / WIHH	4,224,295
26	Krabi International Airport	Krabi	Thailand	KBV / VTSG	4,079,564
27	Hat Yai International Airport	Hat Yai, Songkhla	Thailand	HDY / VTSS	4,004,665
28	Sultan Mahmud Badaruddin II International Airport	Palembang, South Sumatra	Indonesia	PLM / WALL	3,899,187
29	Husein Sastranegara International Airport	Bandung, West Java	Indonesia	BDO / WICC	3,696,175
30	Minangkabau International Airport	Padang, West Sumatra	Indonesia	PDG / WIPT	3,618,642
31	Syamsudin Noor Airport	Banjarmasin, South Kalimantan, Borneo	Indonesia	BDJ / WAOO	3,613,473
32	Francisco Bangoy International Airport	Sasa, Buhangin, Davao City, Mindanao	Philippines	DVO / RPMD	3,553,201
33	Lombok International Airport	Central Lombok Regency, West Nusa Tenggara	Indonesia	LOP / WADL	3,450,000
34	Sultan Syarif Kasim II International Airport	Pekanbaru, Riau	Indonesia	PKU / WIBB	3,346,810
35	Supadio International Airport	Pontianak, West Kalimantan, Borneo	Indonesia	PNK / WIOO	3,182,167
36	Sultan Abdul Aziz Shah Airport	Subang, Petaling District, Selangor	Malaysia	SZB / WMSA	2,834,384
37	Senai International Airport	Senai, Kulai, Johor Bahru, Johor	Malaysia	JHB / WMKJ	2,828,074
38	Kalibo International Airport	Pook, Kalibo, Aklan	Philippines	KLO / RPVK	2,711,036
39	Sam Ratulangi International Airport	Manado, North Sulawesi	Indonesia	MDC / WAMM	2,671,997
40	Langkawi International Airport	Padang Matsirat, Langkawi, Kedah	Malaysia	LGK / WMKL	2,665,271
41	Samui Airport	Bo Phut, Ko Samui, Surat Thani	Thailand	USM / VTSM	2,554,624
42	Udon Thani Airport	Mueang Udon Thani District, Udon Thani Province	Thailand	UTH / VTUD	2,350,005
43	Miri International Airport	Miri, Sarawak, Borneo	Malaysia	MYY / WBGR	2,200,546
44	Phu Quoc International Airport	Phú Quốc, Kiên Giang, Mekong Delta	Vietnam	PQC / VVPQ	2,122,541
45	Sultan Ismail Petra Airport	Pengkalan Chepa, Kota Bharu, Kelantan	Malaysia	KBR / WMKC	2,062,248
46	Chiang Rai International Airport	Ban Du, Mueang Chiang Rai, Chiang Rai	Thailand	CEI / VTCT	2,038,389
47	Surat Thani International Airport	Hua Toei, Phunphin, Surat Thani	Thailand	URT / VTSB	2,032,042
48	Iloilo International Airport	Cabatuan, Iloilo, Western Visayas	Philippines	ILO / RPVI	1,943,719
49	Depati Amir Airport	Pangkal Pinang, Bangka Islands	Indonesia	PGK / WIPK	1,914,006
50	Laguindingan Airport	Moog, Laguindingan, Misamis Oriental, Mindanao	Philippines	CGY / RPMY	1,776,353
51	Ubon Ratchathani Airport	Nai-Mueang, Mueang Ubon, Ubon Ratchathani	Thailand	UBP / VTUU	1,726,061
52	Puerto Princesa International Airport	San Miguel, Puerto Princesa, Palawan	Philippines	PPS / RPVP	1,644,003
53	Sultan Thaha Syaifuddin Airport	Jambi City, Jambi	Indonesia	DJB / WIPA	1,639,873
54	Vinh International Airport	Vinh, Nghệ An, Bắc Trung Bộ	Vietnam	VII / VVVH	1,563,387

== See also ==
- List of the busiest airports in Asia
- Busiest airports by continent
- World's busiest airports by total passenger traffic (domestic and international)
- World's busiest airports by international passenger traffic
- World's busiest airports by aircraft movements
- World's busiest airports by cargo traffic
- World's busiest city airport systems by passenger traffic
