= List of largest cargo airports in the United States =

List of the largest cargo airports in the United States based on weight of landed cargo in US pounds (freight and mail) since 2008 (note: this list includes airports in U.S. territories).

Rank (2023)	Airports	IATA code	ICAO code	Major city served	State	2023	2022	2021	2020	2019	2018	2017	2016	2015	2014	2013	2012	2011	2010	2009	2008
1	Ted Stevens Anchorage International	ANC	PANC	Anchorage	AK	25,635,248,458	24,265,396,895	25,219,077,526	22,882,827,499	18,306,699,196	18,413,943,946	17,337,337,377	16,867,292,945	17,139,250,601	15,867,941,046	15,982,410,652	16,522,948,234	17,774,071,223	19,463,543,790	15,524,360,013	17,951,597,580
2	Memphis International	MEM	KMEM	Memphis	TN	22,952,291,210	23,402,185,775	24,867,472,042	25,156,876,655	24,344,504,836	24,432,753,510	23,949,525,780	23,866,469,898	22,679,195,919	22,774,592,279	21,891,425,638	20,983,699,672	20,303,149,106	19,544,635,833	18,928,729,202	19,500,093,674
3	Louisville Muhammad Ali International	SDF	KSDF	Louisville	KY	17,056,069,529	18,168,215,285	17,506,400,843	16,756,934,214	15,599,137,404	14,643,310,355	13,403,682,652	12,804,148,855	12,057,543,654	11,568,369,154	11,264,596,650	11,096,369,031	10,981,281,067	10,637,700,120	10,278,035,711	10,445,498,827
4	Miami International	MIA	KMIA	Miami	FL	11,466,632,402	10,667,545,448	11,283,672,121	9,929,929,001	9,235,113,239	8,398,363,905	7,963,988,407	7,899,307,235	7,630,761,702	7,192,790,882	6,847,177,300	7,147,983,325	6,634,448,852	6,905,291,871	6,352,786,009	6,988,513,672
5	Cincinnati/Northern Kentucky International	CVG	KCVG	Cincinnati	KY	10,719,702,928	9,236,796,404	8,478,266,612	8,209,931,440	7,238,728,106	7,031,104,454	5,700,282,994	4,275,662,532	4,019,745,706	3,644,404,568	3,422,731,214	3,188,275,844	2,819,377,048	2,431,870,514	1,127,694,335	207,350,722
6	Los Angeles International	LAX	KLAX	Los Angeles	CA	8,620,594,080	11,461,211,039	14,789,239,464	13,171,992,460	7,459,422,818	7,316,551,753	7,197,930,264	6,931,158,178	6,585,460,219	4,297,359,912	4,199,375,809	4,204,996,790	4,043,122,100	3,954,810,091	3,768,864,700	5,751,595,501
7	Chicago O'Hare International	ORD	KORD	Chicago	IL	7,259,899,848	7,840,745,746	8,590,863,840	7,877,649,208	6,543,510,230	6,697,030,276	10,373,559,593	9,358,755,022	9,063,649,529	7,541,411,779	6,864,249,348	4,555,097,891	4,368,420,500	4,895,940,100	3,499,701,350	4,206,916,900
8	Indianapolis International	IND	KIND	Indianapolis	IN	5,151,459,190	7,230,550,380	7,160,133,175	5,653,005,700	5,301,991,570	5,279,561,245	5,138,500,501	5,329,187,330	5,324,737,760	5,355,984,715	5,268,916,355	4,940,121,920	4,813,314,835	4,717,295,655	4,575,418,342	5,128,484,161
9	John F Kennedy International	JFK	KJFK	New York	NY	4,946,583,226	4,456,997,828	5,020,677,738	3,431,222,328	3,181,583,134	3,278,081,740	2,937,988,820	3,197,249,060	3,255,916,985	3,170,996,874	3,372,770,377	3,494,647,375	3,944,502,109	3,923,400,051	3,181,559,852	4,444,315,500
10	Ontario International	ONT	KONT	Ontario, Los Angeles	CA	4,561,798,355	5,203,676,097	5,344,522,774	5,220,302,257	4,491,470,174	4,198,558,563	3,522,510,318	3,041,697,142	2,588,841,276	2,360,845,923	2,371,732,316	2,361,837,263	2,313,849,963	2,241,182,912	2,336,057,158	2,699,776,864
11	Dallas-Fort Worth International	DFW	KDFW	Dallas, Fort Worth	TX	3,861,263,150	4,266,864,656	3,914,555,658	4,515,027,123	4,740,849,216	4,303,624,237	4,155,362,297	3,859,940,737	3,328,784,075	3,140,733,270	3,062,528,160	3,087,615,175	3,064,264,844	3,031,597,346	2,872,971,976	3,228,104,260
12	Hartsfield - Jackson Atlanta International	ATL	KATL	Atlanta	GA	3,355,488,476	3,356,099,476	3,650,738,103	3,165,690,474	3,107,206,086	2,992,813,629	2,781,647,652	2,610,022,106	2,458,665,543	2,262,892,910	2,187,228,002	2,027,932,736	2,655,614,700	2,628,040,410	2,555,242,350	2,334,922,810
13	Oakland International	OAK	KOAK	Oakland, San Francisco	CA	3,323,103,217	3,726,916,410	3,901,370,785	3,677,415,748	3,672,214,435	3,625,227,180	3,272,195,070	3,152,106,329	3,051,610,036	2,954,355,995	2,723,772,301	2,646,418,994	2,679,671,476	2,648,094,390	2,681,144,418	3,484,046,450
14	Daniel K Inouye International	HNL	PHNL	Honolulu	HI	3,113,505,000	3,220,717,400	3,348,874,100	3,430,615,600	2,827,977,600	2,746,649,400	2,487,185,900	2,456,197,000	2,264,820,700	2,189,120,700	2,116,335,200	1,976,862,300	2,113,941,200	2,123,084,700	2,041,210,900	2,064,028,654
15	Chicago/Rockford International	RFD	KRFD	Chicago, Rockford	IL	3,097,663,076	3,424,546,813	3,410,070,576	2,739,584,350	2,372,104,750	2,139,318,460	1,381,654,780	922,955,400	796,201,190	788,773,800	792,674,210	822,206,730	888,721,860	917,260,300	1,128,804,190	1,419,957,532
16	Seattle-Tacoma International	SEA	KSEA	Seattle, Tacoma	WA	2,746,134,200	2,745,015,570	2,920,048,979	2,715,552,788	2,479,689,983	2,465,313,646	2,315,645,598	1,878,916,576	1,570,011,793	1,574,603,394	1,386,358,331	1,290,550,381	1,357,043,620	1,394,058,765	1,606,699,377	1,493,544,435
17	Newark Liberty International	EWR	KEWR	New York, Newark	NJ	2,715,429,720	3,028,084,340	3,149,132,360	2,986,808,278	3,053,754,550	2,905,386,775	2,990,957,430	2,803,385,720	2,890,156,090	2,499,283,148	2,533,226,761	2,854,009,886	3,049,215,532	2,978,995,667	2,928,640,538	3,453,120,325
18	Philadelphia International	PHL	KPHL	Philadelphia	PA	2,710,953,610	3,251,579,720	3,248,882,680	3,148,398,964	2,819,643,174	2,450,565,660	2,017,190,422	2,027,769,604	1,901,255,804	1,927,756,545	1,884,230,897	1,883,576,381	1,949,469,667	1,987,519,867	2,263,373,275	2,527,521,975
19	George Bush Intercontinental/Houston	IAH	KIAH	Houston	TX	2,319,717,572	2,254,043,508	2,263,132,027	2,458,897,596	2,402,647,056	2,197,967,253	1,755,069,631	1,636,306,553	1,746,475,356	1,734,461,801	1,704,234,283	1,575,814,863	1,616,771,558	1,526,026,442	1,567,763,301	1,508,589,067
20	Perot Field/Fort Worth Alliance	AFW	KAFW	Dallas, Fort Worth	TX	2,045,607,541	2,524,145,434	2,416,564,940	1,662,707,397	1,015,138,360	922,593,845	904,874,371	897,408,852	775,382,804	667,945,474	636,920,725	634,122,590	898,583,721	700,934,744	597,945,014	898,471,054
21	Phoenix Sky Harbor International	PHX	KPHX	Phoenix	AZ	1,998,256,486	2,255,116,956	2,429,846,732	2,423,935,280	2,211,071,090	1,913,451,630	1,757,368,004	1,703,829,283	1,515,738,856	1,436,921,968	1,375,903,366	1,300,826,546	1,239,062,238	1,213,458,732	1,220,692,246	1,350,082,904
22	Portland International	PDX	KPDX	Portland	OR	1,996,852,405	2,383,881,608	2,373,895,508	2,143,216,982	2,021,064,767	1,688,704,279	1,471,945,867	1,271,073,678	1,169,146,438	1,126,448,683	1,137,027,109	1,161,531,992	1,134,697,344	1,062,285,290	1,089,318,211	1,312,346,006
23	Luis Muñoz Marín International	SJU	TJSJ	San Juan	PR	1,751,263,616	1,700,308,624	1,666,915,382	1,479,233,218	1,225,582,692	1,253,233,704	1,208,323,492	1,084,961,328	1,008,603,300	850,270,758	847,031,376	849,842,262	867,078,992	882,936,872	1,086,774,488	862,034,200
24	Denver International	DEN	KDEN	Denver	CO	1,595,144,224	1,806,450,290	1,832,675,444	1,827,472,290	1,644,980,890	1,491,627,380	1,391,967,269	1,425,420,956	1,363,477,626	1,314,752,910	1,259,729,786	1,204,617,700	1,209,106,208	1,237,718,352	1,248,170,052	1,249,801,900
25	San Bernardino International	SBD	KSBD	San Bernardino	CA	1,333,393,540	1,333,244,000	873,352,800	467,634,388	351,298,422	181,970,000	20,098,000	5,026,700	N/A	N/A	N/A	N/A	N/A	N/A	N/A	N/A
26	Baltimore/Washington International Thurgood Marshall	BWI	KBWI	Baltimore	MD	1,329,127,000	1,467,579,905	1,519,179,563	1,512,061,740	1,380,310,388	1,238,312,420	943,878,461	536,859,376	520,180,931	487,553,717	493,739,798	488,944,549	484,628,795	471,224,991	469,422,716	456,081,500
27	San Francisco International	SFO	KSFO	San Francisco	CA	1,130,957,000	1,155,243,550	1,312,670,650	1,245,566,300	1,027,286,000	1,078,254,350	1,254,393,000	1,300,957,350	1,280,669,776	1,245,416,930	1,191,012,764	1,197,193,176	1,243,832,338	1,304,432,000	1,494,163,650	1,549,361,900
28	Bradley International	BDL	KBDL	Hartford, Springfield	CT	1,052,126,820	1,259,617,920	1,228,028,070	1,214,517,070	1,261,389,600	961,967,800	817,966,700	831,343,300	797,334,070	783,504,420	773,858,840	728,576,156	750,158,976	730,317,638	763,441,994	865,786,122
29	Orlando International	MCO	KMCO	Orlando	FL	1,030,557,430	1,243,274,590	1,374,010,420	1,292,668,960	1,285,646,340	1,058,726,130	991,178,133	974,669,950	874,183,950	756,120,798	698,556,765	725,505,195	805,685,900	796,032,605	782,467,887	850,924,152
30	Salt Lake City International	SLC	KSLC	Salt Lake City	UT	1,023,418,894	1,266,129,413	1,330,935,291	1,337,308,784	1,202,014,908	1,198,354,639	1,123,668,279	1,083,725,861	1,035,206,088	962,293,488	934,455,550	876,163,077	856,301,628	848,125,292	898,534,081	1,042,505,101
31	General Edward Lawrence Logan International	BOS	KBOS	Boston	MA	997,226,500	1,165,047,900	1,288,581,050	1,197,590,350	1,024,501,330	1,008,332,010	996,320,950	980,954,950	893,960,700	910,283,225	866,698,830	780,913,850	806,845,332	817,235,460	835,954,035	984,258,400
32	Lakeland Linder International	LAL	KLAL	Lakeland	FL	903,293,000	856,905,000	738,778,000	203,390,000	N/A	N/A	N/A	N/A	N/A	N/A	N/A	N/A	N/A	N/A	N/A	N/A
33	Piedmont Triad International	GSO	KGSO	Greensboro, Winston-Salem	NC	893,335,705	1,068,046,105	1,156,085,147	752,587,537	934,817,197	688,034,735	607,083,703	498,972,502	548,015,962	535,652,851	605,622,410	605,933,879	608,006,690	611,844,976	558,148,546	463,403,755
34	Tampa International	TPA	KTPA	Tampa	FL	816,186,930	1,325,924,240	1,324,458,660	1,406,131,050	1,346,832,550	1,270,006,152	853,209,824	587,135,982	423,882,478	395,335,682	374,054,404	311,542,418	314,706,228	317,256,930	318,581,850	474,970,090
35	San Antonio International	SAT	KSAT	San Antonio	TX	786,693,470	914,276,002	891,732,300	933,425,120	960,470,460	922,751,860	844,767,966	791,990,700	775,121,718	746,704,930	737,330,634	809,391,614	748,533,304	674,796,388	671,660,636	823,130,548
36	Laredo International	LRD	KLRD	Laredo	TX	775,220,231	808,464,069	630,306,259	403,806,379	510,745,208	674,265,689	587,517,683	450,435,440	3,328,784,075	3,140,733,270	3,062,528,160	3,087,615,175	3,064,264,844	3,031,597,346	2,872,971,976	3,228,104,260
37	El Paso International	ELP	KELP	El Paso	TX	768,400,616	777,989,264	754,170,132	719,310,424	631,241,500	700,728,342	525,102,662	510,464,050	518,866,006	497,118,706	480,568,188	554,800,910	533,568,718	528,987,300	391,440,080	447,841,040
38	Charlotte/Douglas International	CLT	KCLT	Charlotte	NC	727,748,760	811,152,970	785,516,250	784,913,564	783,608,701	643,432,226	604,310,880	467,253,040	378,541,098	360,077,450	353,447,052	349,852,877	397,863,057	404,452,776	391,159,184	472,818,113
39	Minneapolis-St Paul International/Wold-Chamberlain	MSP	KMSP	Minneapolis, ST Paul	MN	725,187,225	1,139,128,948	1,149,929,379	1,102,871,589	1,116,038,674	1,080,882,463	1,030,776,385	1,002,366,375	985,229,001	972,664,080	732,663,072	875,841,084	968,650,986	1,024,128,613	948,064,510	1,123,477,820
40	Austin-Bergstrom International	AUS	KAUS	Austin	TX	704,802,540	796,254,474	684,479,790	607,956,455	542,289,311	535,788,440	547,734,473	483,753,210	498,446,900	438,339,730	442,476,680	420,478,700	416,029,448	398,073,978	398,927,244	591,466,066
41	Kansas City International	MCI	KMCI	Kansas City	MO	701,661,790	736,857,188	695,201,560	595,447,328	576,393,776	569,678,364	571,041,998	616,946,618	503,007,188	497,633,875	487,687,191	427,136,299	423,890,310	431,918,705	455,152,003	588,239,556
42	Detroit Metro Wayne County	DTW	KDTW	Detroit	MI	699,372,836	885,466,078	947,101,222	888,306,650	893,741,120	843,725,711	789,037,070	779,475,670	685,952,990	674,728,030	682,197,220	666,139,040	602,804,150	552,232,440	584,958,610	707,516,080
43	Rickenbacker International	LCK	KLCK	Columbus	OH	683,221,199	1,024,152,504	1,450,387,773	1,186,394,661	1,230,804,387	1,230,669,536	1,085,726,304	983,247,285	920,417,207	734,846,781	695,589,751	694,785,131	653,902,306	683,430,047	646,330,758	730,520,067
44	Lehigh Valley International	ABE	KABE	Allentown	PA	680,234,950	642,827,000	651,975,388	574,400,694	646,098,750	680,920,840	689,003,342	387,362,976	1,901,255,804	1,927,756,545	1,884,230,897	1,883,576,381	1,949,469,667	1,987,519,867	2,263,373,275	2,527,521,975
45	Raleigh-Durham International	RDU	KRDU	Raleigh, Durham	NC	620.666.155	734,185,480	735,931,665	631,531,300	556,958,795	502,913,495	502,693,290	452,516,590	446,121,017	439,980,600	409,473,228	381,945,455	430,409,120	460,397,905	436,497,214	495,151,968
46	Boeing Field/King County International	BFI	KBFI	Seattle	WA	601,203,215	642,200,872	693,696,765	714,618,694	754,068,467	744,964,183	745,346,446	793,142,903	833,475,382	815,258,980	759,444,826	791,928,576	909,809,432	906,716,494	894,664,512	835,114,481
47	Reno/Tahoe International	RNO	KRNO	Reno	NV	576,130,140	651,498,150	659,346,790	618,645,604	640,272,432	541,107,720	553,310,545	612,740,180	511,550,100	467,324,320	428,698,250	437,385,520	371,917,840	350,867,572	335,243,304	468,044,360
48	Pittsburgh International	PIT	KPIT	Pittsburgh	PA	549,182,598	687,478,361	812,896,728	547,841,586	551,295,276	559,718,442	470,107,335	452,232,238	432,456,881	405,850,757	398,016,924	394,796,125	411,883,369	420,863,410	395,448,025	490,738,810
49	San Diego International	SAN	KSAN	San Diego	CA	512,590,950	648,760,250	693,765,850	673,630,370	613,068,450	604,774,200	635,220,350	640,294,600	611,257,000	586,689,250	678,012,288	682,919,800	650,313,950	630,150,500	637,289,000	666,907,600
50	Nashville International	BNA	KBNA	Nashville	TN	396,489,600	654,343,291	474,760,550	286,833,754	293,372,671	308,460,114	292,444,384	284,476,598	313,285,771	298,160,483	296,237,996	233,138,746	261,516,890	243,700,794	355,766,290	469,983,650

== See also ==
- List of busiest airports in the world by cargo traffic
- List of the busiest airports
- List of busiest airports by passenger traffic
