= List of the busiest airports in Taiwan =

The tables below contains data published by the Civil Aeronautics Administration on the busiest airports in Taiwan by total passenger traffic.

== 2019 statistics ==
The 17 airports in Taiwan in 2019 ordered by total passenger traffic, according to statistics of Taiwan Civil Aeronautics Administration.。

Rank	Name	City served	IATA/ICAO	Passengers	Cargo(ton)	Aircraft
1.	Taiwan Taoyuan International Airport	Taoyuan / New Taipei / Taipei / Hsinchu	TPE/RCTP	48,689,372	2,182,341.8	265,625
2.	Kaohsiung International Airport	Kaohsiung / Pingtung	KHH/RCKH	7,506,753	64,676.8	64,015
3.	Taipei Songshan Airport	Taipei / New Taipei / Keelung	TSA/RCSS	6,350,353	47,800.4	62,951
4.	Taichung International Airport	Taichung / Changhua	RMQ/RCMQ	2,821,967	3,728.9	33,694
5.	Penghu Airport	Penghu	MZG/RCQC	2,743,876	5,970.2	44,728
6.	Kinmen Airport	Kinmen	KNH/RCBS	2,543,492	7,175.5	35,008
7.	Tainan Airport	Tainan	TNN/RCNN	469,338	789.3	6,443
8.	Taitung Airport	Taitung	TTT/RCFN	332,221	242.2	48,388
9.	Matsu Nangan Airport	Nangan, Lienchiang	LZN/RCFG	311,653	1,350.5	5,020
10.	Hualien Airport	Hualien	HUN/RCYU	118,152	160.1	4,374
11.	Matsu Beigan Airport	Beigan, Lienchiang	MFK/RCMT	90,350	386.1	1,865
12.	Chiayi Airport	Chiayi / Taibao	CYI/RCKU	85,123	186.1	1,479
13.	Lanyu Airport	Lanyu, Taitung	KYD/RCLY	46,155	37.3	3,122
14.	Lyudao Airport	Lyudao, Taitung	GNI/RCGI	28,809	28.0	2,888
15.	Qimei Airport	Cimei, Penghu	CMJ/RCCM	18,373	7.7	1,734
16.	Wang-an Airport	Wangan, Penghu	WOT/RCWA	1,462	0.4	174
17.	Hengchun Airport	Hengchun, Pingtung	HCN/RCKW	0	0	0

== 2018 statistics ==
The 17 airports in Taiwan in 2018 ordered by total passenger traffic, according to statistics of Taiwan Civil Aeronautics Administration.。

Rank	Name	City served	IATA/ICAO	Passengers	Cargo(ton)	Aircraft
1.	Taiwan Taoyuan International Airport	Taoyuan / New Taipei / Taipei / Hsinchu	TPE/RCTP	46,535,180	2,322,820.0	256,069
2.	Kaohsiung International Airport	Kaohsiung / Pingtung	KHH/RCKH	6,973,845	73,541.6	60,155
3.	Taipei Songshan Airport	Taipei / New Taipei / Keelung	TSA/RCSS	6,225,932	47,132.9	58,056
4.	Taichung International Airport	Taichung / Changhua	RMQ/RCMQ	2,638,774	3,757.1	30,838
5.	Penghu Airport	Penghu	MZG/RCQC	2,528,820	6,182.7	38,958
6.	Kinmen Airport	Kinmen	KNH/RCBS	2,429,828	6,778.1	32,874
7.	Tainan Airport	Tainan	TNN/RCNN	475,844	757.6	6,367
8.	Taitung Airport	Taitung	TTT/RCFN	327,107	241.4	42,857
9.	Matsu Nangan Airport	Nangan, Lienchiang	LZN/RCFG	303,931	1,330.7	5,089
10.	Hualien Airport	Hualien	HUN/RCYU	192,900	156.8	4,193
11.	Matsu Beigan Airport	Beigan, Lienchiang	MFK/RCMT	92,203	374.1	2,018
12.	Chiayi Airport	Chiayi / Taibao	CYI/RCKU	83,032	189.6	1,483
13.	Lanyu Airport	Lanyu, Taitung	KYD/RCLY	49,617	41.5	3,316
14.	Lyudao Airport	Lyudao, Taitung	GNI/RCGI	25,871	27.4	2,702
15.	Qimei Airport	Cimei, Penghu	CMJ/RCCM	19,723	4.2	1,990
16.	Wang-an Airport	Wangan, Penghu	WOT/RCWA	1,524	0	186
17.	Hengchun Airport	Hengchun, Pingtung	HCN/RCKW	0	0	42

== 2016 statistics ==
The 17 airports in Taiwan in 2016 ordered by total passenger traffic, according to statistics of Taiwan Civil Aeronautics Administration.。

Rank	Name	City	IATA/ICAO	Passengers	Cargo(ton)	Aircraft
1.	Taoyuan International Airport	Taoyuan	TPE/RCTP	42,296,322	2,097,228.4	244,464
2.	Kaohsiung International Airport	Kaohsiung	KHH/RCKH	6,416,681	71,447.8	57,446
3.	Taipei Songshan Airport	Taipei	TSA/RCSS	6,143,445	43,640.7	59,351
4.	Taichung International Airport	Taichung	RMQ/RCMQ	2,380,116	3,807.5	25,945
5.	Kinmen Airport	Kinmen	KNH/RCBS	2,339,710	7,326.9	32,994
6.	Magong Airport	Penghu	MZG/RCQC	2,320,249	6,060.9	35,682
7.	Tainan Airport	Tainan	TNN/RCNN	367,124	681.8	6,081
8.	Taitung Airport	Taitung	TTT/RCFN	300,432	283.8	43,984
9.	Matsu Nangan Airport	Lienchiang	LZN/RCFG	259,289	1,496.0	4,567
10.	Hualien Airport	Hualien	HUN/RCYU	184,347	288.5	5,599
11.	Matsu Beigan Airport	Lienchiang	MFK/RCMT	79,850	515.0	1,925
12.	Chiayi Airport	Chiayi	CYI/RCKU	78,826	148.5	1,520
13.	Lanyu Airport	Taitung	KYD/RCLY	47,406	52.6	2,966
14.	Lyudao Airport	Taitung	GNI/RCGI	21,890	31.6	2,895
15.	Qimei Airport	Penghu	CMJ/RCCM	16,074	7.0	1,464
16.	Wang-an Airport	Penghu	WOT/RCWA	1,268	0	142
17.	Hengchun Airport	Pingtung	HCN/RCKW	0	0	0
