= List of airports in Northern Cyprus =

This is a list of airports in Northern Cyprus.

== Airports ==
Airport names shown in bold indicate the airport has scheduled service on commercial airlines.

Location	ICAO	IATA	Airport name
International airports
Nicosia	LCEN	ECN	**Ercan International Airport**
Famagusta	LCGK	GEC	**Geçitkale Airport**
Military airports
Nicosia Gonyeli			İlker Karter Air Base

== See also ==
- Transport in Northern Cyprus
- List of airports in Cyprus
- List of airports by ICAO code: L#LC – Cyprus
