= List of countries by airline passengers =

air passengers carried

The following list sorts countries by the number of passengers transported by airlines that are registered in the respective country according to data from the World Bank.

Country	Airline passengers carried	Year
United States	941,557,000	2023
China	619,215,886	2023
Ireland (Note: Note that this figure is inflated by Ryanair, an Irish-registered airline that served 169 million passengers in 2023, mostly on non-Irish routes. The six main airports of Ireland only served 39 million passengers in 2023.)	192,528,432	2023
India	180,415,784	2023
Turkey	125,940,241	2023
Japan	120,305,972	2023
United Kingdom	118,945,920	2023
Russia	98,872,628	2023
Indonesia	97,045,785	2023
Brazil	95,398,485	2023
Spain	94,101,520	2023
United Arab Emirates	91,062,293	2023
Canada	88,618,000	2023
Germany	80,199,572	2023
Mexico	78,763,320	2023
South Korea	76,272,454	2023
Australia	68,958,577	2023
France	64,644,716	2023
Hungary	55,613,579	2023
Vietnam	55,114,832	2023
Thailand	51,920,692	2023
Saudi Arabia	47,979,994	2023
Singapore	47,502,834	2023
Malaysia	46,698,381	2023
Austria	46,040,215	2023
Colombia	42,399,044	2023
Philippines	41,501,834	2023
Netherlands	41,436,802	2023
Qatar	37,714,348	2023
Switzerland	27,725,233	2023
Hong Kong	25,704,485	2023
Chile	21,323,388	2023
Argentina	21,057,811	2023
Italy	20,264,734	2023
Sweden	19,554,551	2023
Greece	19,090,513	2023
Portugal	18,288,977	2023
Iran	18,067,403	2023
Peru	17,717,403	2023
Egypt	16,672,111	2023
Panama	15,750,293	2023
South Africa	15,454,596	2023
Ethiopia	15,273,254	2023
New Zealand	15,033,155	2023
Norway	12,277,222	2004
Kazakhstan	11,884,241	2023
Belgium	11,390,665	2023
Finland	10,794,518	2023
Kuwait	9,499,895	2023
Morocco	9,354,197	2023
Poland	8,782,362	2023
Oman	8,697,025	2023
Israel	7,377,778	2023
Algeria	7,160,662	2023
Pakistan	7,153,419	2023
Bangladesh	6,628,497	2023
Denmark	6,428,701	2004
Bahrain	5,734,420	2023
Bolivia	5,601,302	2023
Nigeria	5,269,404	2023
Kenya	5,138,290	2023
Uzbekistan	4,849,939	2023
Ecuador	4,567,423	2023
Latvia	4,475,904	2023
Iceland	4,342,331	2023
Nepal	4,289,298	2023
Tunisia	4,110,265	2023
Serbia	3,868,570	2023
Sri Lanka	3,866,001	2023
Iraq	3,756,178	2023
Jordan	3,731,345	2023
Myanmar	3,541,244	2023
El Salvador	3,263,923	2023
Romania	2,806,654	2023
Lebanon	2,693,218	2023
Azerbaijan	2,581,841	2023
Luxembourg	2,457,683	2023
Malta	2,387,400	2023
Czech Republic	2,175,763	2023
Togo	2,175,165	2023
Fiji	2,154,560	2023
Macau	2,053,176	2023
Trinidad and Tobago	2,028,649	2023
Costa Rica	1,971,057	2023
Tanzania	1,911,063	2023
Venezuela	1,783,667	2023
Croatia	1,670,012	2023
Papua New Guinea	1,547,502	2023
Rwanda	1,537,008	2023
Mauritius	1,504,656	2023
Bahamas	1,465,432	2023
Maldives	1,414,194	2023
Belarus	1,322,490	2023
Angola	1,321,412	2023
Armenia	1,311,506	2023
Guam	1,172,372	2009
Democratic Republic of the Congo	1,150,170	2023
Libya	1,094,579	2023
Turkmenistan	1,078,118	2023
Senegal	1,070,961	2023
Afghanistan	1,031,379	2023
Dominican Republic	996,238	2023
Sudan	911,090	2023
Laos	842,280	2023
Moldova	827,604	2023
Brunei	820,886	2023
Kyrgyzstan	804,478	2023
Belize	776,198	2023
Mongolia	773,702	2023
Cyprus	724,062	2023
Bulgaria	723,825	2023
Ivory Coast	716,233	2023
Tajikistan	690,677	2023
Mozambique	680,108	2023
Cambodia	675,283	2023
Yemen	618,613	2023
Syria	610,745	2023
Uruguay	563,632	2009
Ukraine	452,344	2022
Ghana	440,680	2023
Honduras	428,443	2023
Paraguay	407,865	2023
Montenegro	379,068	2023
Albania	374,800	2023
Vanuatu	359,290	2023
Cameroon	331,025	2023
Mauritania	328,992	2023
Zambia	321,739	2023
Georgia	320,810	2023
Madagascar	313,313	2023
Aruba	274,280	2018
Seychelles	236,917	2023
Guatemala	221,478	2023
Bhutan	189,878	2023
Jamaica	180,951	2018
Botswana	172,720	2023
Solomon Islands	157,418	2023
Suriname	149,672	2023
Republic of the Congo	147,084	2023
Cuba	136,998	2023
Djibouti	130,500	1991
Equatorial Guinea	118,427	2023
Gambia	109,542	2019
Burkina Faso	103,592	2023
Zimbabwe	92,494	2023
North Macedonia	86,868	2009
Gabon	77,320	2016
American Samoa	76,944	2014
Tonga	75,416	2004
Haiti	74,542	2023
Cape Verde	71,784	2023
Nicaragua	61,031	2000
Namibia	60,304	2023
Kiribati	58,879	2023
Guinea	58,500	1999
Sierra Leone	50,193	2012
Central African Republic	46,364	2001
Eritrea	45,104	2020
Samoa	42,120	2023
Nauru	39,104	2023
São Tomé and Príncipe	38,767	2023
Antigua and Barbuda	35,515	2022
Eswatini	34,663	2023
Somalia	34,066	2019
Mali	33,444	2013
Liberia	32,000	1992
Marshall Islands	29,502	2023
Lithuania	29,256	2022
Chad	28,332	2014
Comoros	27,300	1996
Uganda	21,650	2023
Guinea-Bissau	20,400	1998
Barbados	17,000	1987
Burundi	12,000	1998
Guyana	7,512	2021
Niger	5,775	2023
North Korea	3,690	2023
Malawi	3,507	2023
Slovakia	1,925	2022
Slovenia	1,866	2022
Bosnia and Herzegovina	1,593	2020
Lesotho	1,300	1999
Benin	899	2016
Estonia	857	2019
Monaco	316	2019
