= List of the busiest airports in Asia =

This is a list of the 50 busiest airports in Asia, ranked by total passengers per year, which includes arrival, departure, and transit passengers. The tables also show the percentage change in total passenger traffic over last year. Asian airports are those that are located in the 48 countries and 6 dependent states as defined by UN and fall within the Asian region.

The busiest airport in Asia since 2023 is Dubai International Airport. As of 2024, China has twenty-two airports in the top 50, with an additional airport in Hong Kong; Japan has five; India has four; Indonesia, Saudi Arabia, South Korea, Thailand, Turkey (Asian part), and UAE represented by two airports; Malaysia, Philippines, Qatar, Singapore, Taiwan, and Vietnam have one each.

Top 30 busiest airports in 2024

== 2025 statistics ==
Rank	Airport	City	Country	Code (IATA)	Code (ICAO)	Total passengers	Rank change	% change
1.	(United Arab Emirates) Dubai International Airport	Dubai	United Arab Emirates	DXB	OMDB	95,200,000	Steady	▲3.1%
2.	(Japan) Tokyo Haneda Airport	Tokyo	Japan	HND	RJTT	91,430,000	Steady	▲6.7%
3.	(China) Shanghai Pudong International Airport	Shanghai	China	PVG	ZSPD	84,939,600	▲1	▲10.6%
4.	(China) Guangzhou Baiyun International Airport	Guangzhou	China	CAN	ZGGG	83,587,749	▲1	▲9.5%
5.	(India) Indira Gandhi International Airport	Delhi	India	DEL	VIDP	78,000,000	▼2	▲0.2%
6.	(South Korea) Seoul Incheon International Airport	Seoul	South Korea	ICN	RKSI	74,071,475	Steady	▲4.1%
7.	(China) Beijing Capital International Airport	Beijing	China	PEK	ZBAA	70,744,000	▲1	▲7.5%
8.	Singapore Changi Airport	Singapore	Singapore	SIN	WSSS	69,980,000	▼1	▲3.4%
9.	(China) Shenzhen Bao'an International Airport	Shenzhen	China	SZX	ZGSZ	66,000,000	Steady	▲7.4%
10.	(Malaysia) Kuala Lumpur International Airport	Kuala Lumpur	Malaysia	KUL	WMKK	63,300,000	▲1	▲11.0%
11.	(Thailand) Suvarnabhumi Airport	Samut Prakan	Thailand	BKK	VTBS	62,902,183	▼1	▲1.1%
12.	Hong Kong International Airport	Hong Kong	China	HKG	VHHH	60,992,000	▲3	▲14.9%
13.	(China) Chengdu Tianfu International Airport	Chengdu	China	TFU	ZUTF	56,680,000	▼1	▲3.2%
14.	(India) Chhatrapati Shivaji Maharaj International Airport	Mumbai	India	BOM	VABB	55,500,000	Steady	▲1.3%
15.	(Indonesia) Soekarno–Hatta International Airport	Jakarta	Indonesia	CGK	WIII	54,950,000	▼1	TBU
16.	(Qatar) Hamad International Airport	Doha	Qatar	DOH	OTHH	54,300,000	Steady	▲3.0%
17.	(China) Beijing Daxing International Airport	Beijing	China	PKX	ZBAD	53,618,949	▲1	▲8.45%
18.	(Saudi Arabia) King Abdulaziz International Airport	Jeddah	Saudi Arabia	JED	OEJN	53,400,000	▲1	▲8.8%
19.	(Philippines) Ninoy Aquino International Airport	Manila	Philippines	MNL	RPLL	52,020,000	▼2	▲3.8%
20.	(China) Hangzhou Xiaoshan International Airport	Hangzhou	China	HGH	ZSHC	50,459,018	▲1	▲5%
21.	(China) Shanghai Hongqiao International Airport	Shanghai	China	SHA	ZSSS	50,151,025	▲1	▲4.6%
22.	(China) Chongqing Jiangbei International Airport	Chongqing	China	CKG	ZUCK	50,094,770	▼2	▲2.8%
23.	(China) Kunming Changshui International Airport	Kunming	China	KMG	ZPPP	49,690,000	Steady	▲5.4%
24.	(China) Xi'an Xianyang International Airport	Xi'an	China	XIY	ZLXY	48,535,594	Steady	▲3.2%
25.	(Taiwan) Taoyuan International Airport	Taipei	Taiwan	TPE	RCTP	TBU	Steady	TBU
26.	(Turkey) Sabiha Gökçen International Airport	Istanbul	Turkey	SAW	LTFJ	48,420,757	▲1	▲16.8%
27.	(India) Kempegowda International Airport	Bangalore	India	BLR	VOBL	43,820,000	▼1	▲7.6%
28.	(Japan) Narita Airport	Tokyo	Japan	NRT	RJAA	42,255,291	Steady	▲6.1%
29.	(Vietnam) Tan Son Nhat International Airport	Ho Chi Minh City	Vietnam	SGN	VVTS	TBU	Steady	TBU
30.	(Turkey) Antalya Airport	Antalya	Turkey	AYT	LTAI	39,160,491	Steady	▲2.7%
31.	(Saudi Arabia) King Khalid International Airport	Riyadh	Saudi Arabia	RUH	OERK	TBU	Steady	TBU
32.	(China) Chengdu Shuangliu International Airport	Chengdu	China	CTU	ZUUU	33,518,945	Steady	▲3.36%
33.	(China) Nanjing Lukou International Airport	Nanjing	China	NKG	ZSNJ	31,378,166	▲2	▲0.64%
34.	(China) Wuhan Tianhe International Airport	Wuhan	China	WUH	ZHHH	31,339,277	▼1	▼0.21%
35.	(China) Changsha Huanghua International Airport	Changsha	China	CSX	ZGHA	30,253,675	▼1	▼3.09%
36.	(Japan) Kansai International Airport	Osaka	Japan	KIX	RJBB	34,096,882	Steady	▲11.2%
37.	(United Arab Emirates) Zayed International Airport	Abu Dhabi	United Arab Emirates	AUH	OMAA	33,000,000	▲3	▲12.2%
38.	(Thailand) Don Mueang International Airport	Bangkok	Thailand	DMK	VTBD	31,650,816	▼1	▲3.8%
39.	(Vietnam) Noi Bai International Airport	Hanoi	Vietnam	HAN	VVNB	TBU	▼1	TBU
40.	(South Korea) Jeju International Airport	Jeju City	South Korea	CJU	RKPC	TBU	▼1	TBU
41.	(China) Zhengzhou Xinzheng International Airport	Zhengzhou	China	CGO	ZHCC	TBU	Steady	TBU
42.	(China) Xiamen Gaoqi International Airport	Xiamen	China	XMN	ZSAM	TBU	Steady	TBU
43.	(India) Rajiv Gandhi International Airport	Hyderabad	India	HYD	VOHS	TBU	Steady	TBU
44.	(China) Ürümqi Tianshan International Airport	Ürümqi	China	URC	ZWWW	TBU	Steady	TBU
45.	(Japan) Fukuoka Airport	Fukuoka	Japan	FUK	RJFF	TBU	Steady	TBU
46.	(China) Haikou Meilan International Airport	Haikou	China	HAK	ZJHK	TBU	Steady	TBU
47.	(China) Qingdao Jiaodong International Airport	Qingdao	China	TAO	ZSQD	TBU	Steady	TBU
48.	(Indonesia) Ngurah Rai International Airport	Denpasar	Indonesia	DPS	WADD	TBU	Steady	TBU
49.	(China) Harbin Taiping International Airport	Harbin	China	HRB	ZYHB	TBU	Steady	TBU
50.	(China) Shenyang Taoxian International Airport	Shenyang	China	SHE	ZYTX	TBU	Steady	TBU

== 2024 statistics ==
Rank	Airport	City	Country	Code (IATA)	Code (ICAO)	Total passengers	Rank change	% change
1.	(United Arab Emirates) Dubai International Airport	Dubai	United Arab Emirates	DXB	OMDB	92,300,000	Steady	▲6.2%
2.	(Japan) Tokyo Haneda Airport	Tokyo	Japan	HND	RJTT	85,000,000	Steady	▲8.0%
3.	(India) Indira Gandhi International Airport	Delhi	India	DEL	VIDP	77,820,834	Steady	▲7.8%
4.	(China) Shanghai Pudong International Airport	Shanghai	China	PVG	ZSPD	76,798,000	▲4	▲41.0%
5.	(China) Guangzhou Baiyun International Airport	Guangzhou	China	CAN	ZGGG	76,345,000	▼1	▲20.9%
6.	(South Korea) Seoul Incheon International Airport	Seoul	South Korea	ICN	RKSI	71,156,947	Steady	▲26.7%
7.	Singapore Changi Airport	Singapore	Singapore	SIN	WSSS	67,700,000	▼2	▲14.8%
8.	(China) Beijing Capital International Airport	Beijing	China	PEK	ZBAA	67,380,000	Steady	▲27.4%
9.	(China) Shenzhen Bao'an International Airport	Shenzhen	China	SZX	ZGSZ	61,480,000	Steady	▲16.6%
10.	(Thailand) Suvarnabhumi Airport	Samut Prakan	Thailand	BKK	VTBS	59,999,324	Steady	▲16.1%
11.	(Malaysia) Kuala Lumpur International Airport	Kuala Lumpur	Malaysia	KUL	WMKK	57,044,869	▲2	▲20.7%
12.	(China) Chengdu Tianfu International Airport	Chengdu	China	TFU	ZUTF	54,890,000	▲4	▲22.6%
13.	(Indonesia) Soekarno–Hatta International Airport	Jakarta	Indonesia	CGK	WIII	54,809,500	▼1	▲11.7.%
14.	(India) Chhatrapati Shivaji Maharaj International Airport	Mumbai	India	BOM	VABB	54,800,000	▼3	▲6.3%
15.	Hong Kong International Airport	Hong Kong	China	HKG	VHHH	53,100,000	▲9	▲34.3%
16.	(Qatar) Hamad International Airport	Doha	Qatar	DOH	OTHH	52,700,000	▼2	▲14.8%
17.	(Philippines) Ninoy Aquino International Airport	Manila	Philippines	MNL	RPLL	50,100,000	▼2	▲10.4%
18.	(China) Beijing Daxing International Airport	Beijing	China	PKX	ZBAD	49,430,000	▲7	▲25.4%
19.	(Saudi Arabia) King Abdulaziz International Airport	Jeddah	Saudi Arabia	JED	OEJN	49,100,000	▼1	▲15.0%
20.	(China) Chongqing Jiangbei International Airport	Chongqing	China	CKG	ZUCK	48,660,000	▼3	▲9.0%
21.	(China) Hangzhou Xiaoshan International Airport	Hangzhou	China	HGH	ZSHC	48,050,000	▲1	▲16.7%
22.	(China) Shanghai Hongqiao International Airport	Shanghai	China	SHA	ZSSS|	47,970,000	▼3	▲12.9%
23.	(China) Kunming Changshui International Airport	Kunming	China	KMG	ZPPP	47,140,000	▼3	▲12.1%
24.	(China) Xi'an Xianyang International Airport	Xi'an	China	XIY	ZLXY	47,030,000	▼3	▲13.7%
25.	(Taiwan) Taoyuan International Airport	Taipei	Taiwan	TPE	RCTP	44,921,996	▲4	▲27.1%
26.	(India) Kempegowda International Airport	Bangalore	India	BLR	VOBL	41,875,620	Steady	▲11.6%
27.	(Turkey) Istanbul Sabiha Gökçen International Airport	Istanbul	Turkey	SAW	LTFJ	41,449,044	Steady	▲13.0%
28.	(Japan) Narita Airport	Tokyo	Japan	NRT	RJAA	39,807,651	New entry	▲21.7%
29.	(Vietnam) Tan Son Nhat International Airport	Ho Chi Minh City	Vietnam	SGN	VVTS	39,800,000	▼6	▼2.3%
30.	(Turkey) Antalya Airport	Antalya	Turkey	AYT	LTAI	38,133,273	▼2	▲7.3%
31.	(Saudi Arabia) King Khalid International Airport	Riyadh	Saudi Arabia	RUH	OERK	37,200,000	New entry	▲17.8%
32.	(China) Chengdu Shuangliu International Airport	Chengdu	China	CTU	ZUUU	32,500,000	New entry	▲7.8%
33.	(China) Wuhan Tianhe International Airport	Wuhan	China	WUH	ZHHH	31,410,000	New entry	▲21.5%
34.	(China) Changsha Huanghua International Airport	Changsha	China	CSX	ZGHA	31,280,000	New entry	▲14.8%
35.	(China) Nanjing Lukou International Airport	Nanjing	China	NKG	ZSNJ	31,230,000	New entry	▲14.2%
36.	(Japan) Kansai International Airport	Osaka	Japan	KIX	RJBB	30,643,513	New entry	▲18.4%
37.	(Thailand) Don Mueang International Airport	Bangkok	Thailand	DMK	VTBD	30,490,635	New entry	▲13.3%
38.	(Vietnam) Noi Bai International Airport	Hanoi	Vietnam	HAN	VVNB	30,000,000	New entry	▲2.0%
39.	(South Korea) Jeju International Airport	Jeju City	South Korea	CJU	RKPC	29,619,606	New entry	▲1.8%
40.	(United Arab Emirates) Zayed International Airport	Abu Dhabi	United Arab Emirates	AUH	OMAA	29,400,000	New entry	▲12.8%
41.	(China) Zhengzhou Xinzheng International Airport	Zhengzhou	China	CGO	ZHCC	28,570,202	New entry	▲12.4%
42.	(China) Xiamen Gaoqi International Airport	Xiamen	China	XMN	ZSAM	27,990,000	New entry	▲15.8%
43.	(India) Rajiv Gandhi International Airport	Hyderabad	India	HYD	VOHS	27,873,202	New entry	▲14.8%
44.	(China) Ürümqi Tianshan International Airport	Ürümqi	China	URC	ZWWW	27,770,000	New entry	▲10.7%
45.	(Japan) Fukuoka Airport	Fukuoka	Japan	FUK	RJFF	26,800,000	New entry	▲TBU
46.	(China) Haikou Meilan International Airport	Haikou	China	HAK	ZJHK	26,890,000	New entry	▲10.5%
47.	(China) Qingdao Jiaodong International Airport	Qingdao	China	TAO	ZSQD	26,180,000	New entry	▲22.2%
48.	(Indonesia) Ngurah Rai International Airport	Denpasar	Indonesia	DPS	WADD	23,900,000	New entry	▲11.7%
49.	(China) Harbin Taiping International Airport	Harbin	China	HRB	ZYHB	23,800,000	New entry	▲14.4%
50.	(China) Shenyang Taoxian International Airport	Shenyang	China	SHE	ZYTX	23,730,000	New entry	▲15.5%

== 2023 statistics ==
Source: 2023 report from the Port Authority of New York and New Jersey

Rank	Airport	City	Country/Territory	Code (IATA)	Code (ICAO)	Total passengers	% change from 2022
1	(United Arab Emirates) Dubai International Airport	Dubai	United Arab Emirates	DXB	OMDB	86,994,365	31.7%
2	(Japan) Tokyo-Haneda International Airport	Tokyo	Japan	HND	RJTT	78,719,302	55.1%
3	(India) Indira Gandhi International Airport	Delhi	India	DEL	VIDP	72,214,841	21.4%
4	(China) Guangzhou Baiyun International Airport	Guangzhou	China	CAN	ZGGG	63,169,169	142.0%
5	Singapore Changi Airport	Singapore	Singapore	SIN	WSSS	58,946,000	83.1%
6	(South Korea) Incheon International Airport	Seoul/Incheon	Republic of Korea	ICN	RKSI	56,235,412	213.8%
7	(China) Shanghai Pudong International Airport	Shanghai	China	PVG	ZSPD	54,476,397	284.2%
8	(China) Beijing Capital International Airport	Beijing	China	PEK	ZBAA	52,879,156	316.2%
9	(China) Shenzhen Bao'an International Airport	Shenzhen	China	SZX	ZGSZ	52,734,934	144.6%
10	(Thailand) Suvarnabhumi Airport	Samut Prakan	Thailand	BKK	VTBS	51,699,104	79.8%
11	(India) Chhatrapati Shivaji Maharaj International Airport	Mumbai	India	BOM	VABB	51,589,040	34.6%
12	(Indonesia) Soekarno–Hatta International Airport	Jakarta/Tangerang	Indonesia	CGK	WIII	49,080,532	23.9%
13	(Malaysia) Kuala Lumpur International Airport	Kuala Lumpur/Sepang	Malaysia	KUL	WMKK	47,242,468	86.0%
14	(Qatar) Hamad International Airport	Doha	Qatar	DOH	OTHH	45,916,098	28.5%
15	(Philippines) Ninoy Aquino International Airport	Manila	Philippines	MNL	RPLL	45,300,322	46.7%
16	(China) Chengdu Tianfu International Airport	Chengdu	China	TFU	ZUTF	44,786,032	237.4%
17	(China) Chongqing Jiangbei International Airport	Chongqing	China	CKG	ZUCK	44,657,268	106.1%
18	(Saudi Arabia) King Abdulaziz International Airport	Jeddah	Saudi Arabia	JED	OEJN	42,910,407	35.7%
19	(China) Shanghai Hongqiao International Airport	Shanghai	China	SHA	ZSSS	42,492,745	188.8%
20	(China) Kunming Changshui International Airport	Kunming	China	KMG	ZPPP	42,053,214	97.4%
21	(China) Xi'an Xianyang International Airport	Xi'an/Xianyang	China	XIY	ZLXY	41,371,228	205.1%
22	(China) Hangzhou Xiaoshan International Airport	Hangzhou	China	HGH	ZSHC	41,170,470	105.5%
23	(Vietnam) Tan Son Nhat International Airport	Ho Chi Minh City	Vietnam	SGN	VVTS	40,738,295	18.9%
24	Hong Kong International Airport	Hong Kong	Hong Kong, China	HKG	VHHH	39,452,633	598.2%
25	(China) Beijing Daxing International Airport	Beijing	China	PKX	ZBAD	39,410,776	283.5%
26	(India) Kempegowda International Airport	Bangalore	India	BLR	VOBL	37,202,111	35.3%
27	(Turkey) Sabiha Gökçen International Airport	Istanbul	Turkey	SAW	LTFJ	37,098,432	20.5%
28	(Turkey) Antalya International Airport	Antalya	Turkey	AYT	LTAI	35,538,387	13.9%
29	(Taiwan) Taoyuan International Airport	Taipei/Taoyuan	Taiwan	TPE	RCTP	35,354,924	661.8%

== 2018 statistics ==
Rank	Airport	City	Country/Territory	Code (IATA)	Code (ICAO)	Total passengers	% change
1	(China) Beijing Capital International Airport	Beijing	China	PEK	ZBAA	100,983,290	5.4%
2	(United Arab Emirates) Dubai International Airport	Dubai	United Arab Emirates	DXB	OMDB	89,149,387	1.0%
3	(Japan) Tokyo-Haneda International Airport	Tokyo	Japan	HND	RJTT	87,098,683	1.9%
4	Hong Kong International Airport	Hong Kong	China/Hong Kong	HKG	VHHH	74,517,402	2.8%
5	(China) Shanghai Pudong International Airport	Shanghai	China	PVG	ZSPD	74,006,331	5.8%
6	(India) Indira Gandhi International Airport	Delhi	India	DEL	VIDP	69,866,994	10.1%
7	(China) Guangzhou Baiyun International Airport	Guangzhou	China	CAN	ZGGG	69,720,403	5.8%
8	(South Korea) Incheon International Airport	Seoul/Incheon	Republic of Korea	ICN	RKSI	68,259,763	10.0%
9	(Indonesia) Soekarno–Hatta International Airport	Jakarta/Tangerang	Indonesia	CGK	WIII	66,908,159	6.2%
10	Singapore Changi Airport	Singapore	Singapore	SIN	WSSS	65,627,356	5.4%
11	(Thailand) Suvarnabhumi Airport	Samut Prakan	Thailand	BKK	VTBS	63,378,923	4.1%
12	(Malaysia) Kuala Lumpur International Airport	Kuala Lumpur/Sepang	Malaysia	KUL	WMKK	59,959,000	2.4%
13	(China) Chengdu Shuangliu International Airport	Chengdu	China	CTU	ZUUU	52,950,529	6.3%
14	(India) Chhatrapati Shivaji Maharaj International Airport	Mumbai	India	BOM	VABB	49,877,918	5.7%
15	(China) Shenzhen Bao'an International Airport	Shenzhen	China	SZX	ZGSZ	49,348,950	8.2%
16	(China) Kunming Changshui International Airport	Kunming	China	KMG	ZPPP	47,088,140	5.3%
17	Taiwan Taoyuan International Airport	Taipei/Taoyuan	Taiwan	TPE	RCTP	46,535,180	3.7%
18	(Philippines) Ninoy Aquino International Airport	Manila	Philippines	MNL	RPLL	45,082,544	6.7%
19	(China) Xi'an Xianyang International Airport	Xi'an/Xianyang	China	XIY	ZLXY	44,653,311	6.2%
20	(China) Shanghai Hongqiao International Airport	Shanghai	China	SHA	ZSSS	43,628,004	4.2%
21	(Japan) Narita International Airport	Tokyo/Narita	Japan	NRT	RJAA	42,601,130	4.8%
22	(China) Chongqing Jiangbei International Airport	Chongqing	China	CKG	ZUCK	41,595,887	7.5%
23	(Saudi Arabia) King Abdulaziz International Airport	Jeddah	Saudi Arabia	JED	OEJN	41,200,000	21.4%
24	(Thailand) Don Mueang International Airport	Bangkok SGD	Thailand	DMK	VTBD	40,758,148	6.4%
25	(Vietnam) Tan Son Nhat International Airport	Ho Chi Minh City (Saigon)	Vietnam	SGN	VVTS	38,500,000	7.2%
26	(China) Hangzhou Xiaoshan International Airport	Hangzhou	China	HGH	ZSHC	38,241,630	7.5%
27	(Qatar) Hamad International Airport	Doha	Qatar	DOH	OTHH	35,400,000	1.3%
28	(Turkey) Sabiha Gökçen International Airport	Istanbul	Turkey	SAW	LTFJ	34,210,566	8.0%
29	(India) Kempegowda International Airport	Bangalore	India	BLR	VOBL	33,300,000	22.4%
30	(Japan) Kansai International Airport	Greater Osaka Area	Japan	KIX	RJBB	28,660,428	2.4%
31	(Turkey) Antalya Airport	Antalya	Turkey	AYT	LTAI	28,629,078	10.4%
32	(China) Nanjing Lukou International Airport	Nanjing	China	NKG	ZSNJ	28,581,546	10.6%
33	(China) Zhengzhou Xinzheng International Airport	Zhengzhou	China	CGO	ZHCC	27,334,730	12.4%
34	(Vietnam) Noi Bai International Airport	Hanoi	Vietnam	HAN	VVNB	27,000,000	17.1%
35	(Saudi Arabia) King Khalid International Airport	Riyadh	Saudi Arabia	RUH	OERK	26,772,525	6.9%
36	(China) Xiamen Gaoqi International Airport	Xiamen	China	XMN	ZSAM	26,553,438	8.2%
37	(South Korea) Jeju International Airport	Jeju	Republic of Korea	CJU	RKPC	26,290,832	11.1%
38	(China) Changsha Huanghua International Airport	Changsha	China	CSX	ZGHA	25,266,251	6.3%
39	(South Korea) Gimpo International Airport	Seoul	Republic of Korea	GMP	RKSS	24,602,588	1.9%
40	(China) Qingdao Liuting International Airport	Qingdao	China	TAO	ZSQD	24,535,738	5.7%
41	(China) Wuhan Tianhe International Airport	Wuhan	China	WUH	ZHHH	24,500,356	5.9%
42	(China) Haikou Meilan International Airport	Haikou	China	HAK	ZJHK	24,123,582	6.7%
43	(Japan) New Chitose Airport	Sapporo	Japan	CTS	RJCC	24,081,728	5.0%
44	(Indonesia) Ngurah Rai International Airport	Denpasar	Indonesia	DPS	WADD	23,779,178	13.0%
45	(China) Tianjin Binhai International Airport	Tianjin	China	TSN	ZBTJ	23,591,412	12.3%
46	(Japan) Fukuoka Airport	Fukuoka	Japan	FUK	RJFF	23,271,641	3.4%
47	(China) Ürümqi Diwopu International Airport	Ürümqi	China	URC	ZWWW	23,027,788	7.1%
48	(Israel) Ben Gurion Airport	Central District	Israel	TLV	LLBG	22,949,676	10.7%
49	(India) Chennai International Airport	Chennai	India	MAA	VOMM	22,243,650	10.0%
50	(United Arab Emirates) Abu Dhabi International Airport	Abu Dhabi	United Arab Emirates	AUH	OMAA	22,010,868	7.4%

== 2017 statistics ==
Rank	Airport	City	Country	Code (IATA/ICAO)	Total passengers	% change
1	(China) Beijing Capital International Airport	Beijing	China	PEK/ZBAA	95,786,296	4.5%
2	(United Arab Emirates) Dubai International Airport	Dubai	United Arab Emirates	DXB/OMDB	88,242,099	5.5%
3	(Japan) Tokyo International Airport	Tokyo	Japan	HND/RJTT	84,956,964	6.1%
4	Hong Kong International Airport	Hong Kong	China	HKG/VHHH	72,921,000	3.3%
5	(China) Shanghai Pudong International Airport	Shanghai	China	PVG/ZSPD	70,001,237	6.1%
6	(China) Guangzhou Baiyun International Airport	Guangzhou	China	CAN/ZGGG	65,806,977	10.2%
7	(India) Indira Gandhi International Airport	Delhi	India	DEL/VIDP	65,691,662	14.1%
8	(Indonesia) Soekarno–Hatta International Airport	Jakarta	Indonesia	CGK/WIII	63,015,620	12.0%
9	Singapore Changi Airport	Singapore	Singapore	SIN/WSSS	62,219,573	6.0%
10	(South Korea) Incheon International Airport	Seoul/Incheon	Republic of Korea	ICN/RKSI	62,082,032	7.5%
11	(Thailand) Suvarnabhumi Airport	Samut Prakan	Thailand	BKK/VTBS	60,860,704	8.9%
12	(Malaysia) Kuala Lumpur International Airport	Sepang	Malaysia	KUL/WMKK	58,554,627	11.2%
13	(China) Chengdu Shuangliu International Airport	Chengdu	China	CTU/ZUUU	49,801,693	8.2%
14	(India) Chhatrapati Shivaji International Airport	Mumbai	India	BOM/VABB	47,204,259	5.6%
15	(China) Shenzhen Bao'an International Airport	Shenzhen	China	SZX/ZGSZ	45,610,651	8.7%
16	Taiwan Taoyuan International Airport	Taipei	Taiwan	TPE/RCTP	44,878,703	6.1%
17	(China) Kunming Changshui International Airport	Kunming	China	KMG/ZPPP	44,727,691	6.5%
18	(Philippines) Ninoy Aquino International Airport	Manila	Philippines	MNL/RPLL	42,000,000	6.1%
19	(China) Shanghai Hongqiao International Airport	Shanghai	China	SHA/ZSSS	41,884,059	3.5%
20	(China) Xi'an Xianyang International Airport	Xi'an/Xianyang	China	XIY/ZLXY	41,857,229	13.1%
21	(Japan) Narita International Airport	Tokyo/Narita	Japan	NRT/RJAA	40,687,040	4.2%
22	(China) Chongqing Jiangbei International Airport	Chongqing	China	CKG/ZUCK	38,715,210	7.8%
23	(Thailand) Don Mueang International Airport	Bangkok SGD	Thailand	DMK/VTBD	38,299,757	8.8%
24	(Vietnam) Tan Son Nhat International Airport	Ho Chi Minh City (Saigon)	Vietnam	SGN/VVTS	35,900,000	10.5%
25	(Qatar) Hamad International Airport	Doha	Qatar	DOH/OTHH	35,867,252	3.9%
26	(China) Hangzhou Xiaoshan International Airport	Hangzhou	China	HGH/ZSHC	35,570,411	11.1%
27	(Saudi Arabia) King Abdulaziz International Airport	Jeddah	Saudi Arabia	JED/OEJN	33,917,282	8.0%
28	(Turkey) Sabiha Gökçen International Airport	Istanbul	Turkey	SAW/LTFJ	31,385,841	6.0%
29	(South Korea) Jeju International Airport	Jeju	Republic of Korea	CJU/RKPC	29,604,363	0.3%
30	(Japan) Kansai International Airport	Greater Osaka Area	Japan	KIX/RJBB	27,983,093	9.8%
31	(Turkey) Antalya Airport	Antalya	Turkey	AYT/LTAI	25,931,659	38.0%
32	(China) Nanjing Lukou International Airport	Nanjing	China	NKG/ZSNJ	25,822,936	13.4%
33	(South Korea) Gimpo International Airport	Seoul	Republic of Korea	GMP/RKSS	25,101,147	0.8%
34	(India) Kempegowda International Airport	Bangalore	India	BLR/VOBL	25,047,272	11.4%
35	(Saudi Arabia) King Khalid International Airport	Riyadh	Saudi Arabia	RUH/OERK	25,038,000	6.1%
36	(China) Xiamen Gaoqi International Airport	Xiamen	China	XMN/ZSAM	24,485,239	7.1%
37	(China) Zhengzhou Xinzheng International Airport	Zhengzhou	China	CGO/ZHCC	24,299,073	14.5%
38	(China) Changsha Huanghua International Airport	Changsha	China	CSX/ZGHA	23,764,820	10.3%
39	(United Arab Emirates) Abu Dhabi International Airport	Abu Dhabi	United Arab Emirates	AUH/OMAA	23,760,561	0.3%
40	(China) Wuhan Tianhe International Airport	Wuhan	China	WUH/ZHHH	23,129,400	10.1%
41	(China) Qingdao Liuting International Airport	Qingdao	China	TAO/ZSQD	23,210,530	10.5%
42	(Vietnam) Noi Bai International Airport	Hanoi	Vietnam	HAN/VVNB	23,068,227	12.0%
43	(Japan) Fukuoka Airport	Fukuoka	Japan	FUK/RJFF	22,484,678	6.0%
44	(Japan) New Chitose Airport	Sapporo	Japan	CTS/RJCC	22,916,914	6.0%
45	(Indonesia) Ngurah Rai International Airport	Denpasar	Indonesia	DPS/WADD	22,863,647	12.5%
46	(China) Haikou Meilan International Airport	Haikou	China	HAK/ZJHK	22,584,815	16.7%
47	(Indonesia) Juanda International Airport	Surabaya	Indonesia	SUB/WARR	21,882,335	10.9%
48	(China) Ürümqi Diwopu International Airport	Ürümqi	China	URC/ZWWW	21,500,901	6.0%
49	(China) Tianjin Binhai International Airport	Tianjin	China	TSN/ZBTJ	21,005,001	19.6%
50	(Israel) Ben Gurion Airport	Central District	Israel	TLV/LLBG	20,781,226	10.3%

== 2016 statistics ==
Rank	Airport	City	Country	Code (IATA/ICAO)	Total passengers	% change
1.	(China) Beijing Capital International Airport	Beijing	China	PEK/ZBAA	92,313,000	4.7%
2.	(United Arab Emirates) Dubai International Airport	Dubai	United Arab Emirates	DXB/OMDB	83,654,250	7.2%
3.	(Japan) Tokyo International Airport	Tokyo	Japan	HND/RJTT	79,520,000	5.6%
4.	Hong Kong International Airport	Hong Kong	China	HKG/VHHH	70,502,000	2.9%
5.	(China) Shanghai Pudong International Airport	Shanghai	China	PVG/ZSPD	65,982,100	9.9%
6.	Singapore Changi Airport	Singapore	Singapore	SIN/WSSS	59,780,000	5.9%
7.	(China) Guangzhou Baiyun International Airport	Guangzhou	China	CAN/ZGGG	58,698,000	8.3%
8.	(South Korea) Seoul Incheon International Airport	Seoul	Republic of Korea	ICN/RKSI	57,765,397	16.9%
9.	(Thailand) Suvarnabhumi Airport	Samut Prakan	Thailand	BKK/VTBS	55,892,428	5.7%
10.	(India) Indira Gandhi International Airport	Delhi	India	DEL/VIDP	55,631,385	21.0%
11.	(Indonesia) Soekarno-Hatta International Airport	Jakarta	Indonesia	CGK/WIII	54,969,536	1.7%
12.	(Malaysia) Kuala Lumpur International Airport	Sepang	Malaysia	KUL/WMKK	52,620,000	7.5%
13.	(China) Chengdu Shuangliu International Airport	Chengdu	China	CTU/ZUUU	46,039,000	9.0%
14.	(India) Chhatrapati Shivaji International Airport	Mumbai	India	BOM/VABB	44,978,526	9.9%
15.	Taiwan Taoyuan International Airport	Taipei	Taiwan	TPE/RCTP	42,296,322	9.9%
16.	(China) Kunming Changshui International Airport	Kunming	China	KMG/ZPPP	41,980,300	11.9%
17.	(China) Shenzhen Bao'an International Airport	Shenzhen	China	SZX/ZGSZ	41,975,000	5.7%
18.	(China) Shanghai Hongqiao International Airport	Shanghai	China	SHA/ZSSS	40,452,900	3.5%
19.	(Philippines) Ninoy Aquino International Airport	Manila	Philippines	MNL/RPLL	39,500,000	8.0%
20.	(Japan) Narita International Airport	Tokyo/Narita	Japan	NRT/RJAA	39,053,652	4.9%
21.	(Qatar) Hamad International Airport	Doha	Qatar	DOH/OTHH	37,322,843	20.4%
22.	(China) Xi'an Xianyang International Airport	Xi'an/Xianyang	China	XIY/ZLXY	36,994,300	12.2%
23.	(China) Chongqing Jiangbei International Airport	Chongqing	China	CKG/ZUCK	35,888,800	10.8%
24.	(Thailand) Don Mueang International Airport	Bangkok SGD	Thailand	DMK/VTBD	35,203,757	13.9%
25.	(Vietnam) Tan Son Nhat International Airport	Ho Chi Minh City (Saigon)	Vietnam	SGN/VVTS	32,486,537	22.4%
26.	(China) Hangzhou Xiaoshan International Airport	Hangzhou	China	HGH/ZSHC	31,595,000	11.4%
27.	(Saudi Arabia) King Abdulaziz International Airport	Jeddah	Saudi Arabia	JED/OEJN	31,003,000	3.0%
28.	(South Korea) Jeju International Airport	Jeju	Republic of Korea	CJU/RKPC	29,707,364	13.2%
29.	(Japan) Kansai International Airport	Greater Osaka Area	Japan	KIX/RJBB	25,232,279	8.6%
30.	(South Korea) Gimpo International Airport	Seoul	Republic of Korea	GMP/RKSS	25,043,088	8.1%
31.	(United Arab Emirates) Abu Dhabi International Airport	Abu Dhabi	United Arab Emirates	AUH/OMAA	24,482,119	5.1%
32.	(Saudi Arabia) King Khalid International Airport	Riyadh	Saudi Arabia	RUH/OERK	23,400,000	6.6%
33.	(China) Xiamen Gaoqi International Airport	Xiamen	China	XMN/ZSAM	22,737,000	9.2%
34.	(China) Nanjing Lukou International Airport	Nanjing	China	NKG/ZSNJ	22,358,100	16.6%
35.	(India) Kempegowda International Airport	Bangalore	India	BLR/VOBL	22,187,841	22.5%
36.	(China) Changsha Huanghua International Airport	Changsha	China	CSX/ZGHA	21,296,700	13.7%
37.	(Japan) Fukuoka Airport	Fukuoka	Japan	FUK/RJFF	20,968,463	6.4%
38.	(China) Wuhan Tianhe International Airport	Wuhan	China	WUH/ZHHH	20,771,000	9.6%
39.	(China) Zhengzhou Xinzheng International Airport	Zhengzhou	China	CGO/ZHCC	20,760,000	20.0%
40.	(China) Qingdao Liuting International Airport	Qingdao	China	TAO/ZSQD	20,660,000	13.5%
41.	(Vietnam) Noi Bai International Airport	Hanoi	Vietnam	HAN/VVNB	20,596,632	19.6%
42.	(Japan) New Chitose Airport	Sapporo	Japan	CTS/RJCC	20,461,531	6.1%
43.	(China) Ürümqi Diwopu International Airport	Ürümqi	China	URC/ZWWW	20,200,800	9.1%
44.	(Indonesia) Ngurah Rai International Airport	Denpasar	Indonesia	DPS/WADD	19,986,415	16.8%
45.	(Indonesia) Juanda International Airport	Surabaya	Indonesia	SUB/WARR	19,483,844	13.6%
46.	(China) Haikou Meilan International Airport	Haikou	China	HAK/ZJHK	18,803,800	16.3%
47.	(Japan) Naha Airport	Naha	Japan	OKA/ROAH	18,336,030	6.0%
48.	(Israel) Ben Gurion Airport	Central District	Israel	TLV/LLBG	17,936,810	10.0%
49.	(India) Chennai International Airport	Chennai	India	MAA/VOMM	17,733,375	19.9%
50.	(China) Sanya Phoenix International Airport	Sanya	China	SYX/ZJSY	17,370,000	7.2%

== 2015 statistics ==
Airports Council International's full-year figures are as follows.

Rank	Airport	Location	Country	Code (IATA/ICAO)	Total passengers	% change
1.	(China) Beijing Capital International Airport	Chaoyang-Shunyi, Beijing	China	PEK/ZBAA	90,203,000	4.4%
2.	(United Arab Emirates) Dubai International Airport	Garhoud, Dubai	United Arab Emirates	DXB/OMDB	78,014,838	10.7%
3.	(Japan) Tokyo International Airport	Ōta, Tokyo	Japan	HND/RJTT	75,300,000	3.5%
4.	Hong Kong International Airport	Chek Lap Kok, Islands	China	HKG/VHHH	68,488,000	8.1%
5.	(China) Shanghai Pudong International Airport	Pudong, Shanghai	China	PVG/ZSPD	59,700,000	17.7%
6.	(Indonesia) Soekarno-Hatta International Airport	Jakarta/Tanggerang	Indonesia	CGK/WIII	57,000,000	0%
7.	Singapore Changi Airport	Changi, East	Singapore	SIN/WSSS	55,448,964	2.5%
8.	(China) Guangzhou Baiyun International Airport	Baiyun-Huadu, Guangzhou, Guangdong	China	CAN/ZGGG	55,200,000	0.8%
9.	(Thailand) Suvarnabhumi Airport	Bang Phli, Samut Prakan	Thailand	BKK/VTBS	52,918,785	14.8%
10.	(South Korea) Seoul Incheon International Airport	Jung, Incheon	Republic of Korea	ICN/RKSI	49,281,220	8.3%
11.	(Malaysia) Kuala Lumpur International Airport	Sepang, Selangor	Malaysia	KUL/WMKK	48,915,655	0%
12.	(India) Indira Gandhi International Airport	Delhi	India	DEL/VIDP	45,981,165	18%
13.	(China) Chengdu Shuangliu International Airport	Shuangliu-Wuhou, Chengdu, Sichuan	China	CTU/ZUUU	42,244,842	12.0%
14.	(India) Chhatrapati Shivaji International Airport	Mumbai, Maharashtra	India	BOM/VABB	40,637,377	16.1%
15.	(China) Shenzhen Bao'an International Airport	Bao'an, Shenzhen, Guangdong	China	SZX/ZGSZ	39,721,619	9.5%
16.	(China) Shanghai Hongqiao International Airport	Changning-Minhang, Shanghai	China	SHA/ZSSS	39,090,699	3.0%
17.	Taiwan Taoyuan International Airport	Dayuan, Taoyuan	Taiwan	TPE/RCTP	38,473,333	7.5%
18.	(China) Kunming Changshui International Airport	Guandu District, Kunming, Yunnan	China	KMG/ZPPP	37,523,345	16.0%
19.	(Japan) Narita International Airport	Narita, Chiba	Japan	NRT/RJAA	37,268,307	4.9%
20.	(Philippines) Ninoy Aquino International Airport	Pasay/Parañaque, Metro Manila	Philippines	MNL/RPLL	36,583,459	7.3%

== 2011 statistics ==
Airports Council International's preliminary full-year figures are as follows, as of March 19, 2012.

Rank	Country	Airport	City	IATA/ICAO code	Total passengers	Change
1.	China	Beijing Capital International Airport	Beijing	PEK/ZBAA	77,403,668	4.7%
2.	Japan	Tokyo International Airport	Tokyo	HND/RJTT	62,263,025	2.9%
3.	Hong Kong, China	Hong Kong International Airport	Hong Kong	HKG/VHHH	53,314,213	5.9%
4.	Indonesia	Soekarno–Hatta International Airport	Jakarta	CGK/WIII	52,446,618	19.3%
5.	United Arab Emirates	Dubai International Airport	Dubai	DXB/OMDB	50,977,960	8.1%
6.	Thailand	Suvarnabhumi Airport	Samut Prakan	BKK/VTBS	47,910,744	12.0%
7.	Singapore	Singapore Changi Airport	Singapore	SIN/WSSS	46,543,845	10.7%
8.	China	Guangzhou Baiyun International Airport	Guangzhou	CAN/ZGGG	45,040,340	9.0%
9.	China	Shanghai Pudong International Airport	Shanghai	PVG/ZSPD	41,450,211	2.6%
10.	Malaysia	Kuala Lumpur International Airport	Sepang	KUL/WMKK	37,670,586	10.5%

== 2010 statistics ==
Airports Council International's final full-year figures are as follows.

Rank	Country	Airport	City	IATA/ICAO code	Total passengers	Change
1.	China	Beijing Capital International Airport	Beijing	PEK/ZBAA	73,948,113	13.1%
2.	Japan	Tokyo International Airport	Tokyo	HND/RJTT	64,211,074	3.7%
3.	Hong Kong, China	Hong Kong International Airport	Hong Kong	HKG/VHHH	50,348,960	10.5%
4.	United Arab Emirates	Dubai International Airport	Dubai	DXB/OMDB	47,180,628	15.4%
5.	Indonesia	Soekarno-Hatta International Airport	Jakarta	CGK/WIII	44,355,998	19.4%
6.	Thailand	Suvarnabhumi Airport	Samut Prakan	BKK/VTBS	42,784,967	5.6%
7.	Singapore	Singapore Changi Airport	Singapore	SIN/WSSS	42,038,777	13.0%
8.	China	Guangzhou Baiyun International Airport	Guangzhou	CAN/ZGGG	40,975,673	10.6%
9.	China	Shanghai Pudong International Airport	Shanghai	PVG/ZSPD	40,578,621	26.4%

== 2009 statistics ==
Airports Council International's final full year figures are as follows.

Rank	Country	Airport	City	IATA/ICAO code	Total passengers	Change
1.	China	Beijing Capital International Airport	Beijing	PEK/ZBAA	65,372,012	16.9%
2.	Japan	Tokyo International Airport	Tokyo	HND/RJTT	61,903,656	7.2%
3.	Hong Kong, China	Hong Kong International Airport	Hong Kong	HKG/VHHH	45,558,807	4.8%
4.	United Arab Emirates	Dubai International Airport	Dubai	DXB/OMDB	40,901,752	9.2%
5.	Thailand	Suvarnabhumi Airport	Samut Prakan	BKK/VTBS	40,500,224	4.9%
6.	Singapore	Singapore Changi Airport	Singapore	SIN/WSSS	37,203,978	1.3%
7.	Indonesia	Soekarno–Hatta International Airport	Jakarta	CGK/WIII	37,143,719	15.2%
8.	China	Guangzhou Baiyun International Airport	Guangzhou	CAN/ZGGG	37,048,712	10.8%

== 2008 statistics ==
Rank	Country	Airport	City	IATA/ICAO code	Total	Change
1.	Japan	Tokyo International Airport	Tokyo	HND/RJTT	66,754,849	0.2%
2.	China	Beijing Capital International Airport	Beijing	PEK/ZBAA	55,937,389	4.4%
3..	Hong Kong, China	Hong Kong International Airport	Hong Kong	HKG/VHHH	47,857,746	1.7%
4.	Thailand	Suvarnabhumi Airport	Samut Prakan	BKK/VTBS	38,603,490	6.3%
5.	Singapore	Singapore Changi Airport	Changi	SIN/WSSS	37,694,824	2.7%
6.	United Arab Emirates	Dubai International Airport	Dubai	DXB/OMDB	37,441,440	9.0%
7.	China	Guangzhou Baiyun International Airport	Guangzhou	CAN/ZGGG	33,435,472	8.0%
8.	Japan	Narita International Airport	Tokyo	NRT/RJAA	32,678,405	7.7%
9.	Indonesia	Soekarno-Hatta International Airport	Jakarta	CGK/WIII	32,172,114	0.9%
10.	South Korea	Incheon International Airport	Seoul	ICN/RKSI	29,973,522	4.0%
11.	China	Shanghai Pudong International Airport	Shanghai	PVG/ZSPD	28,235,691	2.4%
12.	Malaysia	Kuala Lumpur International Airport	Sepang	KUL/WMKK	27,529,355	2.2%
13.	India	Chhatrapati Shivaji International Airport	Mumbai	BOM/VABB	24,300,000	13.5%
14.	India	Indira Gandhi International Airport	Delhi	DEL/VIDP	23,970,000	15.3%
15.	China	Shanghai Hongqiao International Airport	Shanghai	SHA/ZSSS	22,877,404	1.1%
16.	Philippines	Ninoy Aquino International Airport	Manila	MNL/RPLL	22,300,000	4.9%
17.	Taiwan	Taipei Taoyuan International Airport	Taipei	TPE/RCTP	21,936,083	6.4%
18.	China	Shenzhen Bao'an International Airport	Shenzhen	SZX/ZGSZ	21,400,509	3.8%
19.	Saudi Arabia	King Abdulaziz International Airport	Jeddah	JED/OEJN	17,626,000	8.1%
20.	China	Chengdu Shuangliu International Airport	Chengdu	CTU/ZUUU	17,246,806	7.1%
21.	Pakistan	Jinnah International Airport	Karachi	KHI/OPKC	16,267,109	5.2%
22.	Japan	Kansai International Airport	Osaka	KIX/RJBB	15,332,766	8.0%
23.	Qatar	Doha International Airport	Doha	DOH/OTBD	14,930,252	22.1%
24.	South Korea	Gimpo International Airport	Seoul	GMP/RKSS	14,264,693	3.3%
25.	China	Hangzhou Xiaoshan International Airport	Hangzhou	HGH/ZSHC	12,673,198	8.0%
26.	South Korea	Jeju International Airport	Jeju	CJU/RKPC	12,448,084	1.2%
27.	Vietnam	Tân Sơn Nhất International Airport	Ho Chi Minh City (Saigon)	SGN/VVTS	12,424,680	1.2%
28.	Iran	Mehrabad International Airport	Tehran	THR/OIII	12,094,218	2.8%
29.	China	Xi'an Xianyang International Airport	Xi'an	XIY/ZLXY	11,921,919	4.8%
30.	Saudi Arabia	King Khalid International Airport	Riyadh	RUH/OERK	11,350,000	3.8%
31.	China	Chongqing Jiangbei International Airport	Chongqing	CKG/ZUCK	11,138,432	7.6%
32.	United Arab Emirates	Abu Dhabi International Airport	Abu Dhabi	AUH/OMAA	10,660,000	18.8%

== See also ==
- List of busiest airports by passenger traffic
- List of the busiest airports in the Middle East
