= Zhongyang Island =

Island in Taiwan

Coordinates: 23°35′44″N 119°35′18″E

Zhongyang Island (Traditional Chinese: 中央嶼), also known as Da Yang Island, is referred to by the locals in Xiyu Township as Nanpei-zi (in Taiwanese Hanzi: 𡳞脬仔, in Taiwanese Romanization: lān-pha á), because its island shape resembles male genitalia. It is an island in Magong City, Penghu County, Taiwan, with an area of approximately 0.0116 square kilometers, making it the smallest island in Magong City. Located about 600 meters northeast of Jianshanjiao in Shee Way Township, the highest point is approximately 11 meters high. During low tide, it can be accessed by wading from Jianshanjiao in Shee Way Township.
