= Suogang Fishing Port =

Fishing port in Magong, Penghu, Taiwan

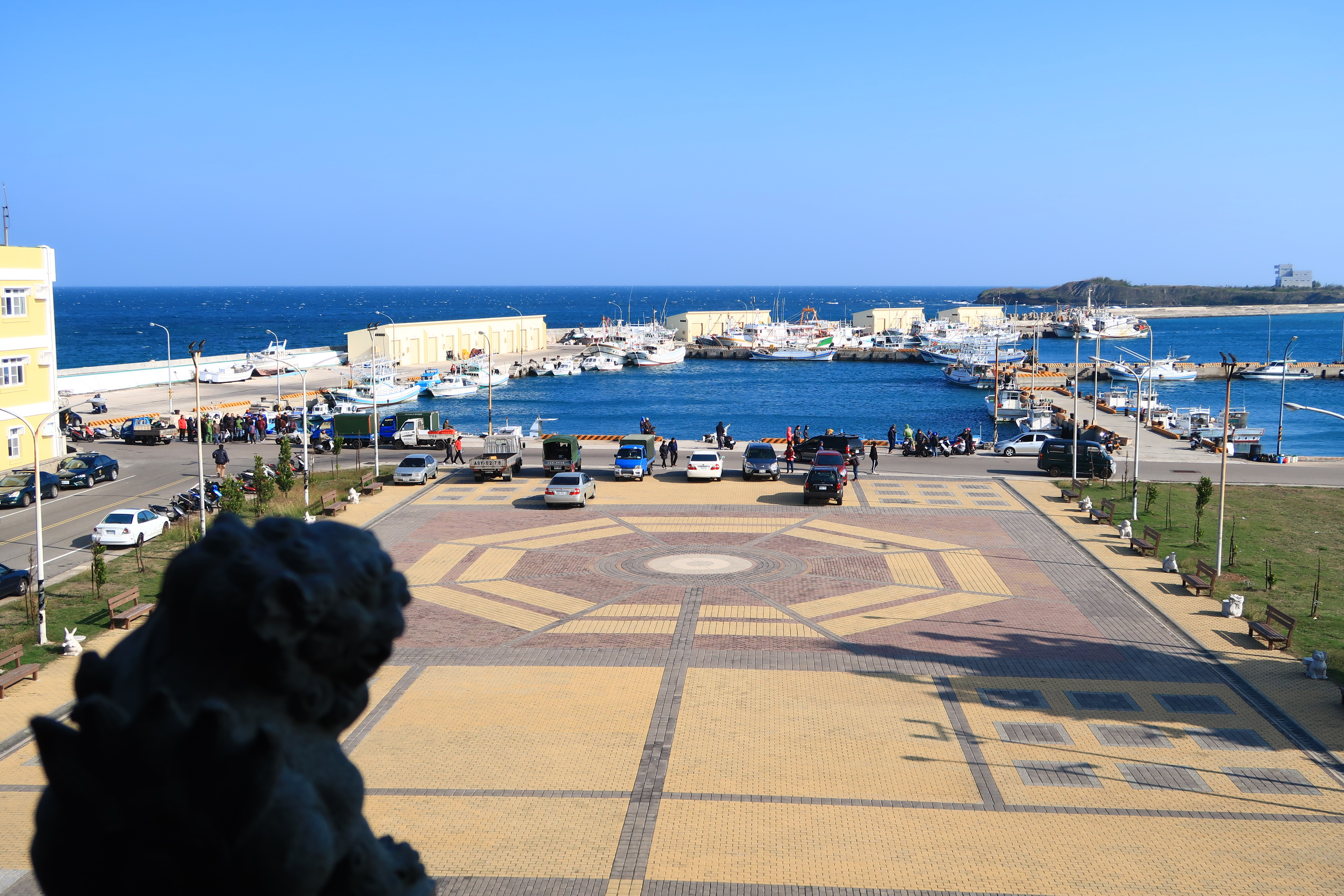
- Interactive map of Suogang Fishing Port
- Location in Taiwan
- Native name: 鎖港漁港

Location
- Location: Magong, Penghu, Taiwan
- Coordinates: 23°31′32.2″N 119°36′20.4″E

Details
- Opened: May 1953
- Type of harbour: fishing port
- Size: 240 m

The Suogang Fishing Port (traditional Chinese: 鎖港漁港; simplified Chinese: 锁港渔港; pinyin: Suǒgǎng Yúgǎng) is a fishing port in Suogang Village, Magong City, Penghu County, Taiwan.

== History ==
The port was constructed in May 1953.

== Architecture ==
The port wharf spans over a length of 240 meters. It is protected by a 127 meters long seawall. In 1977, the berthing area dredging works were completed. The port features gas station, ice storage, fishing gear preparation area and auction area. There is also a fish market at the port.

== Economy ==
The port is the main distribution center for fish.

== See also ==
- Port of Taichung
