= Shigong Temple =

Temple in Magong, Penghu, Taiwan

- 施公祠
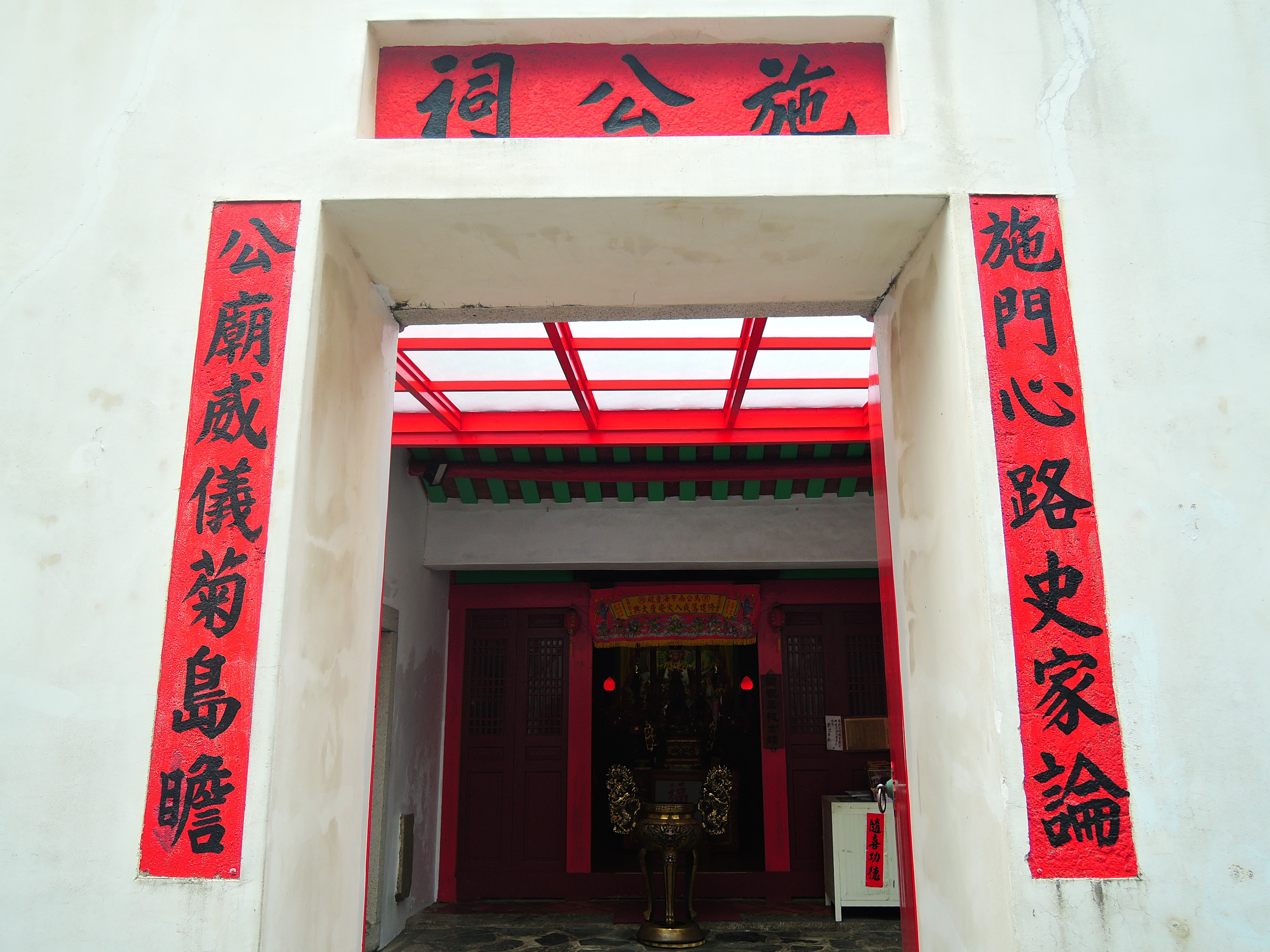

Religion
- Affiliation: Taoism

Location
- Location: Magong, Penghu, Taiwan
- Interactive map of Shigong Temple
- Coordinates: 23.5646°N 119.5620°E

Architecture
- Completed: Between 1683 and 1696

The Shigong Temple (Chinese: 施公祠; pinyin: Shīgōng Cí) is a temple in Magong City, Penghu County, Taiwan. It was founded between 1683 and 1696 around, for commemorating Shi Lang (Chinese: 施琅,1621-1696), a famous general of the Navy during the Qing dynasty, who defeated Liu Guoxuan (Chinese: 劉國軒, pinyin: liú guó xuān), who belonged with Kingdom of Tungning in Penghu sea area in 1683. Qing Empire added Penghu and Taiwan to its domains in the next year. After Shi Lang was conferred as Marquess by Kangxi Emperor, some people built this temple in the area of Penghu hospital when Shi Lang was alive. The original name of Shigong Temple was called "General Shi Temple (Chinese: 施將軍廟)" in the beginning.

== History ==
1832 (Daoguang 12th year of Qing dynasty), General Shi Temple started to serve some soldiers who died in "Rebellion of Zhang Bing (Chinese: 張丙之亂)" happened in Taiwan Main Island, afterwards, General Shi Temple changed its name into "Shigong Temple".

During Qing dynasty, there were many pilgrims visited Shigong Temple daily, its scale of construction was also much larger than the present. Entering the period of Japan rule, the Japanese ruler started to promote the historical status of Koxinga, who was the founder of Tungning Kingdom, based on his mixed descent. ( Koxinga's mother was a Japanese from Kyushu.)

As a result, Shi Lang as a conquer of Tungning Kingdom, his political status would be demeaned by the Japan ruler undoubtedly, so it affected the visitors of Shigong Temple was fewer until the present.

According to the establishment of Penghu hospital in 1914 (Taishō 3rd year of Japan Empire), the Shigong Temple was moved to the eastern side of Tianhou Temple (Chinese: 天后宮), where was ever a kitchen of military camp during Qing dynasty.

== Gallery ==
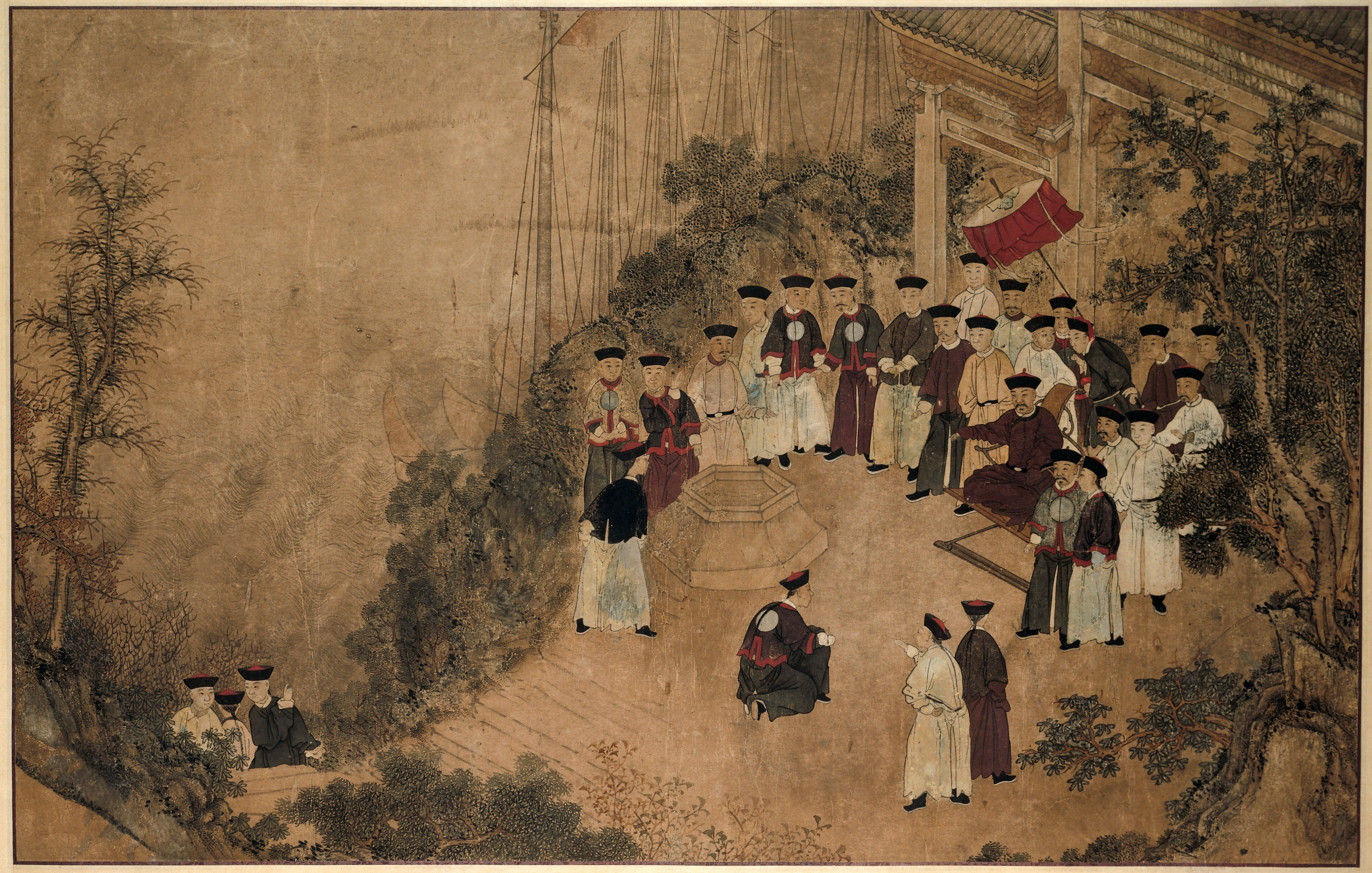

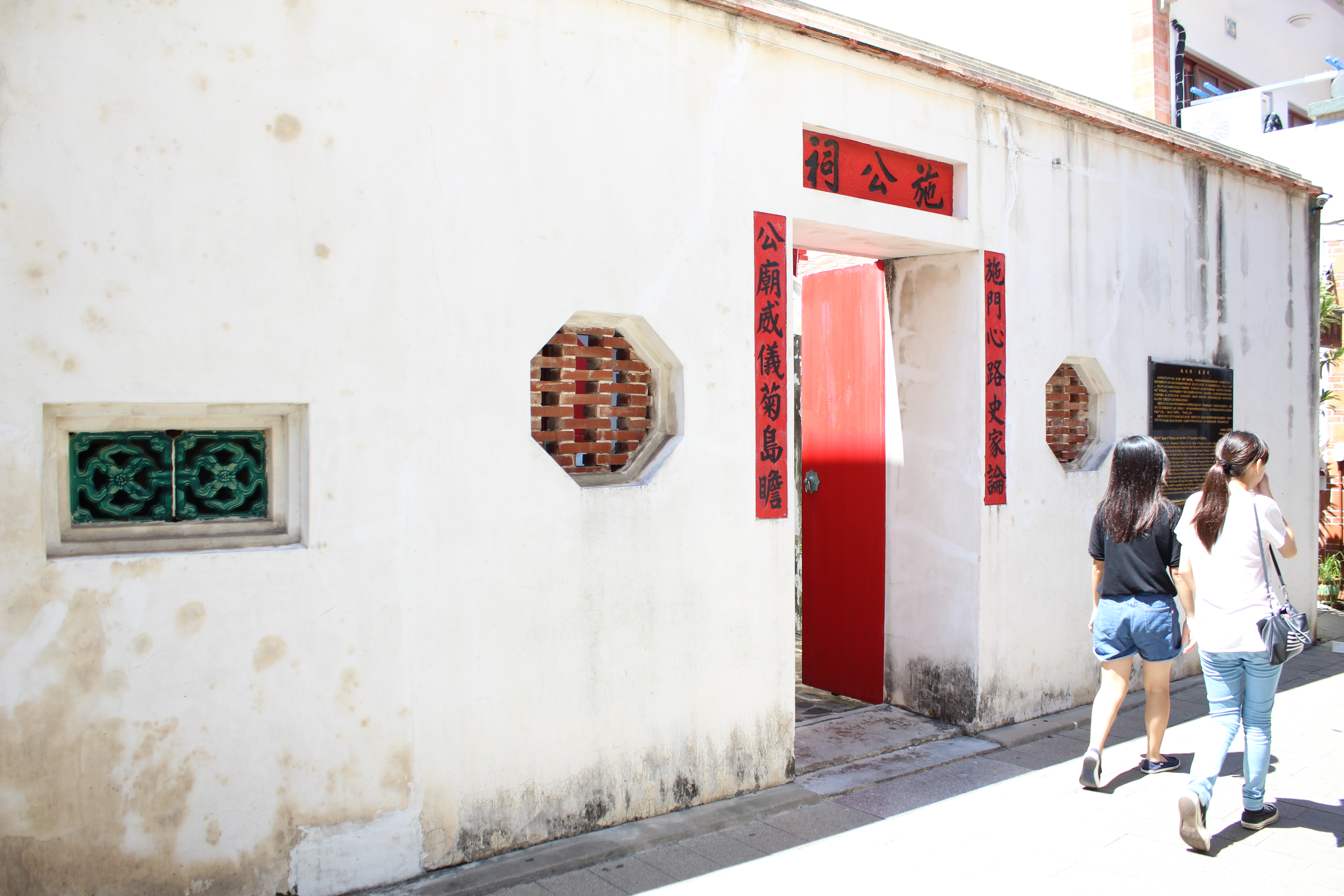

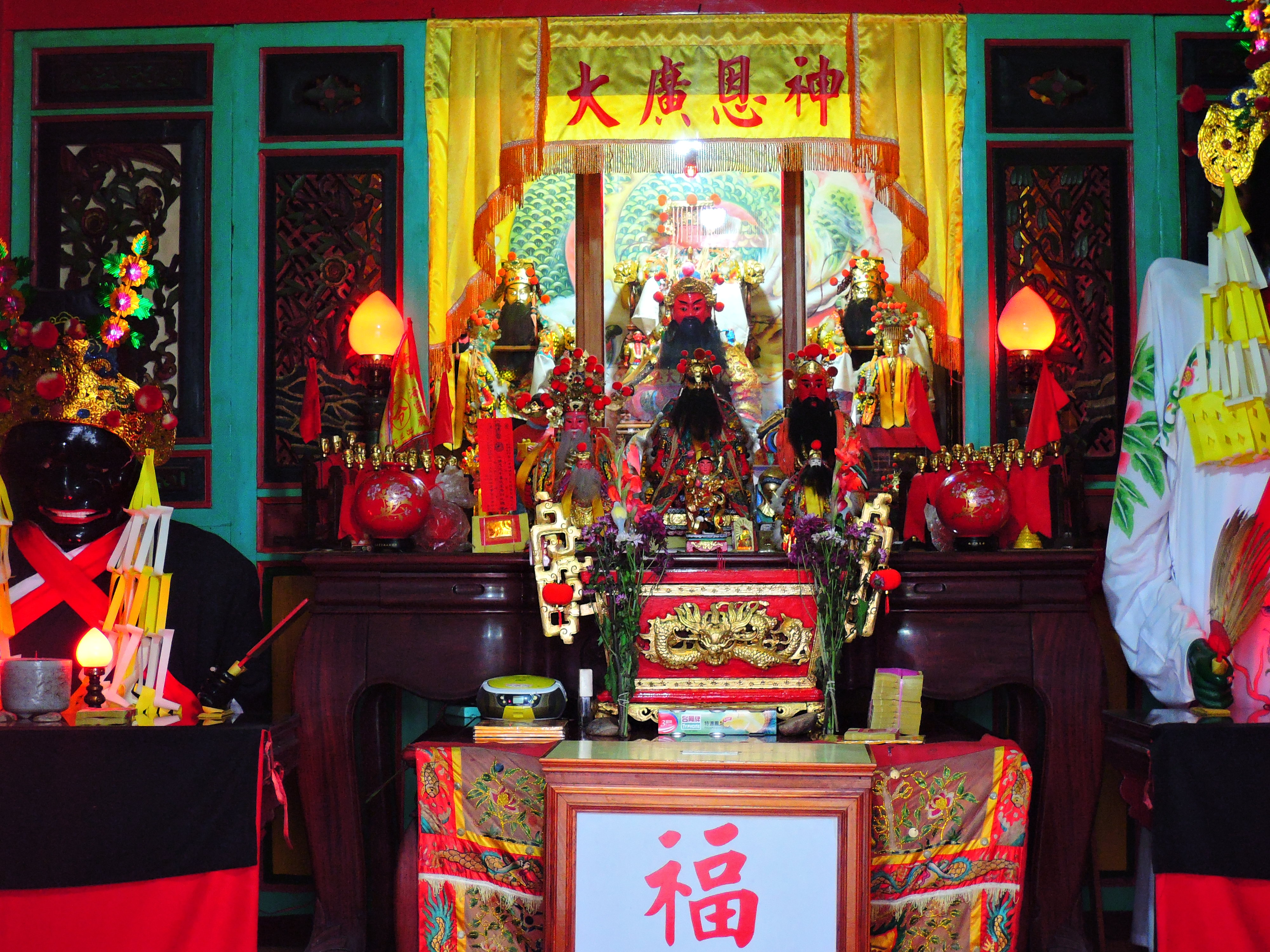

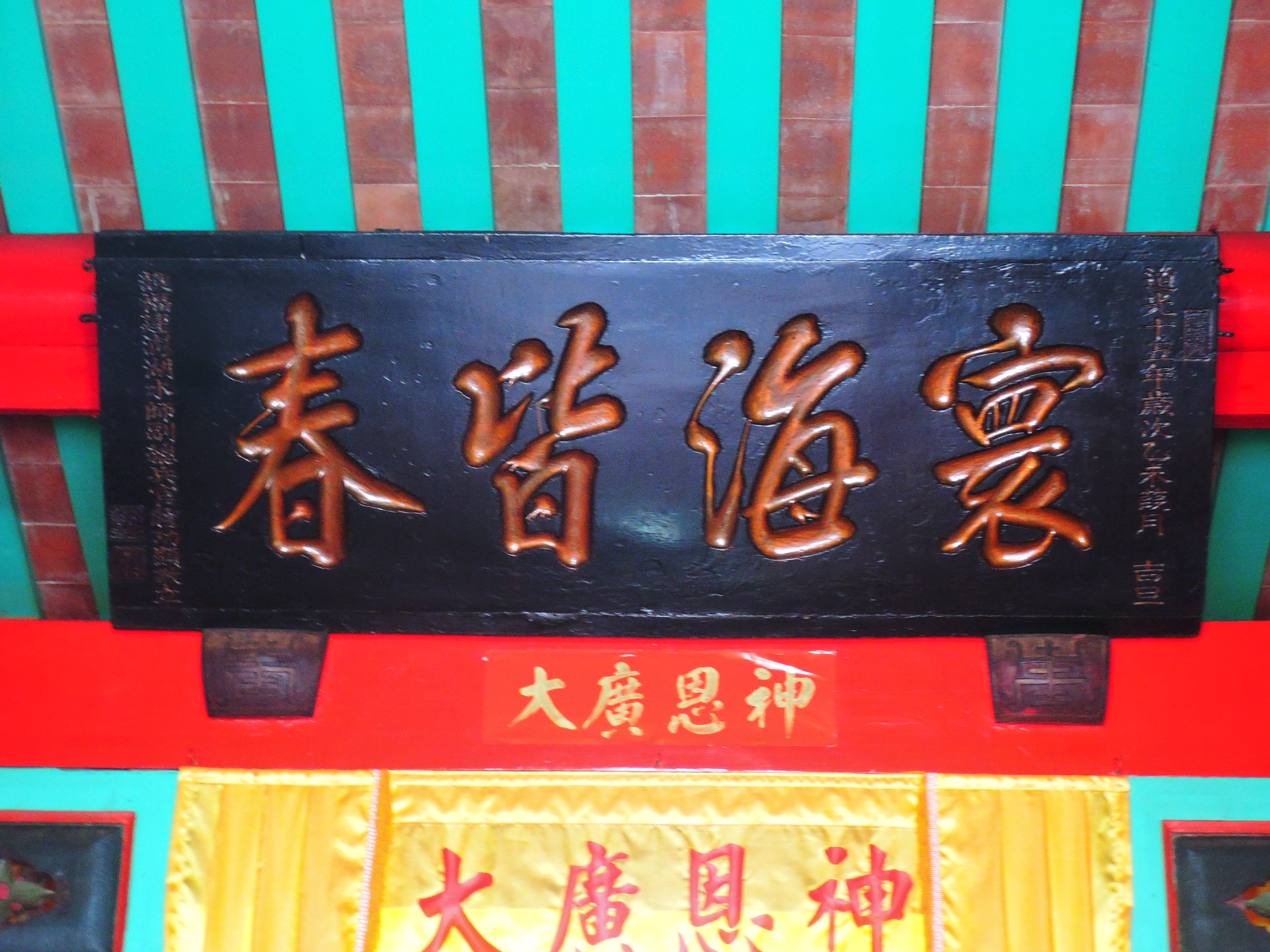

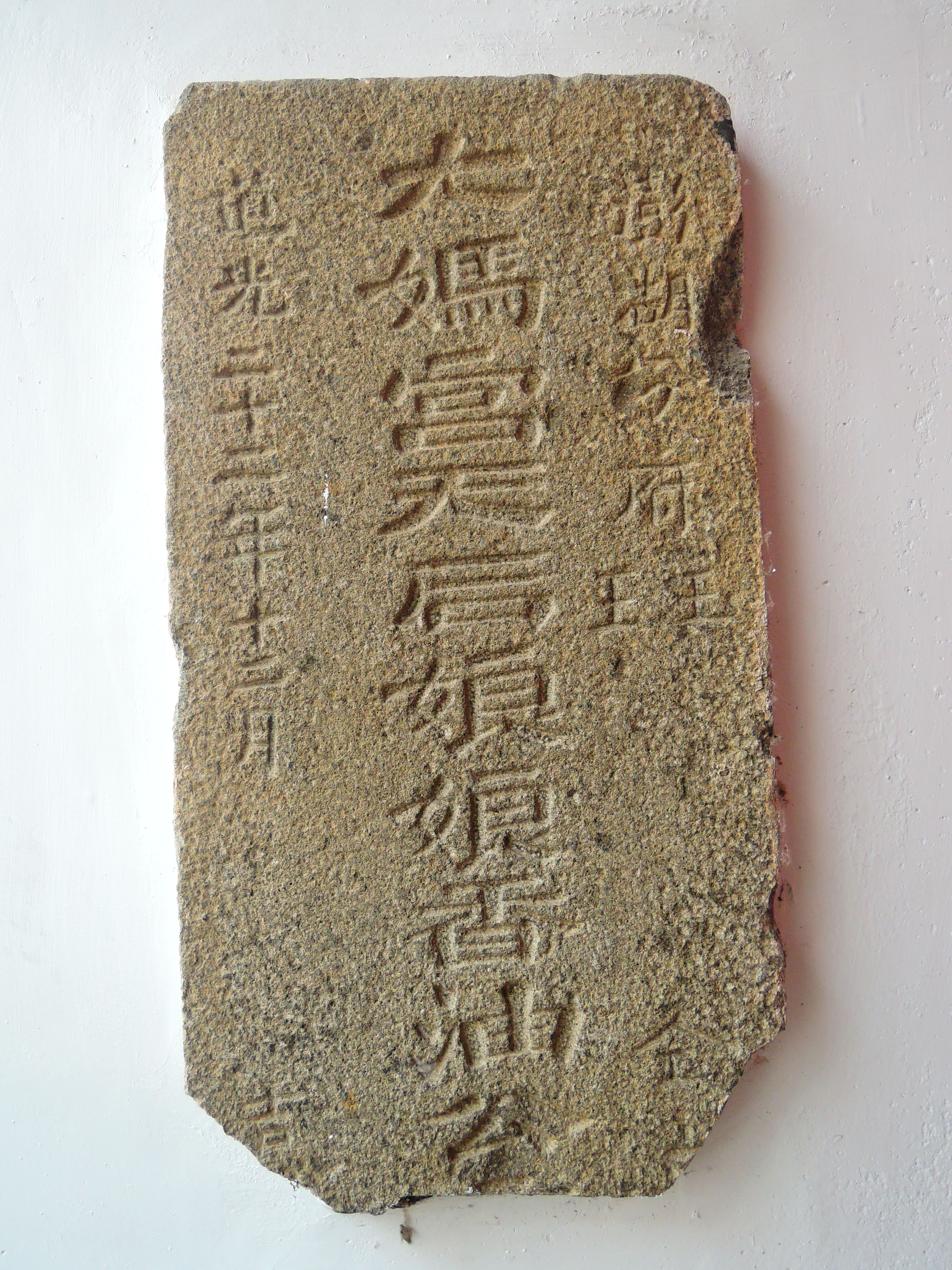

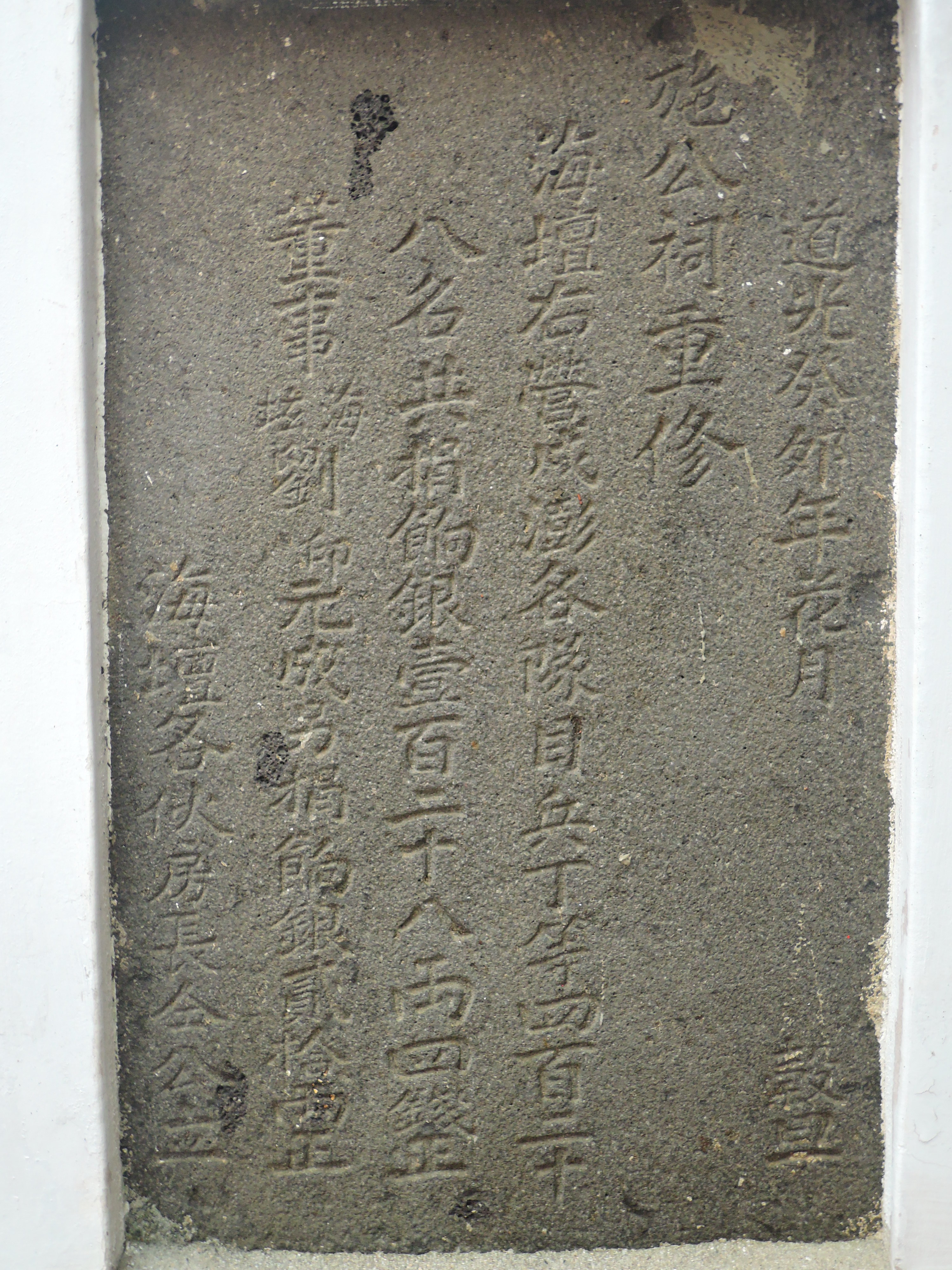
