= Fenggui Cave =

Cave in Magong, Penghu, Taiwan

- 風櫃洞
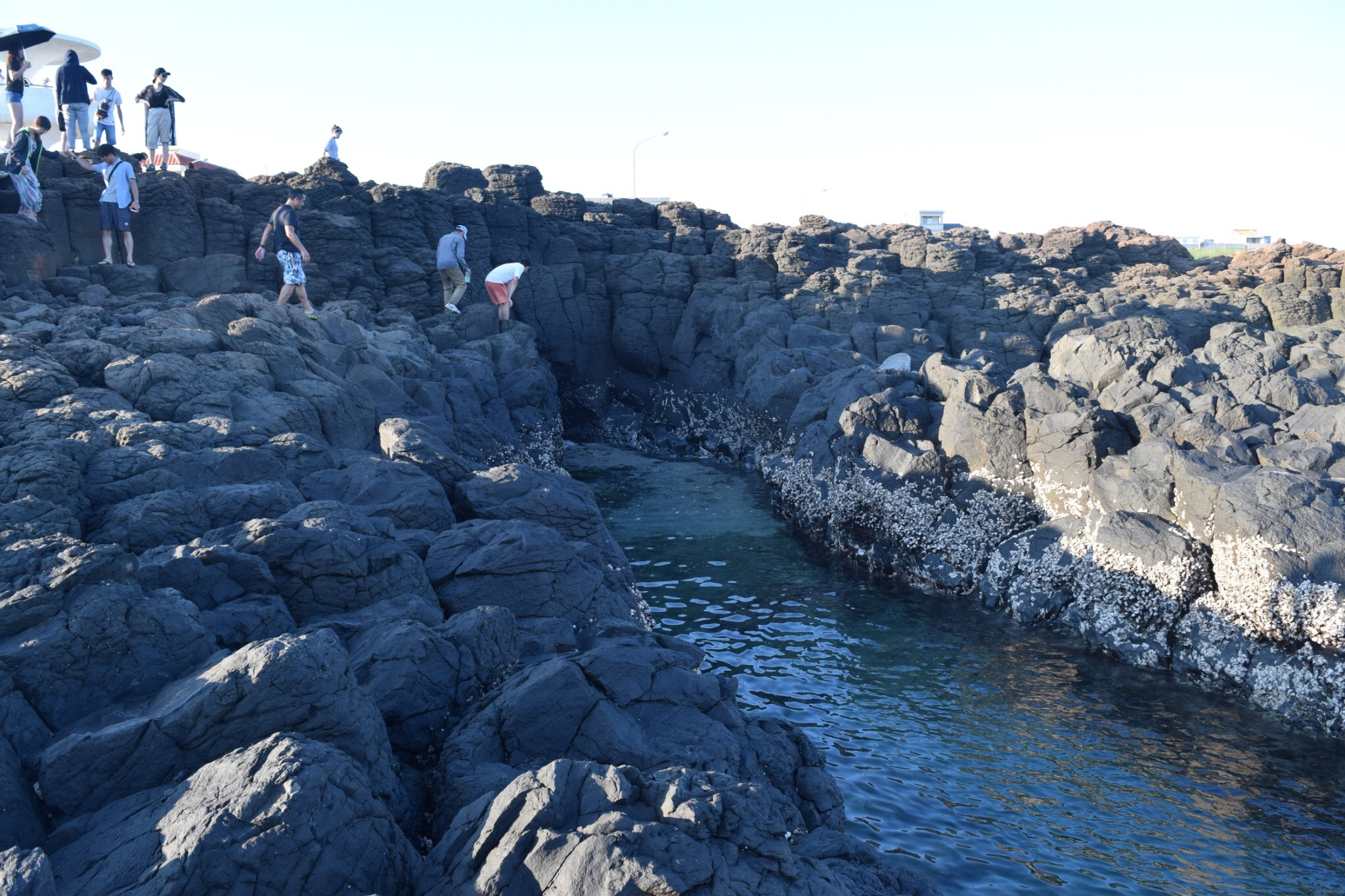

- Location within Taiwan
- Location: Magong, Penghu, Taiwan
- Coordinates: 23°32′16.2″N 119°32′37.6″E
- Geology: cave

Fenggui Cave (traditional Chinese: 風櫃洞; simplified Chinese: 风柜洞; pinyin: Fēngguì Dòng) is a cave in Magong City, Penghu County, Taiwan.

== Name ==
The name Fenggui means a kind of wind cabinet of Chinese organ.

== Geology ==
The cave was formed by the continuous sea waves erosion on to its coastal areas. It features a two-story shell-shaped pavilion nearby.

== See also ==
- Geology of Taiwan
