= Penghu Reclamation Hall =

Former residence in Magong, Penghu, Taiwan

- 澎湖開拓館
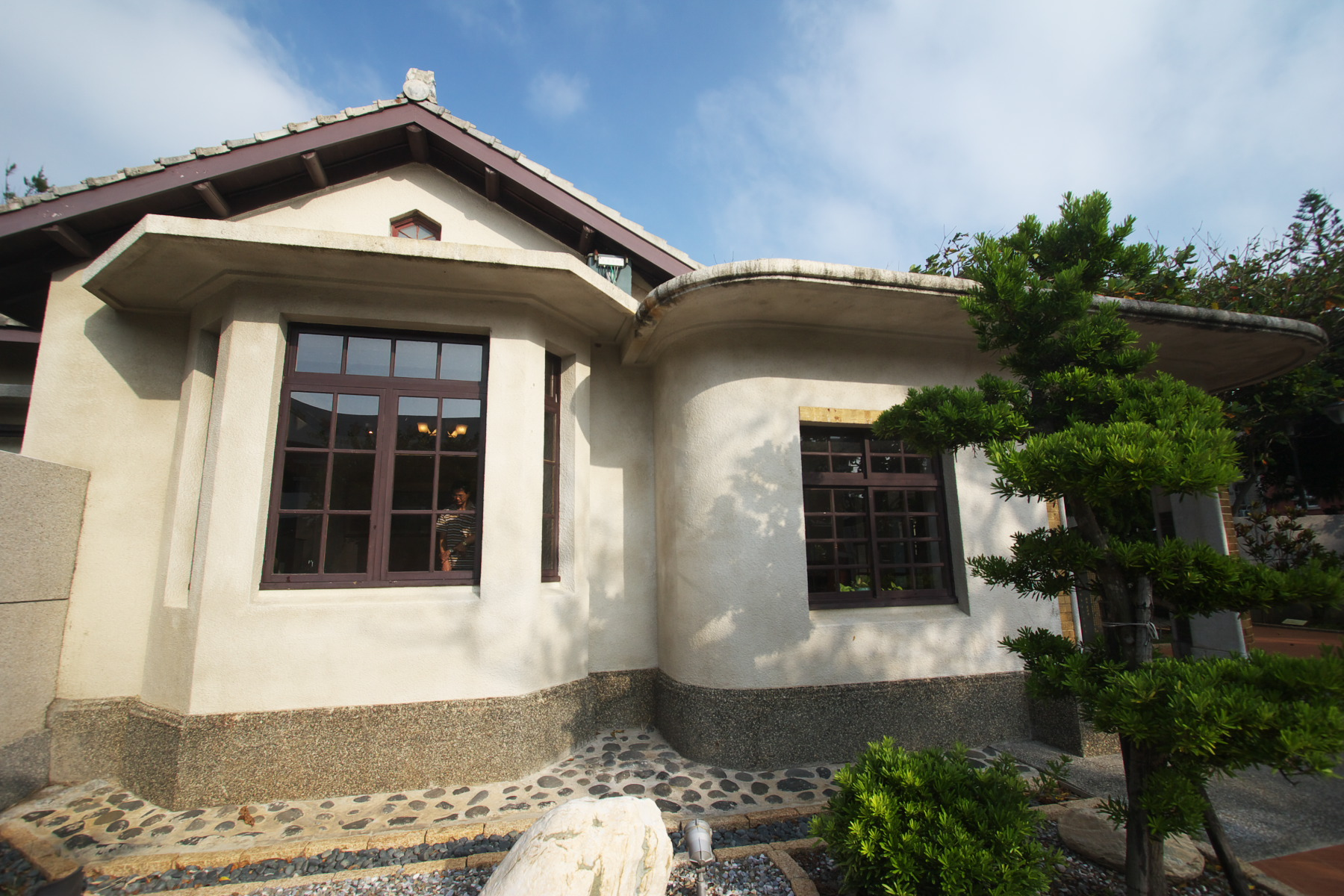
- Interactive map of the Penghu Reclamation Hall area

General information
- Type: former residence
- Architectural style: Japanese
- Location: Magong, Penghu, Taiwan
- Coordinates: 23°34′11.1″N 119°34′01.7″E
- Completed: 1935

Website
- Official website

The Penghu Reclamation Hall (traditional Chinese: 澎湖開拓館; simplified Chinese: 澎湖开拓馆; pinyin: Pēnghú Kāità Guǎn) is a museum in Magong Township, Penghu County, Taiwan, dedicated to the history of settlement in Penghu Islands.

== History ==
The museum building was originally constructed in 1935 as the official residence of the Hōko Prefecture governor. After the handover of Taiwan from Japan to the Republic of China in 1945, the building became the official residence of the Penghu County magistrate. In 1992, the building ceased to be used as an official residence. In 2000, renovation to transform the residence into a museum started. Upon completion, the hall was officially opened in July, 2003.

== Architecture ==
The building was constructed in a mixture of western and Japanese architectural style. It has European style octagonal windows, wooden doors, Japanese sliding doors and Japanese roofs. It also features a garden with old Banyan trees. It contains several exhibition areas: “The Prelude of Penghu Exploration”, “Immigrants from Faraway”, “Settlements in Penghu”, “ War and Battles at Penghu”, “The Political and Economic Infrastructure of Penghu”.

== See also ==
- List of tourist attractions in Taiwan
