= Erdai Art Hall =

Art center in Magong, Penghu, Taiwan

- 二呆藝館
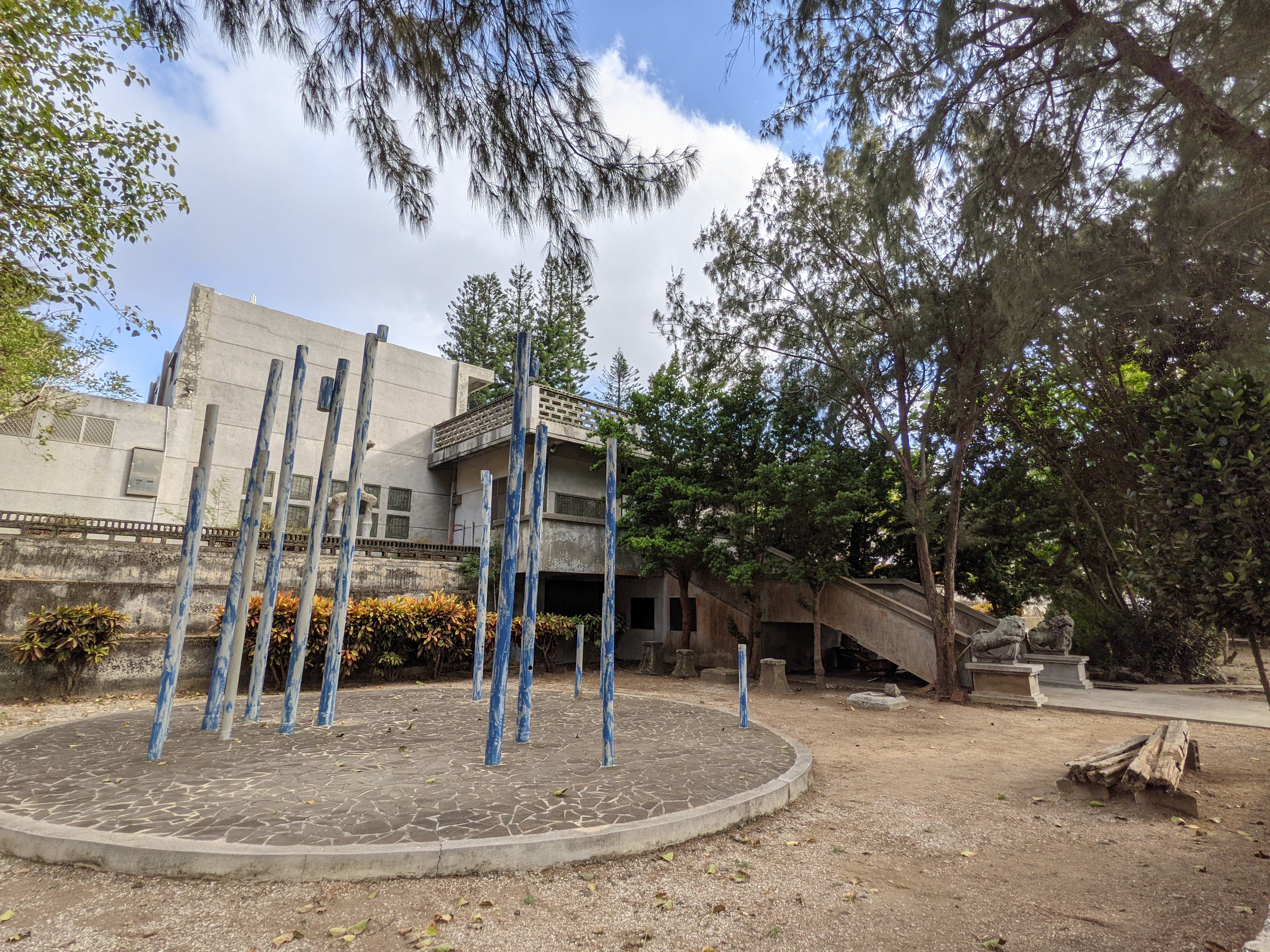
- Interactive map of the Erdai Art Hall area

General information
- Type: art center
- Location: Magong, Penghu, Taiwan
- Coordinates: 23°34′16.9″N 119°34′36.1″E
- Opened: 28 September 1990
- Cost: NT$10 million

Technical details
- Floor count: 2

The Erdai Art Hall (traditional Chinese: 二呆藝館; simplified Chinese: 二呆艺馆; pinyin: Èrdāi Yìguǎn) is an art center in Magong City, Penghu County, Taiwan.

== History ==
Originally, the Penghu County Government donated a piece of land to Mr. Erdai for the construction of the art center. The art center was opened on 28 September 1990 after being constructed with a cost of NT$10 million. In 1995, Mr. Erdai passed away and the building was taken over by the Cultural Affairs Bureau of the county government. It was then renovated into an art memorial hall.

== Architecture ==
The art center building was constructed on a 990 m^{2} area of land. It consists of two floors, including one basement area.

== Exhibitions ==
The art center consists of two exhibition areas, which are the indoor area and outdoor area. The indoor area displays Mr. Erdai's various art works, including paintings poetry, literature etc. The outdoor area displays his poetry, sculptures and stones engraved with articles.

== See also ==
- List of tourist attractions in Taiwan
