= Penghu Living Museum =

Museum in Magong, Penghu, Taiwan

- 澎湖生活博物館
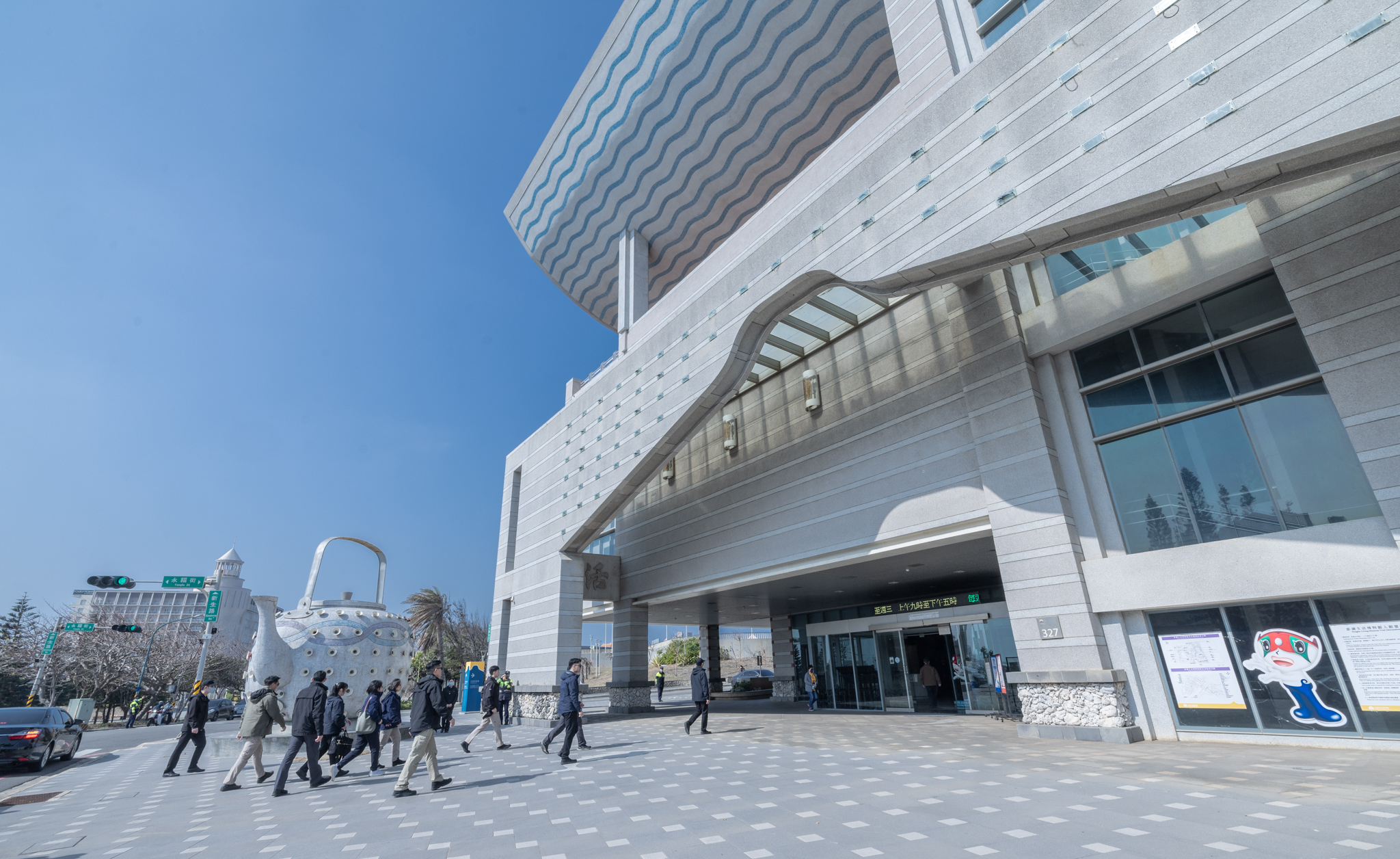
- Established: 3 April 2010
- Location: Magong, Penghu, Taiwan
- Coordinates: 23°34′01″N 119°34′45″E
- Type: museum
- Website: Official website

The Penghu Living Museum (PHLM; traditional Chinese: 澎湖生活博物館; simplified Chinese: 澎湖生活博物馆; pinyin: Pēnghú Shēnghuó Bówùguǎn) is a museum about the customs and culture of Penghu in Magong City, Penghu County, Taiwan.

== History ==
In 2001, the Taipei National University of the Arts was commissioned to do the preliminary study and to lay the foundation for the project launching. The construction was completed in 2009 and the museum was opened on 3 April 2010.

== Exhibitions ==
=== Second floor ===
- The Ocean and Penghu
- Penghu's History of Glamour
- May Heaven Bless Our Land
- Folk Customs and Lifestyle

=== Third floor ===
- The Fruit of Good Fortune is Ever Growing
- Trivia of Penghu Lifestyle
- Forum and Theater

== See also ==
- List of museums in Taiwan
