= Jinguitou Fortress =

Former fort in Magong, Penghu, Taiwan

- 金龜頭砲臺
- Magong, Penghu, Taiwan
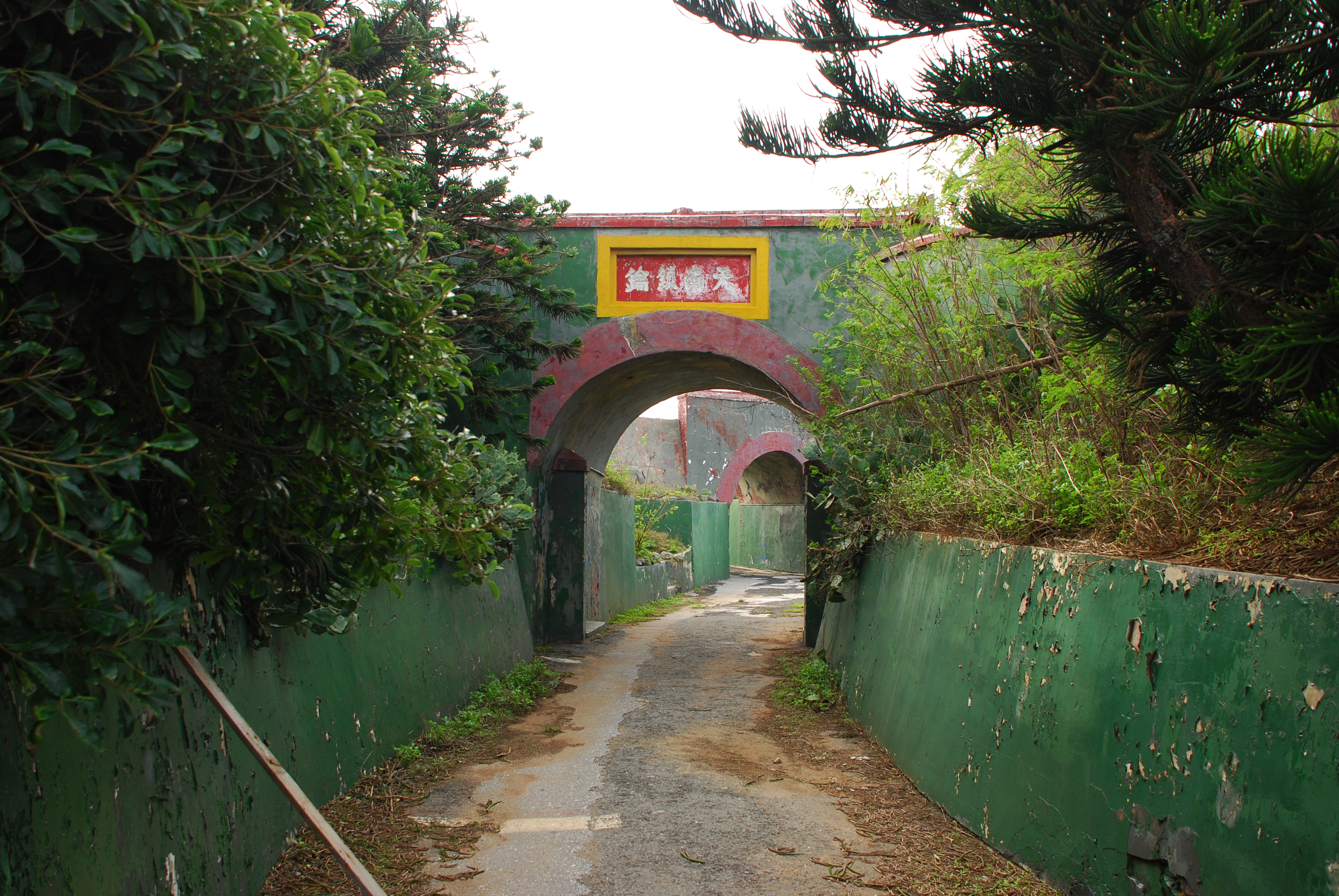

Site information
- Type: fort

Location
- Taiwan
- Coordinates: 23°33′46.1″N 119°33′28.5″E

Site history
- Built: 1864

The Jinguitou Fortress (traditional Chinese: 金龜頭砲臺; simplified Chinese: 金龟头炮台; pinyin: Jīnguītóu Pàotái) is a former fort in Magong City, Penghu, Taiwan.

== History ==
At the early stage, an artillery was already built at the site of the fortress during the Kingdom of Tungning. In 1717, the new Penghu city was rebuilt at the fortress area during the Qing Dynasty rule. In 1864, the fortress was reconstructed by Vice Brigadier General Wu Qixun and named it Jinguitou Fortress. During the Sino-French War in 1884–1885, the fortress was destroyed. After the war ended, Liu Mingchuan was appointed as governor to handle the reconstruction works in Taiwan. In 1887, Wu Hongluo was appointed by him as garrison commander to rebuild the forts in Penghu. During the Japanese rule of Taiwan, the Imperial Japanese Army used the fortress for their military maneuvers. After the handover of Taiwan from Japan to the Republic of China in 1945, the Nationalist Government change the space usage of the fortress.

== Architecture ==
The fortress is rectangular in shape with inner and outer walls. It has two arched entrances. Nearby the fortress are the large barrack, large and ammunition depots and three offices.

== See also ==
- List of tourist attractions in Taiwan
