= Four-eyed Well =

Water well in Magong, Penghu, Taiwan

- 四眼井
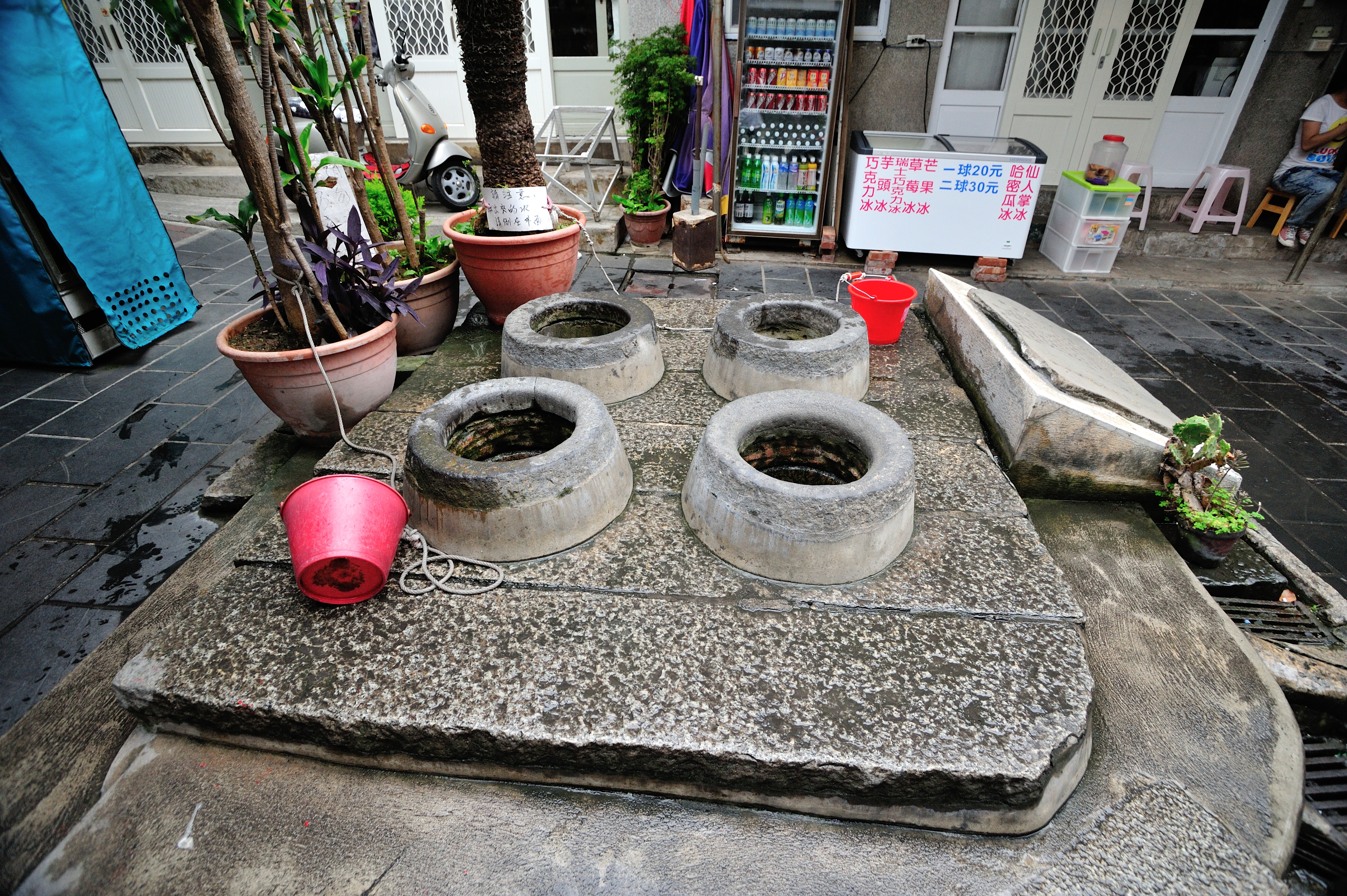
- Interactive map of the Four-eyed Well area

General information
- Type: water well
- Location: Magong, Penghu, Taiwan
- Coordinates: 23°33′54.5″N 119°33′54″E
- Completed: exact date unknown; (Note: The Penghu National Scenic Area Administration puts the date of establishment in the Yuan dynasty. Travel King puts it at 1592, in the Ming dynasty.); Yuan or Ming dynasty

The Four-eyed Well (Chinese: 四眼井; pinyin: Sì Yǎn Jǐng) is a historical water well in Magong City, Penghu County, Taiwan.

== History ==
The well is thought to have been dug during the Yuan or Ming dynasties. It is registered as a class 3 historical monument in Penghu.

== Architecture ==
It consists of a single cavity well with a depth of 5.6 meters and a diameter of 2 meters, covered with a stone slab through which are four holes for drawing water.

== See also ==
- List of tourist attractions in Taiwan
