= Magong =

County-administered city in Penghu County, Taiwan

Magong 馬公市 Makō, Makung
- County-administered city
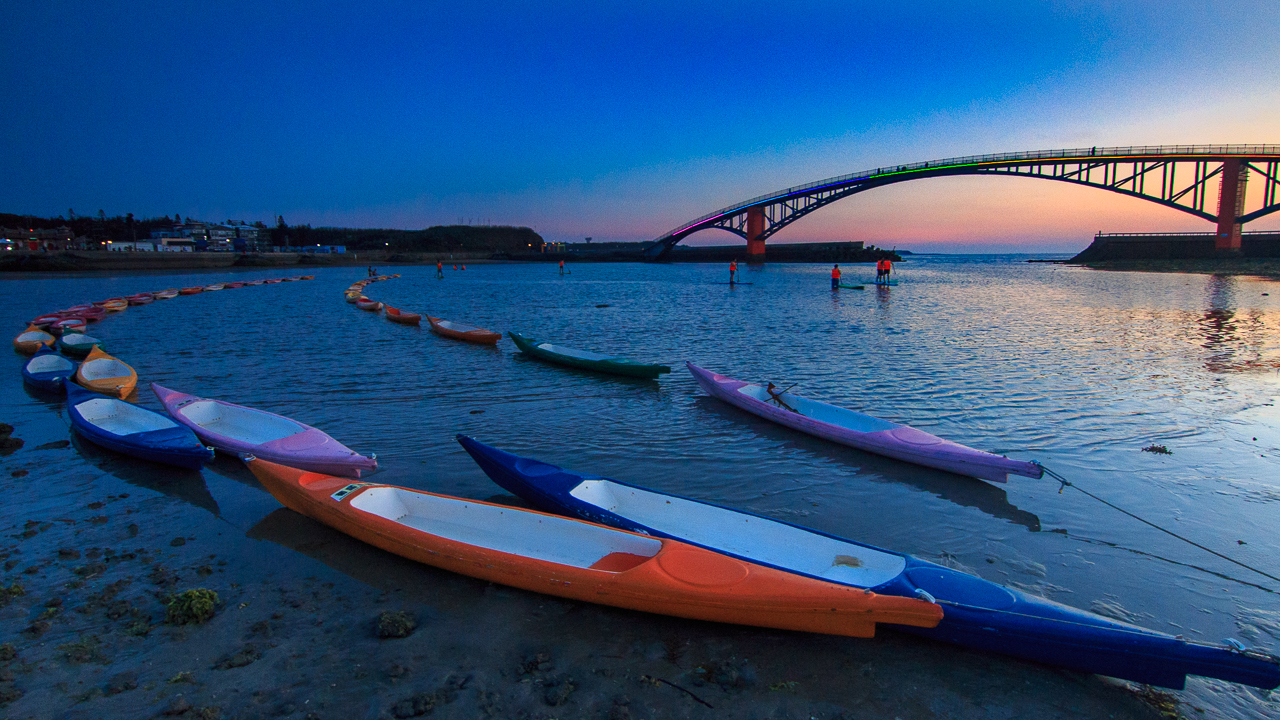

- Seal

- Magong City in Penghu County

- Location in the Republic of China
- Coordinates: 23°34′N 119°35′E
- Country: Republic of China (Taiwan)
- County: Penghu

Government
  - Mayor (市長): Huang Jian-jhong

Area
  - Total: 33.9918 km^{2} (13.1243 sq mi)

Population (March 2023)
  - Total: 63,745
  - Density: 1,875.3/km^{2} (4,857.0/sq mi)
- Website: www.mkcity.gov.tw

Magong City

Chinese name
- Traditional Chinese: 馬公市
- Simplified Chinese: 马公市
- Hokkien POJ: Má-keng-chhī
- Literal meaning: Horse Lord (or “Mazu Temple” for the original name)
Transcriptions
Standard Mandarin
- Hanyu Pinyin: Mǎgōng Shì
- Bopomofo: ㄇㄚˇ ㄍㄨㄥ ㄕˋ
- Gwoyeu Romatzyh: Maagong Shyh
- Wade–Giles: Ma³-kung¹ Shih⁴
- Tongyong Pinyin: Mǎgong Shìh
- MPS2: Mǎgūng Shr̀
- IPA: [mà.kʊ́ŋ ʂɻ̩̂]
Hakka
- Pha̍k-fa-sṳ: Mâ-kûng-sṳ
Southern Min
- Hokkien POJ: Má-keng-chhī
- Tâi-lô: Má-king-tshī

Port Magong
- Traditional Chinese: 媽宮澳
- Simplified Chinese: 妈宫澳
- Hokkien POJ: Má-keng-ò
- Literal meaning: Port of the Mother's Palace
Transcriptions
Standard Mandarin
- Hanyu Pinyin: Māgōng'ào
- Bopomofo: ㄇㄚ ㄍㄨㄥ ㄠˋ
- Gwoyeu Romatzyh: Mhagong'aw
- Wade–Giles: Ma¹-kung¹-ao⁴
- Tongyong Pinyin: Magong'ào
- MPS2: Māgūngàu
- IPA: [má.kʊ́ŋ.âʊ]
Southern Min
- Hokkien POJ: Má-keng-ò
- Tâi-lô: Má-king-ò

Japanese name
- Kanji: 馬公市
Transcriptions
- Romanization: Makō-shi

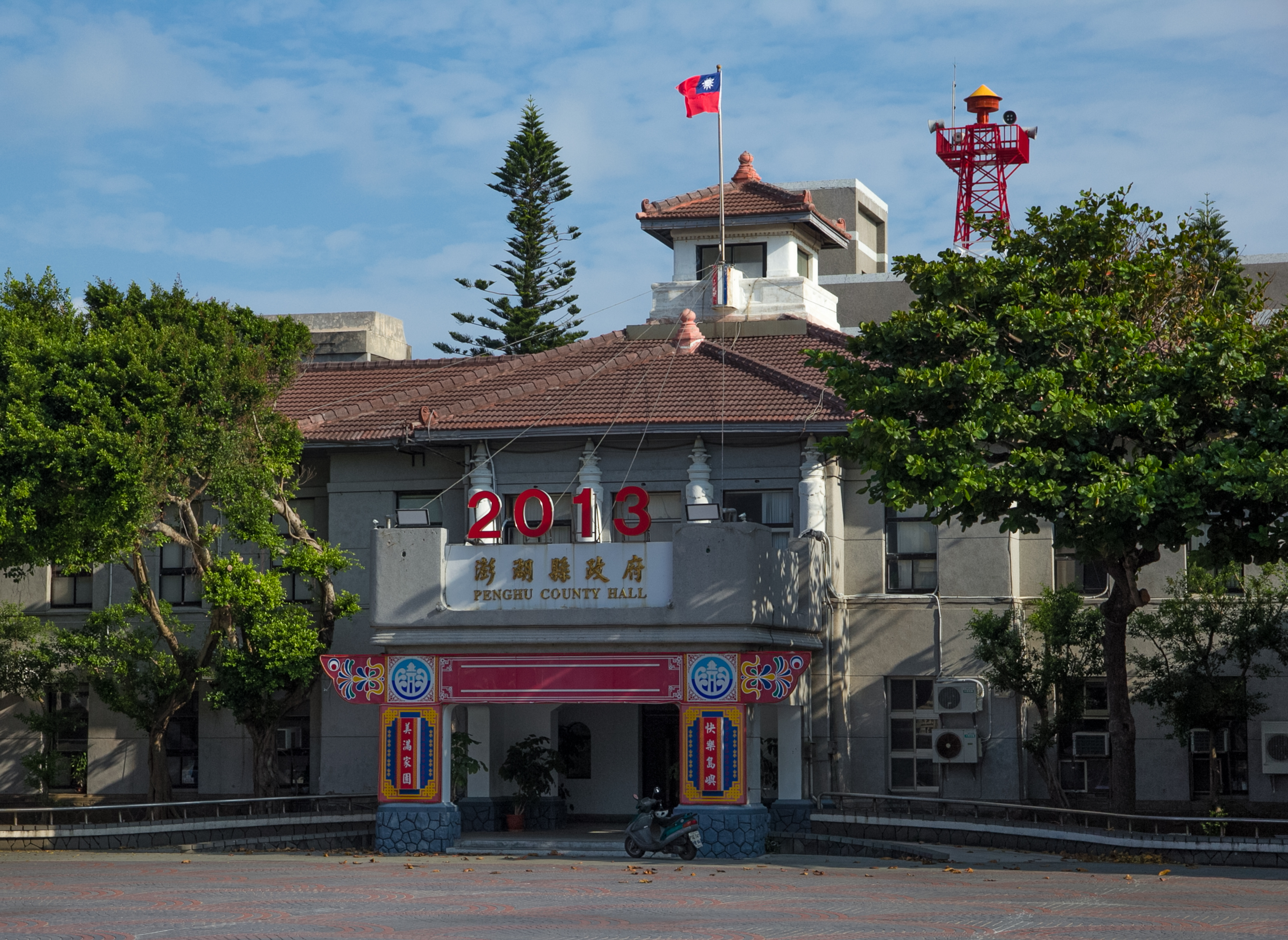
Penghu County Hall

Magong (Makō, Makung) is a county-administered city and seat of Penghu County, Taiwan located on Penghu's main island, bordering Huxi Township to the east. It is the seat of Penghu County and the political, economic, cultural, and transportation center of the Penghu Islands. It covers an area of approximately 33.9918 square kilometers and has a population of about 63,000, with a density of over 1,800 people per square kilometer. It is the largest, most populous, and most densely populated administrative district in Penghu County.

== Name ==
As early as the Ming and Qing dynasties, it was recorded in various names such as "娘宮," (niáng-gōng) "媽澳," (mā-ào) "媽祖臺," (māzǔ tái) "祖媽宮," (zǔ mā gōng) and "馬祖澳," (mǎzǔ ào) with "媽宮" being the most common.

Since the settlement's temple honoring the Chinese goddess Mazu, existed on the island during the Wanli period of the Ming Dynasty, "Magong" is likely related to the Mazu faith, and its name subsequently expanded from a local temple to a general place name. The deified form of Lin Moniang from medieval Fujian Province, is usually accounted the oldest in all of Taiwan and Penghu.

During the japanese occupation of Taiwan, the town Makeng was the center of the Mako Guard District. In 1920, the eighth Governor-General of Taiwan, Den Kenjirō, promoted administrative reform, reorganizing the former Penghu Prefecture into Penghu County. The town Makeng (Chinese: 媽宮; Pe̍h-ōe-jī: Má-keng; lit. 'Mazu's palace') under the jurisdiction of Penghu County was renamed Makō (馬公) a name that remains in use today.

After 1945, the Wade-Giles romanization Makung was used. Taiwan officially adopted Tongyong Pinyin in 2002 and Hanyu Pinyin in 2009, leading to the romanization Magong.

Since then there has been a growing demand among the people of Magong City to restore the name. Many people believe that the name "Māgōng" (媽宮) has a sense of continuity in the city's history and advocate restoring the name from "Mǎgōng City" (馬公市) to "Māgōng City". (媽宮市) This would also make it easier for future generations to trace the cultural origins of their hometown.

== History ==
The island's Mazu temple was erected in the late 16th or early 17th century. After the Qing government took control of Penghu, Magong Street, being near the harbor, was frequently garrisoned by troops and could accommodate ships year-round.

Frequent commercial activity led to its development into a bustling market town, forming what was known as "seven streets and one market" during the Qianlong era.

Market activities were largely controlled by government officials and soldiers. Approximately seven military battalions were stationed in Penghu, each with its own temples, inns, and kitchens scattered around Magong, creating a chaotic mix of military and civilian populations.

After the Daoguang era, local education and commerce flourished, and by the Guangxu era, Magong had grown into a complex of "ten streets and two markets."

Under Japanese rule, the settlement was renamed Makō and organized as a subprefecture of Hōko. The area was a major base of the Imperial Japanese Navy. It was an embarkation point for the invasion of the Philippines during the Second World War.

On 25 December 1981, Makung was upgraded from an urban township to a county-administered city. Land reclamation was carried out on the northeastern shoal of Magong Port (the area south of present-day Xinsheng Road), and the construction of the Magong Third Fishing Port area was completed in 1993. Since 2020, plans have been made to reclaim land from the Anshan Shoal area and the area north of Cetian Island to address the issue of large cruise ships being unable to dock.

In 1986 Typhoon Wayne (1986) severely affected the Penghu archipelago (including Magong City) when it struck Taiwan around August 22. The fierce winds and high waves generated by the storm caused heavy structural damage across the islands, recorded extreme gusts exceeding 68 m/s, and even reshaped local geography, helping form nearby coastal sandbars such as Pengpeng Beach. After that President Chiang Ching-kuo regularly traveled to Magong to inspect both naval deployments and civilian infrastructure development. Presidential directives and central inspections were dispatched to coordinate local reconstruction, repair damaged harbors, and restore public utilities across Penghu.

President Lee Teng-hui conducted a historic, highly defiant military inspection of Magong and the Penghu garrison on March 14, 1996, during the peak of the Third Taiwan Strait Crisis.

== Administration ==
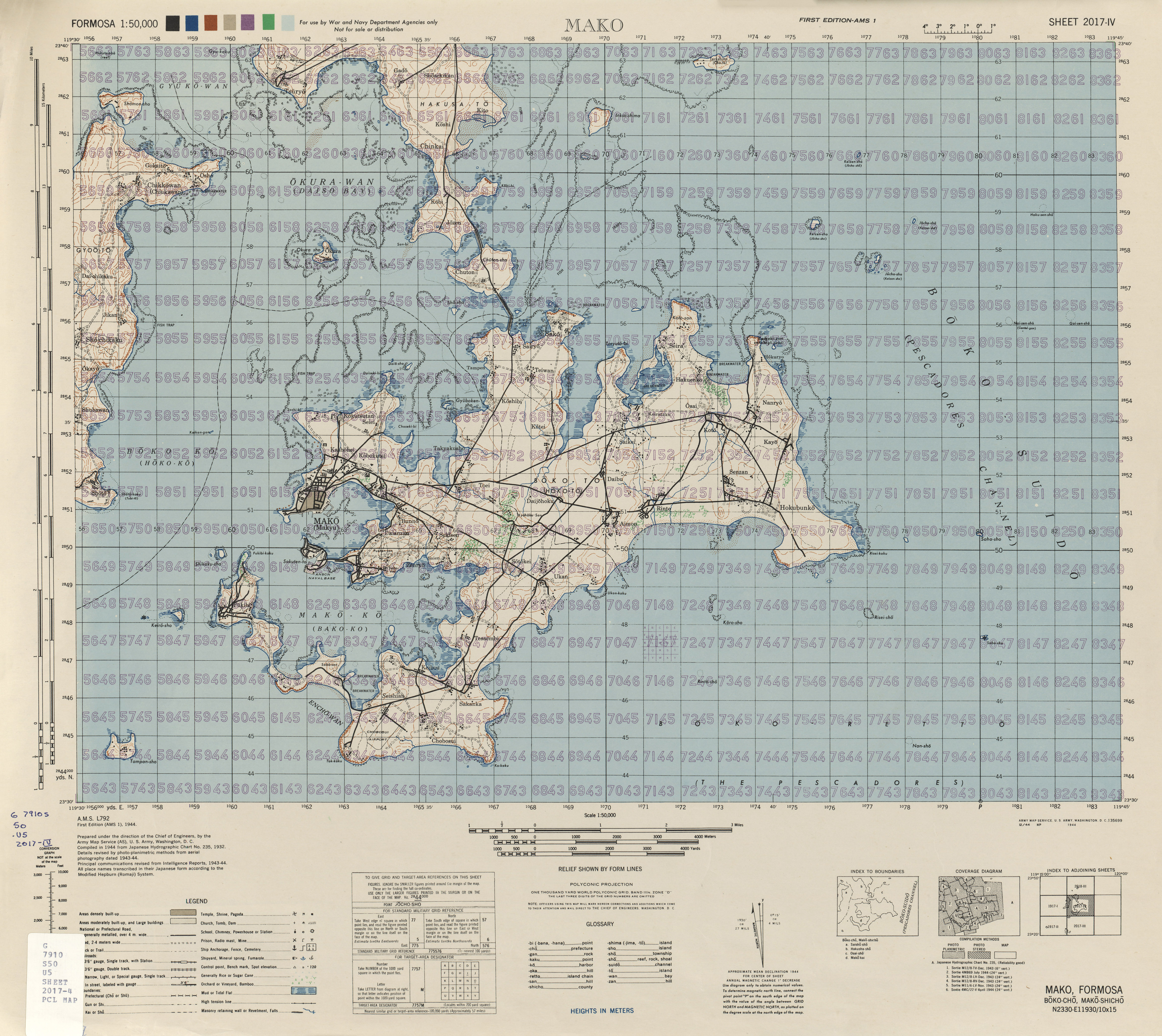
Map of Magong (labeled as MAKŌ (Makyu)) and surrounding area (1944)

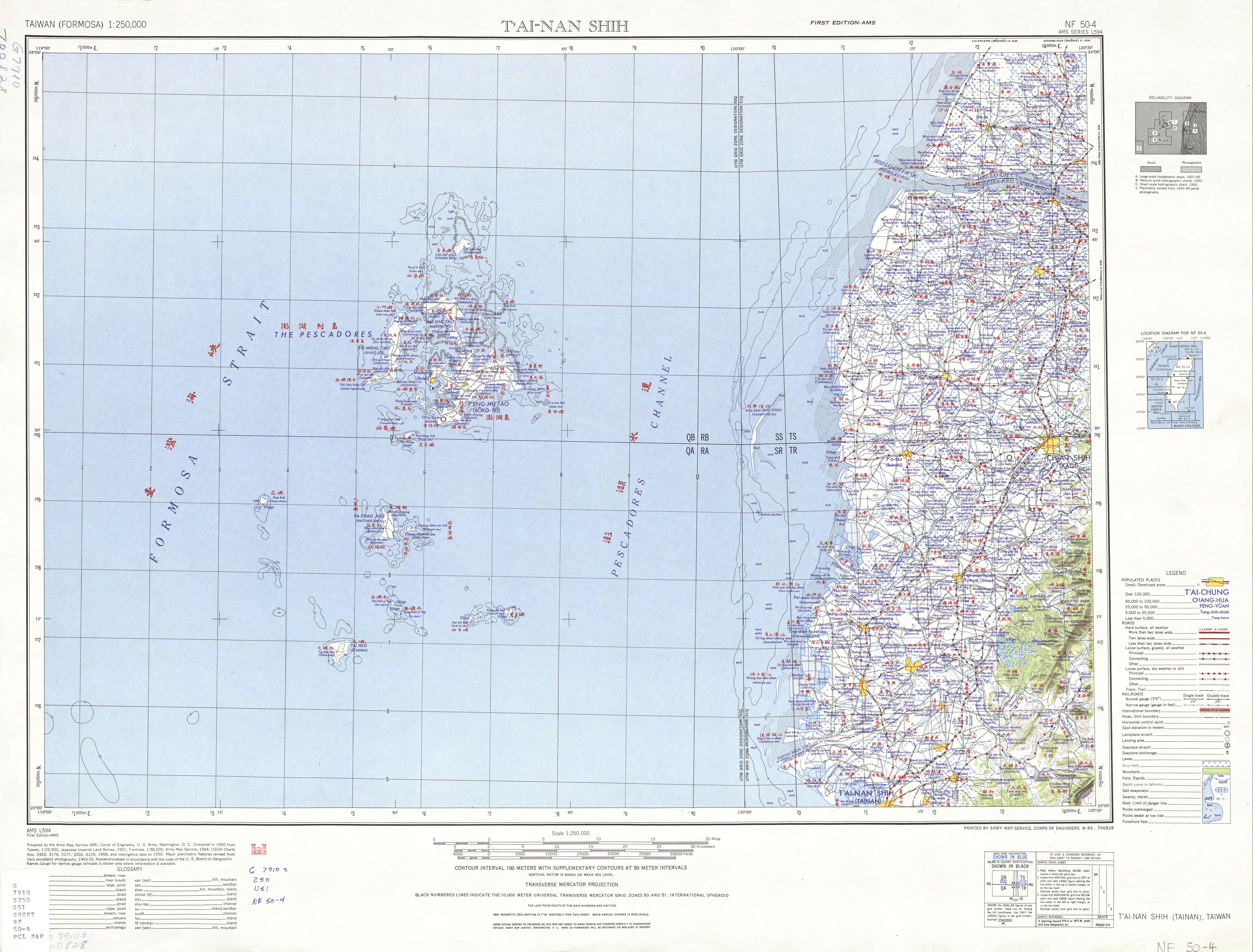
Map including Magong (labeled as Makung (Bakō)) (1950)

Magong City contains 33 municipal villages (里; lǐ):

(Romanizations are in Hanyu Pinyin)

- Fuxing (復興里)
- Chang'an (長安里)
- Zhongyang (中央里)
- Qiming (啟明里)
- Chongqing (重慶里)
- Zhongxing (中興里)
- Guangfu (光復里)
- Guangming (光明里)
- Guangrong (光榮里)
- Chaoyang (朝陽里)
- Yangming (陽明里)
- Chongguang (重光里)
- Xiwei (西衛里)
- Xiwen (西文里)
- Dongwen (東文里)
- Anshan (案山里)
- Guanghua (光華里)
- Qianliao (前寮里)
- Shiquan (石泉里)
- Caiyuan (菜園里)
- Dongwei (東衛里)
- Anzhe (安宅里)
- Xingren (興仁里)
- Wukan (烏崁里)
- Tiexian (鐵線里)
- Suogang (鎖港里)
- Shanshui (山水里)
- Wude (五德里)
- Jing'an (井垵里)
- Shili (時里奇)
- Fenggui (風櫃里)
- Hujing (虎井里) centred on Hujing Islet (虎井嶼; Hóo-tsínn-sū)
- Tongpan (桶盤里) centred on Tongpan Island (桶盤嶼; Tháng-puânn-sū)

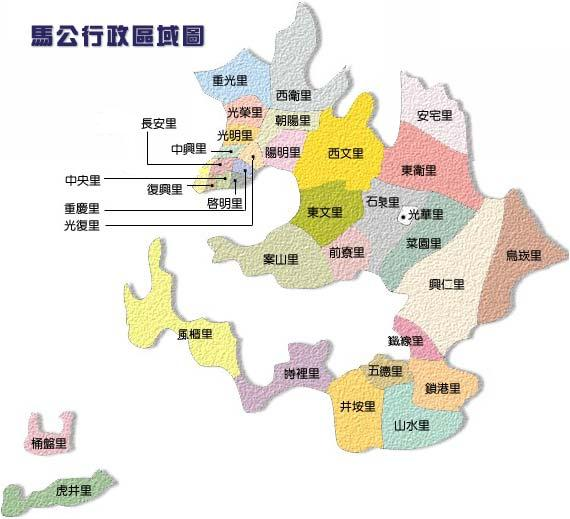
Magong City Administrative Divisions

== Government institutions ==
- Penghu County Council

== Education ==
- National Penghu University of Science and Technology

== Energy ==
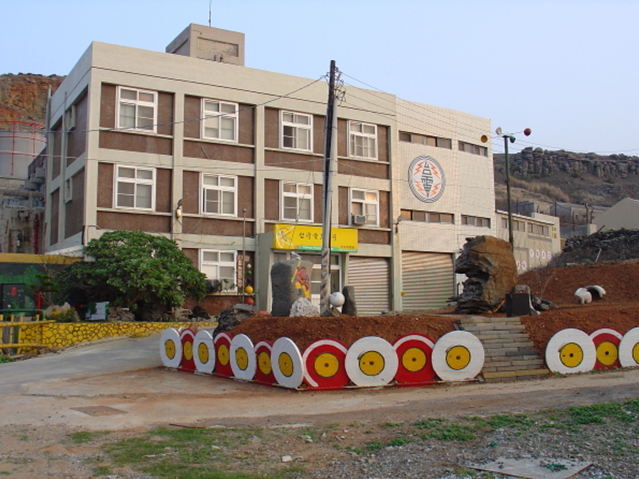
Hujing Power Plant

The city is powered by the Hujing Power Plant located on Table Island.

== Climate ==
Magong has a very warm humid subtropical climate under the Köppen system. Due to the maritime influence, diurnal temperature variation is very low, but in spite of being right on the boundary with the tropics and having 15 °C (59 °F) winter lows it falls short of being such a climate. This is courtesy of the influence of the cool Asian landmass and prevailing winds in winter. As a result, the coldest month just falls short of the 18 °C (64 °F) isotherm. In summer, Magong receives monsoonal rainfall with moderated but hot temperatures. While afternoons most often stay in the low 30's Celsius, nights remain above 25 °C (77 °F) for several months. It is drier than many mainland areas of Taiwan, although it still frequently is cloudy.

Climate data for Magong City (1991–2020 normals, extremes 1897–present）
Month	Jan	Feb	Mar	Apr	May	Jun	Jul	Aug	Sep	Oct	Nov	Dec	Year
Record high °C (°F)	28.6 (83.5)	29.5 (85.1)	30.8 (87.4)	33.0 (91.4)	34.2 (93.6)	35.9 (96.6)	36.7 (98.1)	35.2 (95.4)	35.1 (95.2)	35.3 (95.5)	31.1 (88.0)	30.0 (86.0)	36.7 (98.1)
Mean daily maximum °C (°F)	19.4 (66.9)	20.0 (68.0)	22.9 (73.2)	26.3 (79.3)	29.1 (84.4)	30.9 (87.6)	32.2 (90.0)	31.8 (89.2)	31.0 (87.8)	28.2 (82.8)	25.1 (77.2)	21.3 (70.3)	26.5 (79.7)
Daily mean °C (°F)	17.1 (62.8)	17.4 (63.3)	19.9 (67.8)	23.2 (73.8)	25.9 (78.6)	27.9 (82.2)	28.9 (84.0)	28.6 (83.5)	28.0 (82.4)	25.5 (77.9)	22.7 (72.9)	19.1 (66.4)	23.7 (74.6)
Mean daily minimum °C (°F)	15.5 (59.9)	15.6 (60.1)	17.8 (64.0)	21.1 (70.0)	24.0 (75.2)	25.9 (78.6)	26.7 (80.1)	26.6 (79.9)	26.1 (79.0)	24.0 (75.2)	21.3 (70.3)	17.7 (63.9)	21.9 (71.4)
Record low °C (°F)	7.7 (45.9)	7.2 (45.0)	7.4 (45.3)	10.5 (50.9)	16.6 (61.9)	19.3 (66.7)	21.8 (71.2)	21.1 (70.0)	19.2 (66.6)	15.0 (59.0)	9.6 (49.3)	9.0 (48.2)	7.2 (45.0)
Average precipitation mm (inches)	20.9 (0.82)	38.1 (1.50)	50.7 (2.00)	77.9 (3.07)	117.8 (4.64)	148.0 (5.83)	163.2 (6.43)	229.4 (9.03)	100.3 (3.95)	30.1 (1.19)	26.0 (1.02)	28.1 (1.11)	1,030.5 (40.59)
Average precipitation days (≥ 0.1 mm)	5.2	6.2	7.6	8.7	9.3	10.2	8.1	9.4	5.6	2.4	3.6	4.8	81.1
Average relative humidity (%)	78.7	80.7	80.0	80.9	82.8	85.2	83.6	84.4	79.6	75.2	76.8	76.8	80.4
Mean monthly sunshine hours	102.9	98.7	131.1	153.1	183.6	211.2	265.3	231.4	214.9	186.4	129.2	111.4	2,019.2
Source: Central Weather Bureau

== Tourist attractions ==
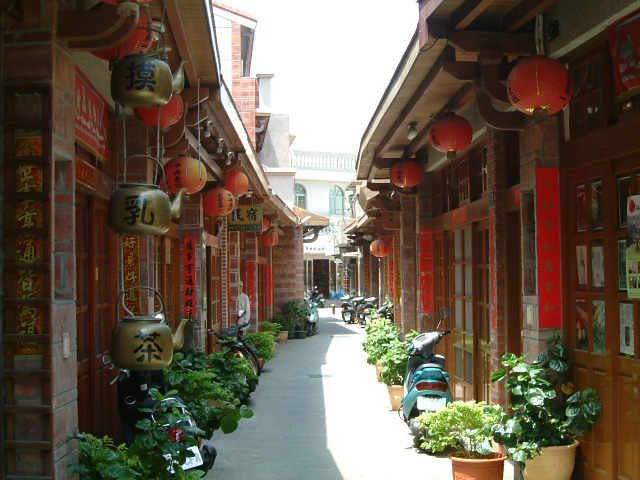
Central Street in the old town of Magong

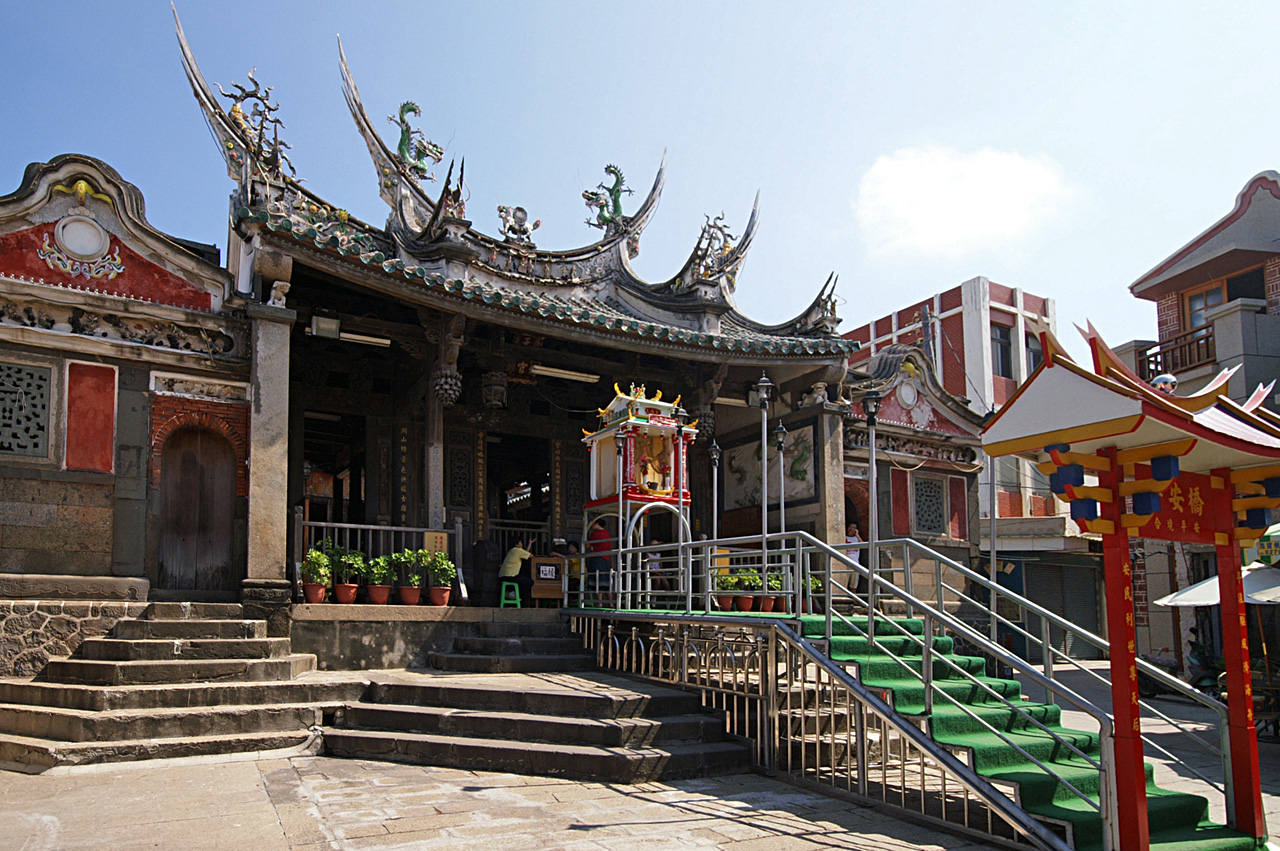
Mazu Temple

- Central Street
- Chang Yu-sheng Memorial Museum
- Erdai Art Hall
- Fenggui Cave
- Fengguiwei Fort
- First Guesthouse
- Four-eyed Well
- Jinguitou Fortress
- Magong Beiji Temple
- Magong Old City Wall
- Mazu Temple
- Ocean Resources Museum
- Penghu Living Museum
- Penghu Reclamation Hall
- Pier 3
- Shigong Temple
- Suogang Fishing Port

== Transportation ==
Penghu Airport operates domestic flights and Magong Harbor hosts ferry connections to Kaohsiung, Tainan, Chiayi and Kinmen.

== Notable natives ==
- Chang Yu-sheng, former singer, composer and producer
- Pan An-bang, former singer, TV presenter and actor
- Tsai Chih-chan, poet and educator
