= Penghu =

Archipelago and county of Taiwan

Penghu Islands 澎湖縣 Pescadores
- County
- Penghu County
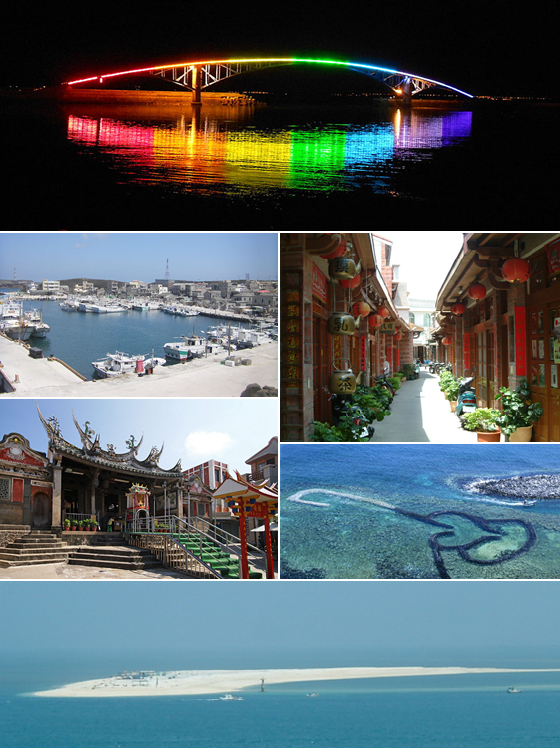
- Clockwise from the top: A night view of Xiying Rainbow Bridge, Zhongyang Old Street, Qimei Double-Heart of Stacked Stones, Baisha Beach, Penghu Tianhou Temple, Budai Harbor

- Flag Logo

- Coordinates: 23°34′03″N 119°34′39″E
- Country: Republic of China (Taiwan)
- Province: Taiwan^{a}
- Seat: Magong City
- Largest city: Magong
- Boroughs: One city, five rural townships

Government
  - Body: Penghu County Government; Penghu County Council
  - County Magistrate: Chen Kuang-fu (DPP)

Area
  - Total: 141.052 km^{2} (54.460 sq mi)
  - Rank: 22 of 22

Population (December 2014)
  - Total: 101,758
  - Rank: 21 of 22
  - Density: 721.422/km^{2} (1,868.47/sq mi)
- Time zone: UTC+8 (National Standard Time)
- ISO 3166 code: TW-PEN
- Website: www.penghu.gov.tw
- Symbols
- Bird: Small Skylark (Alauda gulgula)
- Flower: Firewheel (Gaillardia pulchella)
- Tree: Chinese Banyan (Ficus microcarpa)
- ^{a} In Taiwan, provinces remain a nominal division according to the Taiwanese constitution, but are no longer considered to have any administrative function practically.

Penghu Islands
- Traditional Chinese: 澎湖群島
- Postal: Pescadores Islands
Transcriptions
Standard Mandarin
- Hanyu Pinyin: Pénghú Qúndǎo
- Bopomofo: ㄆㄥˊ ㄏㄨˊ ㄑㄩㄣˊ ㄉㄠˇ
- Gwoyeu Romatzyh: Pernghwu Chyundao
- Wade–Giles: Pʻêng^{2}-hu^{2} Chʻün^{2}-tao^{3}
- Tongyong Pinyin: Pénghú Cyúndǎo
- Yale Romanization: Pénghú Chyúndǎu
- MPS2: Pénghú Chiúndǎu
- IPA: [pʰə̌ŋ.xǔ tɕʰy̌n.tàʊ]
Southern Min
- Hokkien POJ: Phîⁿ-ô͘-kûn-tó or Phêⁿ-ô͘-kûn-tó
- Tâi-lô: Phînn-ôo-kûn-tó or Phênn-ôo-kûn-tó

Penghu Island
- Traditional Chinese: 澎湖島
Transcriptions
Standard Mandarin
- Hanyu Pinyin: Pénghú Dǎo
- Bopomofo: ㄆㄥˊ ㄏㄨˊ ㄉㄠˇ
- Gwoyeu Romatzyh: Pernghwu Dao
- Wade–Giles: Pʻêng^{2}-hu^{2} Tao^{3}
- Tongyong Pinyin: Pénghú Dǎo
- Yale Romanization: Pénghú Dǎu
- MPS2: Pénghú Dǎu
- IPA: [pʰə̌ŋ.xǔ tàʊ]
Southern Min
- Hokkien POJ: Phîⁿ-ô͘-tó or Phêⁿ-ô͘-tó
- Tâi-lô: Phînn-ôo-tó or Phênn-ôo-tó

Penghu County
- Traditional Chinese: 澎湖縣
Transcriptions
Standard Mandarin
- Hanyu Pinyin: Pénghú Xiàn
- Bopomofo: ㄆㄥˊ ㄏㄨˊ ㄒㄧㄢˋ
- Gwoyeu Romatzyh: Pernghwu Shiann
- Wade–Giles: Pʻêng^{2}-hu^{2} Hsien^{4}
- Tongyong Pinyin: Pénghú Siàn
- Yale Romanization: Pénghú Syàn
- MPS2: Pénghú Shiàn
- IPA: [pʰə̌ŋ.xǔ ɕjɛ̂n]
Hakka
- Pha̍k-fa-sṳ: Phàng-fù-yen
Southern Min
- Hokkien POJ: Phîⁿ-ô͘-koān or Phêⁿ-ô͘-koān
- Tâi-lô: Phînn-ôo-kuān or Phênn-ôo-kuān

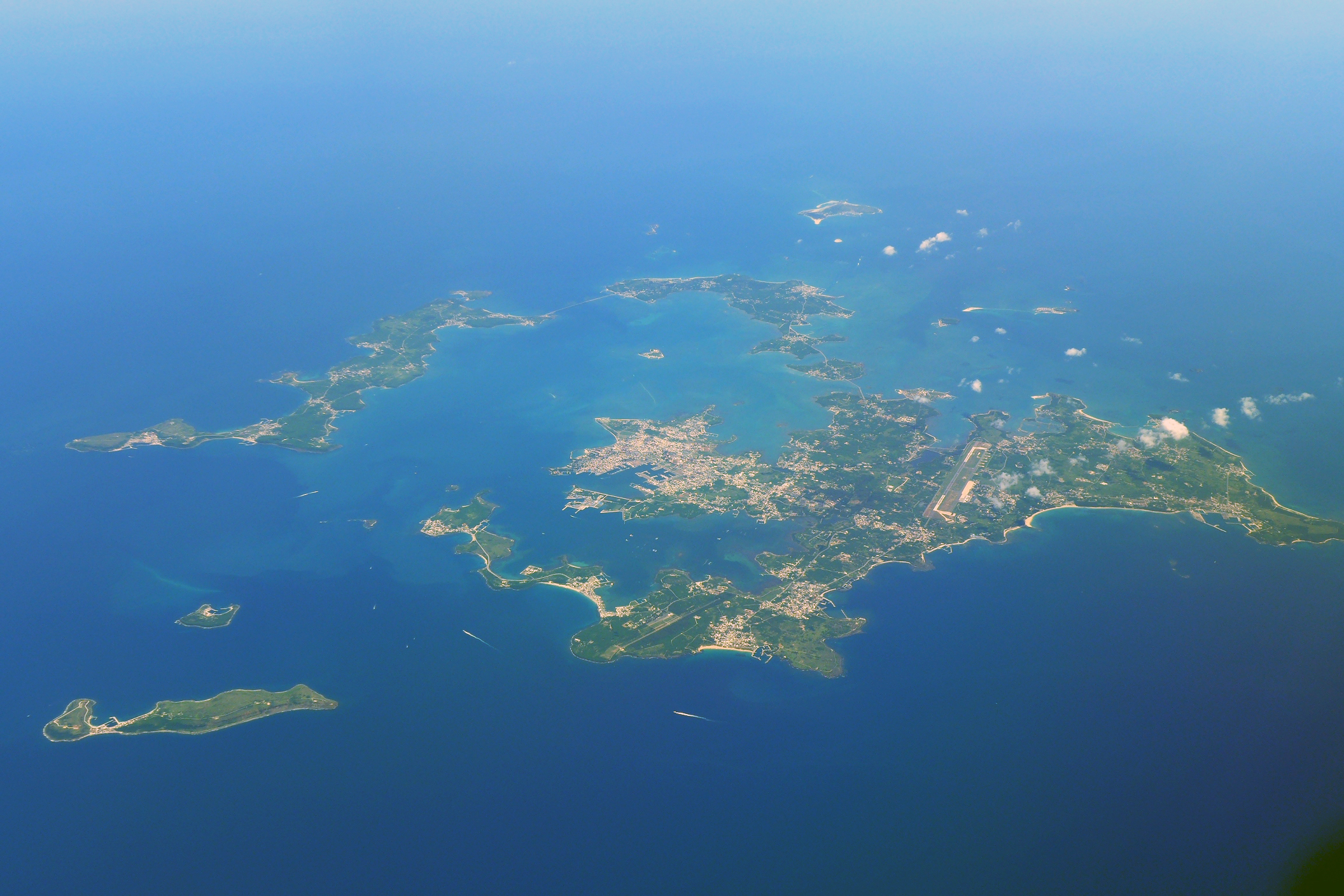
Northern islands of Penghu (the Pescadores)

The Penghu (/ˈpʌŋˈhuː/ PUNG-HOO, Hokkien POJ: Phîⁿ-ô͘ or Phêⁿ-ô͘ ) or Pescadores Islands are an archipelago of 90 islands and islets in the Taiwan Strait, about 50 kilometres (25 nautical miles) west of the main island of Taiwan across the Penghu Channel, covering an area of 141 km^{2} (54 sq mi). The archipelago collectively forms Penghu County. The largest city is Magong, on the largest island.

The Penghu islands first appear in the historical record in the Tang dynasty and were inhabited by Chinese people under the Song dynasty, during which they were attached to Jinjiang County of Fujian. The archipelago was formally incorporated as an administrative unit of China in 1281 under Tong'an County. It continued to be controlled by Imperial China with brief European occupations by the Dutch (1622–1624) and Second French colonial empire (1885), until it was ceded to the Japanese in 1895. The Surrender of Japan in 1945 ended its rule of the archipelago, which has since been governed by the Republic of China (ROC). Under the terms of the Sino-American Mutual Defense Treaty and the subsequent Taiwan Relations Act between the ROC and the United States, Penghu is defined and geographically acknowledged as part of Taiwan.

Penghu Islands rely solely on sea and air transportation, with air transport having a significant role in outside access. The islands are served by three local domestic airports: Penghu Airport, Qimei Airport, and Wang-an Airport. The Penghu National Scenic Area comprises most of the islands and islets of the archipelago. It is also renowned for its unique natural feature of columnar basalt landscape. Tourism is one of the main sources of income to the county.

== Name ==
The "Penghu" islands were mentioned in a series of poems from the Tang dynasty (618–907). In the Song dynasty (960–1279), it was mentioned that in the Tang period, "Pinghu" barbarians from beyond Quanzhou had laid siege to Fuzhou, now the capital of Fujian Province. In 1171, poet Lou Yue described a place across the sea from Quanzhou, identified as Penghu, that had thousands of sandbars called "Pinghu" (flat lake) because of the "encircling shape of its inner coastline". Song sources describe migrants from Fujian cultivating land on Pinghu. In 1225, the Song historian Zhao Rukuo called the islands attached to Jinjiang County "Penghu". In 1227, Wang Xiangzhi described Penghu as a group of 36 islands in an "outlying region" which took three days to reach by sailing from Jinjiang. In the Southern Min language, both Pinghu and Penghu are pronounced similarly, and scholars in Taiwan believe them to be the same place. In Southern Min it is pronounced Phêⁿ-ô·.

According to the official Penghu County Chronicle, Penghu's original name had been "Pinghu" (平湖), but as "Ping" (平) sounded similar to "Peng" (彭) in Hokkien, "Pinghu" (平湖) was also written as "Penghu" (彭湖), and ultimately the consensus, is to write "Penghu" (澎湖). The islands have also been called Pehoe from the Minnan name Phêⁿ-ô·.

The name "Pescadores" comes from the Portuguese name Ilhas dos Pescadores ("Fishermen Islands"). The European Portuguese pronunciation is [pɨʃkɐˈðoɾɨʃ] but, in English, it is typically closer to /ˌpɛskəˈdɔːrɪz, -iːz/.

== History ==
=== Prehistory ===
Penghu 1, a fossil jaw (mandible) dating to the Middle or Late Pleistocene that belonged to a member of an extinct hominin species, possibly a Denisovan, was discovered in the Penghu Channel c. 2008.

Finds of fine red cord-marked pottery at Guoye, Huxi, indicate that Penghu was visited by Austronesians from southwestern Taiwan around 5,000 years ago, though not settled permanently.

=== Song dynasty ===
Han Chinese from southern Fujian began to establish fishing communities on the islands in the 9th and 10th centuries, and representatives were intermittently stationed there by the Southern Song and Yuan governments from c. 1170. Chinese fishermen had settled on the Penghu Islands by 1171, when a group of "Bisheye" bandits with dark skin speaking a foreign language landed on Penghu and plundered the fields planted by Chinese migrants. The Song government sent soldiers after them and from that time on, Song patrols regularly visited Penghu in the spring and summer. A local official, Wang Dayou had houses built on Penghu and stationed troops there to prevent depredations by the Bisheye. Coins dating to the Xining (1068–1077) and Zhenghe (1111–1117) reign periods as well as many Song pottery and porcelain shards have been unearthed in Penghu.

In 1225, the Book of Barbarian Nations anecdotally indicated that Penghu was attached to Jinjiang, Quanzhou Prefecture. A group of Quanzhou immigrants lived on Penghu.

=== Yuan dynasty ===
In November 1281, the Yuan dynasty under Emperor Shizu officially established the Penghu Patrol and Inspection Agency under the jurisdiction of Tong'an County, incorporating Penghu into China's borders 403 years earlier than Taiwan.

Wang Dayuan gave a detailed first-hand account of the islands in his Daoyi Zhilüe (1349).

There are thirty-six islands, large and small, so close together that the slopes of one are visible from another. Among them are seven harbors which are named. With a favoring wind they can be reached from Ch'üan-chou in two days and nights. There is grass but no trees; the land is barren and not suited for growing rice. The Ch'üan-chou people make their houses by thatching grass. The weather is always warm. The customs [of the residents] are rustic. Many of the people are long-lived [or, the people are mostly old]. Men and women both wear long cloth gowns girded with local cotton cloth. They boil sea [water] to get salt, and ferment millet to make liquor. They gather fish, shrimp, snails, and clams to supplement their [staple of grain]. They burn ox dung to cook fish fat for use as oil. The land produces sesame and green beans. The goats multiply into flocks of several tens of thousands. A family [which owns some goats] brands their hair and cuts their horns as marks of identification, but does not gather them in during the day or night, so that they all forage for themselves. Their workmen and merchants enjoy the profits of a flourishing trade.
The territory is attached to Chin-chiang county [hsien] of Ch'üan-chou [prefecture]. During the reign-period Chih-yüan 至元 [1280-1294] a sub-county magistrate was assigned there to be in charge of the annual tax fixed on salt; during the Chung-t'ung 中統 reign-period [1260-1279] this amounted to ten ingots [ting 錠] and twenty-five ounces. No other tax or corvée is levied.

— Wang Dayuan

=== Ming dynasty ===
In the 15th century, the Ming ordered the evacuation of the islands as part of their maritime ban. When these restrictions were removed in the late 16th century, legal fishing communities, most of which hailed from Tong'an County, were re-established on the islands. These fishermen worshiped at the Mazu Temple that gave Magong its name and themselves gave rise to the Portuguese name Pescadores. The Ming established a permanent military presence starting in 1597.

At this time, the Dutch East India Company was trying to force China to open a port in Fujian to Dutch trade and expel the Portuguese from Macau. When the Dutch were defeated by the Portuguese at the Battle of Macau in 1622, they seized Penghu, built a fort there, and threatened raids on Chinese ports and shipping unless the Chinese allowed trading with them on Penghu and that China not trade with Manila. In response, the Chinese governor of Fujian demanded that the Dutch withdraw from Penghu to Taiwan, where the Chinese would permit them to engage in trade. The Dutch continued to raid the Fujian coast between October 1622 and January 1624 to force their demands, but were unsuccessful. In 1624, the new governor of Fujian sent a fleet of 40–50 warships with 5,000 troops to Penghu and expelled the Dutch, who moved to Fort Zeelandia on Taiwan.

=== Qing dynasty ===
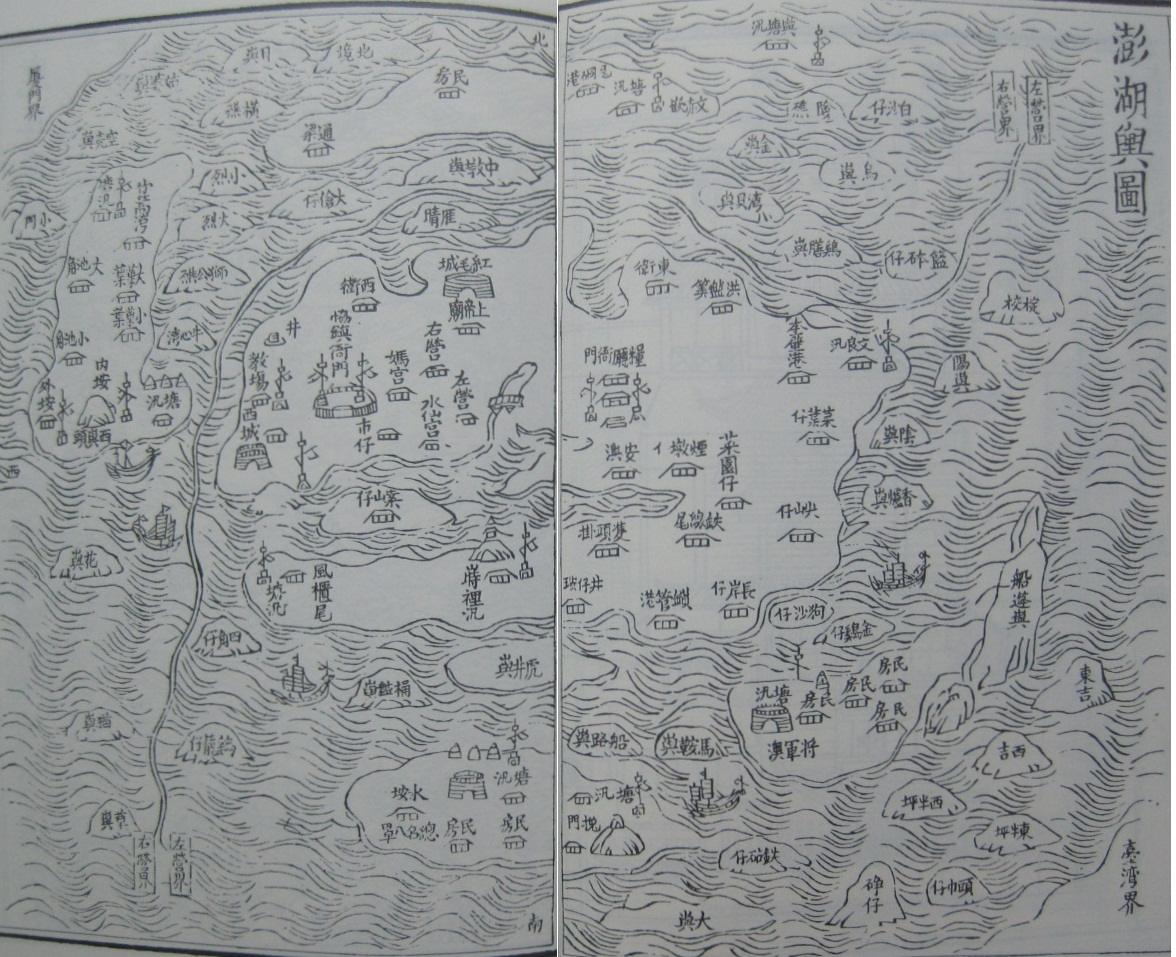
Map of Penghu, 1752

For a period in the mid-17th century, Taiwan and the archipelago were ruled by the Kingdom of Tungning under the Zheng family, which was overthrown by the Qing dynasty in 1683 after the Battle of Penghu. Military personnel were stationed on Penghu afterwards. Penghu became a sub-prefecture of Taiwan Prefecture, Fujian Province, in the Qing period.

The Penghu archipelago was captured by the French in March 1885, in the closing weeks of the Sino-French War, and evacuated four months later. The Pescadores Campaign was the last campaign of Admiral Amédée Courbet, whose naval victories in the war had made him a national hero in France. Courbet was among several French soldiers and sailors who died of cholera during the French occupation of Penghu. He died aboard his flagship Bayard in Makung harbour on 11 June 1885.

=== Empire of Japan ===
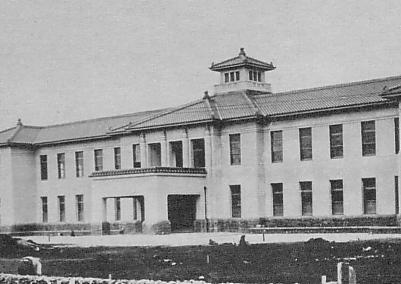
Hōko Prefecture Government building

Towards the end of the First Sino-Japanese War, having defeated the Qing in northern China, Japan sought to ensure that it obtained Penghu and Taiwan in the final settlement. In March 1895, the Japanese defeated the Chinese garrison on the islands and occupied Makung. The Japanese rule of Penghu, with its fine harbor, gave the Imperial Japanese Navy an advanced base from which their short-range coal-burning ships could control the Taiwan Straits and thus prevent more Chinese troops from being sent to Taiwan. This action persuaded the Chinese negotiators at Shimonoseki that Japan was determined to annex Taiwan, and, after Penghu, Taiwan and the Liaodong Peninsula had been ceded to Japan in the Sino-Japanese Treaty of Shimonoseki in April, helped to ensure the success of the Japanese invasion of Taiwan in May.

Penghu County was then called the Hōko Prefecture by the Japanese government of Taiwan. In World War II, Makō (Makung) was a major base for the Imperial Japanese Navy and the embarkation point for the invasion of the Philippines.

In 1944, Penghu was extensively bombed in the Penghu air raids.

=== Republic of China ===
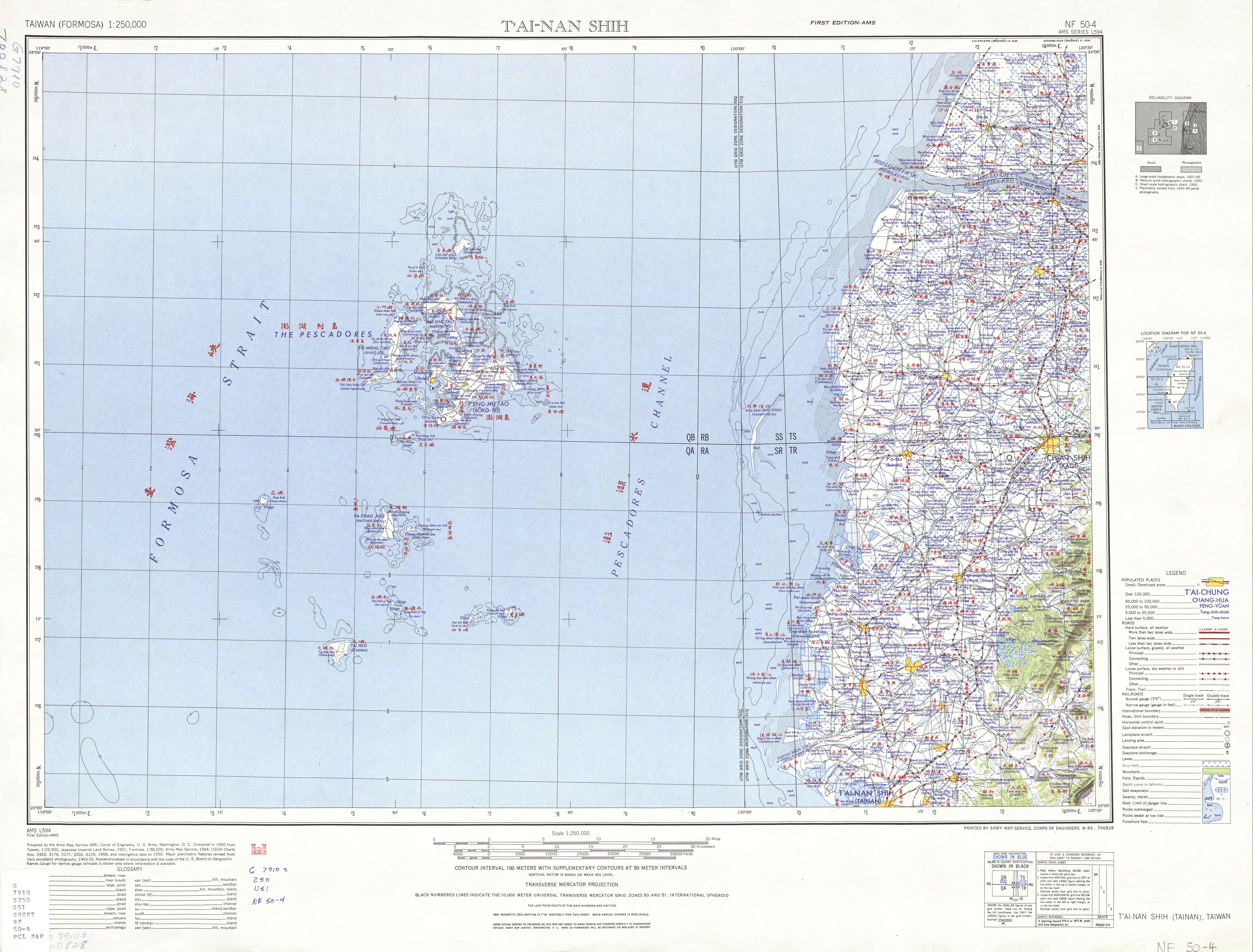
The Pescadores (1950)

In the Cairo Declaration of 1943, the United States, the United Kingdom and China stated it to be their purpose that "all the territories that Japan has stolen from the Chinese, such as Formosa and The Pescadores, shall be restored to the Republic of China". On 26 July 1945, the three governments issued the Potsdam Declaration, declaring that "the terms of the Cairo Declaration shall be carried out". However, the United States and the United Kingdom have regarded the aforementioned documents as merely wartime statements of intention with no binding force in law.

Following the surrender of Japan on 2 September 1945, Supreme Commander of the Allied Powers Douglas MacArthur issued General Order No. 1, which directed Japanese forces to surrender to the Allied Powers and facilitate the occupation of Japanese territories by the Allied Powers. The Office of the Supreme Commander for the Allied Powers ordered Japanese forces in China and Taiwan to surrender to Chiang Kai-shek, who the Allied Powers delegated to accept the surrender. On 25 October 1945, Governor-General Rikichi Andō handed over the administration of Taiwan and the Penghu islands to the head of the Taiwan Investigation Commission, Chen Yi.

The Republic of China and Japan signed the Treaty of Taipei on 28 April 1952, and the treaty came into force on 5 August, which is considered by some as giving a legal support to the Republic of China's claim to Taiwan as "de jure" territory. The treaty stipulates that all treaties, conventions, and agreements between China and Japan prior to 9 December 1941 were null and void, which according to Hungdah Chiu, abolishes the Treaty of Shimonoseki ceding Taiwan to Japan. In the 1956 Japan v. Lai Chin Jung case, it was stated that Taiwan and the Penghu islands came to belong to the ROC on the date the Treaty of Taipei came into force.

However, in 1954, the United States denied that the sovereignty over Taiwan and the Penghu islands had been settled by the Treaty of Taipei. In the following year, the United States also stated its position that Taiwan and Penghu were handed over to the Allied Powers, and that the Republic of China was merely asked to administer these territories for the Allied Powers pending a final decision as to their ownership. In the 1960 Sheng v. Rogers case, it was stated that, in the view of the U.S. State Department, no agreement has purported to transfer the sovereignty of Taiwan to the ROC, though it accepted the exercise of Chinese authority over Taiwan and recognized the Government of the Republic of China as the legal government of China at the time.

Boat people fleeing Vietnam in the 1970s and 1980s who were rescued by Taiwan's ships in the South China Sea were sent to Penghu.

On 20 November 1971 China Airlines Flight 825, a Sud Aviation Caravelle aircraft flying from Songshan Airport to Kai Tak, disintegrated in mid-air due to a bomb explosion and the plane crashed in the South China Sea. The bombing was never determined by legal inquiry and all 25 passengers and crew on board were killed.

On 25 May 2002, China Airlines Flight 611, a Boeing 747-200 aircraft flying from Taipei to Hong Kong, disintegrated and exploded over the Islands. The wreckage slammed into the Taiwan Strait, a couple of miles off the coast. All 225 passengers and crew on board were killed.

On 21 December 2002, TransAsia Airways Flight 791, an ATR 72 aircraft flying from Taipei Taoyuan International Airport to Macau International Airport crashed into the sea 17 kilometers southwest of Magong due to Icing in the Airplane, killing the two crew members.

On 23 July 2014, TransAsia Airways Flight 222, an ATR 72 aircraft flying from Kaohsiung International Airport to Penghu Airport crashed in bad weather killing 48 out of 58 on board and injuring 5 people on ground.

== Climate ==
Penghu County has a dry-winter humid subtropical climate (Köppen climate classification: Cwa), bordering on a regular humid subtropical climate (Köppen climate classification: Cfa).

Climate data for Penghu (1991–2020 normals, extremes 1897–present)
Month	Jan	Feb	Mar	Apr	May	Jun	Jul	Aug	Sep	Oct	Nov	Dec	Year
Record high °C (°F)	28.6 (83.5)	29.5 (85.1)	30.8 (87.4)	33.0 (91.4)	34.2 (93.6)	35.9 (96.6)	36.7 (98.1)	35.2 (95.4)	35.1 (95.2)	35.3 (95.5)	31.1 (88.0)	30.0 (86.0)	36.7 (98.1)
Mean daily maximum °C (°F)	19.4 (66.9)	20.0 (68.0)	22.9 (73.2)	26.3 (79.3)	29.1 (84.4)	30.9 (87.6)	32.2 (90.0)	31.8 (89.2)	31.0 (87.8)	28.2 (82.8)	25.1 (77.2)	21.3 (70.3)	26.5 (79.7)
Daily mean °C (°F)	17.1 (62.8)	17.4 (63.3)	19.9 (67.8)	23.2 (73.8)	25.9 (78.6)	27.9 (82.2)	28.9 (84.0)	28.6 (83.5)	28.0 (82.4)	25.5 (77.9)	22.7 (72.9)	19.1 (66.4)	23.7 (74.6)
Mean daily minimum °C (°F)	15.5 (59.9)	15.6 (60.1)	17.8 (64.0)	21.1 (70.0)	24.0 (75.2)	25.9 (78.6)	26.7 (80.1)	26.6 (79.9)	26.1 (79.0)	24.0 (75.2)	21.3 (70.3)	17.7 (63.9)	21.9 (71.4)
Record low °C (°F)	7.7 (45.9)	7.2 (45.0)	7.4 (45.3)	10.5 (50.9)	16.6 (61.9)	19.3 (66.7)	21.8 (71.2)	21.1 (70.0)	19.2 (66.6)	15.0 (59.0)	9.6 (49.3)	9.0 (48.2)	7.2 (45.0)
Average precipitation mm (inches)	20.9 (0.82)	38.1 (1.50)	50.7 (2.00)	77.9 (3.07)	117.8 (4.64)	148.0 (5.83)	163.2 (6.43)	229.4 (9.03)	100.3 (3.95)	30.1 (1.19)	26.0 (1.02)	28.1 (1.11)	1,030.5 (40.59)
Average precipitation days (≥ 0.1 mm)	5.2	6.2	7.6	8.7	9.3	10.2	8.1	9.4	5.6	2.4	3.6	4.8	81.1
Average relative humidity (%)	78.7	80.7	80.0	80.9	82.8	85.2	83.6	84.4	79.6	75.2	76.8	76.8	80.4
Mean monthly sunshine hours	102.9	98.7	131.1	153.1	183.6	211.2	265.3	231.4	214.9	186.4	129.2	111.4	2,019.2
Source: Central Weather Bureau

== Geology ==
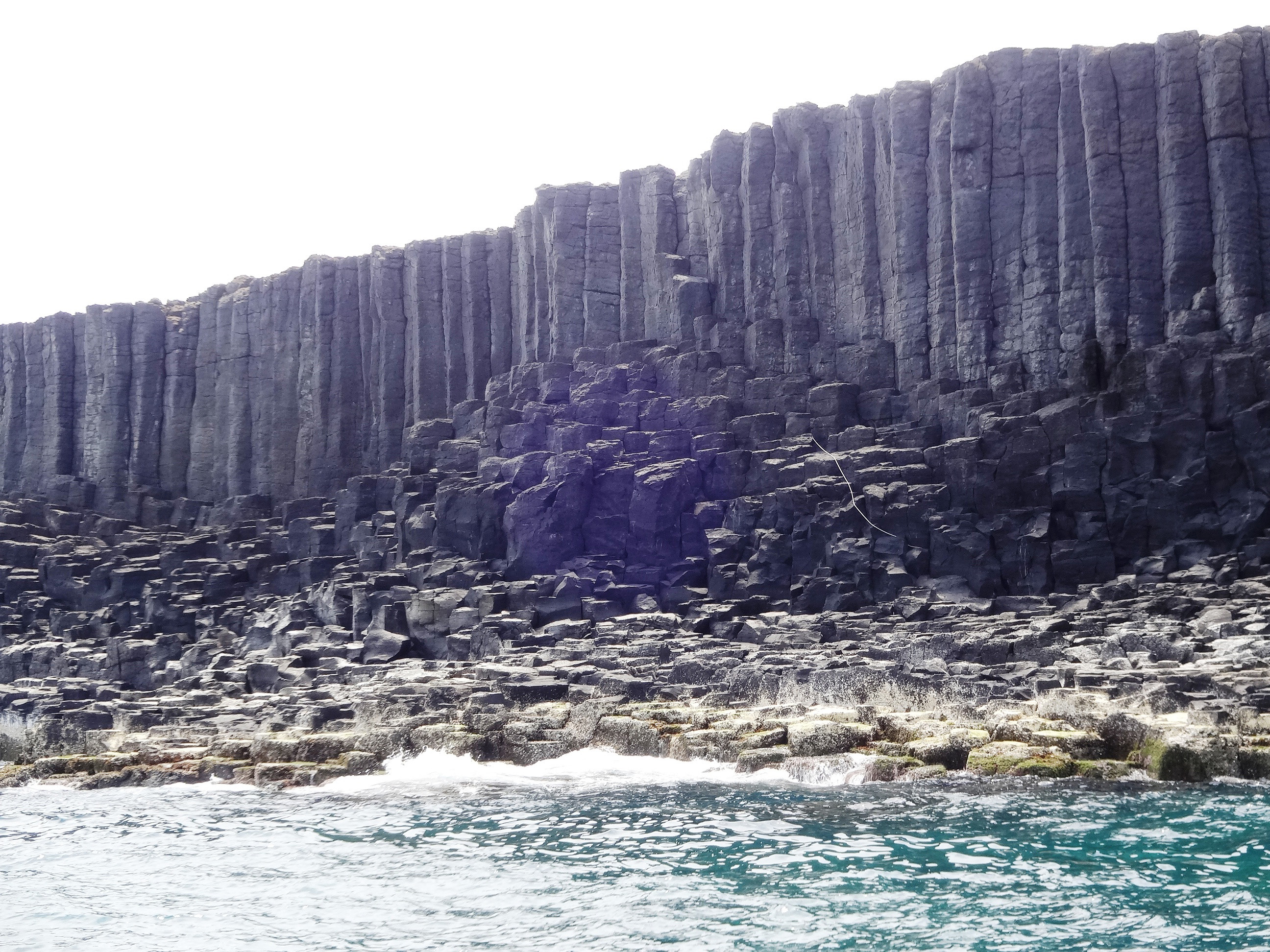
Columnar basalt at South Penghu Marine National Park

Penghu is the remnant of a Miocene-age shield volcano. The stratigraphy of the island is dominated by two to four layers of basalt interbedded with sandstone and mudstone deposited in shallow marine conditions.

== Demographics ==
=== Ethnicities ===
The majority of the populace (72%+) in Penghu are descendants of settlers from Tong'an in Fujian.

=== Population ===
Historical population
Year	Pop.	±%
1946	73,343	—
1950	77,993	+6.3%
1955	84,502	+8.3%
1960	96,986	+14.8%
1965	110,036	+13.5%
1970	119,153	+8.3%
1975	114,700	−3.7%
1980	107,043	−6.7%
1985	102,282	−4.4%
1990	95,932	−6.2%
1995	90,937	−5.2%
2000	89,496	−1.6%
2005	92,489	+3.3%
2010	96,918	+4.8%
2015	102,304	+5.6%
2020	105,952	+3.6%
2025	106,716	+0.7%
Source: 1. 澎湖縣政府 1947; 2. 澎湖縣政府 1964; 3. 澎湖縣政府 1975; 4. 縣市人口按性別及五齡組(63). Ministry of the Interior (Taiwan).

View source data.

=== Language ===
In Penghu, the native language is Taiwanese Hokkien, with Tong'an dialect being the most prevalent speech.

== Government ==
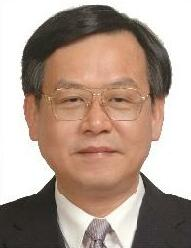
Lai Feng-wei, former Magistrate of Penghu County

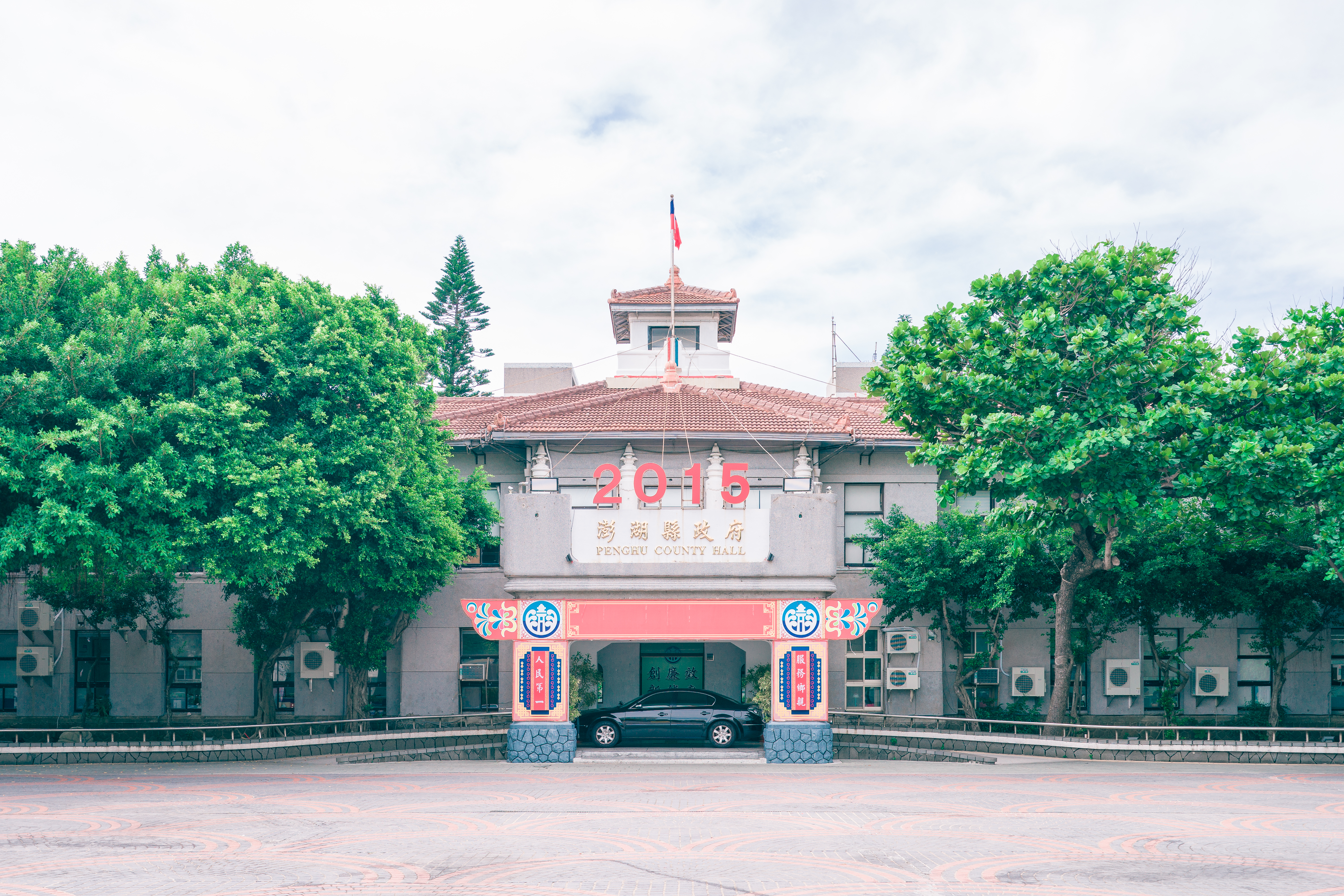
Penghu County Hall

Penghu County is administered by Penghu County Government headed by Magistrate Lai Feng-wei of the Kuomintang and headquartered at the Penghu County Hall.

=== Administrative divisions ===
Administrative subdivisions of Penghu County

Penghu County is divided into one city and five rural townships. It is further divided into 97 villages. Like Lienchiang County, Penghu County has no urban townships. The county seat is at Magong City, where it houses the Penghu County Hall and Penghu County Council.

Type	Name	Chinese	Taiwanese	Hakka	English translation
City	Magong City	馬公市	Má-keng	Mâ-kûng	Originally Mazu Temple (媽宮)
Rural townships	Baisha	白沙鄉	Pe̍h-soa	Pha̍k-sâ	White Sand
Rural townships	Cimei (Qimei)	七美鄉	Chhit-bí	Tshit-mî	Seven Beauties (大嶼)
Rural townships	Huxi	湖西鄉	Ô͘-sai	Fù-sî	Lake West
Rural townships	Wangan (Wang-an, Wang'an)	望安鄉	Bāng-oaⁿ	Mong-ôn	Hope Safe (網垵)
Rural townships	Xiyu	西嶼鄉	Sai-sū	Sî-yí	Western Isle

The main island (comprising Magong City and Huxi Township), Baisha Island and Xiyu are the three most populous islands and are connected via bridges. The Penghu Great Bridge connecting Baisha and Xiyu is the longest bridge in Taiwan. Two shorter bridges connect Huxi and Baisha via the small island of Zhongtun.

=== Politics ===
The county elects a single representative to the Legislative Yuan. In the 2016 Republic of China legislative election, this seat was won by the Democratic Progressive Party with 55.4% of the vote.

== Political dispute ==
Despite the controversy over the political status of Taiwan, both the Republic of China and the People's Republic of China agree that Penghu is a county in (their own respective) "Taiwan Province" (Taiwan Province, Republic of China and Taiwan Province, People's Republic of China). Yet, geographically, the island of Taiwan does not include Penghu, although it is closer to Taiwan than mainland China. Thus, Penghu is listed separately from "Taiwan" in some contexts, e.g. the Separate Customs Territory of Taiwan, Penghu, Kinmen, and Matsu (the official WTO name for the Republic of China) and in the Treaty of Shimonoseki, the Cairo Declaration, and the Treaty of San Francisco.

== Economy ==
Due to its restricted geography, fishing has been the main industry for Penghu. The Agriculture and Fisheries Bureau of the Penghu County Government governs matters related to agriculture and fisheries in Penghu.

In 2016, the bureau placed a ban on the harvesting of sea urchins due to their declining population. The ban was partially lifted in 2017, with catches limited to only specimens larger than 8 cm (3.1 in) in diameter.

== Education ==
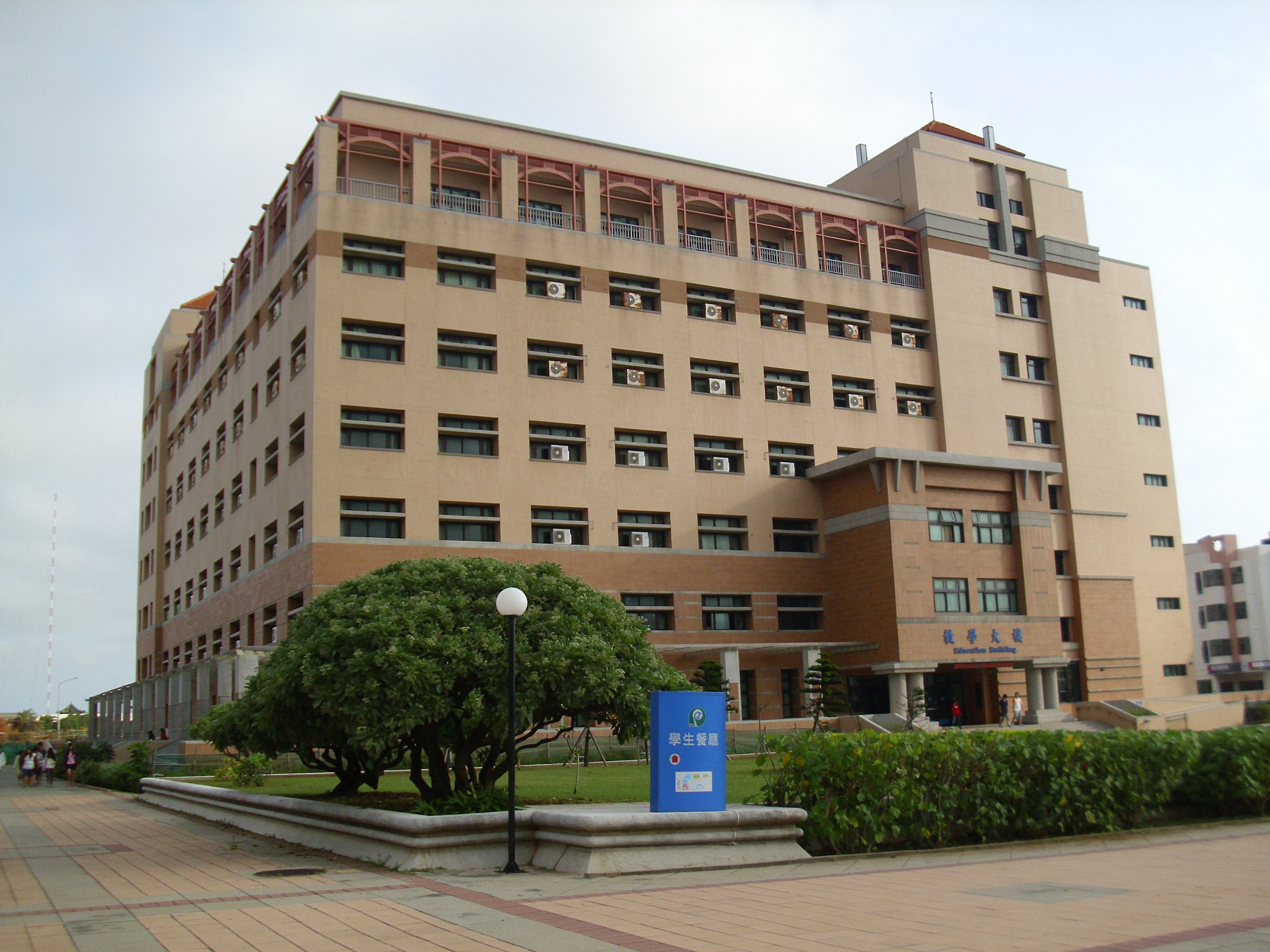
National Penghu University of Science and Technology

Education-related matters in Penghu County are administered under the Education Department of the Penghu County Government. The county houses the National Penghu University of Science and Technology.

== Energy ==
Penghu is powered by the Chienshan Power Plant, a 140 MW diesel-fired power plant commissioned in 2001, and the Hujing Power Plant on Table Island. On 24 December 2010, the Taiwan-Penghu Undersea Cable Project of Taipower was approved by the Executive Yuan to connect the electrical grid in Taiwan Island to Penghu.

Under a wind power development project approved in 2002 by the Executive Yuan, the ROC government plans to set up a total of 200 wind turbines in Penghu within 10 years. However, only 14 turbines have been set up as of 2015. On 1 October 2015, Taipower announced the construction of another 11 new wind turbines across the island, of which six will be constructed in Huxi Township and five in Baisha Township.

The current total desalination capacity of the county to provide clean water to its residents is 15,500 m^{3} per day. To reduce its groundwater use, in November 2015 the county secured a contract of building an additional desalination plant with 4,000 m^{3} capacity per day, construction of which is expected to be completed by May 2018.

== Tourism ==
The Penghu National Scenic Area was established in the early 1990s, comprising most of the islands and islets of the archipelago. Tourism has since become one of the main sources of income of the county.

Historical sites include Central Street, Erdai Art Hall, Tianhou Temple, Four-eyed Well, Penghu Reclamation Hall, Qimei Lighthouse, Xiyu Eastern Fort, Jinguitou Fortress and Xiyu Western Fort. Museums in the county are Chuwan Crab Museum, Ocean Resources Museum, Chang Yu-sheng Memorial Museum and Penghu Living Museum. Other attractions in the county include the Double-Heart of Stacked Stones, Fenggui Cave, Little Taiwan, Whale Cave, Xiaomen Geology Gallery and South Penghu Marine National Park.

Since 1 January 2015, tourists from Mainland China can directly apply for the Exit & Entry Permit upon arrival in Penghu. This privilege also applies to Kinmen and the Matsu Islands as a means to boost tourism in the outlying islands of Taiwan.

The county welcomed 1.8 million tourists in 2018 with an average annual growth of around 10%.

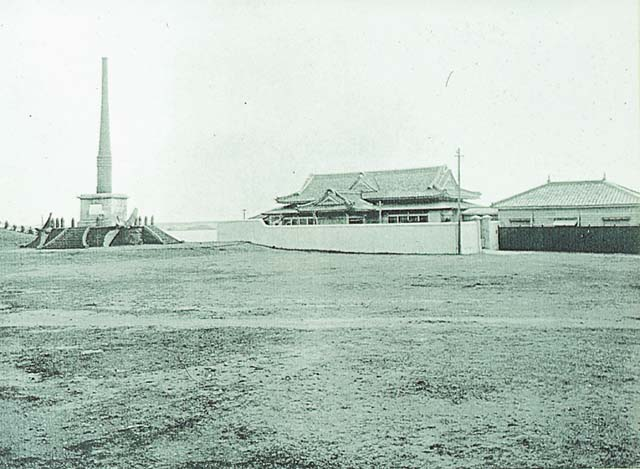
Original 1908 memorial to the Japanese cruiser Matsushima pictured. Modern park memorial in Magong City, Penghu, Taiwan.

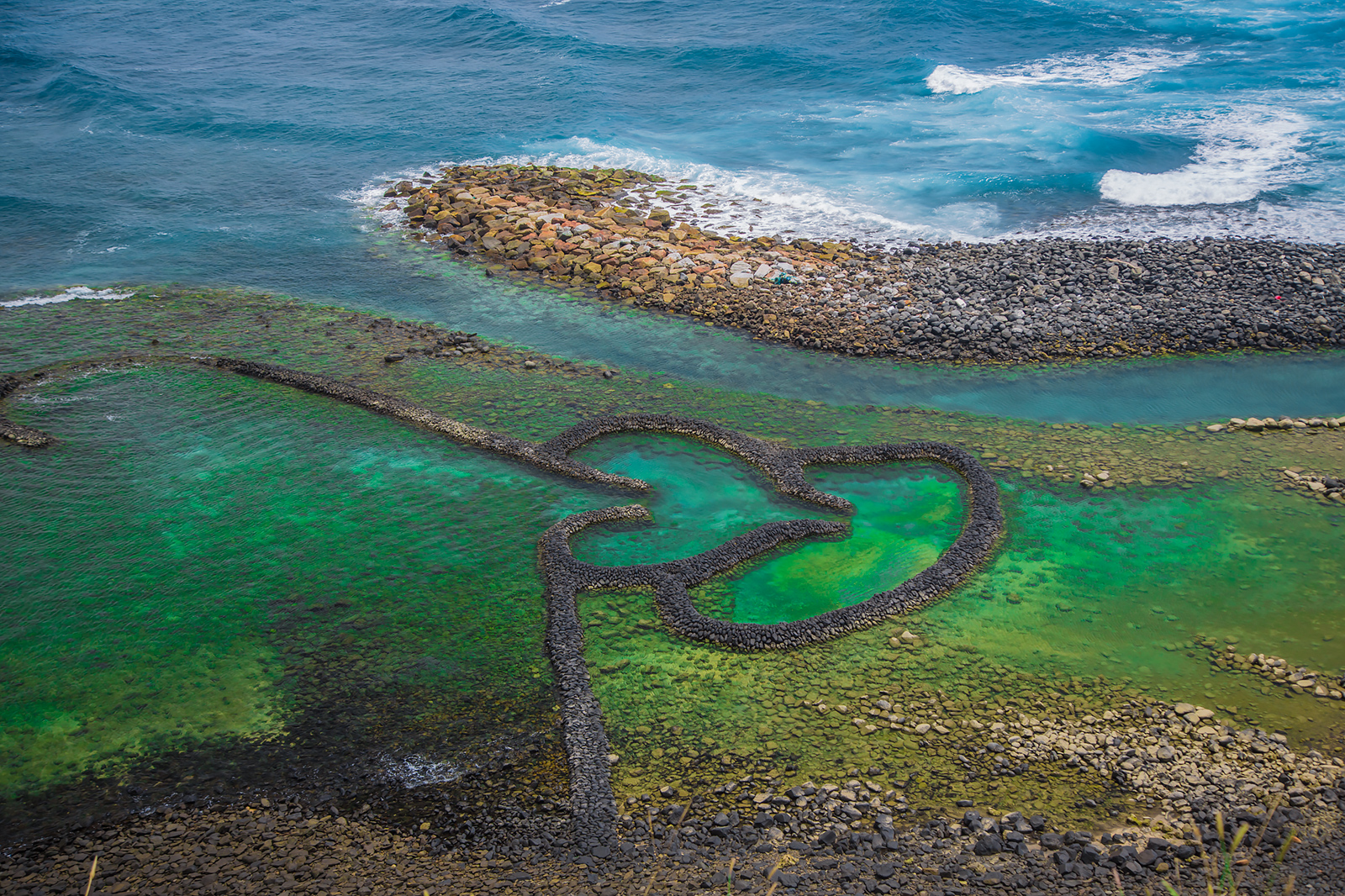
Double-Heart of Stacked Stones

== Drug trafficking ==
As a lightly populated outlying island, Penghu lends itself to being used as a trans-shipment hub for drug smuggling into Taiwan from China and the Philippines. Beginning in 2016, the area became the focus of a major drug trafficking crackdown by the Taiwanese police.

In 2016, Chou Meng-hsiang (周盟翔), chief prosecutor of the Penghu District Prosecutors Office, "led an investigation team in Taiwan, including officers from the Coast Guard Administration, in a bid to bring (a) drug trafficking ring to justice." A joint investigation with Philippine and Chinese authorities spanning one and a half years resulted in the seizure of "22.6 kilograms of amphetamine, 11.4 kilograms of ephedrine, and about 40 kilograms of calcium chloride" with an estimated value of NT$123 million. Eight suspects were arrested in Cagayan, a small island in northern Philippines, but no Taiwanese nationals were charged in relation to the importation scheme.

In 2017, media reported "the biggest-ever haul of drugs in the county's history" when 506 kg of ephedrine was seized from a Chinese fishing boat off Penghu "as part of an ongoing crackdown on the area drug trade". Ephedrine smuggling has increased in recent years as it has a similar structure to amphetamines and can be easily converted into methamphetamine. According to a Focus Taiwan report, "(It) can then be sold for ten times the price, in this case that would be more than NT$1 billion (US$33.33 million)."

Despite the size of the drug seizure, only the five crew members of the Chinese fishing boat were detained in the operation, with authorities "unable to find the Taiwanese ship which should have turned up to take delivery of the drugs". It was unclear from media reports how the Taiwanese side of the smuggling operation knew to abort the rendezvous. The suppliers of the shipment also evaded capture. It was believed that the drugs were destined to be transported from Penghu for distribution on Taiwan.

== Transport ==
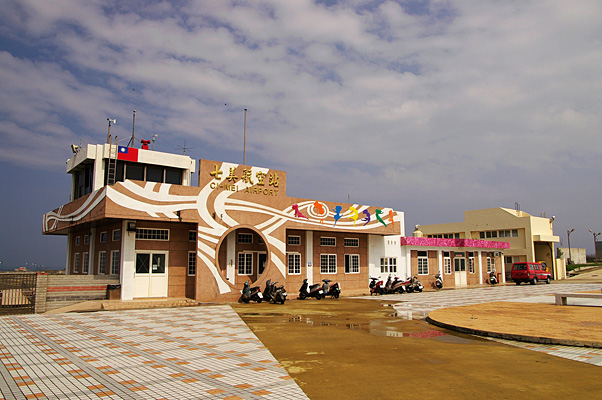
Qimei Airport

=== Air ===
Penghu is served by Penghu Airport in Magong City and Qimei Airport in Cimei Township. Both airports opened in 1977. Daily Air operates flights between Penghu to Kaohsiung.

=== Water ===
The county has Magong Harbor and Longmen Jianshan Pier. Magong Harbor hosts ferry connections with Kaohsiung, Tainan, Chiayi and Kinmen.

== See also ==
- Administrative divisions of Taiwan
- List of cities in Taiwan
- Political status of Taiwan
