= Magong Second Fishing Port =

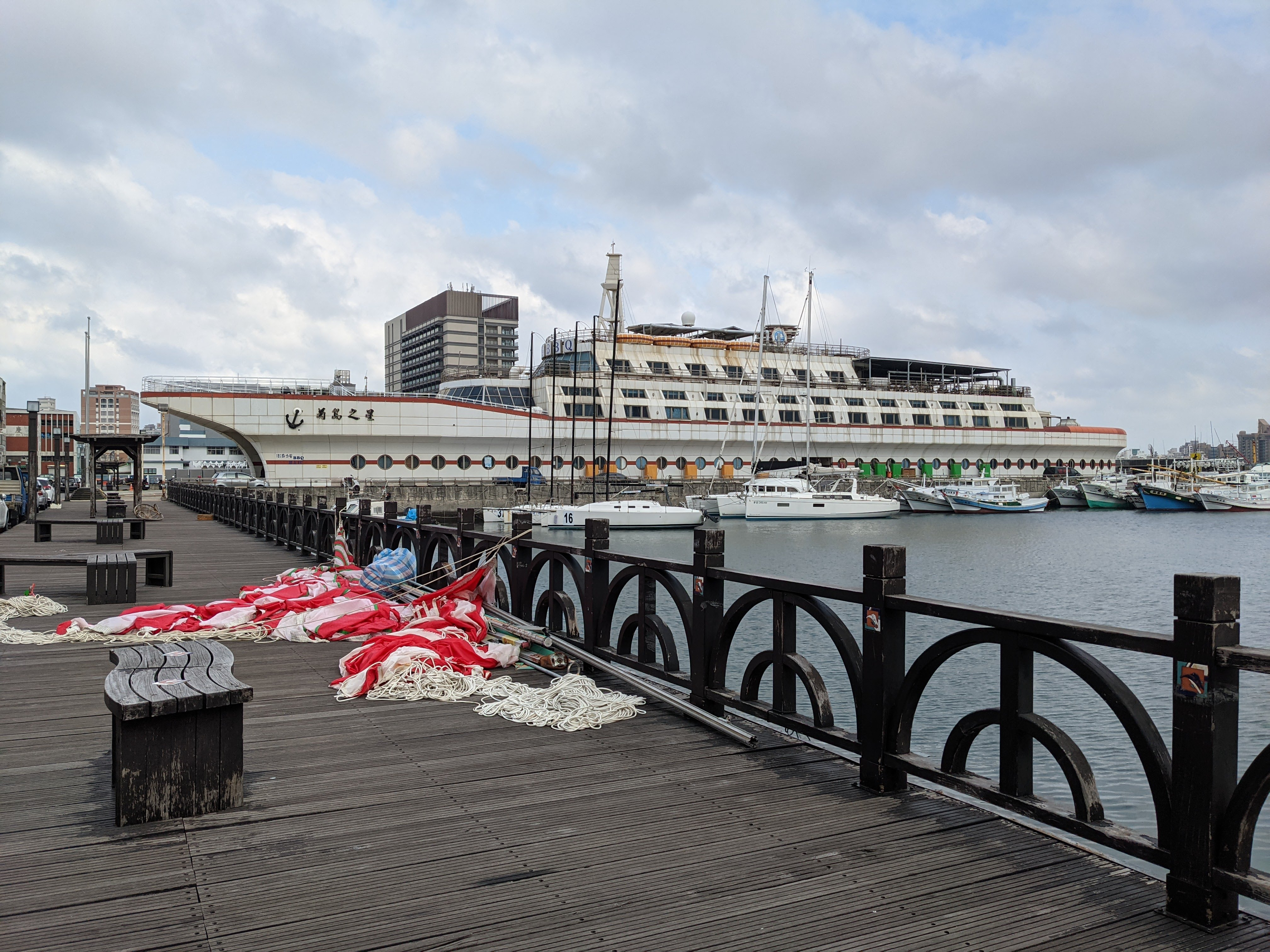
- Interactive map of Magong Second Fishing Port
- Native name: 馬公第二漁港

Location
- Country: Taiwan
- Location: Chungching and Guangfu Villages of Magong City, Penghu County, Taiwan
- Coordinates: 23°33′55″N 119°34′14″E

Details
- Opened: 1961 (ROC 50)
- Owned by: Penghu County Government

The Magong Second Fishing Port (Chinese: 馬公第二漁港; pinyin: Mǎ-gōng dì-Èr yú-gǎng; Wade–Giles: MA^{3} KUNG^{2} TI^{4} ER^{2} YU^{2} KANG^{3}; Pe̍h-ōe-jī: Má-king Tuē-jī Hû-káng) is located in Chungching and Guanghu Villages of Magong City, Penghu County, Taiwan. This port is administered by the Penghu County Government. Located on the eastern side of Magong Peninsula on Penghu Main Island, with the Magong First Fishing Port to the southwest and the Magong Third Fishing Port to the north, the harbor features breakwaters in an E shape.

== Background ==
Magong Fishing Port, located in the urban area of Magong City, Penghu County, was originally situated where today’s Magong Commercial Harbor stands. The first fishing port of Magong was completed in 1940, during the period of Japanese rule. At that time, the Hōko Prefecture (Japanese: 澎湖庁; Penghu Prefecture), in order to construct a new fishing port, dismantled the walls of Magong Wall and reclaimed land over the original coastal cliff area, historically known as “Hái-bé" (海尾) in Taiwanese, literally meaning “the edge of sea.” This reclaimed area was named Tsukiji-chō (Japanese: 築地町, means “Reclaimed Land District”.), with its southern section becoming the site of what is now the Magong First Fishing Port.

In 1945, Penghu was drawn into World War II and suffered heavy damage from Allied air raids, severely impacting Magong First Fishing Port. After the war, the Republic of China took over Taiwan and Penghu, formerly under Japanese colonial rule, but lacked the financial resources to repair the fishing port, leaving its functions stalled until gradual restoration began around 1955.

== Introduction ==
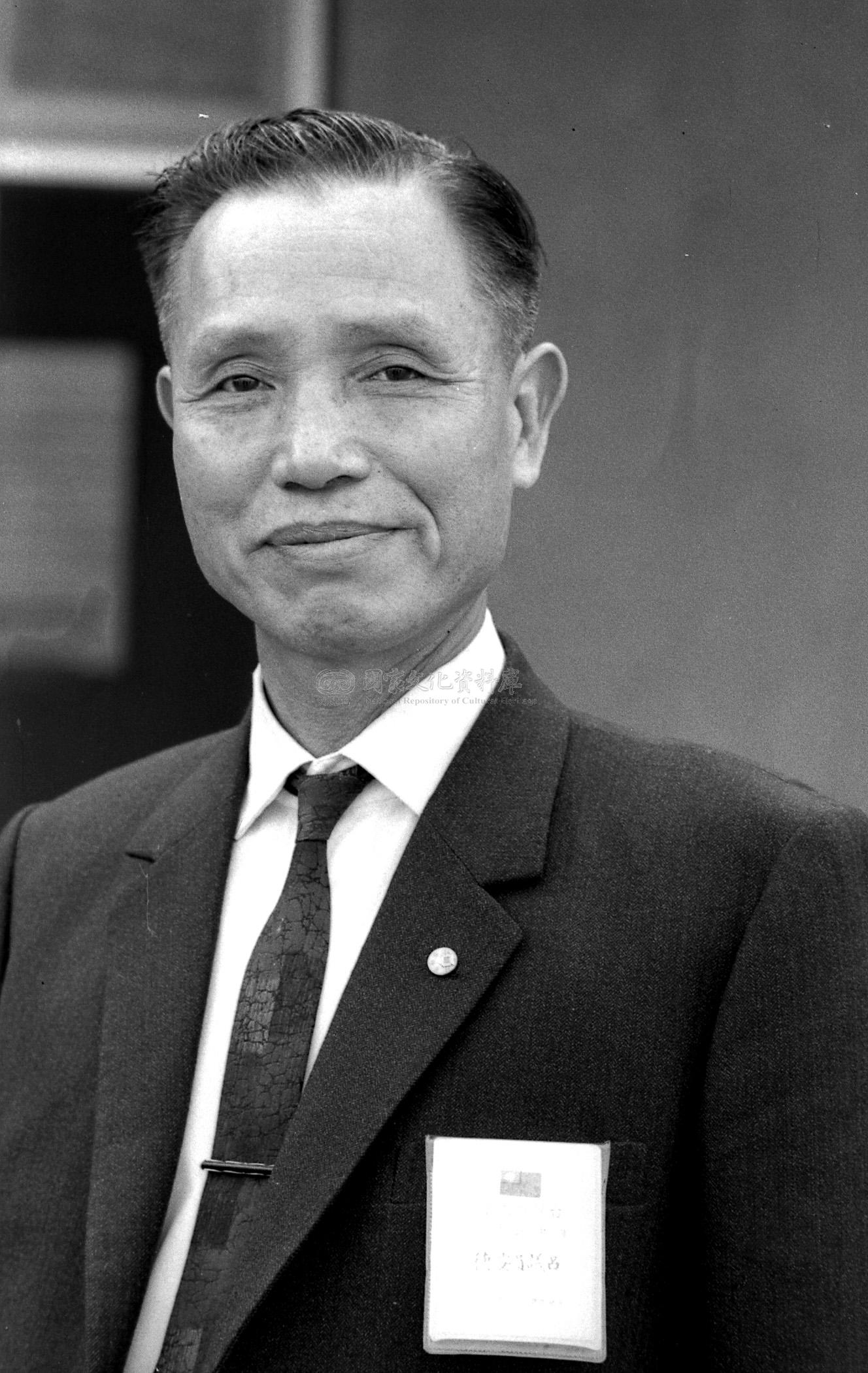
Portrait of Lū An-tik (呂安德), taken in 1968.

Later, to boost fishery production, the ROC government constructed another fishing port in the late 1950s on the northern side of the breakwater of Magong First Fishing Port, divided by what is today Xinggang South Street (興港南街). This new facility was named Magong Second Fishing Port.

The project was overseen by Lū An-tik (呂安德), then an official of the Penghu County Government (serving from 1950 to 1965). A native of Penghu, Lū An-tik studied architecture in Nihon University. He entered politics in 1968 and was elected as the seventh Penghu County Magistrate in 1972. Lū An-tik was the first Penghu-born county magistrate since the Republic of China took control of Taiwan and Penghu.

In 1961, the Magong Second Fishing Harbor was completed. Its hinterland was located in the Chungching (重慶里) and Guangfu (光復里) neighborhoods of Magong City, with a water depth of about 3.5 meters and a total length of approximately 390 meters. The harbor area was slightly larger than that of the First Fishing Harbor, capable of accommodating 500 fishing vessels, and was situated closer to the Magong Inner Bay, where the waters were calmer.

The breakwater was designed in the shape of the letter “E,” allowing vessels to berth on as many as four sides, which shortened the time needed for unloading catches and brought positive benefits to the volume of fish landed during peak fishing seasons.

According to Penghu County Gazetteer – Finance Section, edited by Lai Hui-min (賴惠敏) in 2005, the total reconstruction and improvement costs for the two Magong fishing harbors between 1950 and 1981 amounted to NT$31 million.

Around the 1980s, Penghu’s fishery resources were in steady decline. Nevertheless, the Penghu County Government and the Taiwan Provincial Government decided in 1980 to launch the “Taiwan Fishing Harbor Construction Program,” which included the expansion project for Magong Third Fishing Harbor in the Penghu region.

Starting in 1980, the construction of Magong Third Fishing Harbor was carried out in four phases and concluded in 2002. From that point onward, the main fishing harbor operations center in the Magong area was relocated to the Third Fishing Harbor.

== Transformation ==
Today, Magong Second Fishing Harbor has shifted from its original fishing port function to a tourism-oriented role. The Penghu County Government has installed wooden boardwalks and seating along the waterfront, providing visitors with spaces to stroll, relax, and enjoy the pier’s scenery, and has given the area the additional name “Fisherman’s Wharf (漁人碼頭).” In addition, the Penghu Fisher Association has built a shopping mall (菊島之星) within the harbor area, designed with an exterior in the shape of a large ship.

== Gallery ==
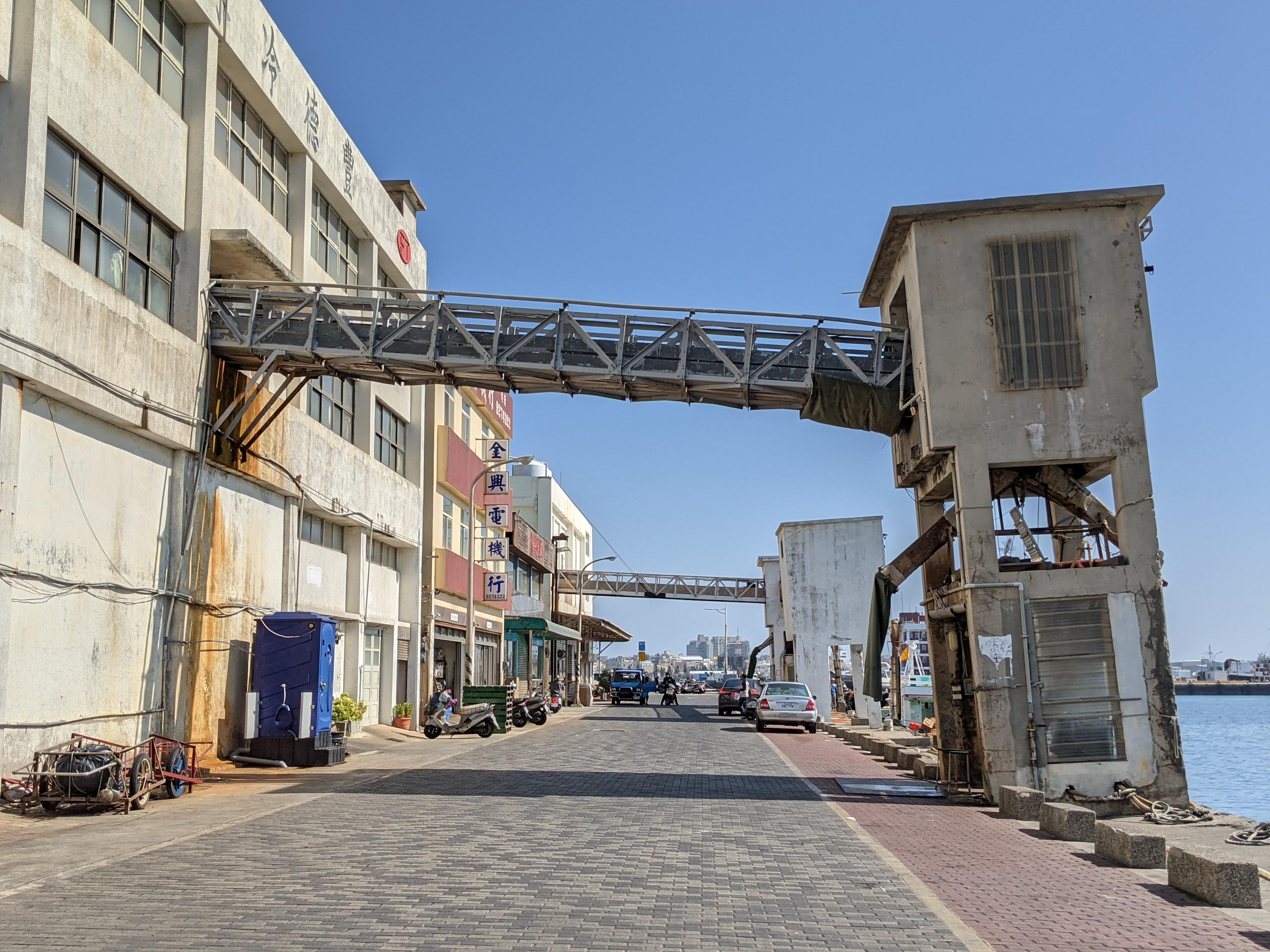
An ice making plant

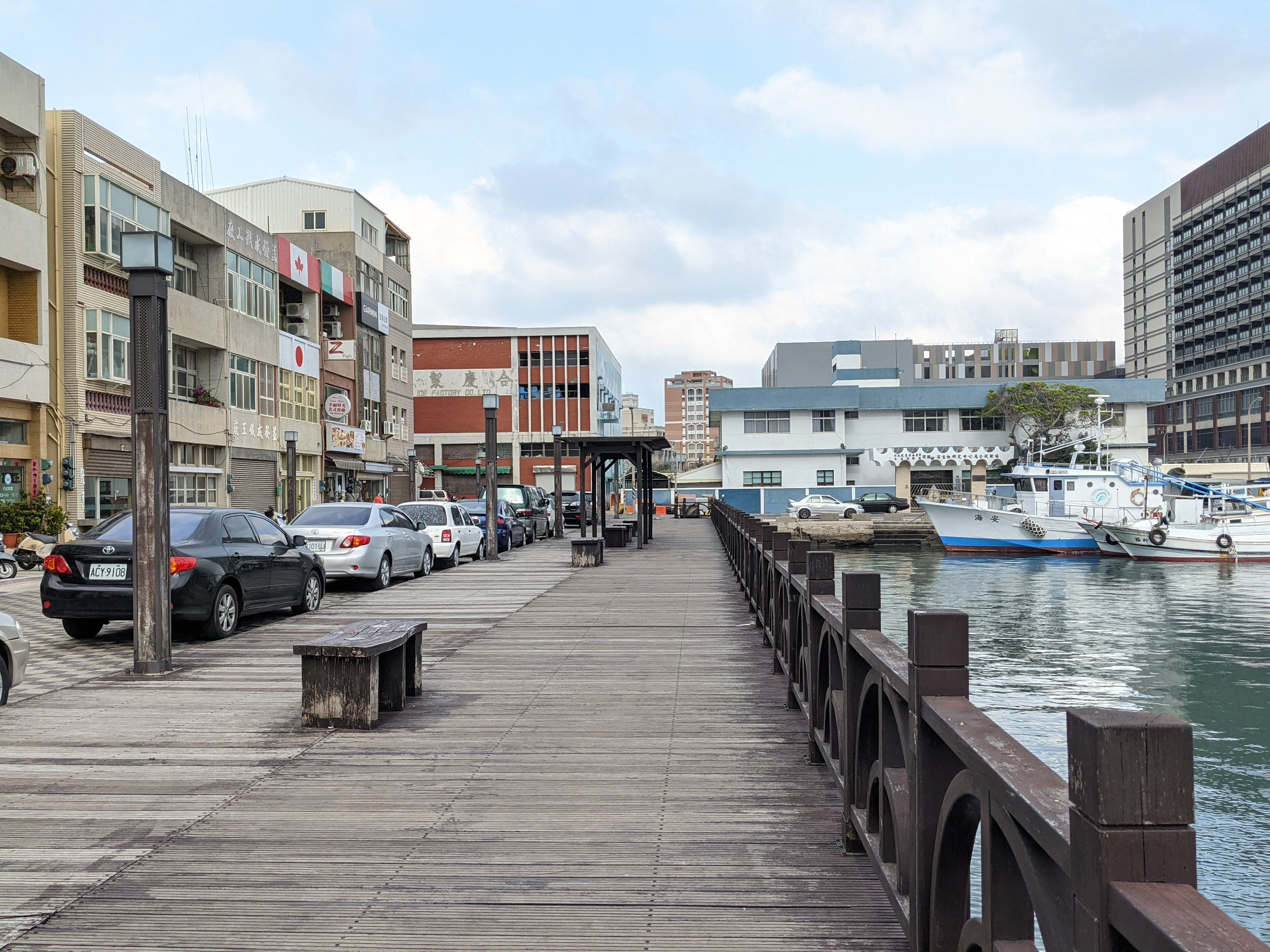
Harborfront Boardwalk

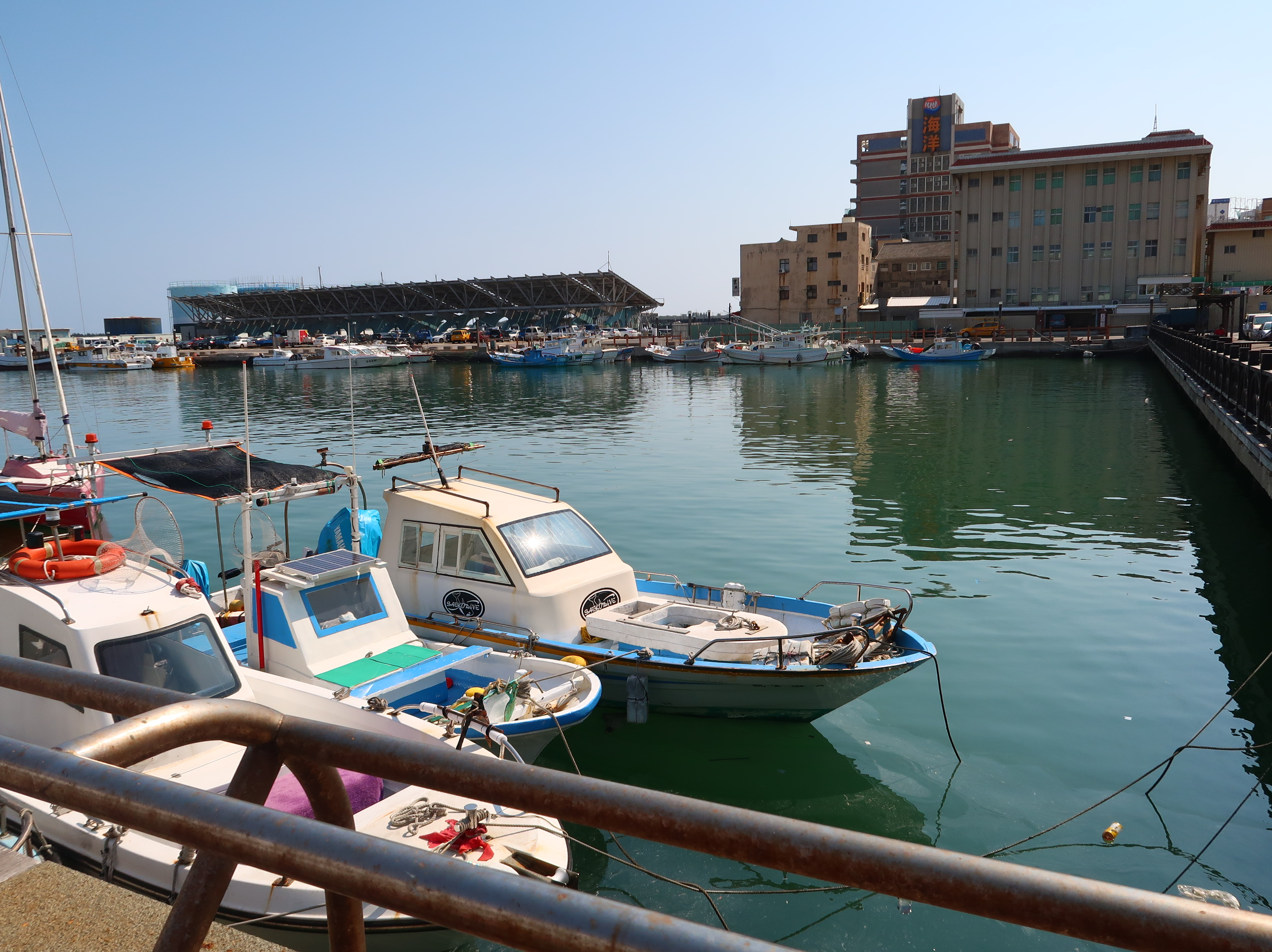
Ships in port

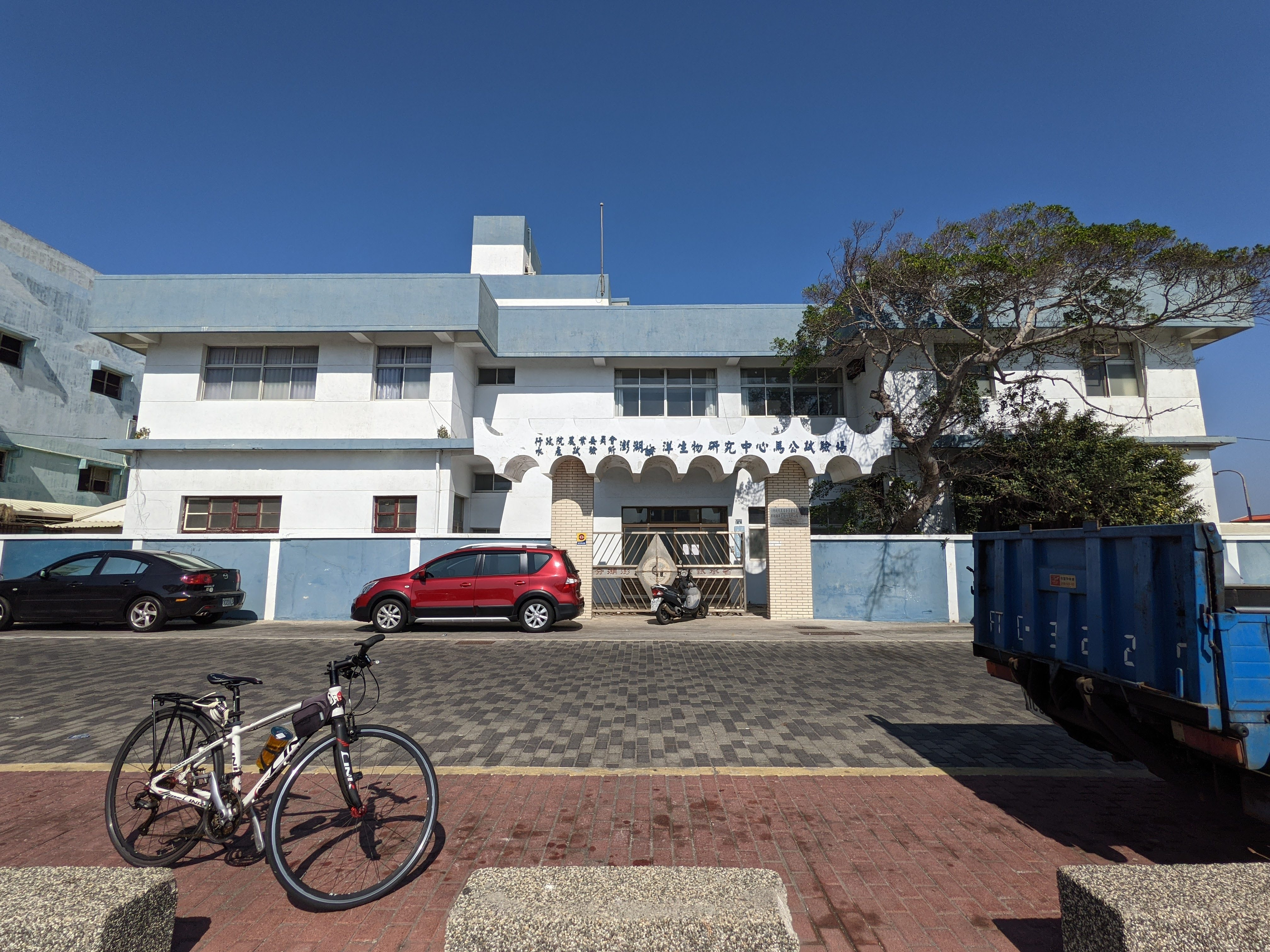
Penghu Marie Biology Research Center

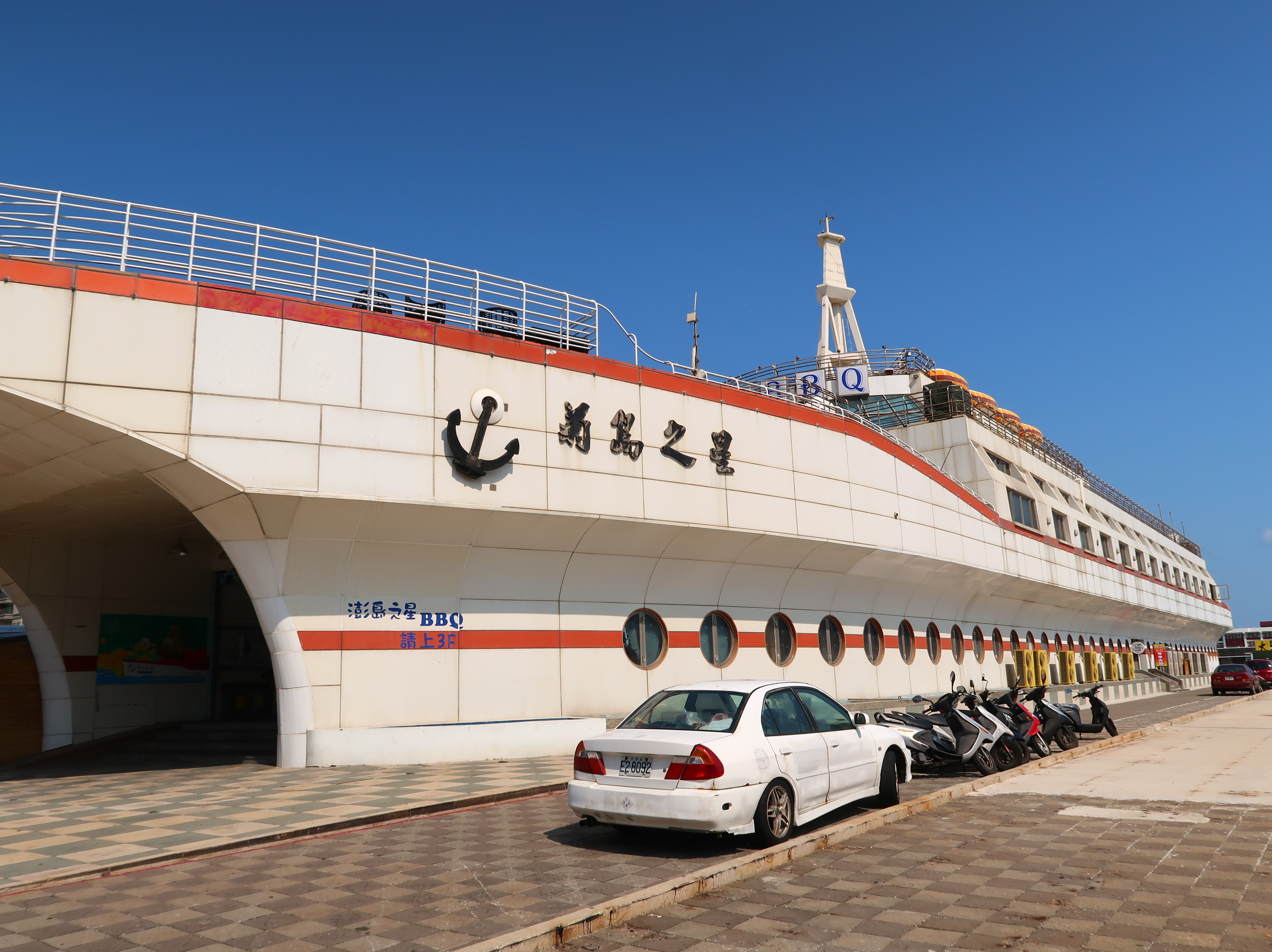
Penghu Fisher Association Ship Shopping Mall

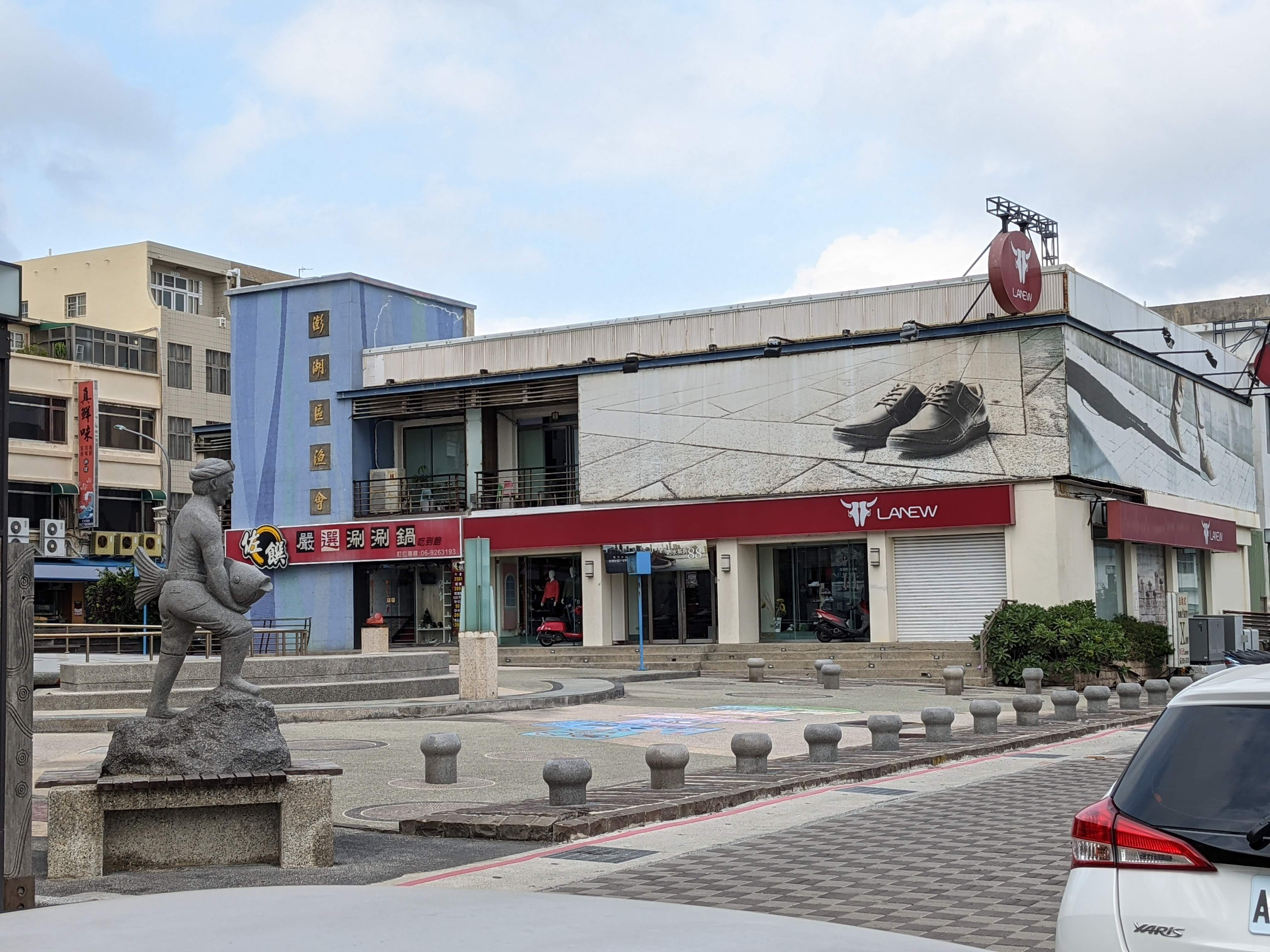
Credit Departments of Penghu Fisherman's Associations

== See also ==
- Penghu Fisher Association
- Magong First Fishing Port
- Magong Third Fishing Port
- Penghu Marie Biology Research Center
