= Magong First Fishing Port =

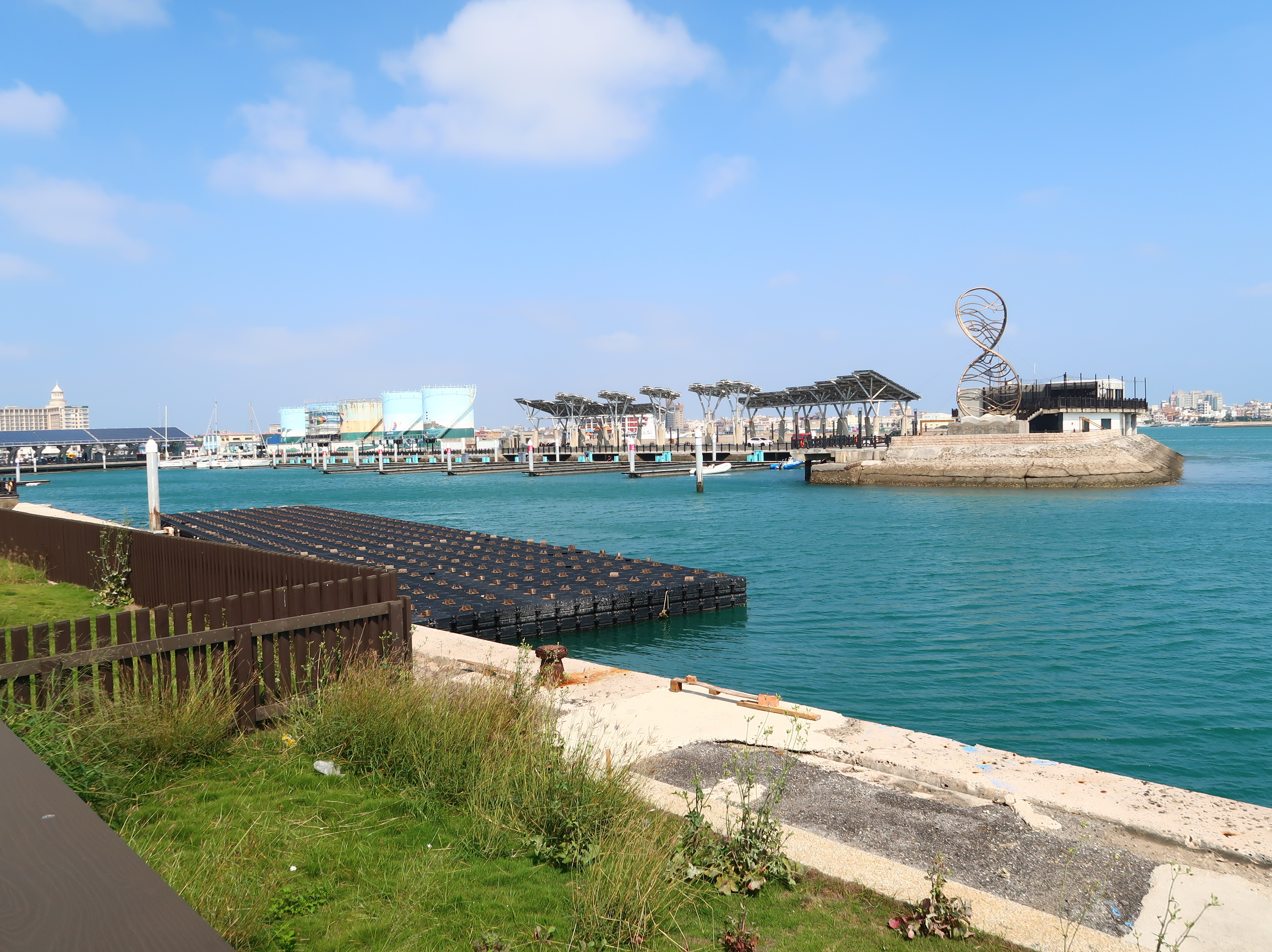
- Interactive map of Magong First Fishing Port
- Native name: 馬公第一漁港

Location
- Country: Taiwan
- Location: Chiming and Chungching Villages of Magong City, Penghu County, Taiwan
- Coordinates: 23°33′47″N 119°34′06″E

Details
- Opened: 1940 (Shōwa 15)
- Owned by: Penghu County Government

The Magong First Fishing Port (Chinese: 馬公第一漁港; pinyin: Mǎ-gōng dì-yī yú-gǎng; Wade–Giles: MA^{3} KUNG^{2} TI^{4} YI^{1} YU^{2} KANG^{3}; Pe̍h-ōe-jī: Má-king Tuē-it Hû-káng) is located in Chiming and Chungching Villages of Magong City, Penghu County (formerly Tsukiji-chō / 築地町), Taiwan. This port is administered by the Penghu County Government. It sits on the southern side of the Magong Peninsula on Penghu Main Island, bordered by Magong Commercial Harbor to the west and the Second Fishing Port to the east. Constructed in 1940, the First Fishing Port was transformed into a yacht marina in 2017.

== History ==
The name of Magong (馬公), historically known as Má-king (媽宮) in Taiwanese, is located in an inner bay of Penghu Island. Sheltered from seasonal monsoons by Xiyu, Baisha, and the Fenggui Peninsula, the harbor features deep and wide waters that remain calm year-round, making it ideal for docking vessels in all seasons. Since the Ming Empire, it has served as a station for both naval and fishing vessels. The name "Má-king" derives from a temple dedicated to Mazu, the Goddess of the Sea, situated at the port's entrance, now known as the Penghu Tianhou Temple.

=== Qing Empire ===
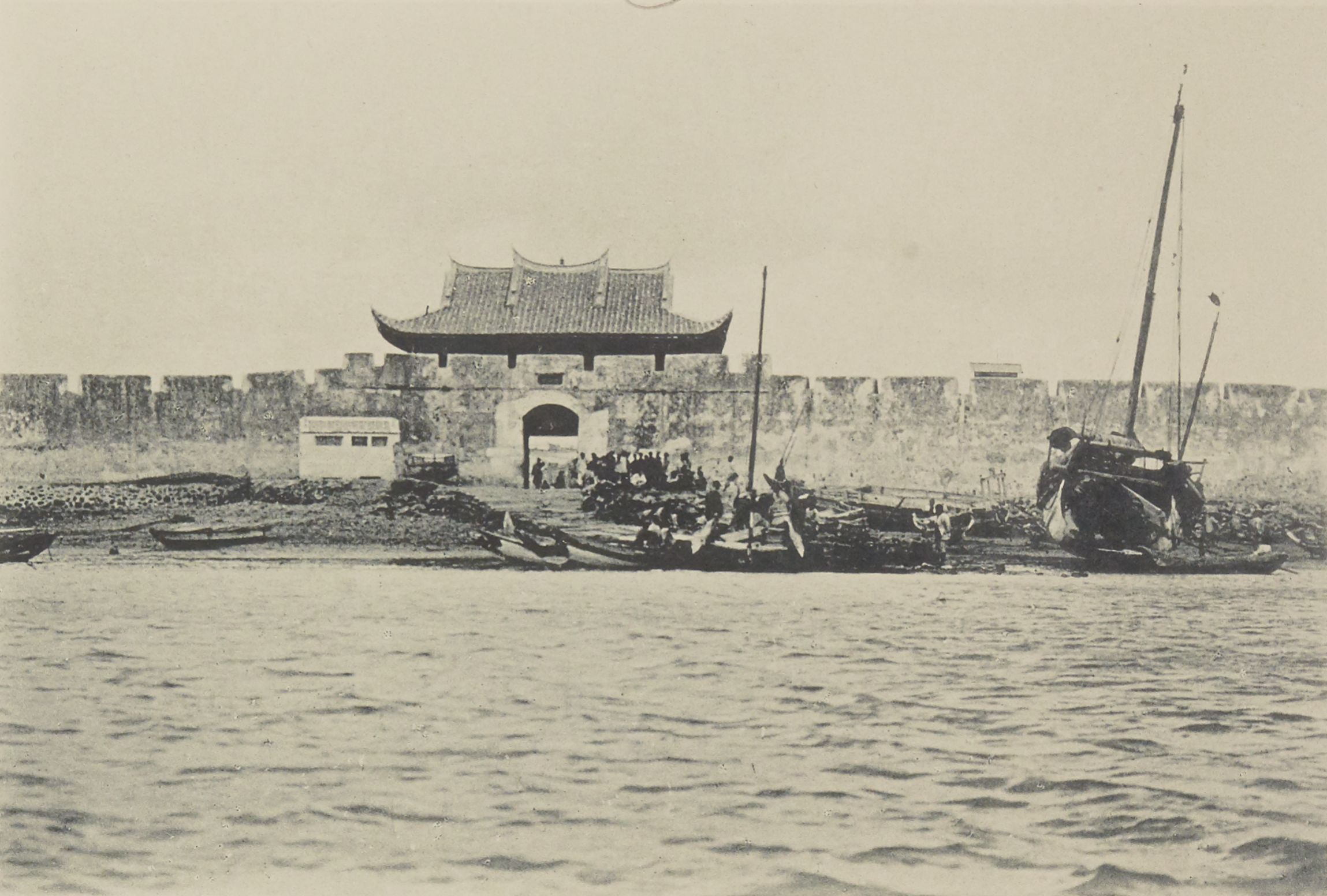
In the 1890s, the area of what is now Magong Commercial Harbor, including the old city wall, was known as "Hái-thâu", meaning "seaward edge" in Taiwanese.

During the Qing rule, most fishing activities in the Magong area were concentrated around the site of today's Magong Commercial Harbor. After the completion of Magong Wall in 1889, the harbor area was divided into an "official pier" and a "commercial pier" (known as the Shuixian Temple Port). Both were located in the Nanjiā area (南甲, South Jia) of Magong (historically called "Hái-thâu", literally meaning "seaward edge" in Taiwanese, corresponding to today's Fuxing Village in Magong City).

=== Empire of Japan ===
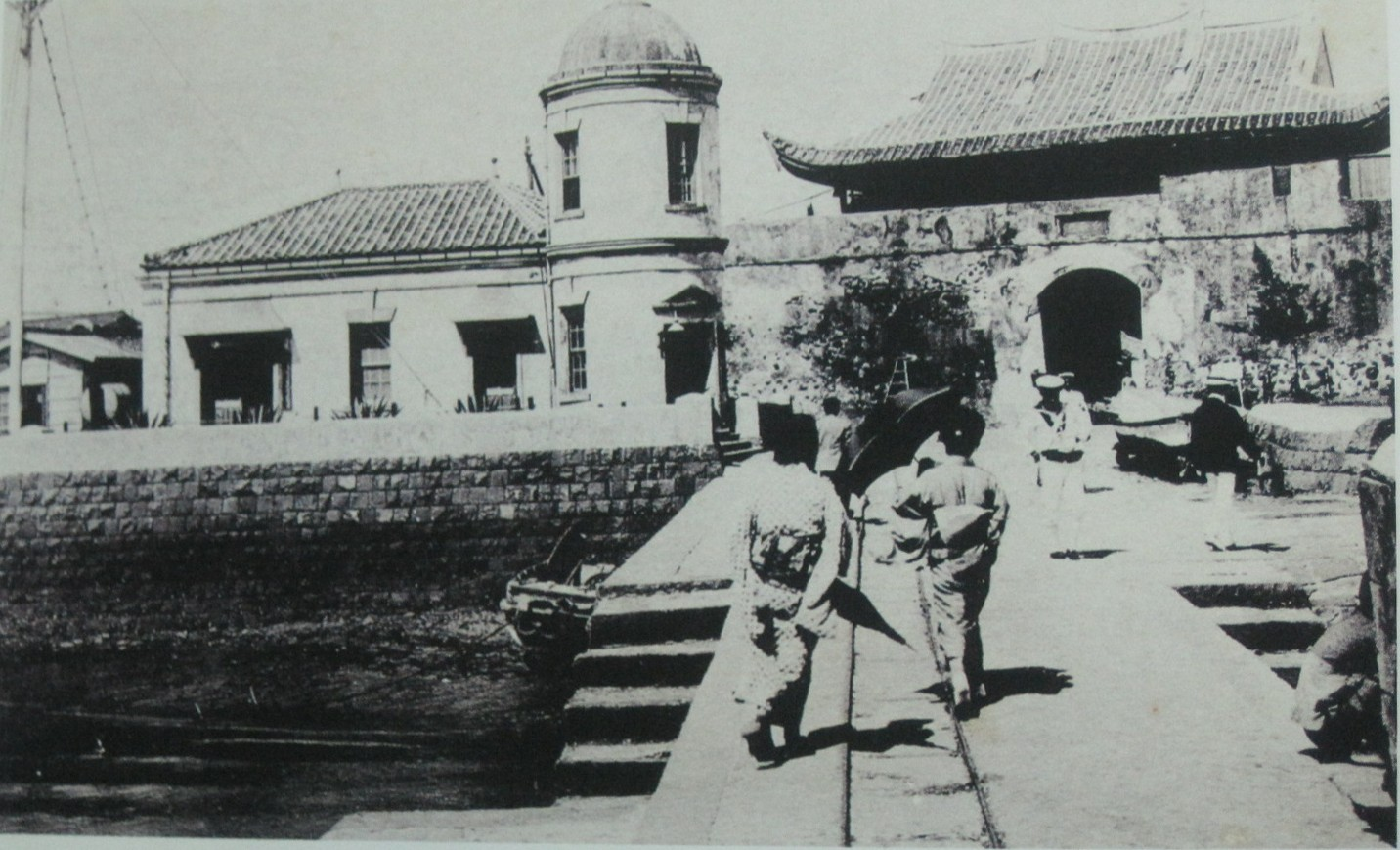
The Little South Gate of the Magong Wall along with the Water Police Station. This photo was taken in Nánjiǎ, part of today's Magong. Before 1940, including the Qing era. This port area was a mix of commercial and fishing use.

On 10 May 1895 (the 21st year of Guangxu in Qing chronology and the 28th year of Meiji in Japan), the Empire of Japan replaced the Qing Empire as the ruling authority and established the Government-General of Taiwan to administer Taiwan and the Penghu Islands. In December of the same year, the Governor-General's Office launched an island-wide industrial survey. According to the report, 70 to 80 percent of the population in Penghu's coastal villages engaged in fishing activities. However, their fishing techniques were underdeveloped, operations were limited to nearshore waters, and catches were only sufficient to supply the immediate area, with no capacity for large-scale production or distribution.

In 1903, the Hōko Prefecture (Japanese: 澎湖庁; Penghu Prefecture) reclaimed new land along the southern shore outside Magong City. In 1904, the newly reclaimed area east of the Second Pier was named Tsukiji-chō (築地町, means "Reclaimed Land District"). This later gave rise to the informal local name Tio̍k-káng (築港) for the area that would eventually become the First Fishing Port.

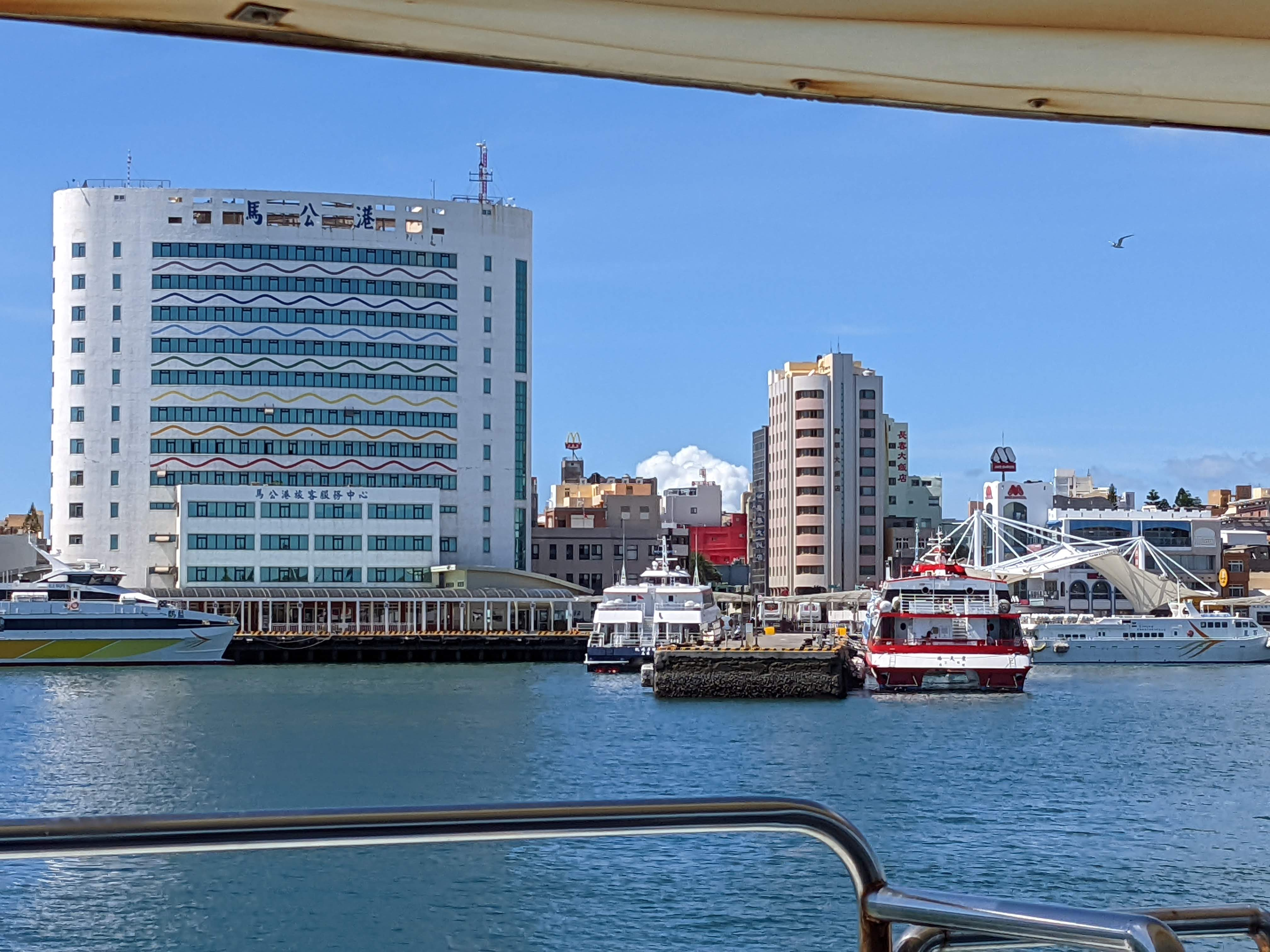
Photo of the Magong Commercial Harbor area taken from the sea, 2022.

In 1910, the Hōko Prefecture established the "Hōko Fisheries Association", which introduced powered fishing vessels and implemented subsidy programs for improved fishing gear. These activities were centered in the area of what is now Magong Commercial Harbor, where both fishing and commercial vessels still shared the port.

==== Planning ====
By the 1920s, Magong Harbor faced challenges such as insufficient water depth and difficulty accommodating larger ships. To address these issues, Hōko Prefecture commissioned engineers in 1924, 1929, and 1931 to conduct evaluations and surveys for constructing a new port. In 1935, a formal plan for the new Magong Port was drafted.

However, on 7 July 1937, the Marco Polo Bridge Incident in China triggered the Second Sino-Japanese War between the Empire of Japan and the Republic of China. In response, Japan issued a ban on trade between the Penghu port area and ports along the Chinese coast, converting the original Magong Harbor into a military port and prohibiting its use for fishing and commercial purposes. Consequently, Hōko Prefecture decided to proceed with its plan to construct a separate fishing harbor.

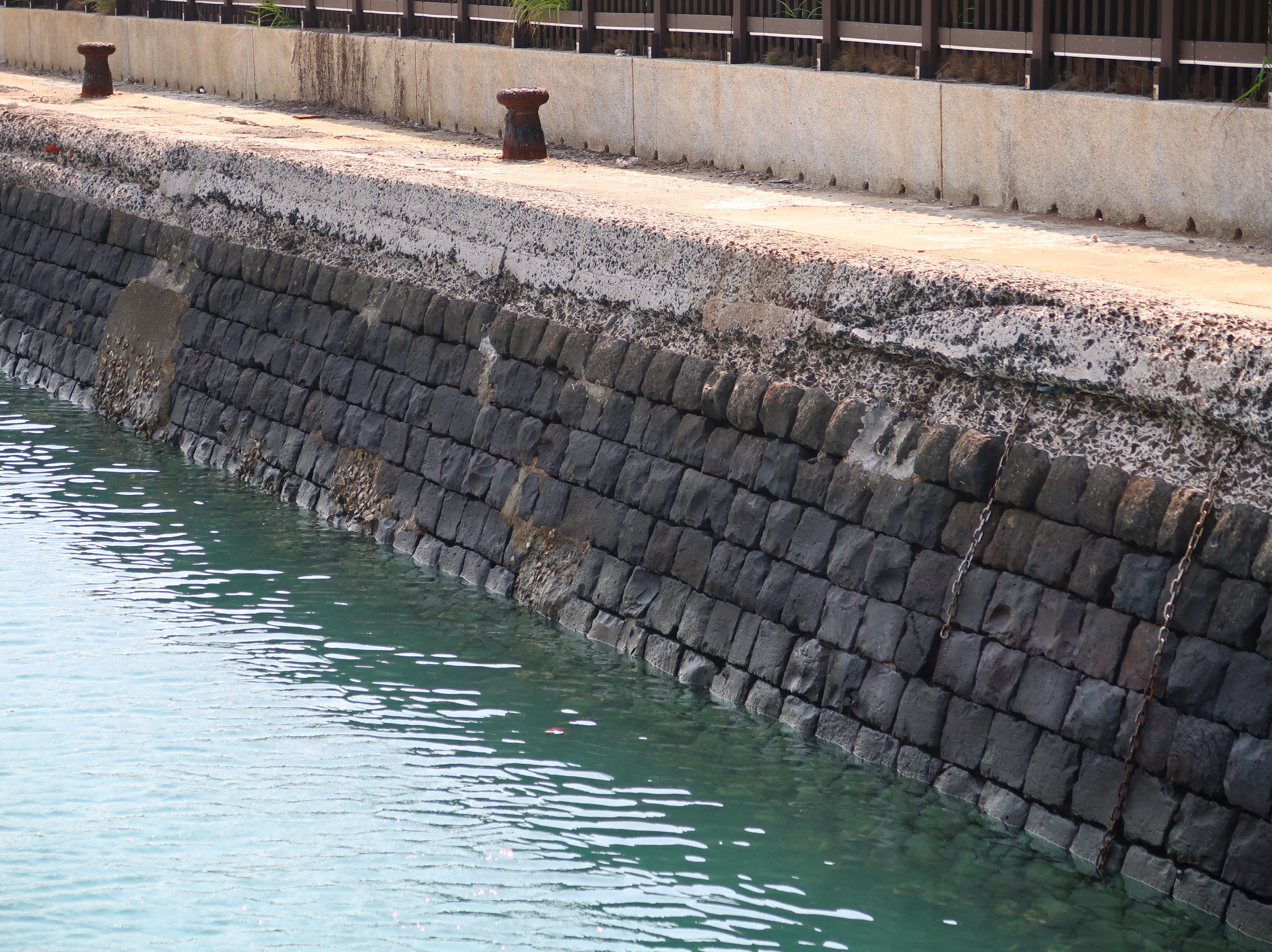
Showing how materials from the Magong Old Wall were repurposed.

==== Completion ====
In 1938, Hōko Prefecture selected a site north of the Third Pier of Magong Harbor (today the northeast side of Magong Commercial Harbor) to construct a new fishing port. Materials required for the project, such as earth and stone, were sourced from the dismantling of Magong Wall. The walls and gates from the East Gate to the North Gate were completely removed and repurposed for land reclamation, embankment construction, and quay walls. Two breakwaters were extended, creating berths for up to 60 fishing vessels. Onshore facilities included a modern ice plant, fuel storage tanks, a shipyard, and a fish market. The project cost a total of 8.53 million yen and took three years to complete, with the "Magong First Fishing Port" officially finished in April 1940.

However, not long after it began operation, Penghu was drawn into the Pacific War. In 1945, the islands were heavily affected by the conflict, and U.S. air raids caused severe damage to the Magong Harbor area, including the First Fishing Port.

=== After the war ===
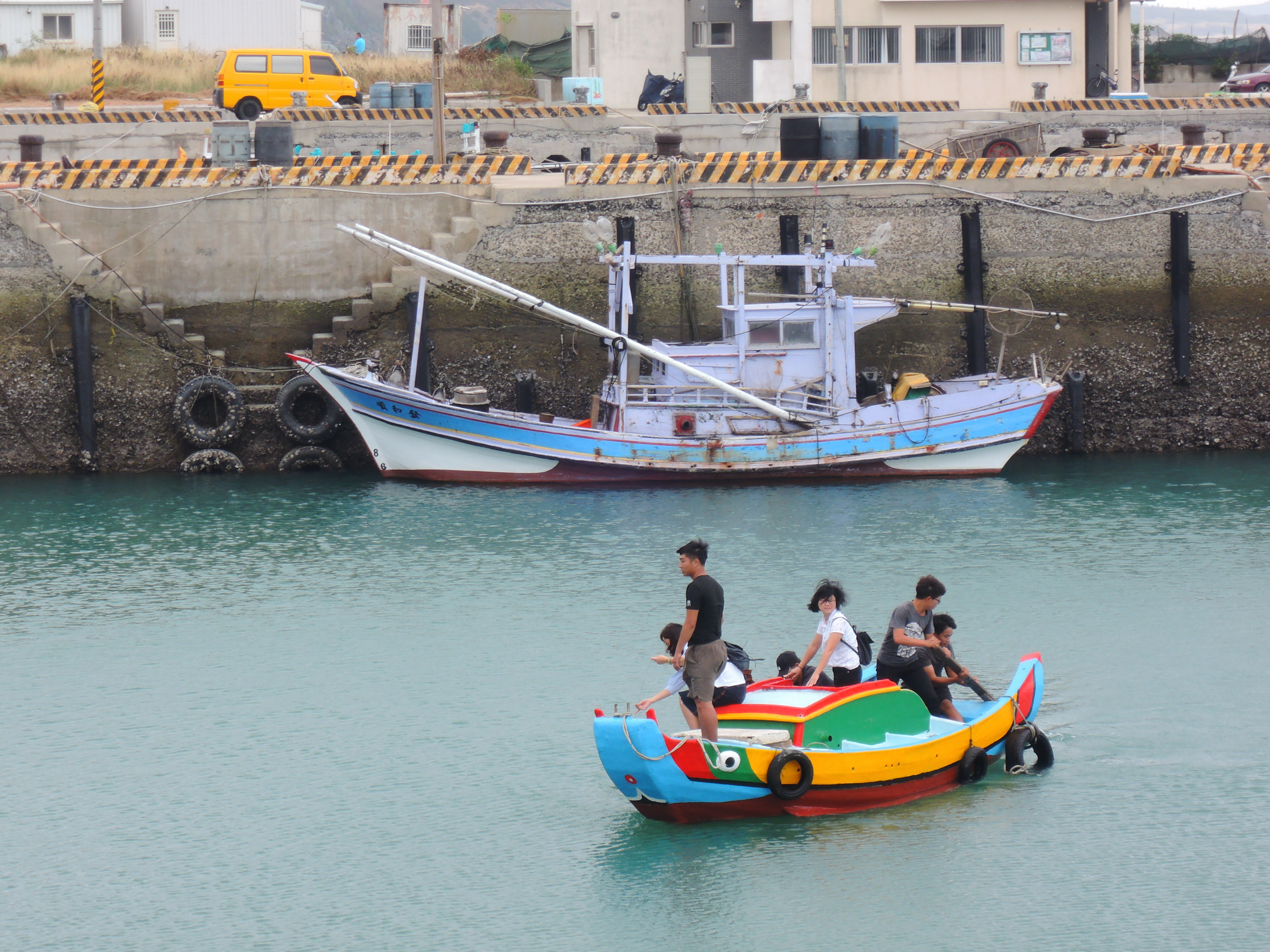
A type of small wooden sampan commonly seen in early Penghu was known locally as the "Tuā-ba̍k-tsûn" (大目船, literally "big-eye boat").

After the end of World War II in 1945, the city of Magong was left in ruins. Although the Republic of China took over Taiwan, the newly established government faced severe financial limitations. The reconstruction of Magong Harbor largely depended on material and supply assistance from the Catholic Church, while the actual rebuilding work was carried out through labor mobilized by local residents.

Within the Penghu Islands, only Magong Fishing Port and Jiangjun'ao Port provided shelter from storms, and Magong was one of the few locations with relatively complete onshore fishing facilities. At the time, Penghu County had only a dozen or so motorized fishing vessels; the rest were small sampans, resulting in a clear shortage in fishing capacity.

Following wartime air raid damage, the Magong harbor area remained inactive for some time. It was not until around 1955 that most of the port's functions were restored.

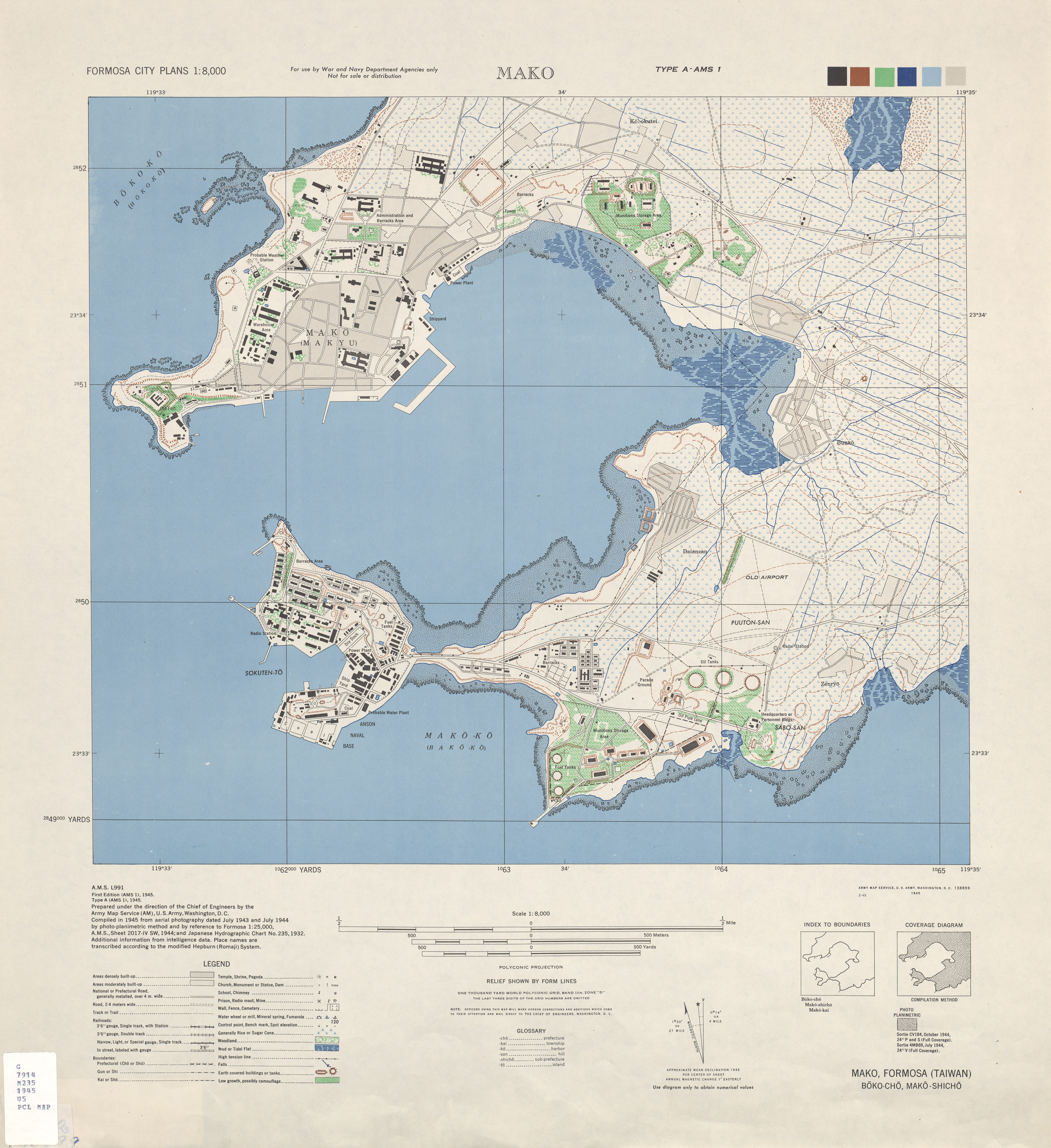
A 1945 image of Magong Commercial Port and the First Fishing Port, as charted by the U.S. military. At the time, the Second Fishing Port had not yet been constructed, and the Wen'ao and Anshan areas were still vast intertidal zones. After 1970, these intertidal areas disappeared, becoming reclaimed land for the construction of the Magong Third Fishing Port.

Later, in an effort to increase fishery production, the Nationalist Government of China gradually constructed fishing port facilities across Penghu. In 1959, a new facility, the "Magong Second Fishing Port", was built on the northern side of the breakwater of the Magong First Fishing Port. According to the Penghu County Gazetteer: Finance Volume (2005), edited by Lai Hui-min (賴惠敏), a total of NT$31 million was allocated for use at the Magong Fishing Ports between 1950 and 1981.

In the Magong City Gazetteer (1984), compiled by Tsai Ping-li (蔡平立), it is recorded that the Magong First Fishing Port covered a berthing area of approximately 24,300 square meters, with a north–south length of about 270 meters and a water depth of 9 meters, capable of accommodating over one hundred fishing vessels. In 1966, the Penghu Fisher Association built an ice-making plant between the First and Second Fishing Ports. The facility had a daily production capacity of 60 tons of ice and could freeze 6 tons and refrigerate up to 800 tons of seafood products.

From the 1950s to the 1980s, Penghu experienced a peak period of rapid growth in its fishing industry. However, due to the gradual depletion of coastal fishery resources, catch volumes began to noticeably decline in the 1980s. Despite this, government authorities proceeded with the "Magong Third Fishing Port Construction Project" in 1980. The first phase was completed in 1987, followed by three additional phases. The project concluded with the fourth phase in 2002, with a total cost of NT$1.5993 billion. The once vast intertidal zone of Wen'ao (文澳) in Magong City was entirely transformed into the hinterland of the Third Fishing Port. Since then, the center of fishing operations in the Magong area shifted from the original First and Second Fishing Ports to the newly constructed Magong Third Fishing Port.

==== Transformation ====
In response to the declining fishing functions of Magong First Fishing Port, the Penghu County Government initiated plans to transform the port into a marina for tourism and recreational purposes. On 25 May 2016, the county government signed the "Magong First Fishing Port Yacht Berthing Area Reconstruction and Operation Transfer Project," which was approved by the Fisheries Agency of the Council of Agriculture on 11 January 2017. The government then launched a public tender process. The port has since been converted into a yacht marina, now operated by Argo Yachts Development Co., Ltd., providing facilities such as shore water, shore power, and fuel supply.

== Gallery ==
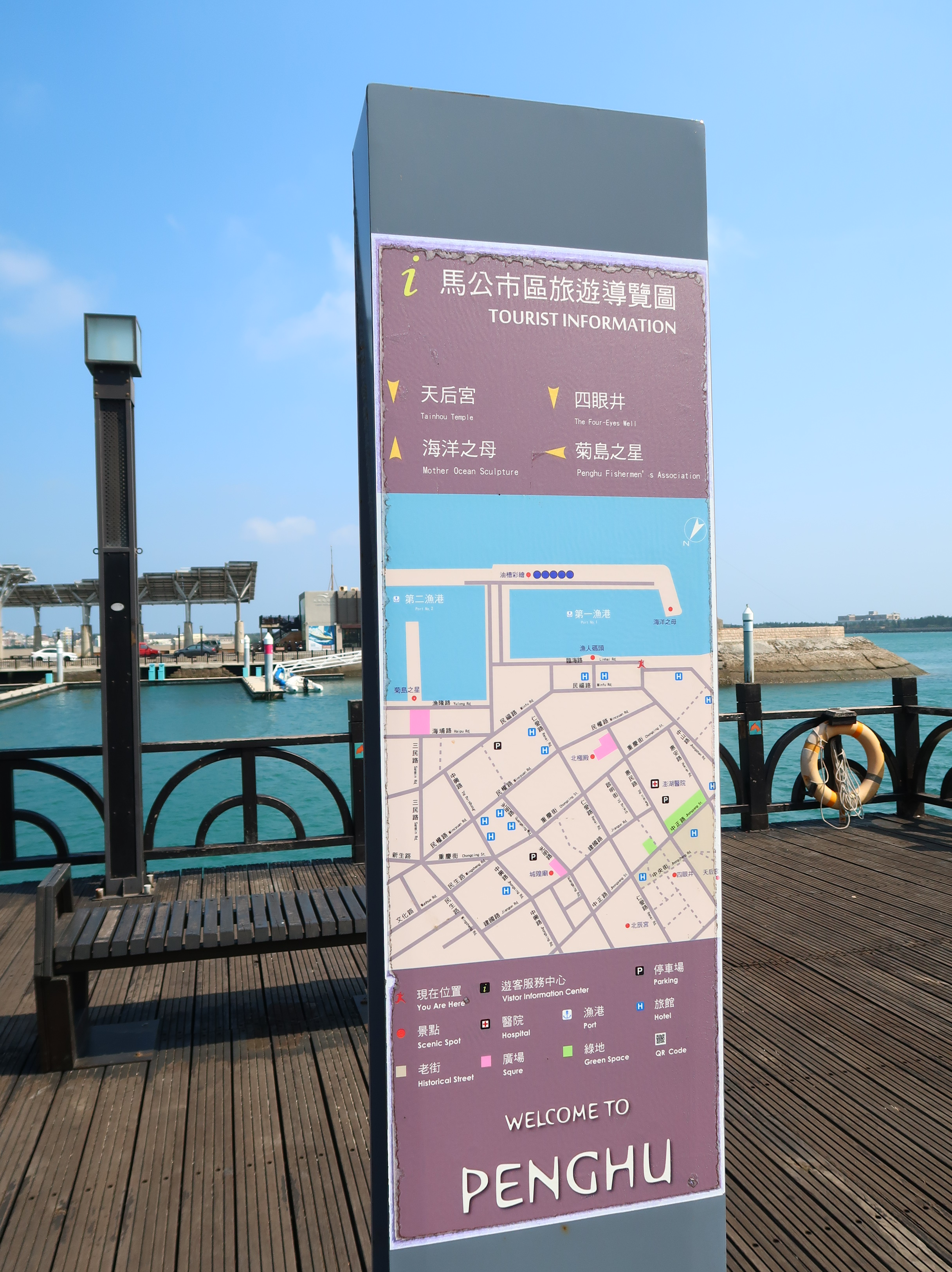
Guide Map

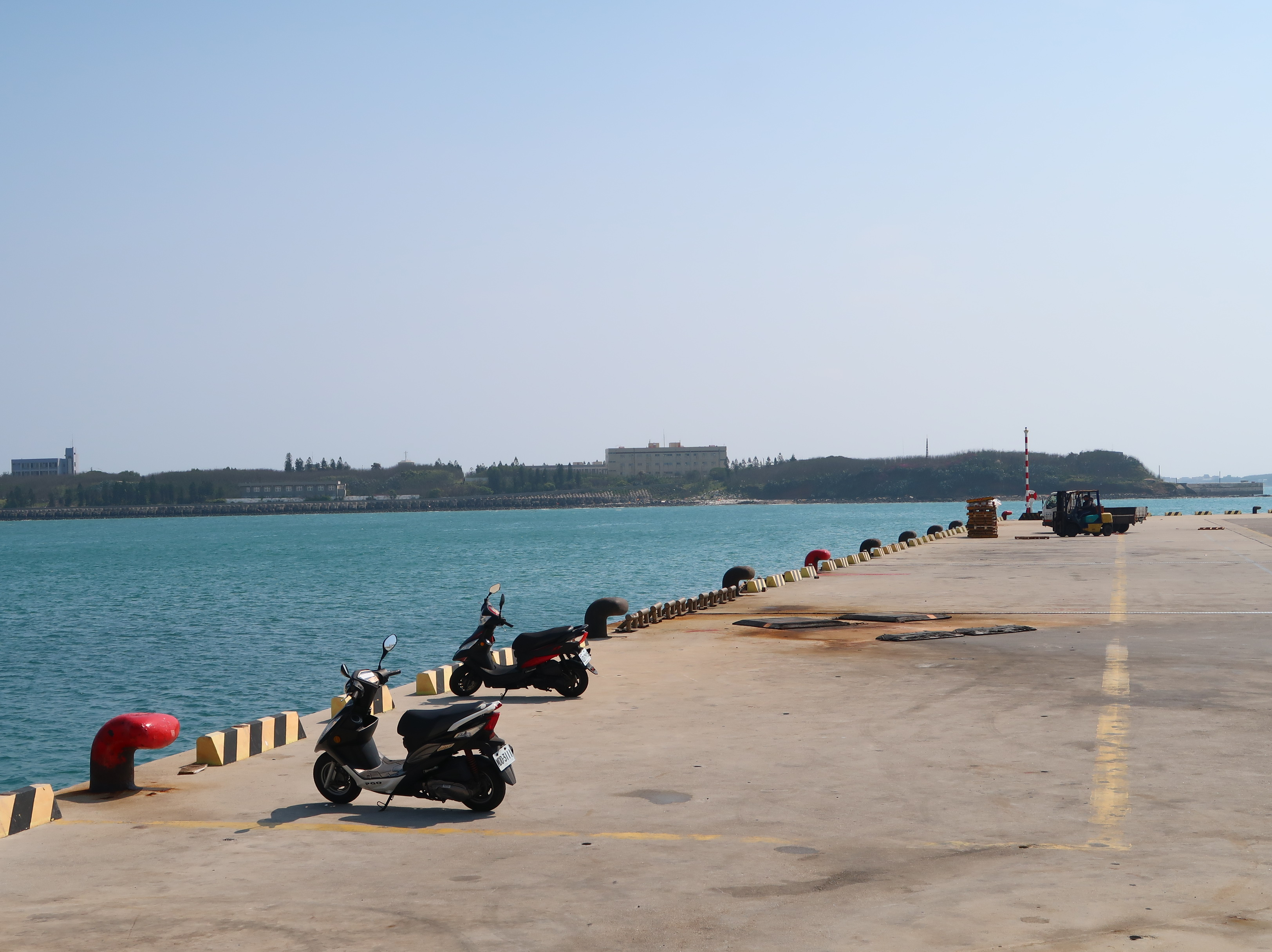
Pier

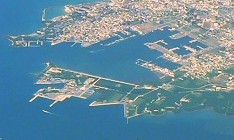
Aerial view of Magong Harbors

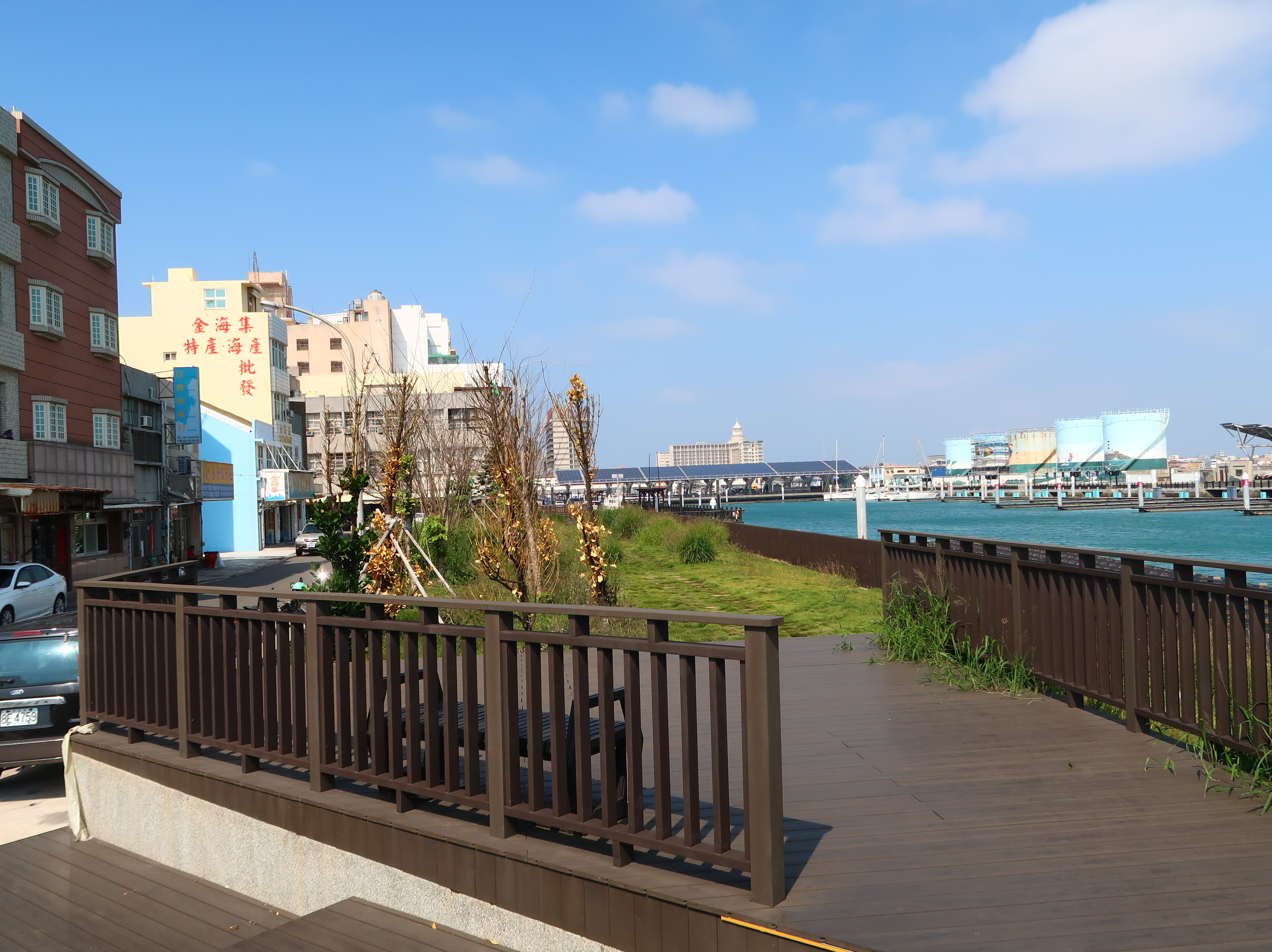
Harborfront Boardwalk

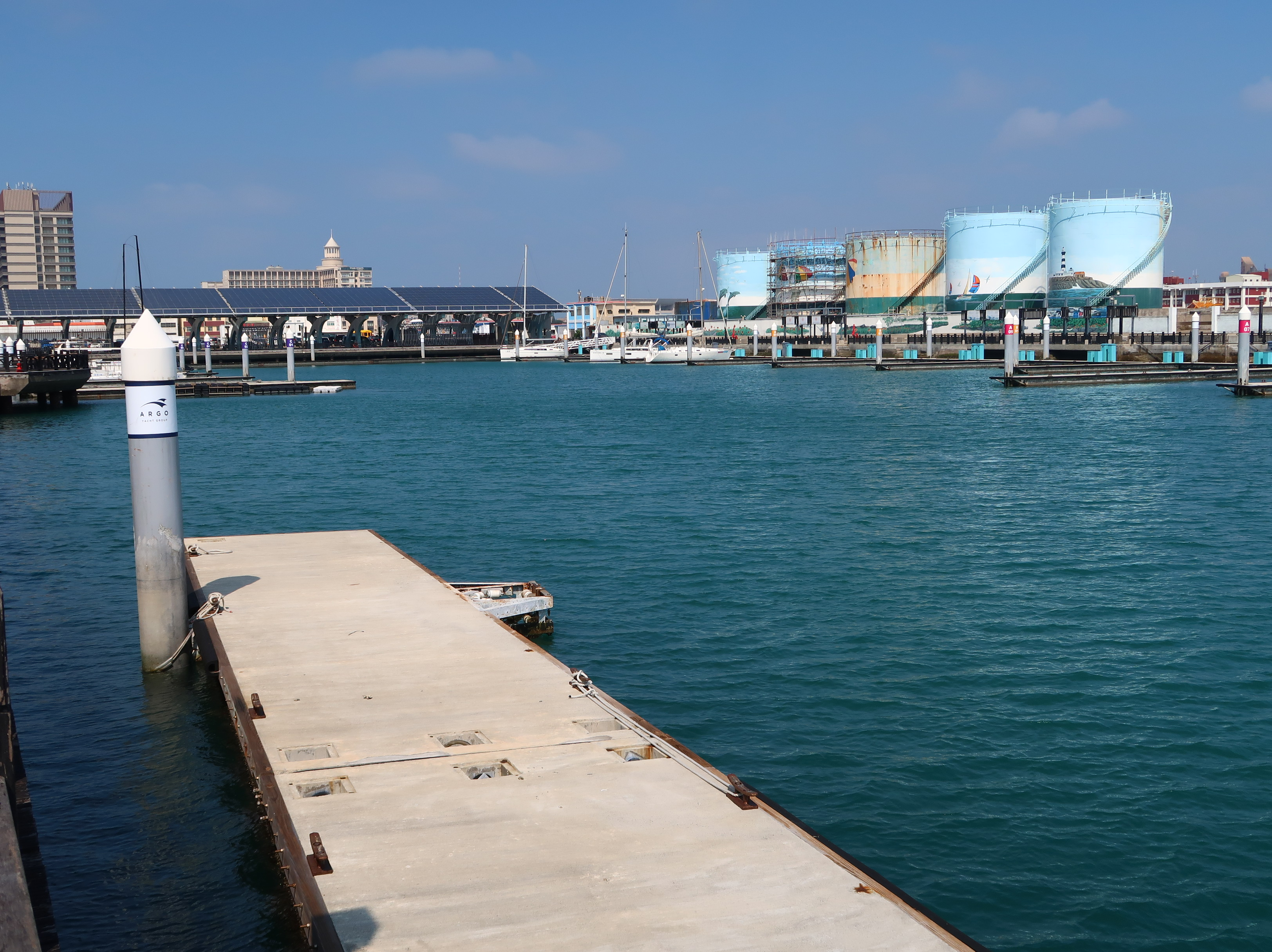
Painted Oil Storage Tank

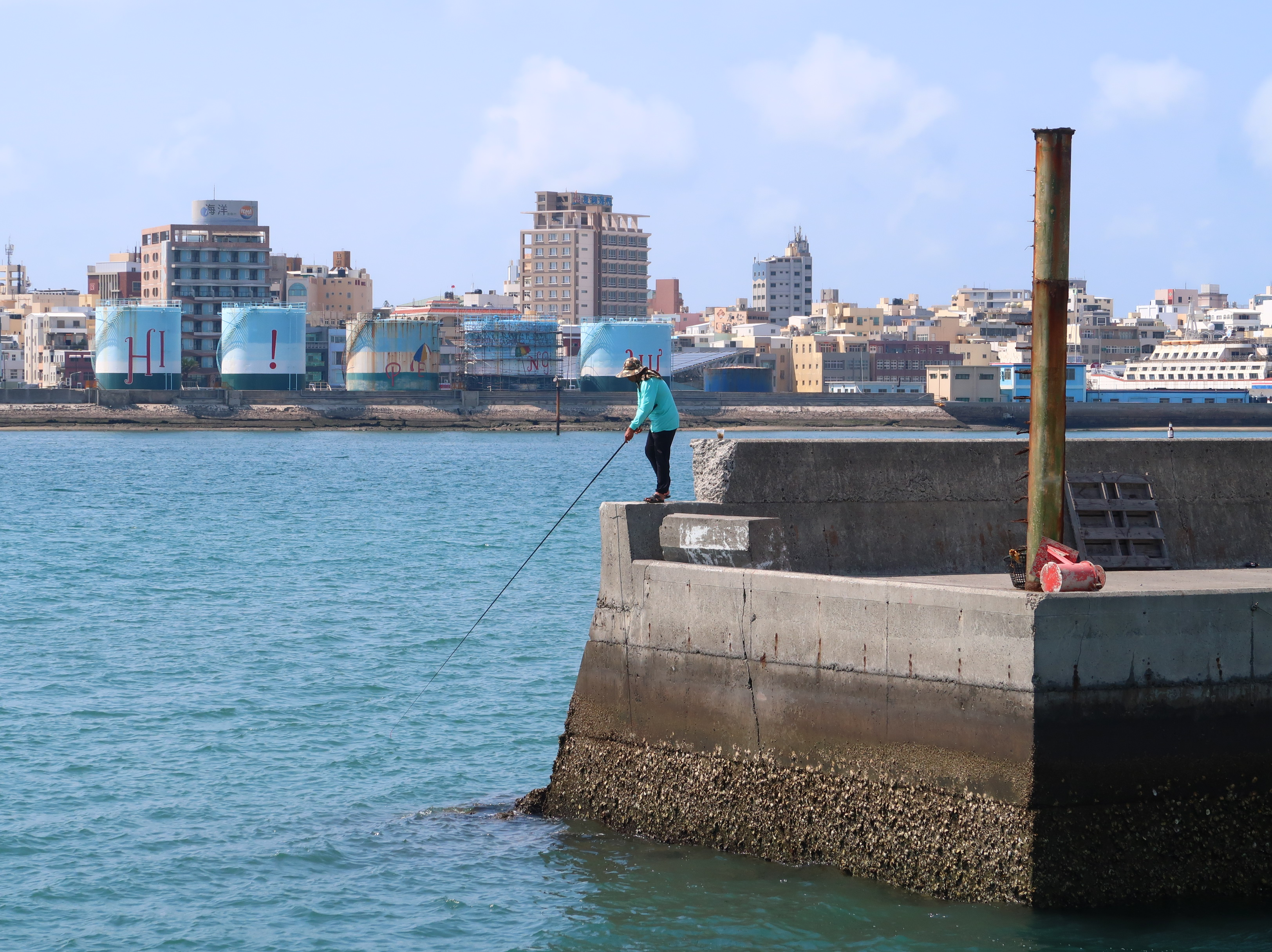
View from Anshan Village
