= Magong Third Fishing Port =

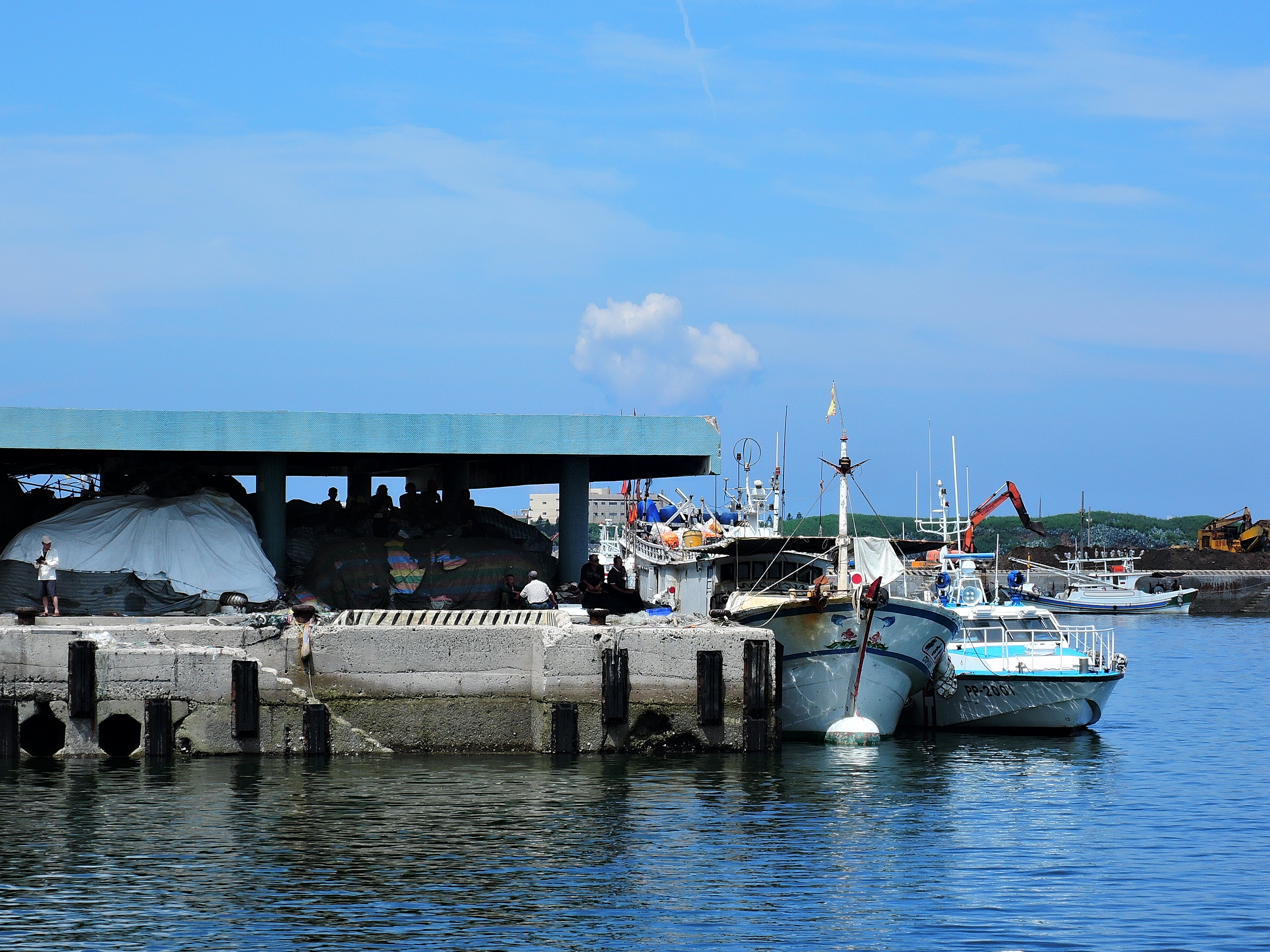
- Interactive map of Magong Third Fishing Port
- Native name: 馬公第三漁港

Location
- Country: Taiwan
- Location: Guangfu, Yangming, Hsiwen, Dongwen, Anshan Villages of Magong City, Penghu County, Taiwan 光復里、陽明里、西文里、東文里、案山里
- Coordinates: 23°33′51″N 119°34′32″E

Details
- Opened: 1980's (ROC 70's)
- Owned by: Penghu County Government

The Magong Third Fishing Port (Chinese: 馬公第三漁港; pinyin: Mǎ-gōng dì-san yú-gǎng; Wade–Giles: MA^{3} KUNG^{2} TI^{4} SAN^{1} YU^{2} KANG^{3}; Pe̍h-ōe-jī: Má-king Tuē-sann Hû-káng) is a fishing harbor in Magong City, Penghu County, Taiwan. It serves as both a recreational and a transportation port.

In the 1980s, the Taiwan Provincial Government launched the Taiwan Regional Fishing Harbor Construction Program in Penghu, under which the harbor was developed. By 2002, the total construction cost amounted to NT$1.5993 billion, carried out over four phases. This project represents the highest investment in harbor development across Penghu County and is home to the largest pier in the region.

== Background ==
Before the 1980s, Penghu's fishing industry was thriving. However, the combined total area of the existing Magong First and Second Fishing Ports was only about 6 hectares. This limited space long proved insufficient to accommodate the growing number of fishing vessels, berths, and docks. In response, government authorities planned the excavation and construction of a new harbor, leading to the initiation of the Magong Third Fishing Port project.

The reclamation area created during the construction of Magong Third Fishing Port encompassed the coastal zones of what are now Guangfu (光復里), Yangming (陽明里), Hsiwen (西文里), Dongwen (東文里), and Anshan Village (案山里) in Magong City. Formerly an extensive intertidal zone, the area was entirely transformed into reclaimed land through the port development project.

The construction plan for Magong Third Fishing Port was officially launched in 1980, largely driven by Lū An-tik (呂安德), the seventh Penghu County Magistrate. Lū An-tik studied architecture at a Nihon University in Japan and held professional experience as an architect.

Lū An-tik was nominated by the Kuomintang (KMT) and elected county magistrate in 1973. However, after his term ended in 1977, the KMT chose not to nominate him for re-election and instead endorsed Hsieh You-wen (謝有溫). Hsieh was successfully elected as the eighth Penghu County Magistrate in 1977 and served two terms (1977–1981 and 1981–1985), during which the main excavation and construction work for Magong Third Fishing Port took place.

== Construction Program ==
=== 1st Phase Program ===
At its inception, Magong Third Fishing Port was included in the “First Phase of the Taiwan Regional Fishing Harbor Construction Program.” The site was selected at Beiwang on the inner side of Magong Peninsula, using the northern breakwater of Magong Second Fishing Port as the construction location. The project aimed to accommodate 2,000 fishing vessels under 100 tons.

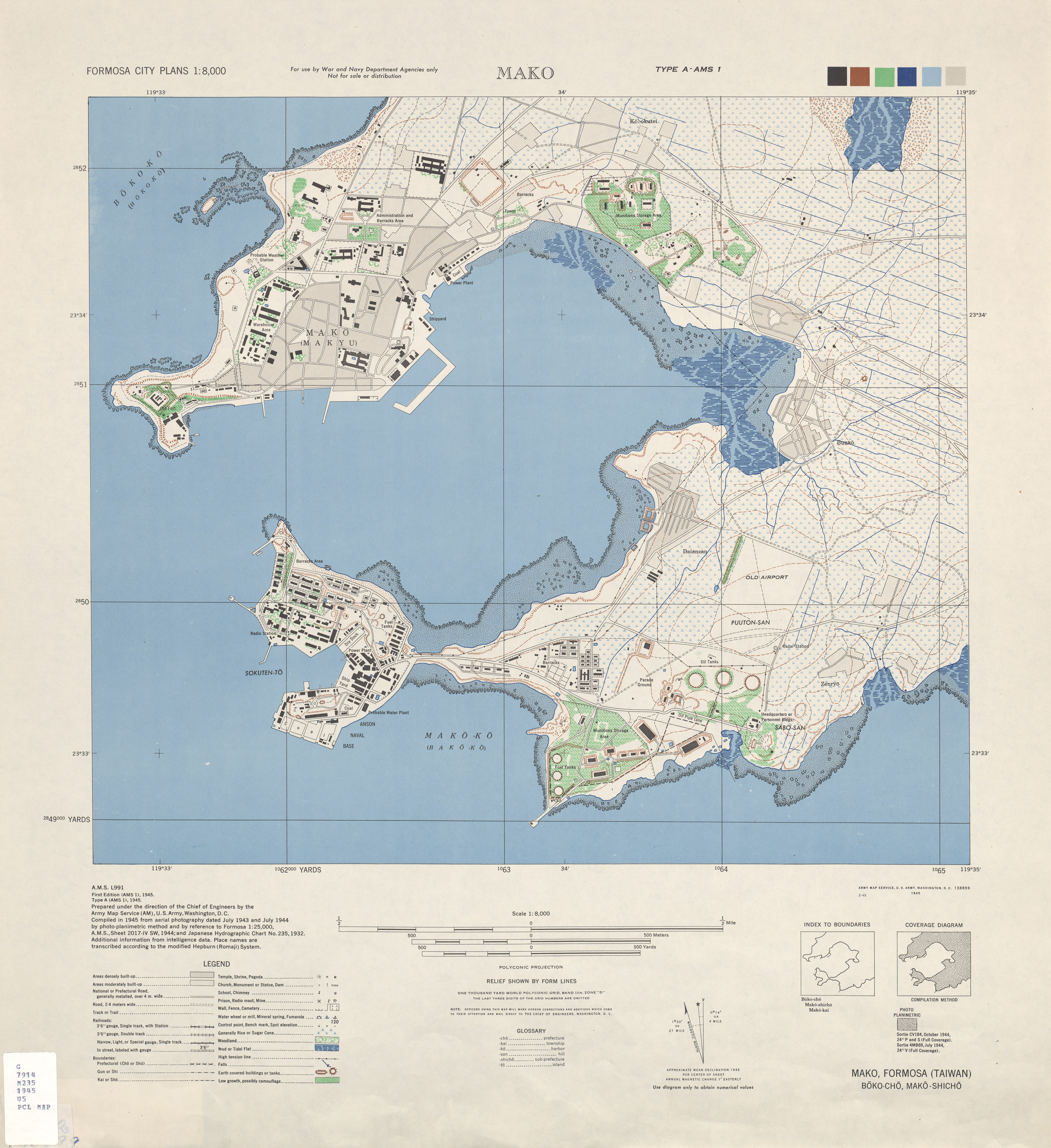
A 1945 image of Magong Commercial Port and the First Fishing Port, as charted by the U.S. military. At the time, the Second Fishing Port had not yet been constructed, and the Wen'ao ( Today's Hsiwen and Dongwen Village) and Anshan areas were still vast intertidal zones. After 1970, these intertidal areas disappeared, becoming reclaimed land for the construction of the Magong Third Fishing Port.

Construction began in 1981, creating a total of 29.4 berths with water depths ranging from 3.5 to 4 meters and a total quay length of 2,778 meters. Additional facilities included water supply and electrical pipelines for the harbor area, a surrounding access road, and a fish market. The reclaimed land area covered 34 hectares.

The “First Phase of the Taiwan Regional Fishing Harbor Construction Program” was subdivided into seven stages spanning seven years, concluding in 1987, with a total construction cost of NT$343 million.

=== 2nd Phase Program ===
From 1988 to 1993, the “Second Phase of the Taiwan Regional Fishing Harbor Construction Program” continued to be implemented. Originally budgeted at NT$360 million for Magong Third Fishing Port, this phase included dredging a berthing area of 33.9 hectares (with 4.6 hectares designated as deep-water berths), the construction of a deep-water dock area with a depth of minus 6 meters, and two protruding piers measuring 223 meters in length.

Additionally, approximately 3,600 meters of onshore public facilities were built, including a fish auction market, offices, lighting, water supply, and road paving. The total investment for this phase amounted to NT$830 million.

=== 3rd Phase Program ===
From 1997 to 2000, the “Third Phase of the Taiwan Regional Fishing Harbor Construction Program” invested NT$68.03 million to enhance berthing facilities for vessels. Two additional breakwater piers were constructed on either side of the fish market, with a combined length of 176 meters. Additionally, public facilities such as a parking lot, fishing gear repair area, and fishing gear warehouse were built.

=== 4th Phase Program ===
Between 2001 and 2002, the “Fourth Phase of the Taiwan Regional Fishing Harbor Construction Program” was carried out. During this phase, a 46-meter breakwater pier was constructed north of the Penghu Offshore Flotilla dock at Magong Third Fishing Port, and a 100-meter internal partition breakwater pier was built on the east side of the harbor area. The budget for this phase totaled NT$28.27 million.

=== Completion ===
Administrative divisions of Penghu County

According to Penghu County Gazetteer – Finance Section, edited by Lai Hui-min (賴惠敏) in 2005, the total reconstruction and improvement costs for the two Magong fishing harbors between 1950 and 1981 amounted to NT$31 million.

n 2002, the fourth phase of construction at Magong Third Fishing Port was completed, and the fishing port operations center in the Magong area was subsequently relocated there. The original Magong First Fishing Port and Second Fishing Port began to transition, and are now used primarily for tourism and recreational purposes.

== Ferry Terminal ==
In addition to providing berthing and operations for fishing vessels, the Penghu National Scenic Area Headquarters, Tourism Administration, MOTC has also established the "South Sea Visitor Center" at Magong’s Third Fishing Harbor, serving as a ticketing point for sightseeing boats.

Moreover, for those heading to outlying islands in the South Sea area, such as Hujing Island (虎井), Tongpan Island (桶盤), Hua Islet (花嶼), Wang’an Island (望安), and Qimei Island (七美), even Kaohsiang Port (高雄港),public transport ferries also dock at the Third Fishing Harbor for residents and travelers to board.

== Gallery ==
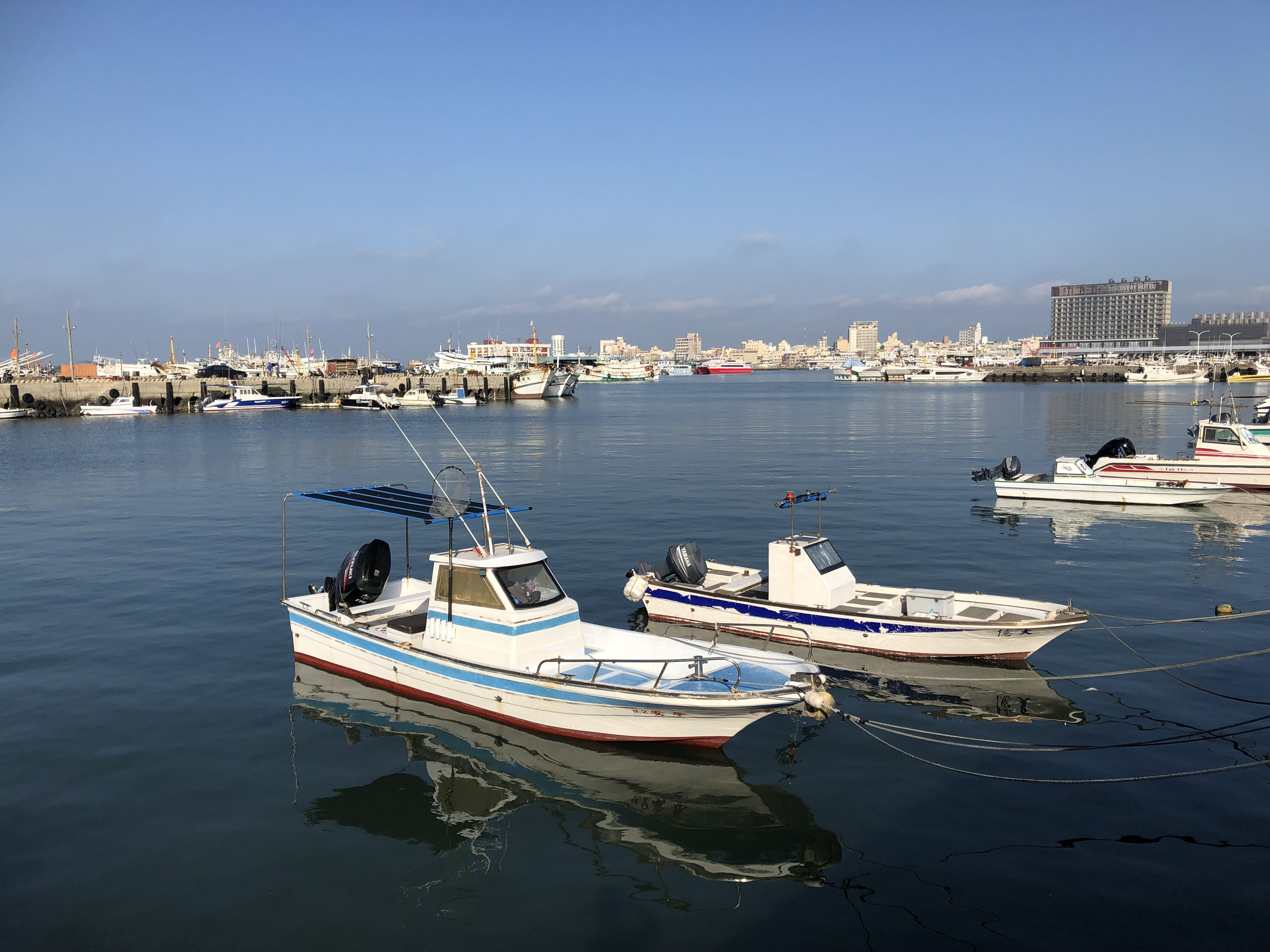
The view of port

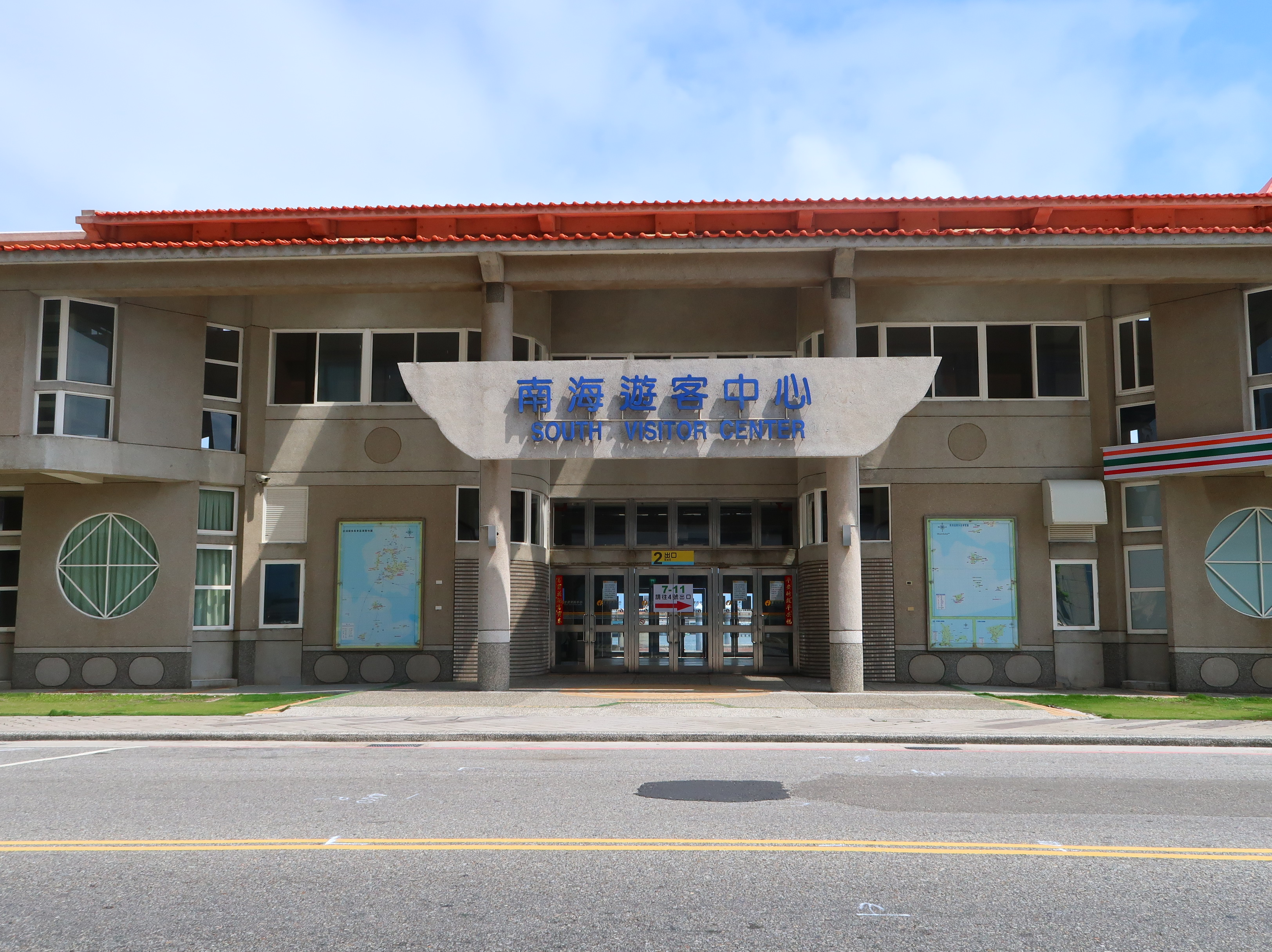
South Sea Visitor Center

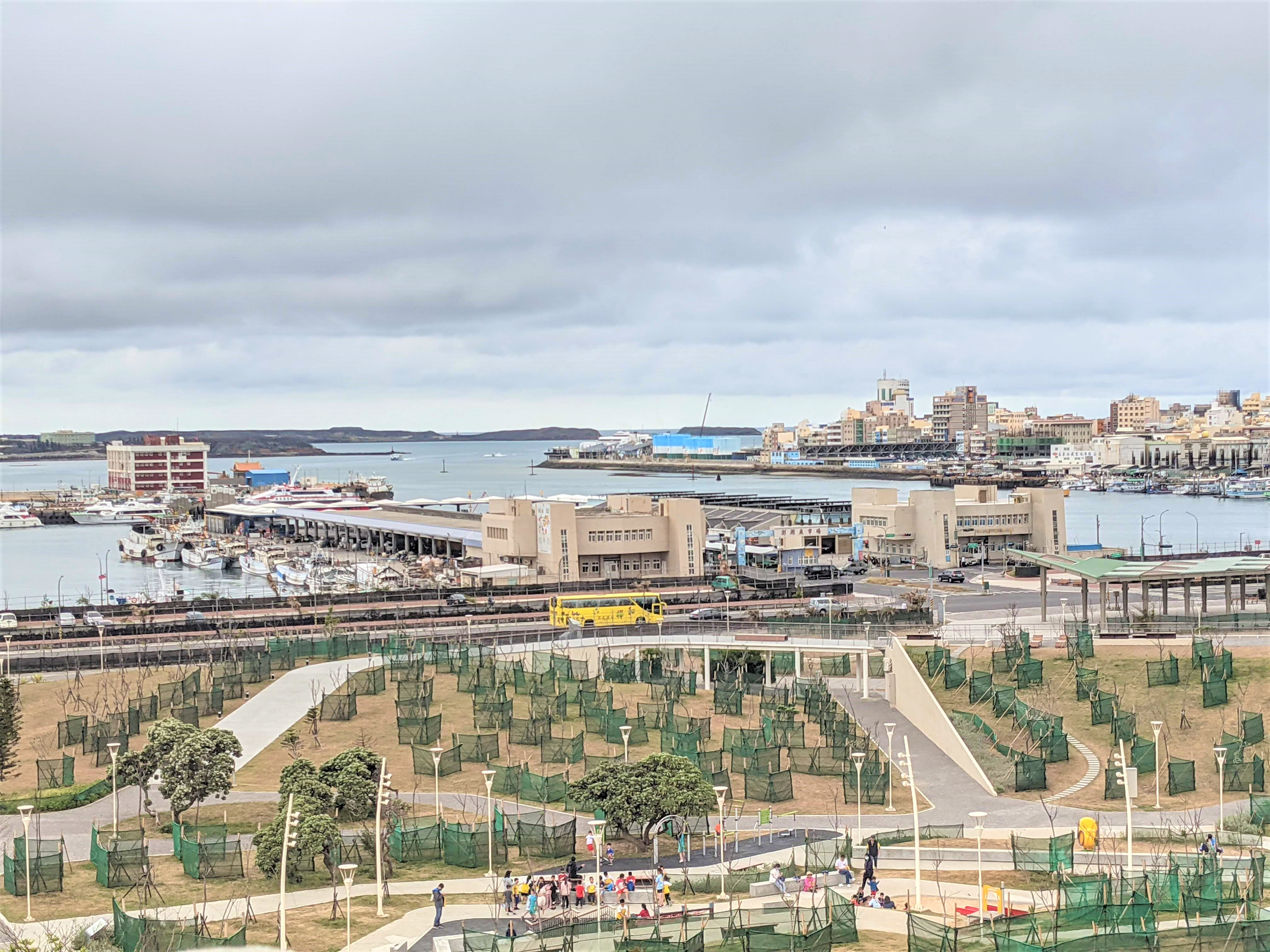
View of Port and Fish Market

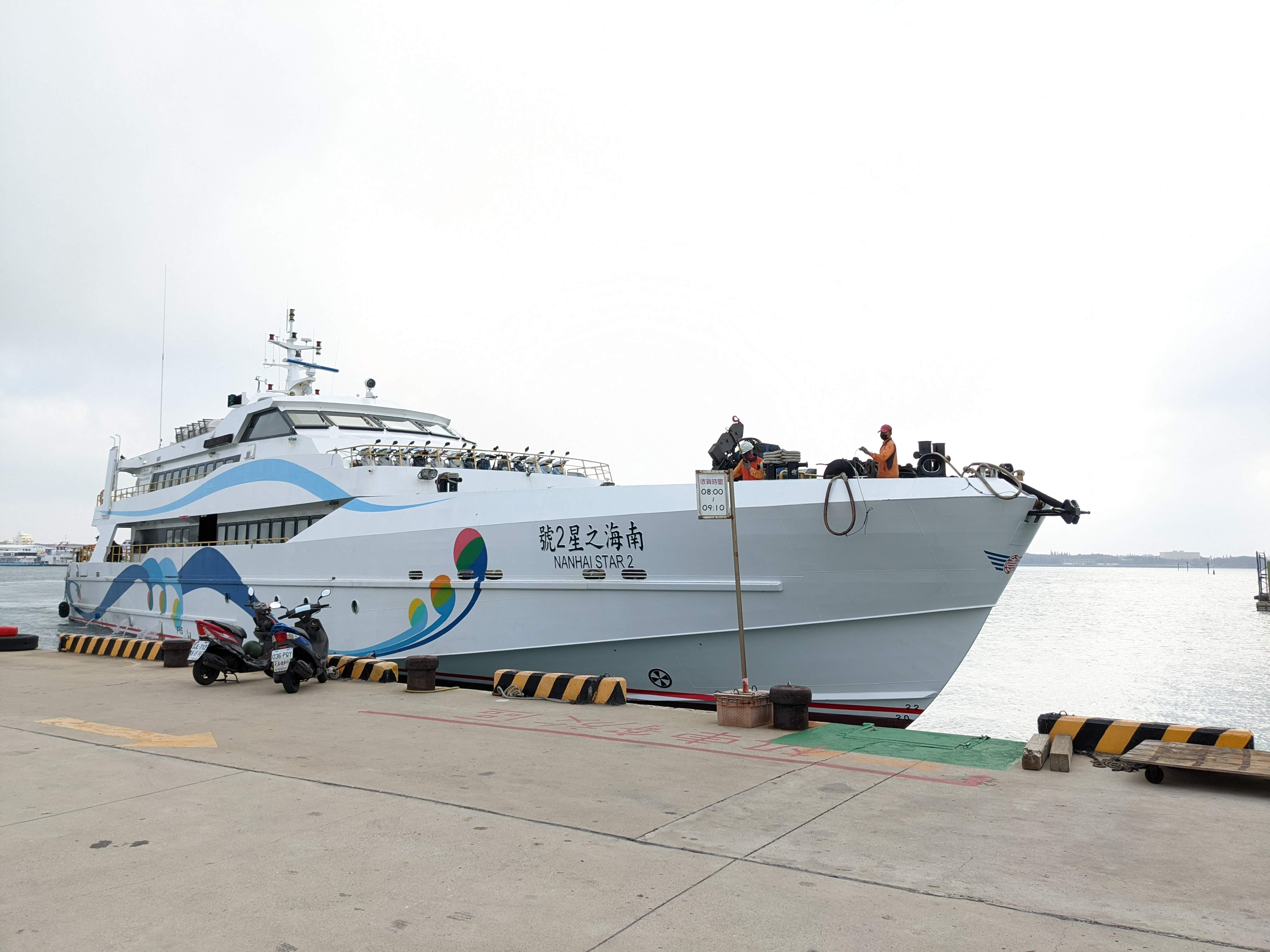
Nanhai Star No.2 (Public ferry to Wang'an and Qimei)

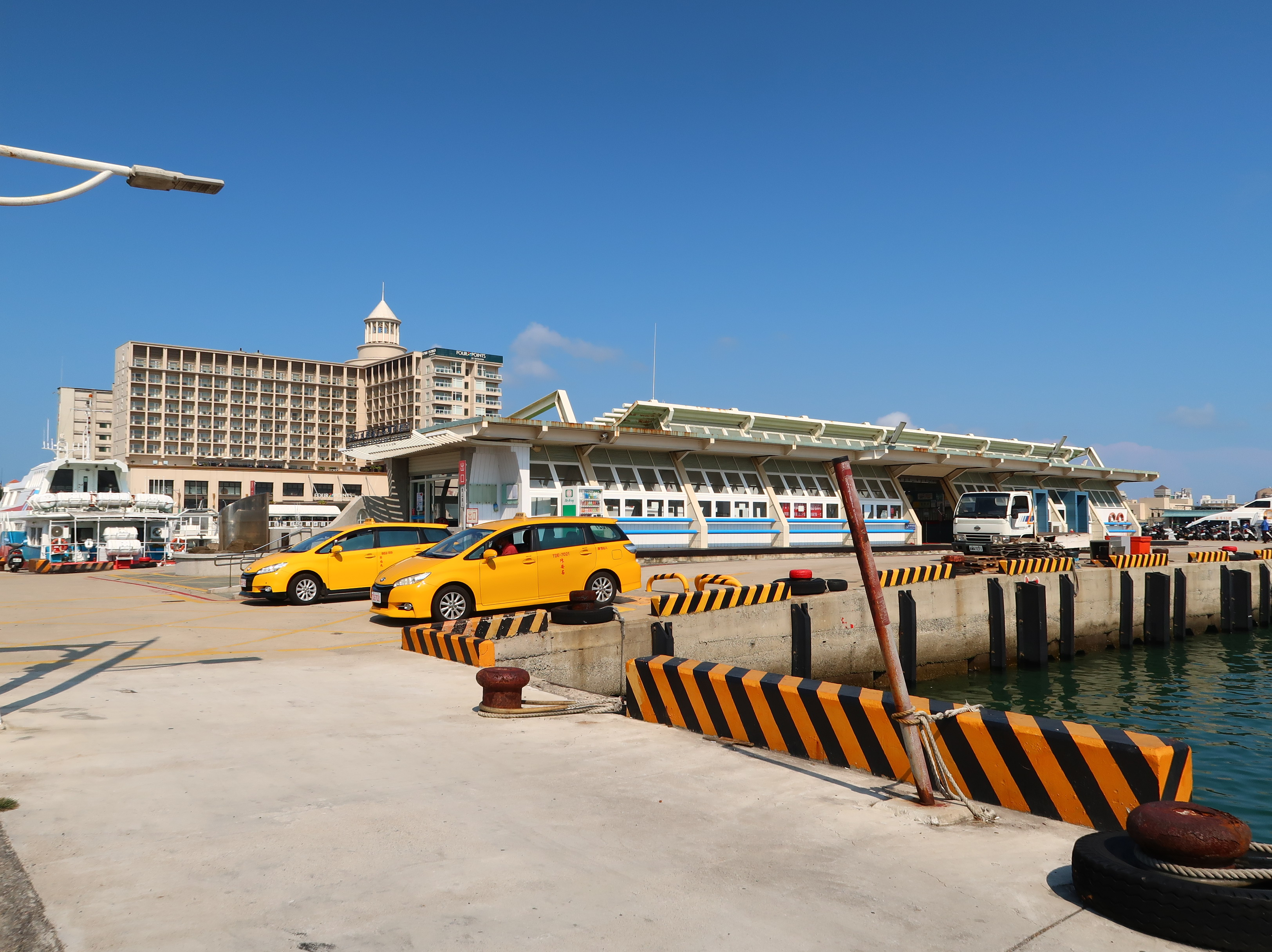
A waiting room for Nanhai Star

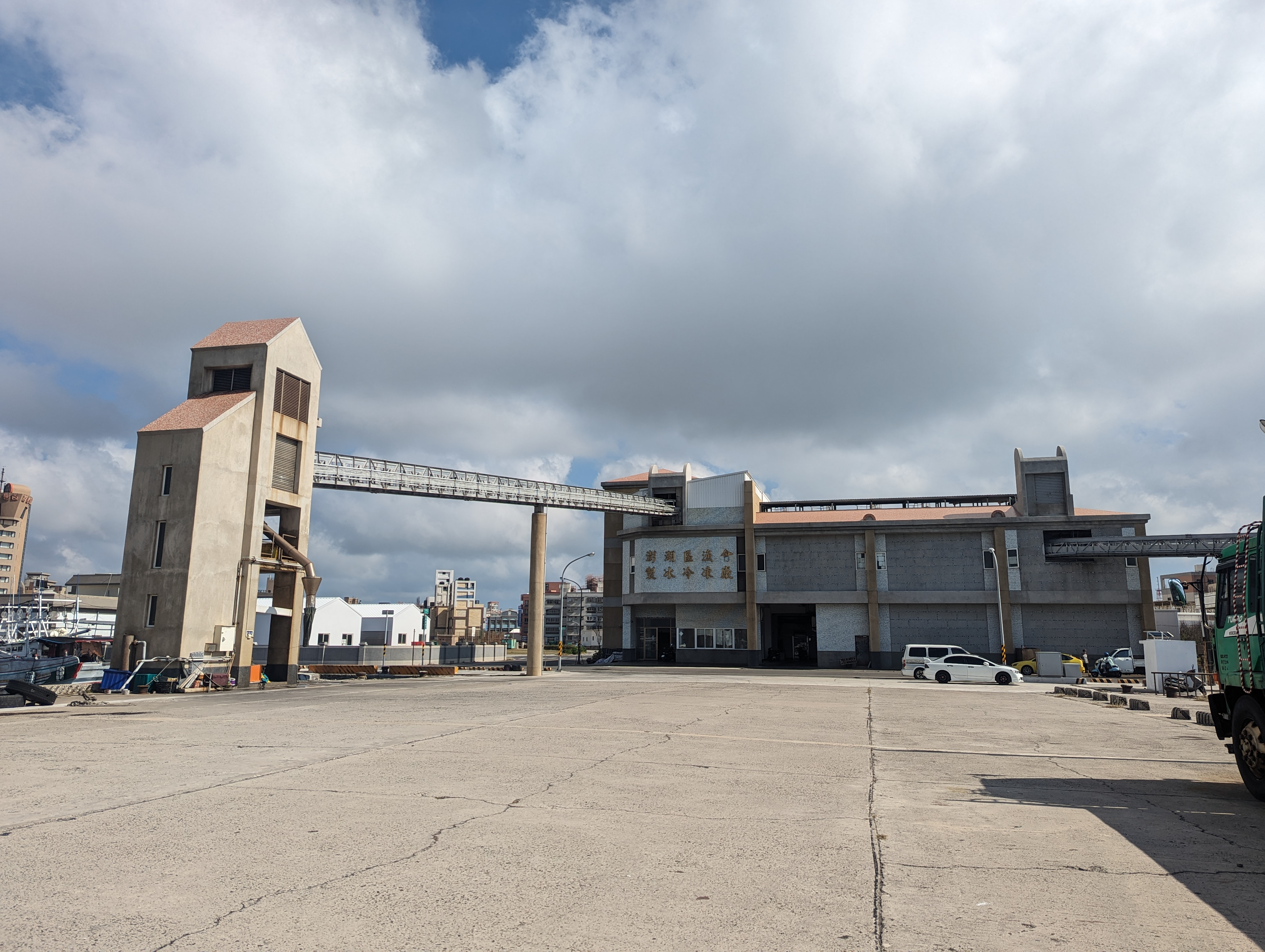
Ice and Cold Storage Plant

== See also ==
- South Sea Visitor Center
- Magong First Fishing Port
- Magong Second Fishing Port
