= Magong Old City Wall =

Defensive wall in Magong, Penghu, Taiwan

- 澎湖廳城
- Magong, Penghu, Taiwan
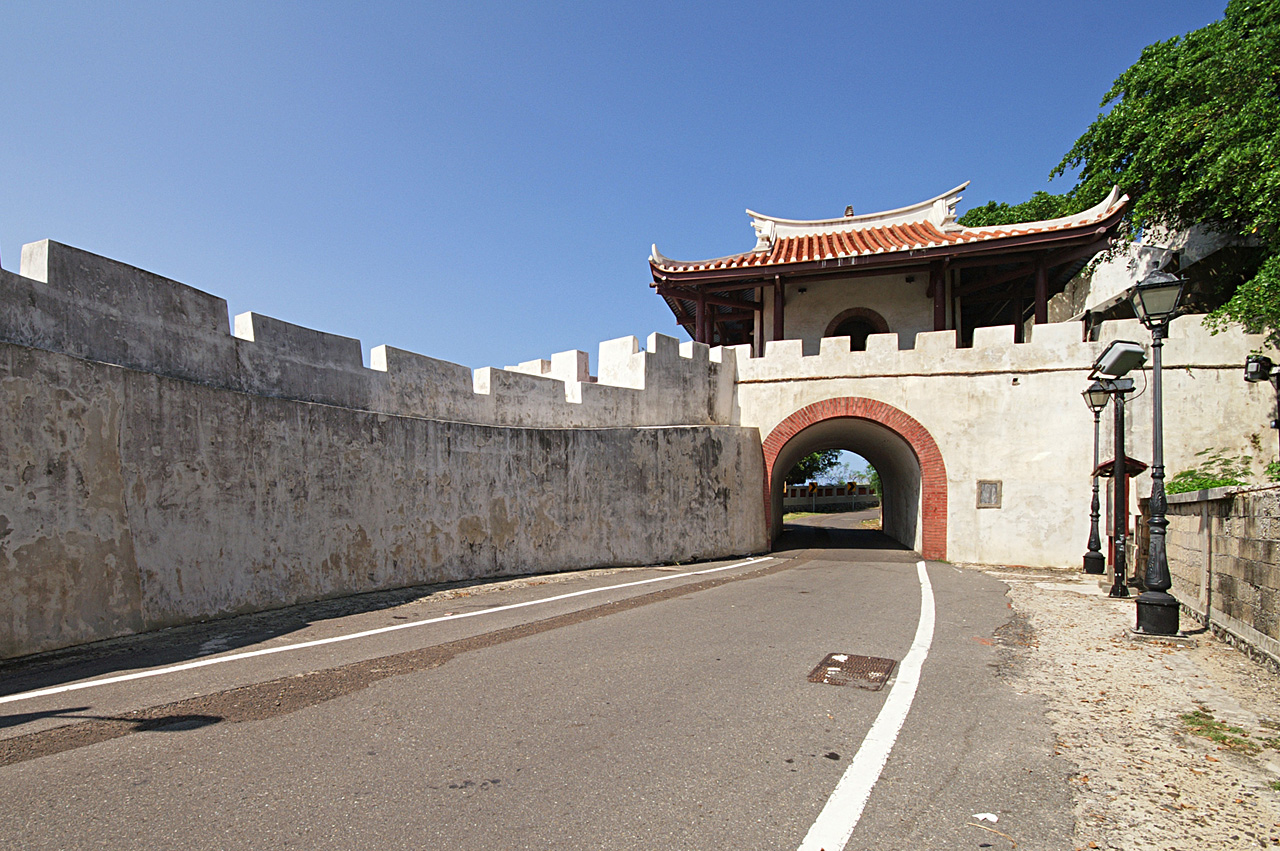

Site information
- Type: defensive wall

Location
- Coordinates: 23°33′46.9″N 119°33′44.5″E
- Length: 2,762 meters

Site history
- Built: 1887
- In use: 1889

The Magong Old City Wall (traditional Chinese: 澎湖廳城; simplified Chinese: 澎湖厅城; pinyin: Pēnghú Tīngchéng; Pe̍h-ōe-jī: Phêⁿ-ô͘ Thiaⁿ-siâⁿ) is an old defensive wall in Magong City, Penghu County, Taiwan.

== History ==
The construction of the wall started in 1887 and completed in 1889 during the Qing Dynasty rule. During the Japanese rule, the south wall, both of the south gates, north and east wall and gates were demolished to make ways for urban development. After the handover of Taiwan from Japan to the Republic of China in October 1945, the military perimeter west of the wall became part of Penghu Defense Command. The smaller west gate was then restored to its original form.

== Architecture ==
The wall spans over a length of 2,762 meters with 570 merlons on top of it. It consists of six gates in total.

== See also ==
- Hengchun Old City Wall
- Magong First Fishing Port
