= Penghu air raids =

Air raids over Penghu islands 1944–1945

- Part of the Pacific Theater of World War II
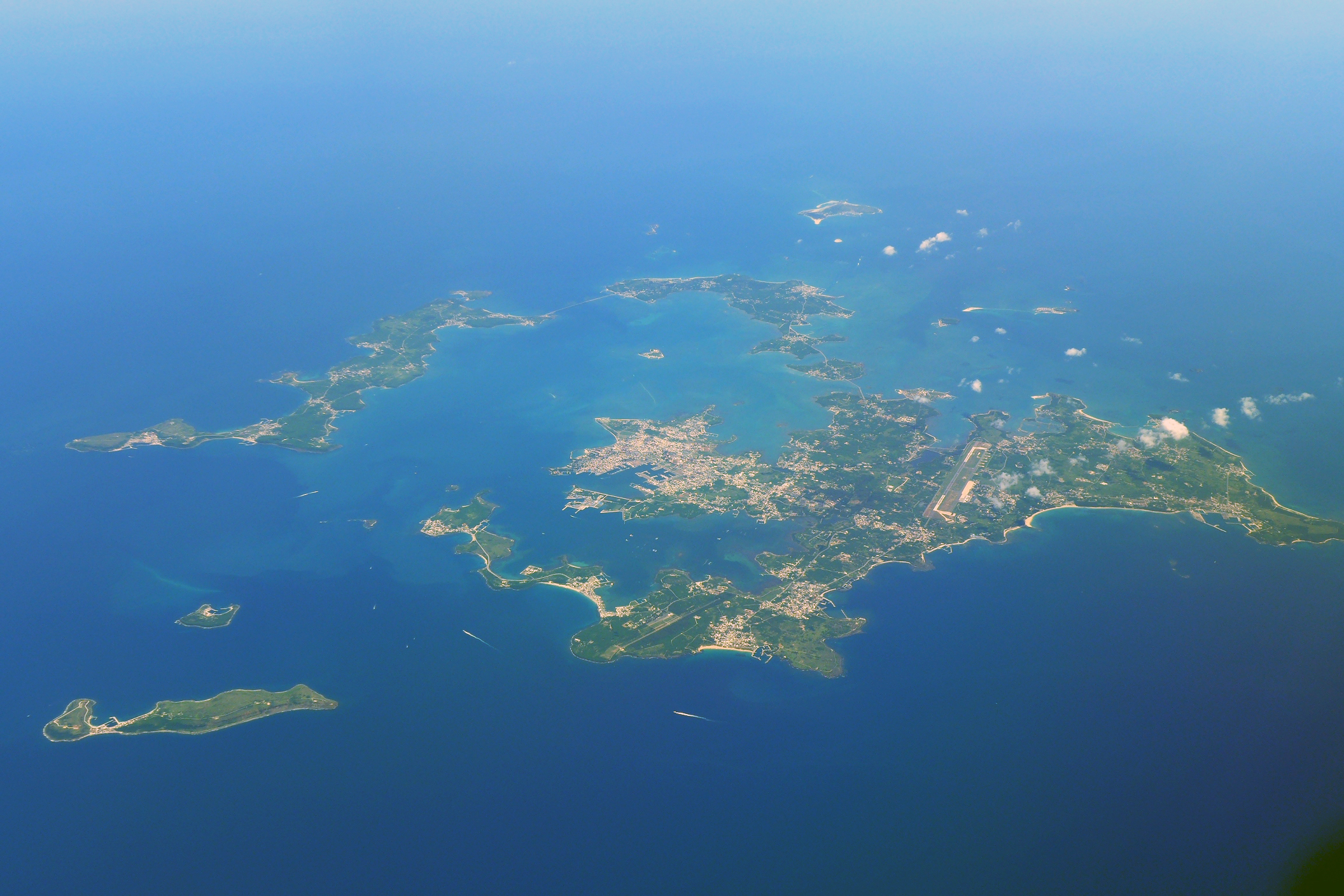
- Aerial View of the Penghu Islands
Date	12 October 1944 - 14 August 1945 (10 months and 2 days)
Location	Hōko Prefecture(Penghu), Japanese Taiwan, Empire of Japan 23°29′40″N 119°31′05″E
Result	American victory

Belligerents:
United States	Japan

Commanders and leaders
George Kenney; Marc Mitscher	Tsunejiro Katahara; Shinshiro Souma

Units involved
Fast Carrier Task Force; Fifth Air Force; Thirteenth Air Force; USS Lexington (CV-16); USS Essex (CV-9)	

The Penghu air raids were a series of air raids over the Japanese controlled Penghu Islands (Hōko Prefecture) by Allied bombers from 12 October 1944, to 14 August 1945. It began in relation to the Formosa Air Battle but continued long after the latter's conclusion.

The air raids resulted in the mass destruction of infrastructure and military hardware on the islands, most notably at Magong due to the presence of major Japanese naval bases in the city.

== Background ==
In 1901, in view of the strategic position of Penghu Island in the Taiwan Strait, the Japanese government announced on 2 July that Penghu was to be a "fortress". The "Penghu Fortress Command" was established thereafter.

On 7 July 1937 the Marco Polo Bridge incident broke out, beginning the Second Sino-Japanese War. On 15 August, all of Japanese-controlled Taiwan entered into a war economy. In June 1939, the Japanese army used Penghu as an advance base to attack Mainland China from Shantou, Guangdong.

Since 1943, the situation in the Pacific War has become increasingly dire for the Japanese. In view of the barren land and large population in Penghu, it became difficult for the Japanese to supply grain by sea, leading to a real risk of food shortage. Residents were evacuated to Formosa and special liaison officers were stationed in Budai, Tainan Prefecture, and Takao Prefecture.

In the early days Japan chose Magong as the site for the construction of a major naval headquarters, and forced the residents to relocate to other places. In 1901, the Magong Port Department was formally established. In 1929, Japan once again expropriated the land around Mount Daian on the opposite bank for the construction of fuel tanks. In 1941, the Magong Yao Port Department was upgraded to the Magong Garrison Office. In 1943, the command center of the Garrison Office was moved to Kaohsiung's Zuoying district. In addition to auxiliary support facilities such as radio stations, port warehouses, and oil tanks, the hinterland of the base also became the main strategic target for the Allied fighters to attack Penghu.

After the Magong air raid on 14 March 1945, the offices in various parts of Penghu were dispersed. Except for a few civil servants who stayed behind in Magong, most of the residents of Magong street went to the suburbs. At that time, Magong Street was in ruins with few people. It was not until the end of World War II that it gradually restored its original appearance.

== Air raids ==
On 12 October 1944 the Formosa Air Battle broke out. From 12 to 14 October, the U.S. Navy's Fast Carrier Task Force sent various carrier-based aircraft to bomb Formosa and Penghu. The first air raid in Penghu happened during this period, and as early as 8 October, four days before the first air strike, Magong Street had made preparations in advance to evacuate some school children and Japanese family members to prevent harm.

The mission to attack Penghu on 12 October 1944, was carried out by the USS Lexington and the USS Essex of the Fast Carrier Task Force; aircraft involved in the battle, including Grumman F6F Hellcats, Curtiss SB2C Helldivers and Grumman TBF Avengers, from dawn to dusk respectively weapons such as machine guns, rockets, bombs, and air-dropped torpedoes, launched a total of four waves of offensives against Penghu Cetian Island Naval Base, Zhumushuhui Airfield and surrounding facilities.

At the beginning of January 1945, in preparation for the invasion of Lingayen Gulf, the Fast Carrier Task Force once again attacked various places in Formosa and Penghu. From mid-January of the same year, the Fifth Air Force of the U.S. Army Air Force took over the air strikes on Formosa and Penghu, in cooperation with the armed reconnaissance and patrol missions carried out by land-based patrol aircraft of the U.S. Navy. In August 1945, it was replaced by the Thirteenth Air Force.

From 1944 to 1945 the total military and civilian population of the Penghu Office was about 79,000. Because Penghu had many military sites deemed important, it became a major target of bombing by the Allied Forces. Among them, the Fifth Air Force dropped a total of 1,127 tons of bombs on Penghu in the last 200 days of the war.
