= Magong Harbor =

Harbor in Magong, Penghu, Taiwan

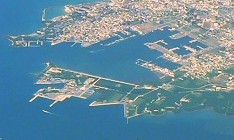
- Interactive map of Magong Harbor
- Location within Taiwan
- Native name: 馬公港

Location
- Location: Magong, Penghu, Taiwan
- Coordinates: 23°33′37.9″N 119°34′14.0″E

The Magong Harbor (traditional Chinese: 馬公港; simplified Chinese: 马公港; pinyin: Mǎgōng Gǎng; Pe̍h-ōe-jī: Má-keng-káng) is a harbor in Magong City, Penghu, Taiwan.

== History ==
In 2015, Taiwan International Ports Corporation invested NT$1.1 billion to create the Penghu Pier to accommodate cruise liners, to make Magong Harbor a world class cruise terminal. The pier was expected to be launched in early 2018.

== Architecture ==
The harbor has 9 docks with total length of 956 meters.

== Destinations ==
The harbor serves boat trips to Kaohsiung, Tainan and Chiayi.

== See also ==
- Transportation in Taiwan
