= Hōko Prefecture =

Administrative division of Taiwan during the Japanese rule

Hōko Prefecture 澎湖廳
- Hōko-chō
- 1895-1952
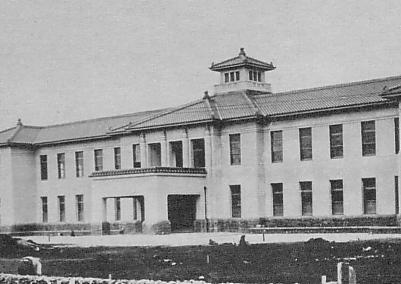
- The Hōko Prefecture government building now serves as the Penghu County Government building.
- Population
  - 1941: 69,387
- Historical era: Taiwan under Japanese rule
  - Established: 1895
  - Disestablished: 25 October 1945
  - Treaty of San Francisco: 28 April 1952
- Political subdivisions: 2 subprefectures (支廳)
- Today part of: Penghu County

Hōko Prefecture
- Traditional Chinese: 澎湖廳
- Simplified Chinese: 澎湖厅
Transcriptions
Standard Mandarin
- Wade–Giles: P'êng Hu2 T'ing
Hakka
- Pha̍k-fa-sṳ: Phâng-fû-thang
Southern Min
- Hokkien POJ: Phêⁿ-ô͘-thiaⁿ
- Tâi-lô: Phênn-ôo-thiann

Hōko Prefecture (澎湖廳, Hōko-chō) was one of the administrative divisions of Taiwan during the Japanese ruling period from 1895 until 1945. The prefecture consisted of modern-day Penghu County.

== Population ==
Total population	69,387
Japanese	3,619
Taiwanese	65,694
Korean	74
1941 (Showa 16) census.

== Administrative divisions ==
=== Subprefectures ===
Before its dissolution in 1945 (Shōwa 20), Hōko Prefecture consisted of 2 subprefectures.

1. Makō Subprefecture (馬公支廳)
2. Mōan Subprefecture (望安支廳)

=== Towns and Villages ===
The districts were divided into towns (街) and villages (庄).

District	Name	Japanese	Notes
Makō 馬公支廳	Makō town	馬公街	Today Magong City
Makō 馬公支廳	Kosei village	湖西庄	Today Huxi Township
Makō 馬公支廳	Hakusa village	白沙庄	Today Baisha Township
Makō 馬公支廳	Seisho village	西嶼庄	Today Xiyu Township
Mōan 望安支廳	Mōan village	望安庄	Today Wang'an Township
Mōan 望安支廳	Taisho village	大嶼庄	Today Cimei Township

== See also ==
- Administrative divisions of Taiwan
- Governor-General of Taiwan
- Political divisions of Taiwan (1895–1945)
- Taiwan under Japanese rule
