= Qilaibi Lighthouse =

Lighthouse in Hualien City, Hualien County, Taiwan

Cilaibi Lighthouse 奇萊鼻燈塔
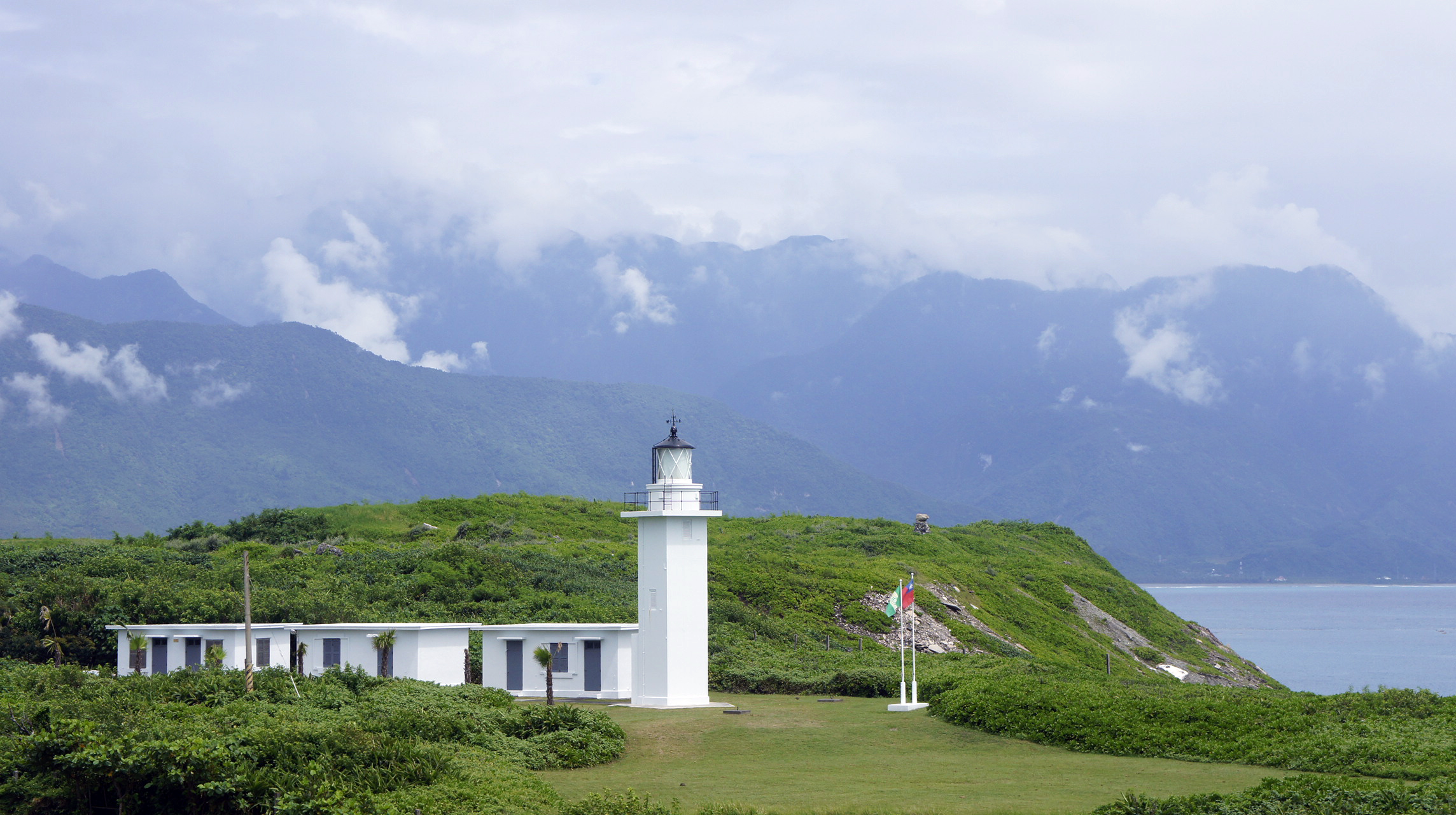
- Location: Qilaibi, Hualien County, Taiwan
- Coordinates: 24°00′58″N 121°38′38″E

Tower
- Constructed: 1963
- Construction: concrete
- Height: 13 m (43 ft)
- Shape: pentagonal prism
- Markings: white (tower), white (lantern), black (dome)
- Operator: Maritime and Port Bureau

Light
- First lit: 1964
- Focal height: 33.4 m (110 ft)
- Lens: fourth order Fresnel lens
- Intensity: 28,000 candela
- Range: 16.6 nmi (30.7 km; 19.1 mi)
- Characteristic: Iso W 6s

Qilaibi Lighthouse (Chinese: 奇萊鼻燈塔; Hanyu Pinyin: Qíláibí Dēngtǎ; Tongyong Pinyin: Cíláibí Dengtǎ) is a lighthouse in Qilaibi, Hualien City, Hualien County, Taiwan. Today the lighthouse is overseen by the Customs Administration of the Ministry of Finance. The lighthouse is built between the Central Mountain Range and the Pacific Ocean. The lighthouse is not open to the public all year around.

== Name origin ==
The lighthouse takes its name from Kiray, a former name of Hualien City and a name used in the Hualien area that refers to the Sakiraya people.

== History ==
=== Japanese rule period ===
The original lighthouse was built by the Japanese in 1931. The building is 7.6 meters high, concrete and white. The acetylene flashing light once used in this lighthouse utilized pressure-regulated acetylene and a timing device, to flash once at a regular 3-second interval. During World War II, the lighthouse was seriously damaged by Allied bombing.

=== Present ===
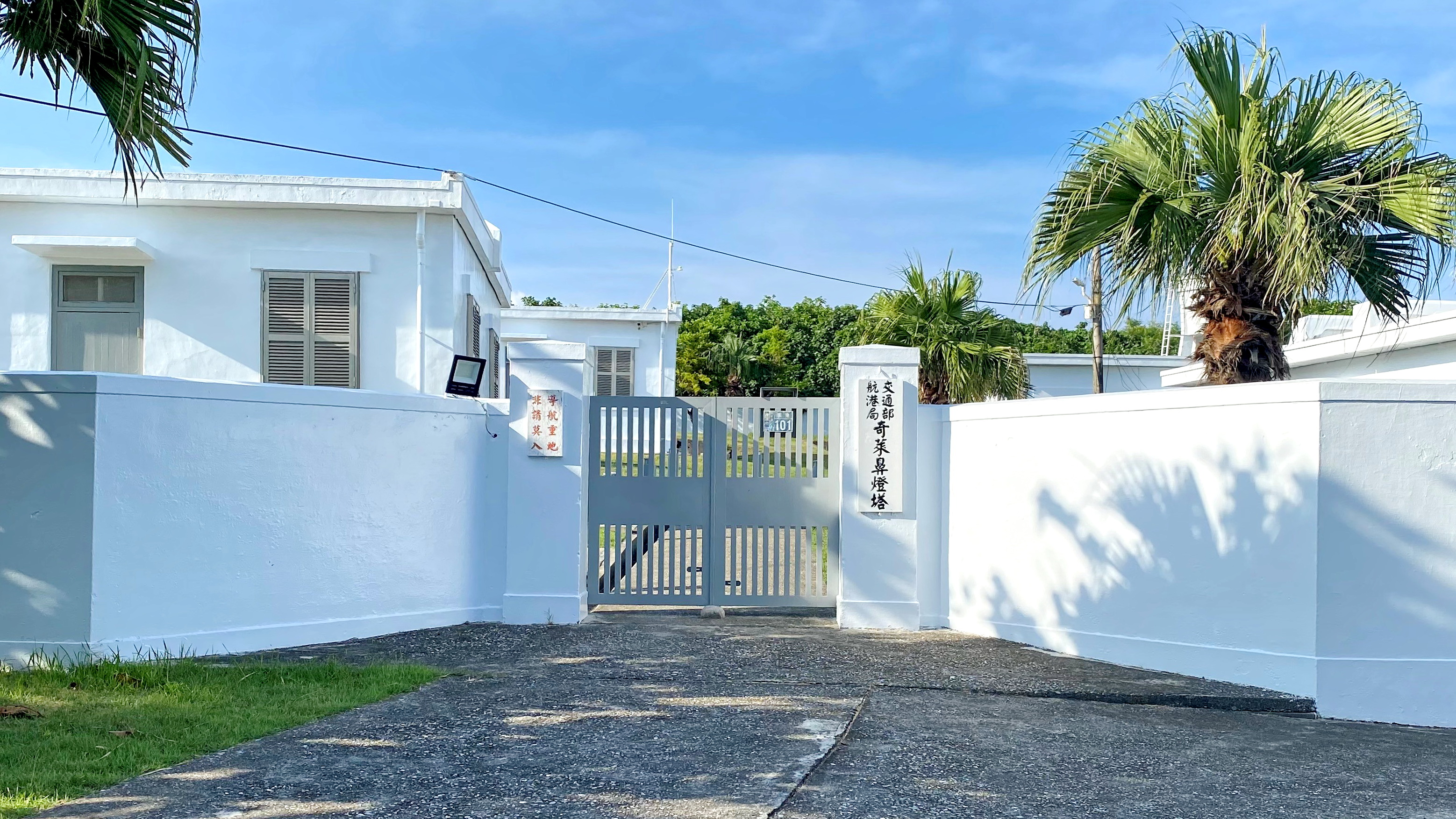
The front gate of the Qilaibi Lighthouse

In 1963, in order to help nearby Hualien Harbor become an international port, a new lighthouse, consisting of a white pentagon concrete building, was built on the original lighthouse base. The newly built Qilaibi Lighthouse used a 4th class white light electric lamp, the light flashing 3 seconds and dimming 3 seconds at a regular 6 second intervals, and the luminous intensity is 28,000 cd. In 1973, a non-directional beacon pole was added, with output power 100 watts and range 100 nms, to function in coordination with the Lyudao Lighthouse, also a non-directional beacon pole, for the ships mutual positioning. In 1985, a radar beacon pole was set. Then finally, in 1992, the communication systems were comprehensively changed into a dual-frequency radar beacon pole.

== See also ==
- List of lighthouses in Taiwan

== Sources ==
1. Su-fang Li, "The Lighthouses in Taiwan", Yuan-zu Culture Publ. Inc., Taipei county, Taiwan, 2002, pp. 138–141. ISBN 957-28031-2-3 (in Chinese)
2. Lun-hui Yue, "Ocean Navigator-The Fair of Taiwan Lighthouses", Kaoshiung History Museum, Kaoshiung, 2000, pp. 74–77. ISBN 957-02-7455-7 (in Chinese)
3. Customs, Ministry of Finance of Taiwan, "The Concise History of the Republic of China Customs", Taipei, 1998. ISBN 957-00-4861-1 (in Chinese)
