= List of lighthouses in Taiwan =

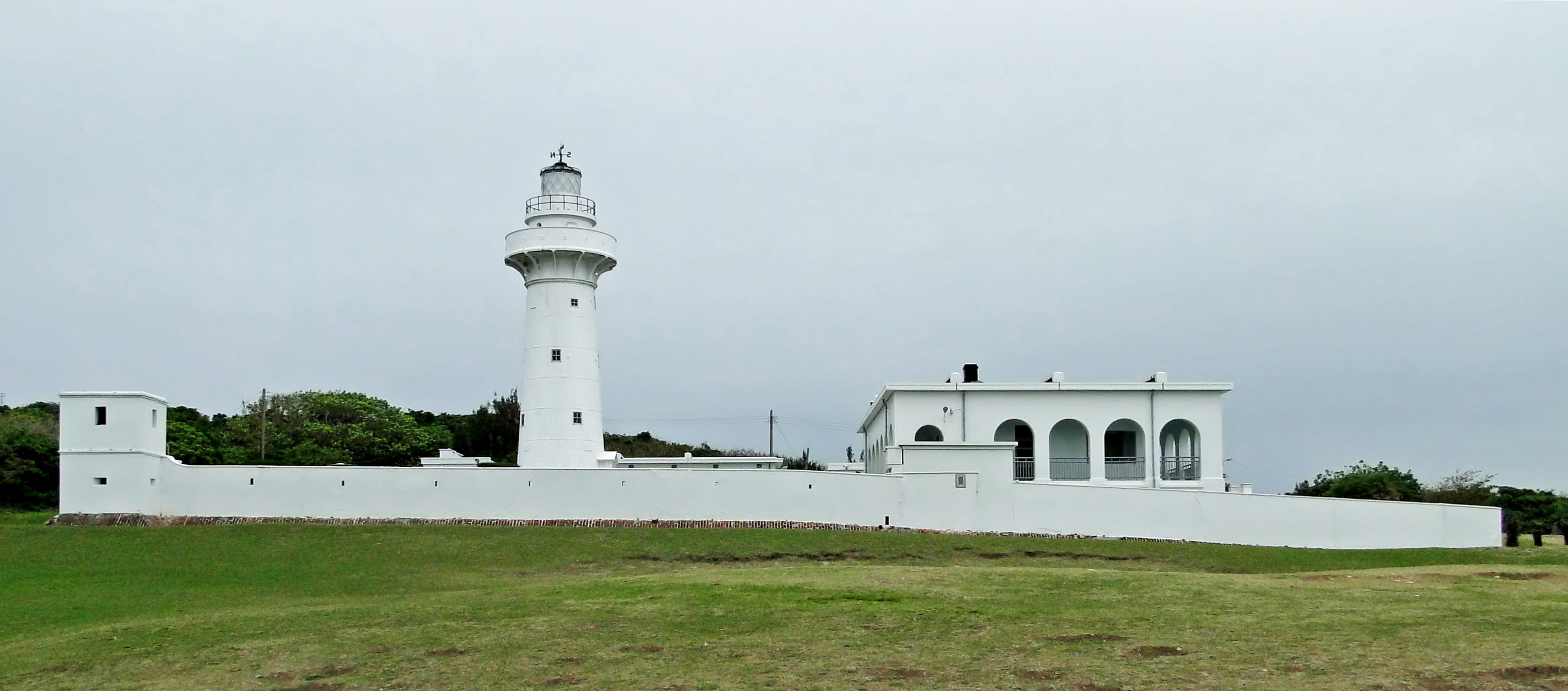
Eluanbi Lighthouse

This is a list of lighthouses and lightvessels in Taiwan.

== Northern Taiwan ==
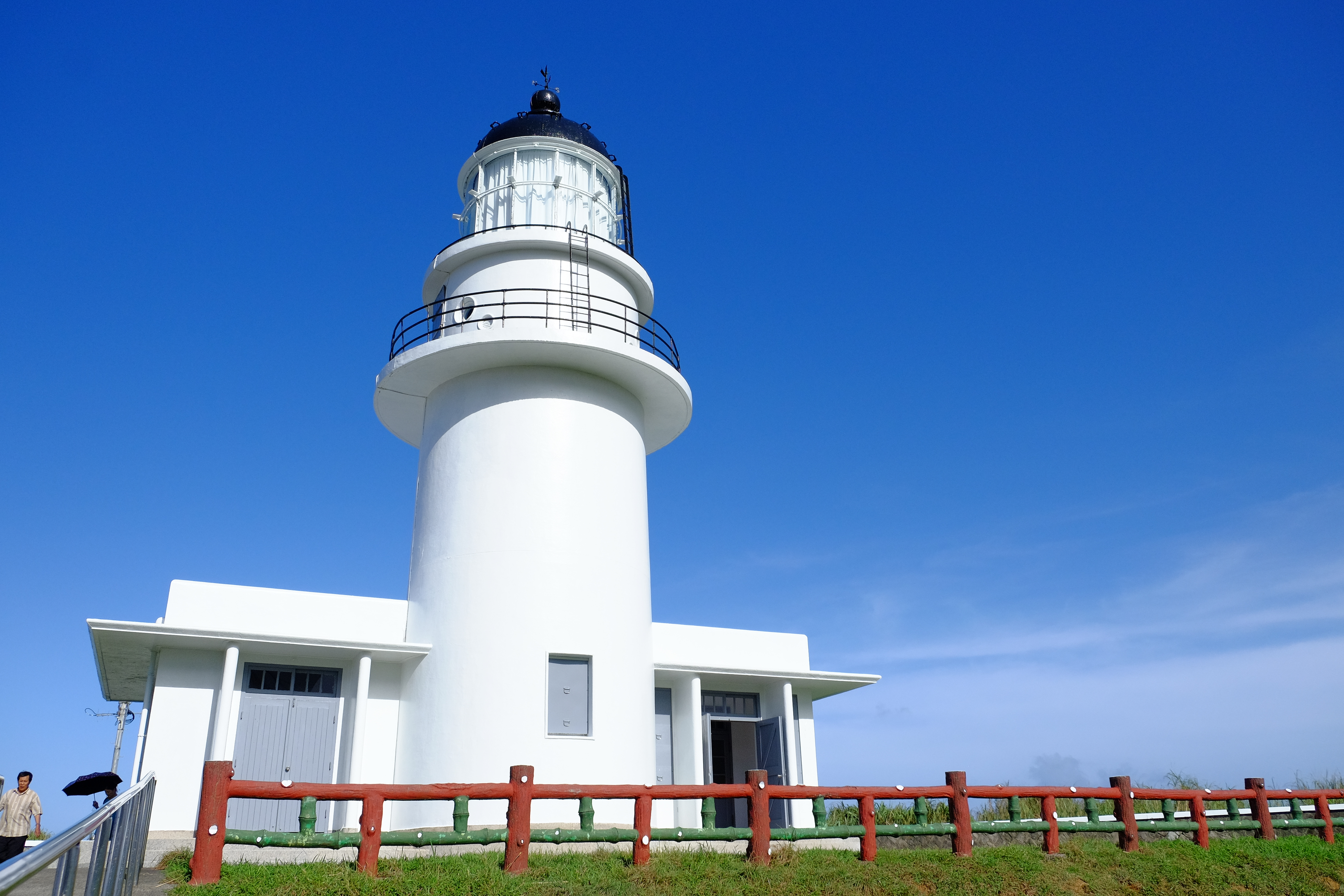
Cape San Diego Lighthouse

- Pengjia Lighthouse (Chinese: 彭佳嶼燈塔) (Pengjia Islet, Keelung) 25°38′N 122°04′E
- Keelung Island Lighthouse (Chinese: 基隆嶼燈塔) (Keelung Islet, Keelung) 25°12′N 121°47′E
- Keelung Lighthouse (Chinese: 基隆燈塔) (Keelung Harbor, Keelung)25°09.5′N 121°44.4′E
- Ciouzishan Lighthouse (Chinese: 球子山燈塔) (Keelung Harbor, Keelung)
- Tamsui Harbor Lighthouse (Chinese: 淡水港燈塔) (Tamsui District, New Taipei) 25°11′N 121°25′E
- Yeliou Lighthouse (Chinese: 野柳燈塔) (Wanli District, New Taipei) 25°13′N 121°41′E
- Fuguijiao Lighthouse (Chinese: 富貴角燈塔) (Shimen District, New Taipei) 25°17′53.2″N 121°32′11.83″E
- Bitoujiao Lighthouse (Chinese: 鼻頭角燈塔) (Ruifang District, New Taipei) 25°08′N 121°55′E
- Cape San Diego Lighthouse (Chinese: 三貂角燈塔) (Gongliao District, New Taipei) 25°01′N 122°00′E
- Baishajia Lighthouse (Chinese: 白沙岬燈塔) (Guanyin District, Taoyuan City) 25°03′N 121°04′E

== Central Taiwan ==
- Gaomei Lighthouse (Chinese: 高美燈塔) (Qingshui District, Taichung City)
- Taichung Port Lighthouse (Chinese: 台中港燈塔) (Wuqi District, Taichung City) 25°19′N 120°31′E
- Fangyuan Lighthouse (Chinese: 芳苑燈塔) (Fangyuan Township, Changhua County) 23°58′N 120°19′E
- Wengangduei Lighthouse (Chinese: 塭港堆燈塔) (Kouhu Township, Yunlin County)

== Southern Taiwan ==
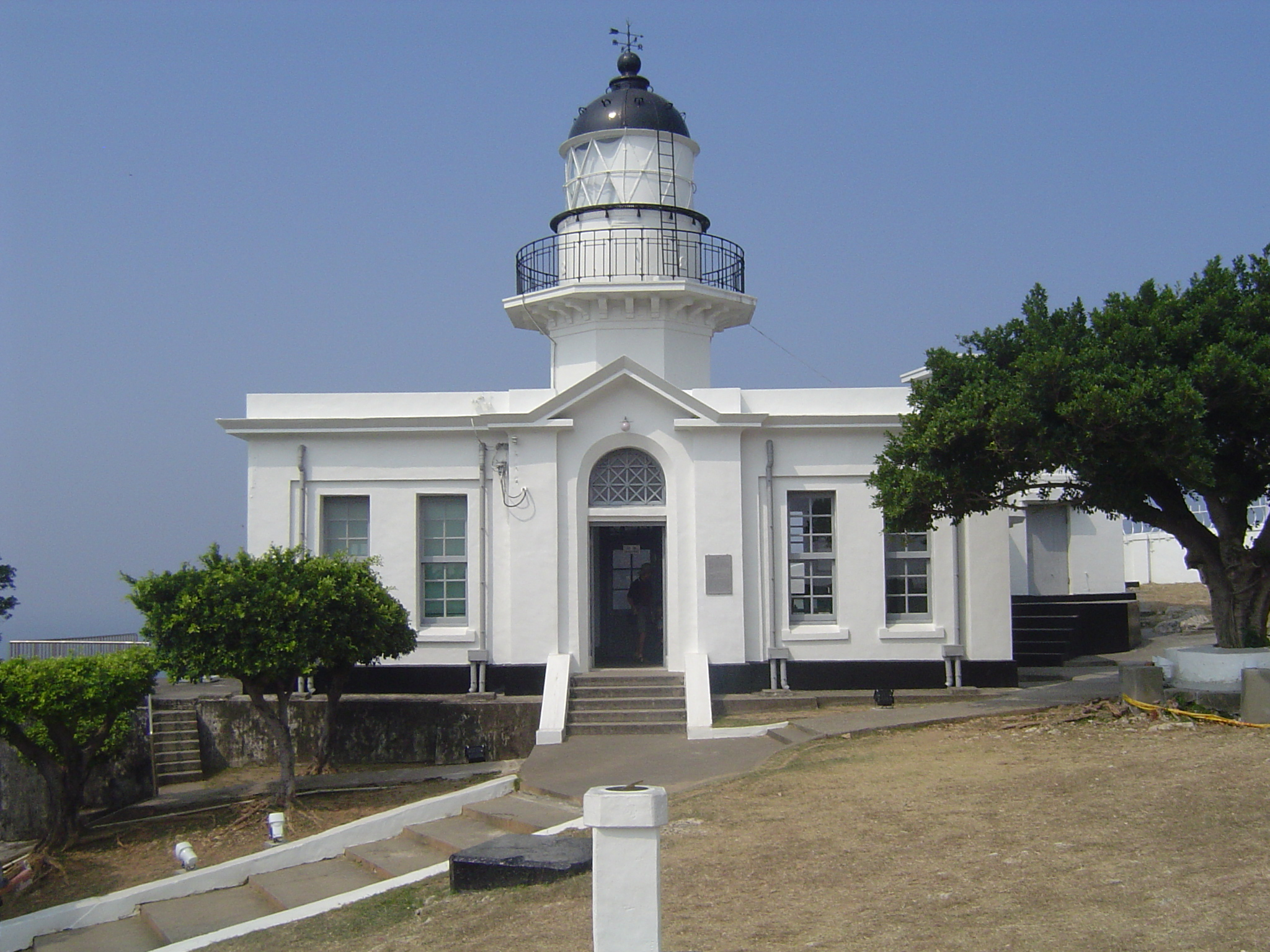
Kaohsiung Lighthouse

- Guosheng Port Lighthouse (Chinese: 國聖港燈塔) (Cigu District, Tainan City) 23°06′N 120°02′E
- Anping Lighthouse (Chinese: 安平燈塔) (Anping District, Tainan) 23°00′N 120°08′E
- Kaohsiung Lighthouse (Chinese: 高雄燈塔) (Cijin District, Kaohsiung) 22°37′N 120°15′E
- Eluanbi Lighthouse (Chinese: 鵝鑾鼻燈塔) (Hengchun Township, Pingtung County) 21°54′N 120°51′E

== Eastern Taiwan ==
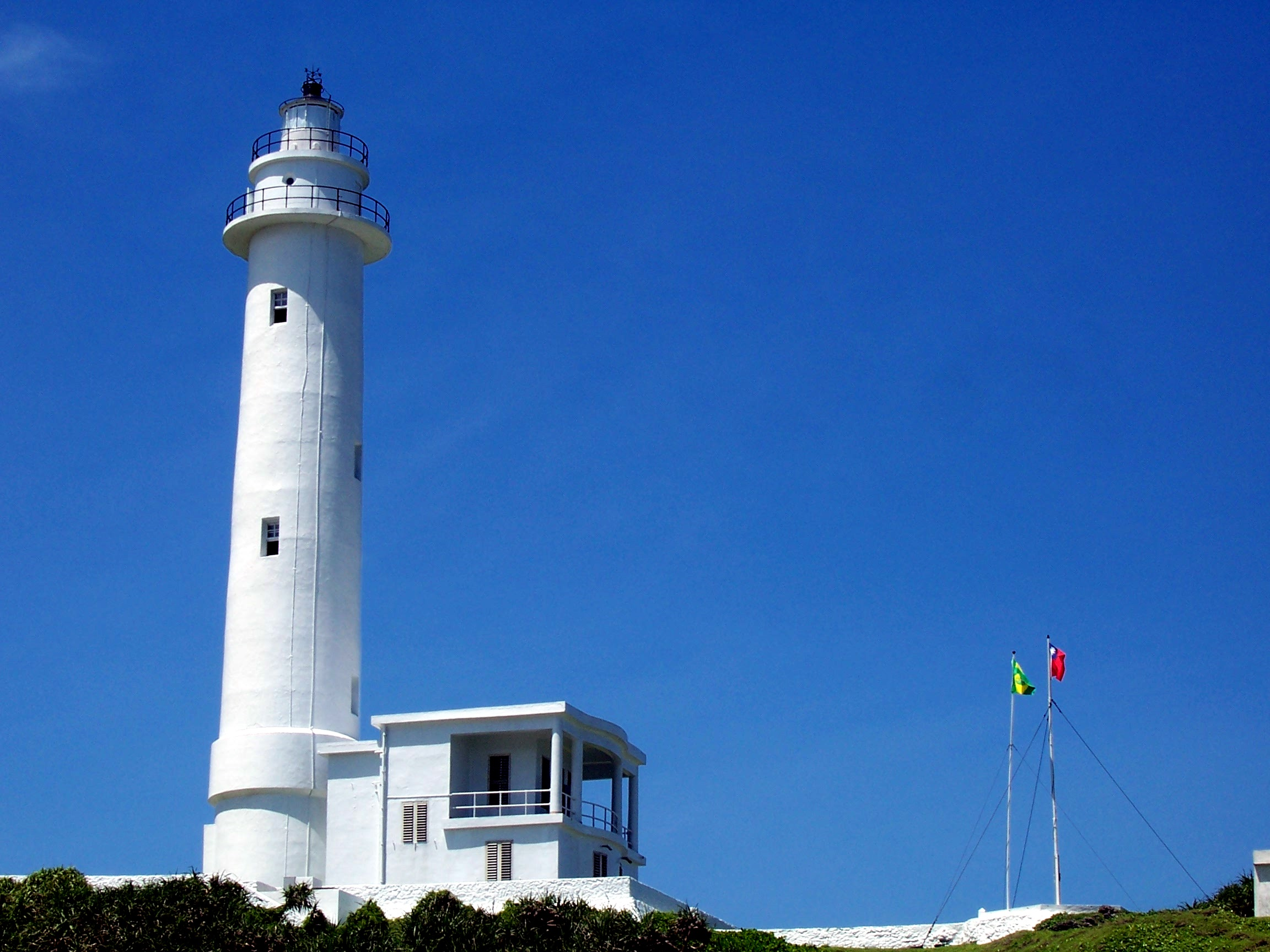
Lyudao Lighthouse

- Su'ao Lighthouse (Chinese: 蘇澳燈塔) (Su-ao Township, Yilan County) 24°36′N 121°53′E
- Cilaibi Lighthouse (Chinese: 奇萊鼻燈塔) (Hualien City, Hualien County) 24°01′N 121°38′E
- Hualien Port Lighthouse (Chinese: 花蓮港燈塔) (Hualien City, Hualien County) 23°59′N 121°36′E
- Lyudao Lighthouse (Chinese: 綠島燈塔) (Green Island, Taitung County) 22°41′N 121°28′E
- Lanyu Lighthouse (Chinese: 蘭嶼燈塔) (Orchid Island, Taitung County) 22°05′N 121°30′E

== Penghu ==
- Mudouyu Lighthouse (Chinese: 目斗嶼燈塔) (Mudou Islet) 23°47′N 119°36′E
- Yuwengdao Lighthouse (Chinese: 漁翁島燈塔) (Yuweng Island, Penghu County) 23°34′N 119°28′E
- Huayu Lighthouse (Chinese: 花嶼燈塔) (Hua Islet, Penghu County) 23°24′N 119°19′E
- Chamu Island Lighthouse (Chinese: 查母嶼燈塔) (Chamu Islet, Penghu County) 23°32′N 119°43′E
- Dongji Island Lighthouse (Chinese: 東吉嶼燈塔) (Dongji Island, Penghu County) 23°16′N 119°40′E
- Qimei Lighthouse (Chinese: 七美嶼燈塔) (Cimei Islet, Penghu County) 23°11′N 119°25′E

== Kinmen ==
- Wuqiu Lighthouse (Chinese: 烏坵嶼燈塔) (Wuqiu (Ockseu, Wuchiu)) 25°00′N 119°27′E
- Beiding Island Lighthouse (Chinese: 北椗島燈塔) (Beiding Island) 24°26′N 118°30′E
- Dongding Island Lighthouse (Chinese: 東椗島燈塔) (Dongding Island) 24°10′N 118°14′E

== Matsu (Lienchiang County) ==
- Dongyong Lighthouse (Chinese: 東湧燈塔) (Dongyin Island) 26°23′N 120°30′E
- Dongquan Lighthouse (Chinese: 東犬燈塔) (Dongjyu Island) 25°58′N 119°59′E

== Pratas and Spratlys ==
- Tai-ping Island Lighthouse
- Tung-sha Island Lighthouse (to be reestablished)

== See also ==
- Lists of lighthouses and lightvessels
