= Pokua =

Kind of folk song style in Taiwan and Penghu

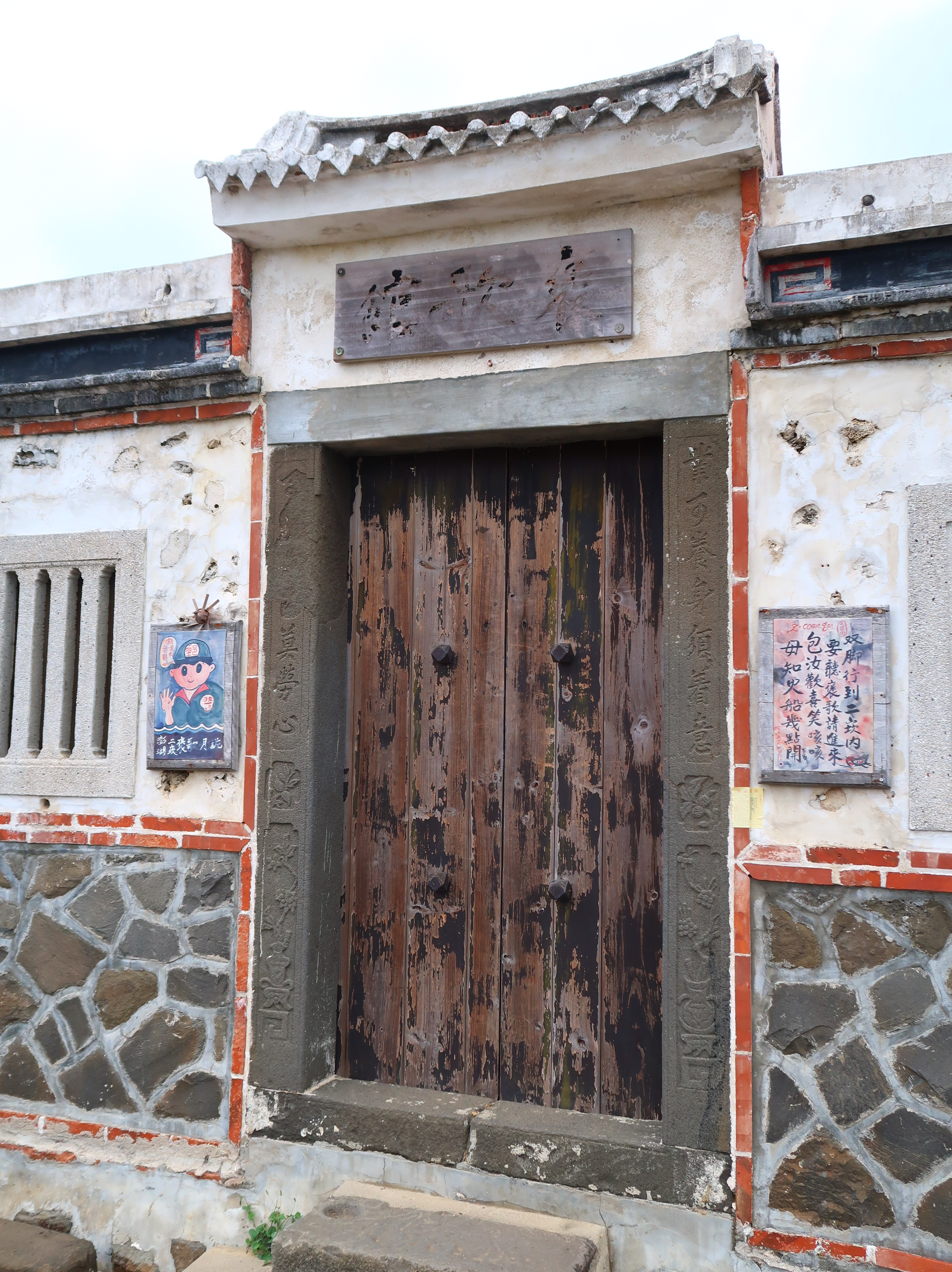
The Pokua Museum at Erkan Village in Siyu Township, Penghu County, Taiwan.

Pokua (Chinese: 褒歌; pinyin: bāo-gē; Pe̍h-ōe-jī: po-koa), also Tshit-jī-á kua (Chinese: 七字仔歌; lit. 'Song of 7 characters'), is a kind of traditional folk music in Taiwan and Penghu which can be traced from Hokkien peoples that migrated to Taiwan under Qing rule. The main themes found in Pokua songs include elements of romance, weather, the environment, festival activities and events of everyday life. Pokua has no fixed process of performance; people are able to sing Pokua with improvised lyrics or rhythms.

== Name ==
Pokua means "Song of Compliment" or "Song of Praise". Some people also refer to the tradition as "Tshit-jī-á kua'' (song of 7 characters) based on its lyrical form.

== Introduction ==
Pokua can be defined as a folk song tradition. Traditional oral music performance in Taiwan was continuously popular throughout history, especially among commoners. In the basic form of Pokua, there are usually at least 4 lines in a song, with seven Chinese characters in each line. There is usually has an end-rhyme on the last syllable in each line. There is no rigid ristriction on the number of characters, lines, or rhymes that can appear in any song, but four lines to a song with seven characters to a line is the most common Taiwanese style of Pokua.

=== Example ===
Example Pokua Form
Chinese characters	Taiwanese pronunciation	English translation	Main idea of narration	Note
天頂出有講百萬	Thinn-tíng tshut ū kóng pah-bān	There were a million fortunes in heaven.	Landscape	
地下出有媠牡丹	Tuē-hā tshut ū suí bóo-tan	There was a beautiful peony on the ground.	Landscape	Peony is the king of flowers in Chinese culture, as well as a symbol of wealth.
阿娘生媠好人範	A-niû sinn suí hó lâng-pān	Beautiful girl, a model of grace.	Emotion	
親像仙女來下凡	Tshin-tshiūnn sian-lú lâi hā-huān	Like an angel coming down to earth.	Emotion	
