= Xiyu =

Xiyu or Hsi-yü can refer to:

- Xiyu, Penghu, an island and township in Taiwan
- Western Regions, Xīyù (西域) in Chinese, a historical name for parts of Central Asia
