= Lanyu Lighthouse =

Lighthouse in Lanyu, Taitung County, Taiwan

Lanyu Lighthouse 蘭嶼燈塔
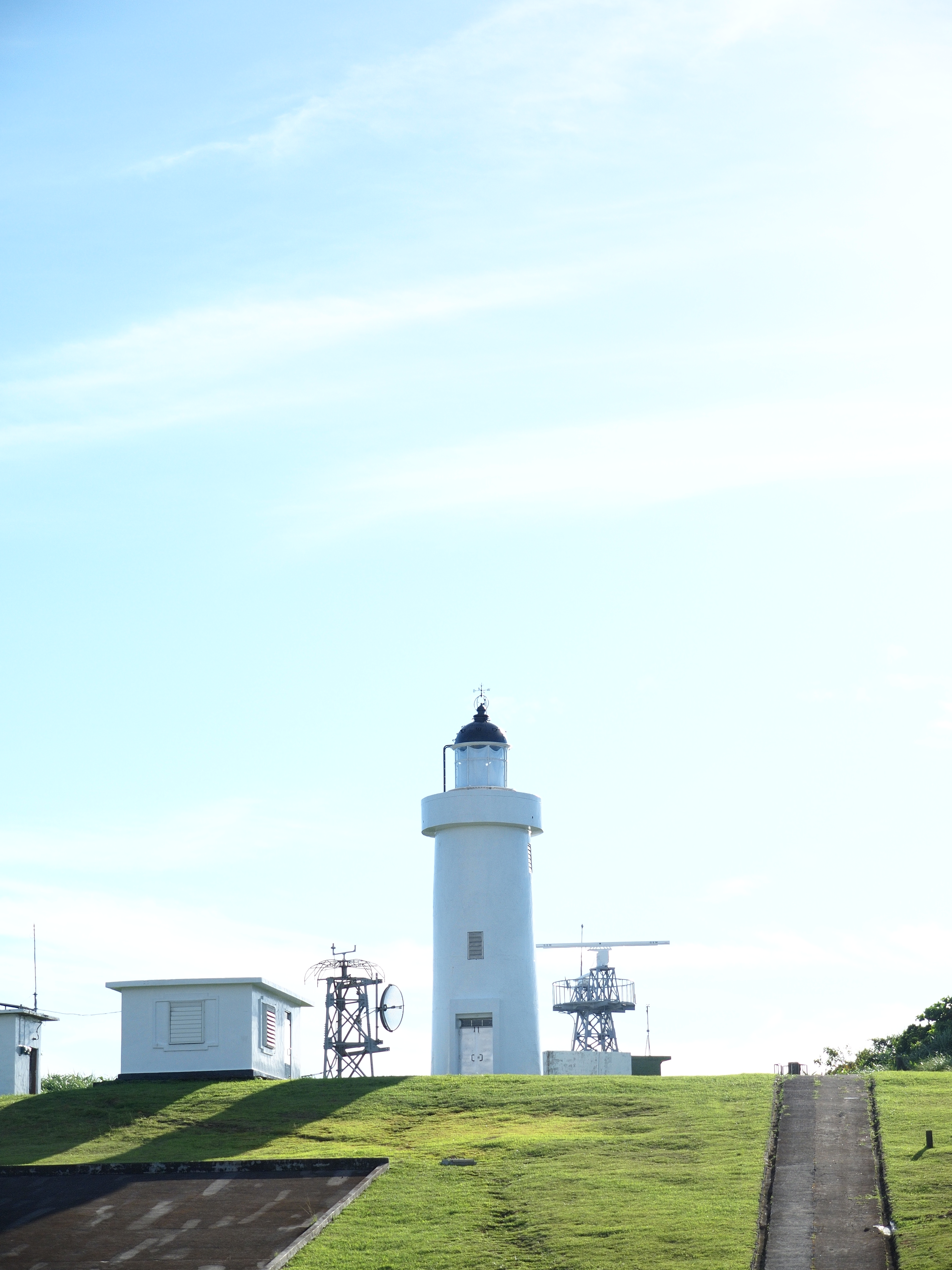
- Location: Orchid Island, Lanyu Township, Taiwan
- Coordinates: 22°04′52″N 121°30′11″E

Tower
- Constructed: 1982
- Construction: concrete (tower)
- Height: 14.8 m (49 ft)
- Shape: cylinder (tower)
- Markings: White (tower, lantern), black (dome)
- Operator: Maritime and Port Bureau

Light
- Focal height: 216.5 m (710 ft)
- Range: 26.1 nmi (48.3 km; 30.0 mi)
- Characteristic: Fl(4) W 24s

The Lanyu Lighthouse (traditional Chinese: 蘭嶼燈塔; simplified Chinese: 兰屿灯塔; pinyin: Lányǔ Dēngtǎ) is a lighthouse in Orchid Island, Taitung County, Taiwan.

== History ==
The lighthouse was built in 1982.

== Architecture ==
The lighthouse emits four white flashes every 24 seconds with a luminous intensity of 1.2 million candlepower and nominal range of 25.1 nautical miles. This concrete lighthouse tower stands at 15 meters with lantern and gallery. It is painted in white for its all and black for its dome.

== See also ==
- List of lighthouses in Taiwan
- List of tourist attractions in Taiwan
