= Wanggong Fishing Port =

Fishing port in Fangyuan, Taiwan

Wanggong Fishing Port 王功漁港
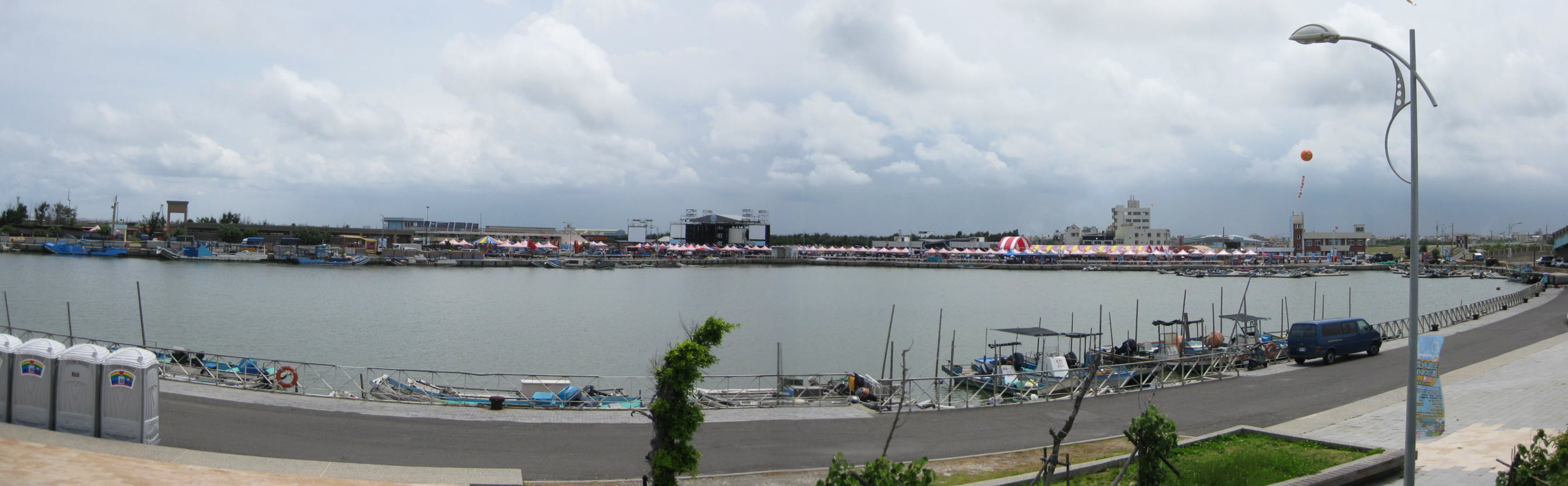
- Interactive map of Wanggong Fishing Port 王功漁港

Location
- Location: Fangyuan, Changhua County, Taiwan
- Coordinates: 23°58′09.1″N 120°19′27.5″E

Details
- Opened: 1969
- Type of harbour: fishing port

The Wanggong Fishing Port (traditional Chinese: 王功漁港; simplified Chinese: 王功渔港; pinyin: Wánggōng Yúgǎng) is a fishing port in Wanggong Village, Fangyuan Township, Changhua County, Taiwan.

== History ==
The construction of the port was originally completed in 1969 and was transformed into a recreational fishing port in 2000. In 2002, the Changhua County Government undertook the port re-engineering program to renew the area in order to attract more visitors to the port.

== Features ==
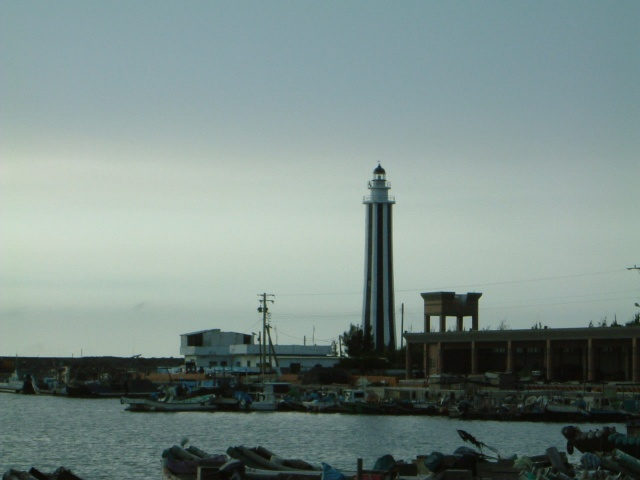
The Fangyuan Lighthouse located nearby the port.

The port includes the fish product direct retail center, visitor center, fresh produce and seafood specialty products retail platform, ecological observation platform, dike viewing plank road and pavilion, waterfront performance plaza, parking lots, harbor area lighting, grass lawns, windbreak trails, restrooms and landscaping next to the access road. The Fangyuan Lighthouse was built nearby the port to navigate the ships coming in and out from the harbor.

== Transportation ==
The port is accessible by bus from Changhua Station of the Taiwan Railway.

== See also ==
- Transportation in Taiwan
