= Fangyuan Lighthouse =

Lighthouse in Fangyuan, Changhua County, Taiwan

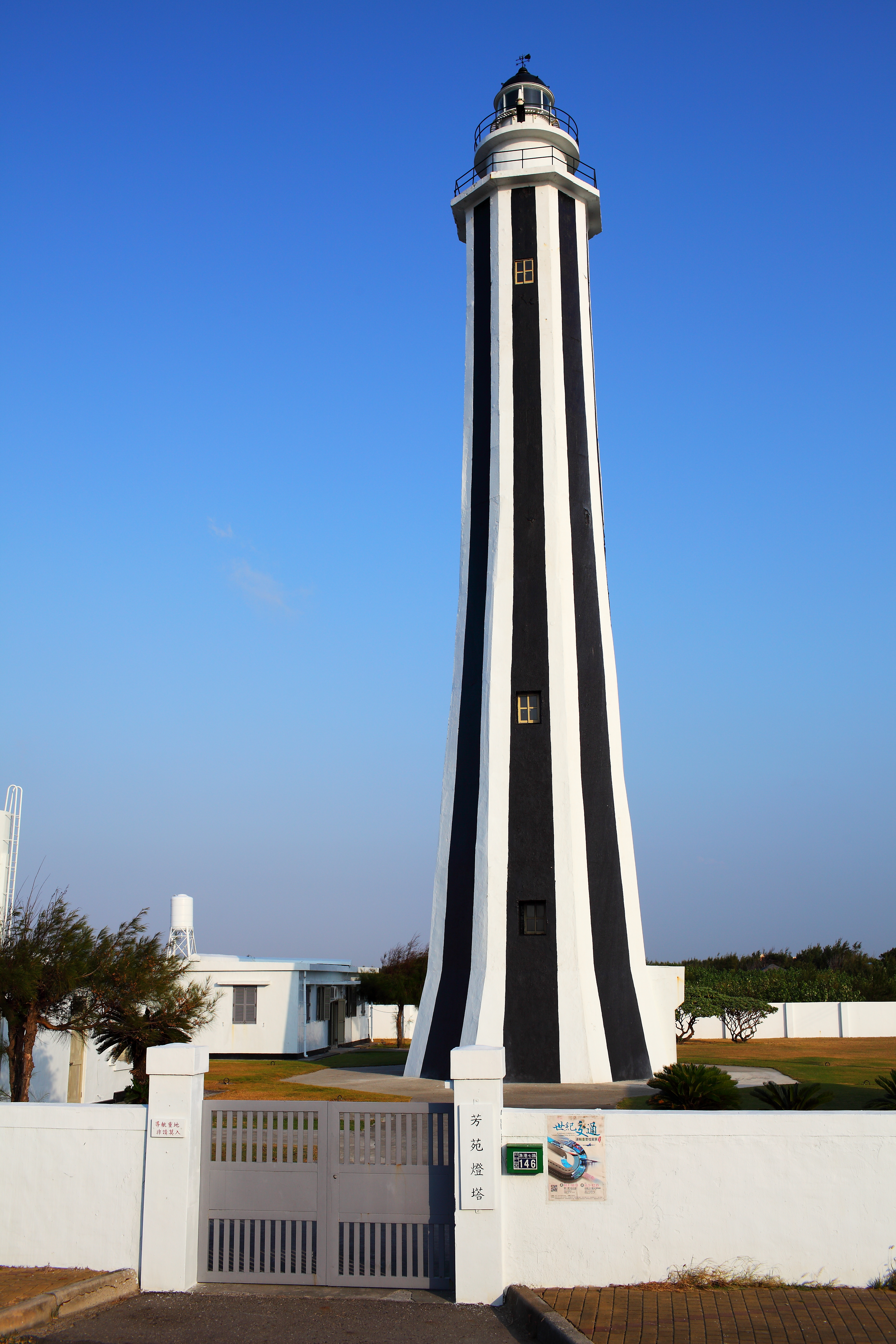
- Fangyuan Lighthouse
- Location: Fangyuan, Changhua County, Taiwan
- Coordinates: 23°58′16.1″N 120°19′27.0″E

Tower
- Constructed: 1983
- Foundation: concrete base
- Construction: concrete tower
- Height: 37.4 metres (123 ft)
- Shape: tapered octagonal prism with double balcony and lantern
- Markings: tower with black and white vertical stripes, white lantern, black lantern dome
- Power source: mains electricity
- Operator: Maritime and Port Bureau

Light
- Focal height: 35.7 metres (117 ft)
- Intensity: 28,000 candelas
- Range: 16.6 nautical miles (30.7 km; 19.1 mi)
- Characteristic: Iso W 10s.

The Fangyuan Lighthouse (Chinese: 芳苑燈塔; pinyin: Fāngyuàn Dēngtǎ) is a lighthouse in Fangyuan Township, Changhua County, Taiwan.

== History ==
The lighthouse was built in 1983 at the eastern side of Wanggong Fishing Port to ensure the safety of vessels moving around the port.

== Architecture ==
The octagonal lighthouse is painted in black and white vertical bands and stands up to 35.7 meters. The tower was constructed with reinforced concrete and equipped with fourth class electric lamp, which generated 28,000 candlepower light for as far as 16.6 nautical miles. It was built with a power generation room, store room and dorms.

== Technical specifications ==
The light beam from the lighthouse is five seconds light, then five seconds dark...

== See also ==
- List of lighthouses in Taiwan
- List of tourist attractions in Taiwan
