= Kaohsiung Lighthouse =

Lighthouse in Qijin, Kaohsiung, Taiwan

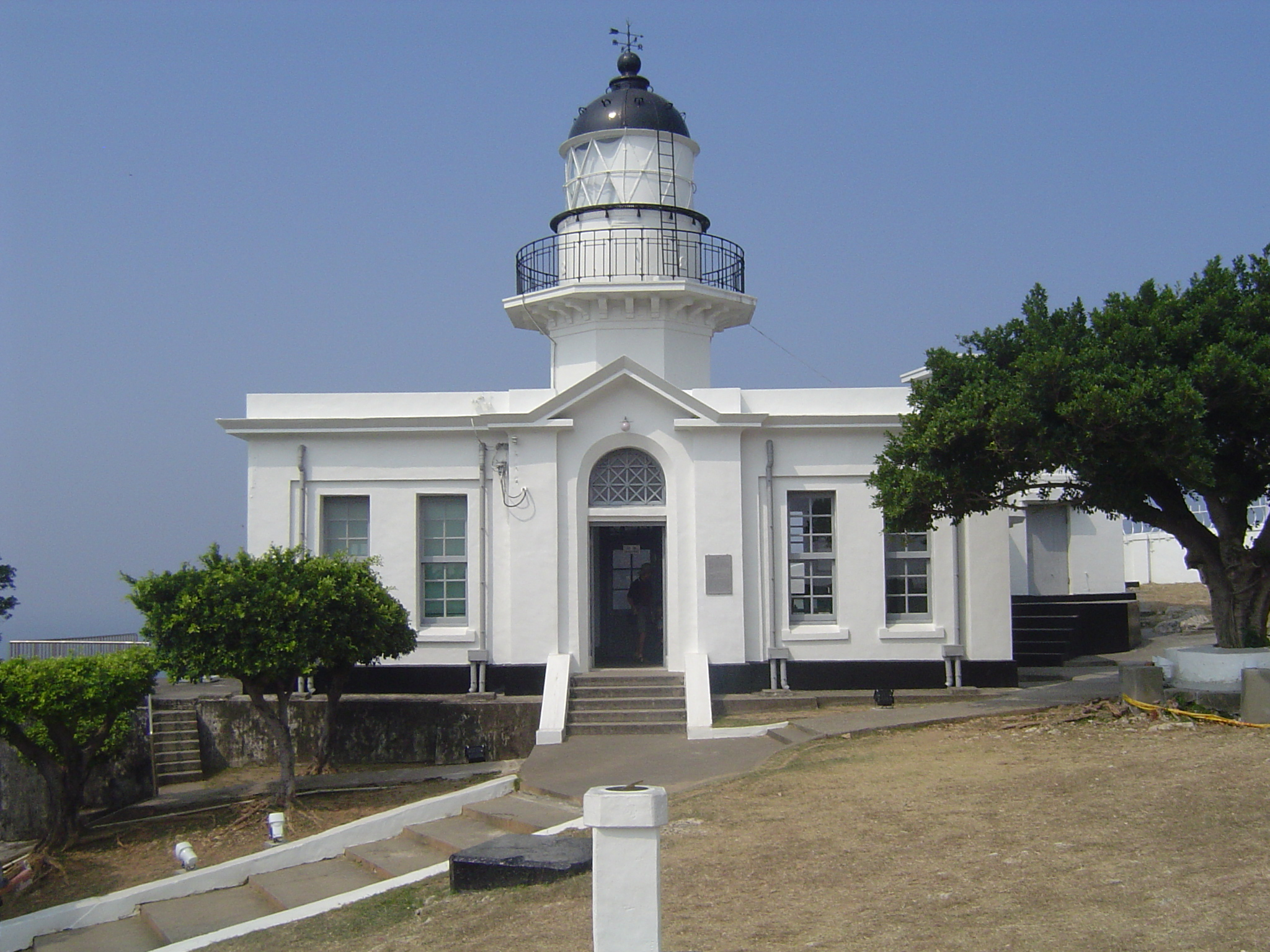
- Location: Cijin, Kaohsiung, Taiwan
- Coordinates: 22.615417°N 120.264944°E

Tower
- Constructed: 1883
- Construction: masonry tower
- Height: 15.2 metres (50 ft)
- Shape: octagonal tower with balcony and lantern
- Markings: white tower, black lantern dome and rail
- Power source: mains electricity
- Operator: Maritime and Port Bureau
- Heritage: historic site

Light
- First lit: 1918 (restored)
- Focal height: 58.2 metres (191 ft)
- Intensity: 850,000 candela
- Range: 25.2 nautical miles (46.7 km; 29.0 mi)
- Characteristic: Fl (4) W 30s.

The Kaohsiung Lighthouse (traditional Chinese: 高雄燈塔; simplified Chinese: 高雄灯塔; pinyin: Gāoxióng Dēngtǎ; Wade–Giles: Kao¹-hsiung² Têng¹-tʻa³), also called Cihou Lighthouse (Chinese: 旗後燈塔; Hanyu Pinyin: Qíhòu Dēngtǎ; Tongyong Pinyin: Cíhòu Dengtǎ) or Cijin Lighthouse (Chinese: 旗津燈塔; Hanyu Pinyin: Qíjīn Dēngtǎ; Tongyong Pinyin: Cíjin Dengtǎ), is a lighthouse in Cijin District, Kaohsiung, Taiwan.

== History ==
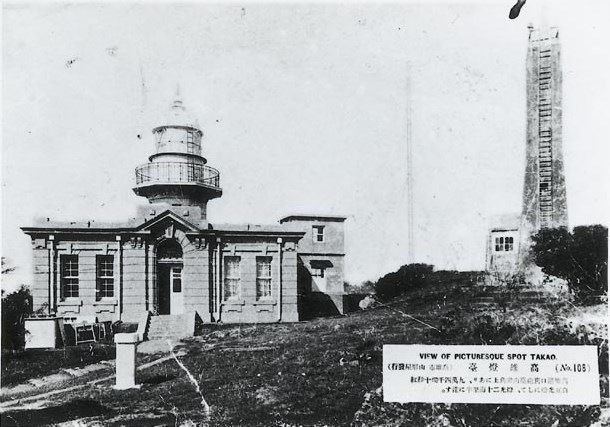
Old image of Kaohsiung Lighthouse

After the signing of Convention of Peking in 1860 during the Qing Dynasty rule, the Takau Harbor was opened to foreign traders in 1863. With increasing commercial shipping activities and a lack of a proper ship navigation system, the British engineers built a Chinese-style rectangular red-brick lighthouse at the top of Mount Ki-au (旗後山), at the southern side of the harbor.

During the Japanese rule, in line with the expansion of the harbor, the lighthouse was rebuilt in 1916 as part of the project. It underwent renovation in 1918 to what it looks like today. The base of the lighthouse building was rebuilt in Baroque style.

In 1985, the lighthouse was designated a Historical Building and subsequently opened to the public.

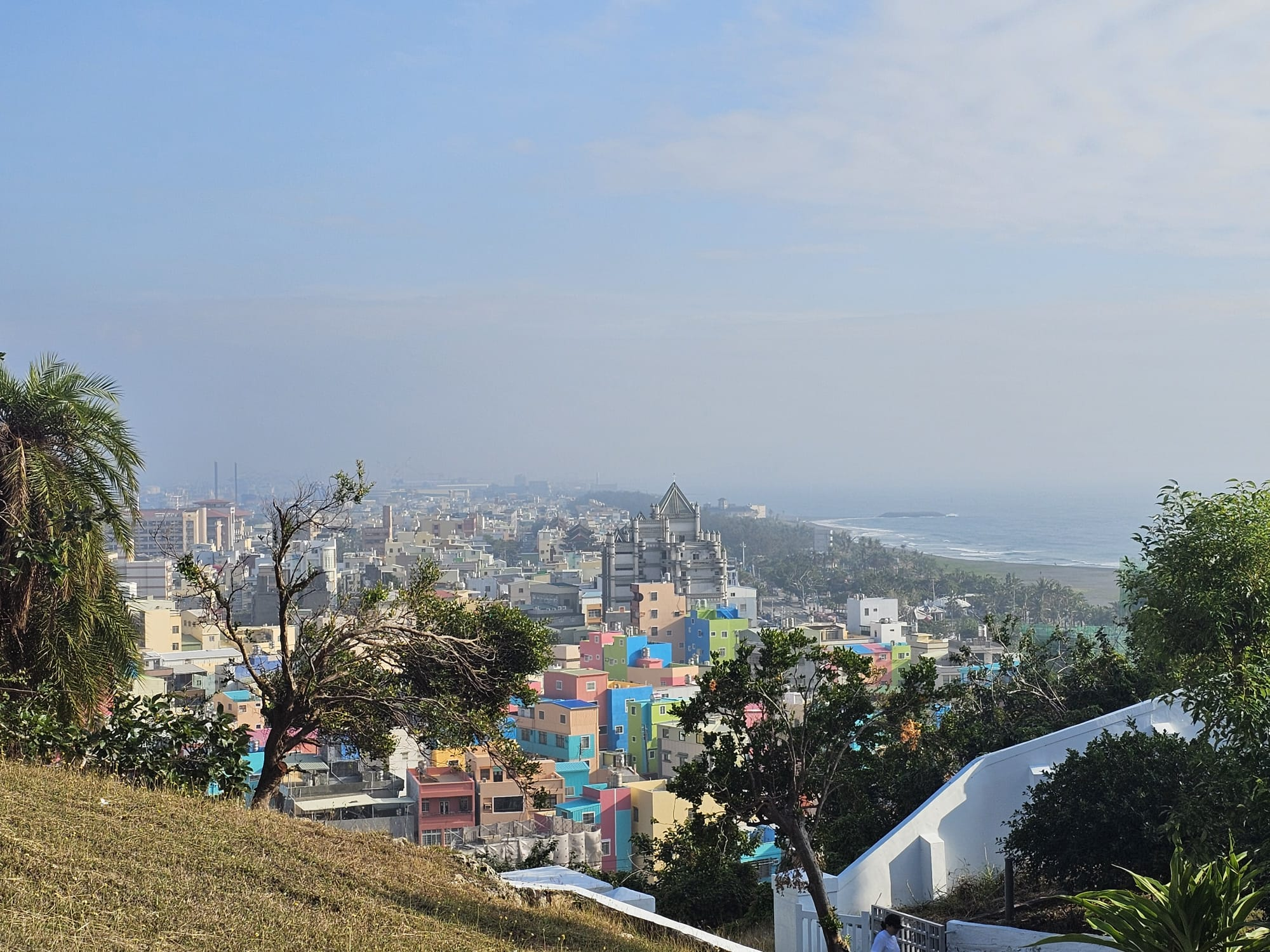
View of Cijin Island from the lighthouse

== Features ==
The lighthouse tower provides an excellent view of the entire Port of Kaohsiung.

A cafe operates from one of the historic buildings adjacent to the lighthouse.

== See also ==
- List of tourist attractions in Taiwan
- List of lighthouses in Taiwan
