= Xiyu Western Fort =

Former fort in Xiyu, Penghu, Taiwan

- 西嶼西臺
- Xiyu, Penghu, Taiwan
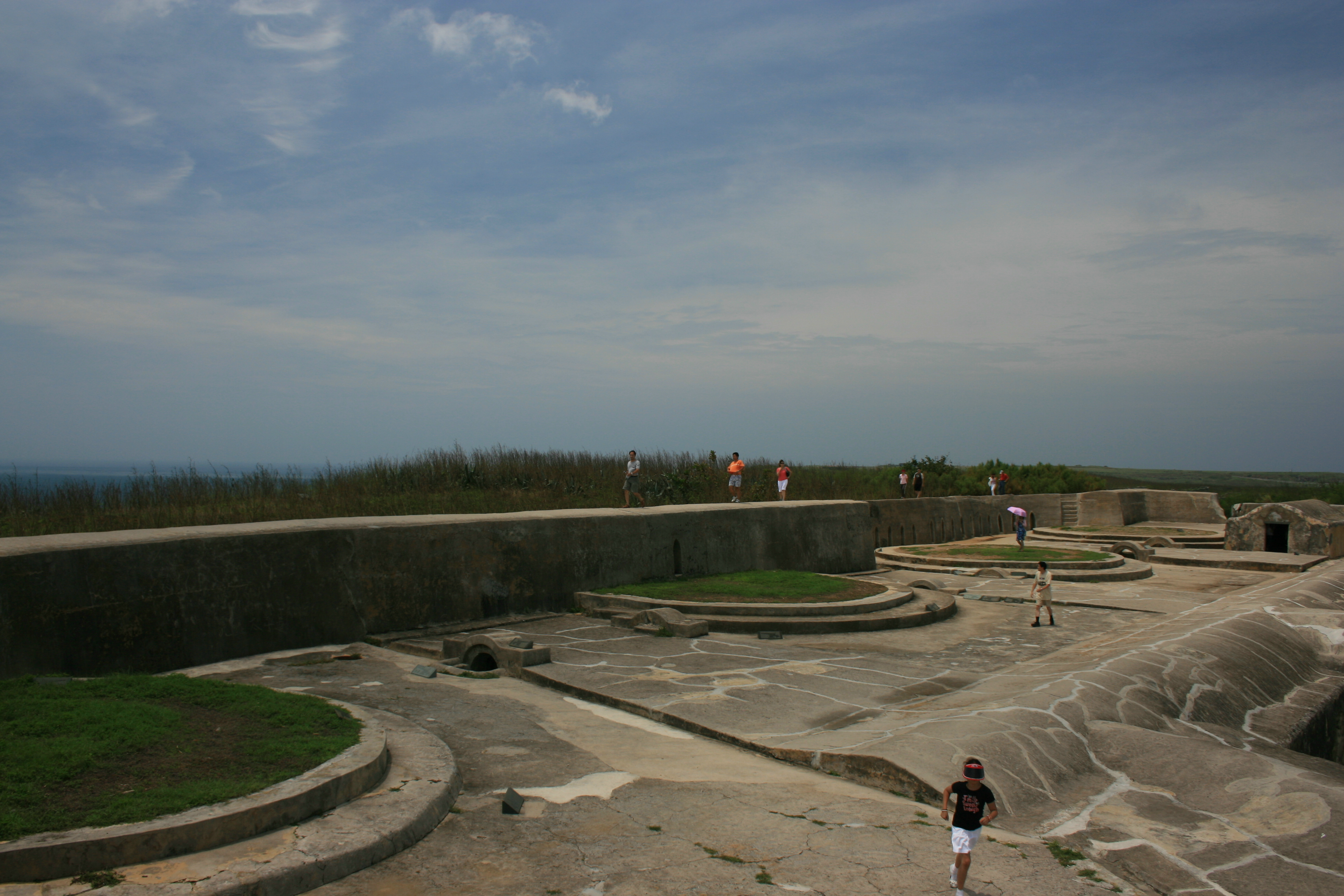

Site information
- Type: fort

Location
- Taiwan
- Coordinates: 23°33′51.1″N 119°29′23.0″E

The Xiyu Western Fort (Chinese: 西嶼西臺; pinyin: Xīyǔ Xītái) or Xiyu Western Battery (西嶼西砲臺 Xīyǔ Xī Pàotái, informally 西台古堡 Xītái Gǔbǎo) is a former fort and battery in Wai'an Village, Xiyu Township, Penghu, Taiwan.

== History ==
In the 17th century, Chinese Ming Dynasty loyalist general Chen Guoxuan (陳國軒) built 15 batteries in Penghu to guard against Qing dynasty admiral Shi Lang. Many of the batteries were destroyed during the Sino-French War of 1884 and 1885, when Penghu was one of the main theaters of conflict. Following the war, Qing governor of Taiwan Liu Mingchuan built four batteries in Penghu in 1887, including the Xiyu Western Battery. The battery was inscribed by Li Hongzhang. Xiyu Western Fort was important in delaying Japanese attacks during the Japanese invasion of Taiwan in 1895 but was abandoned during Japanese rule.

It was designated a class-one historic relic in 1983 and, after a four-year renovation, was opened to the public in 1990. The Penghu County government purchased three British-made Armstrong guns for the fort in 2008 for NT$20 million and they were installed in 2011.

== Architecture ==
The fort was constructed on basalt terrain and has the same height to the surrounding ground. It is fully surrounded by solid walls in all directions and has four cannons inside. There are many arches stretching to all directions.

== See also ==
- List of tourist attractions in Taiwan
