= Yuwengdao Lighthouse =

Lighthouse in Xiyu, Penghu, Taiwan

Yuwengdao Lighthouse 漁翁島燈塔
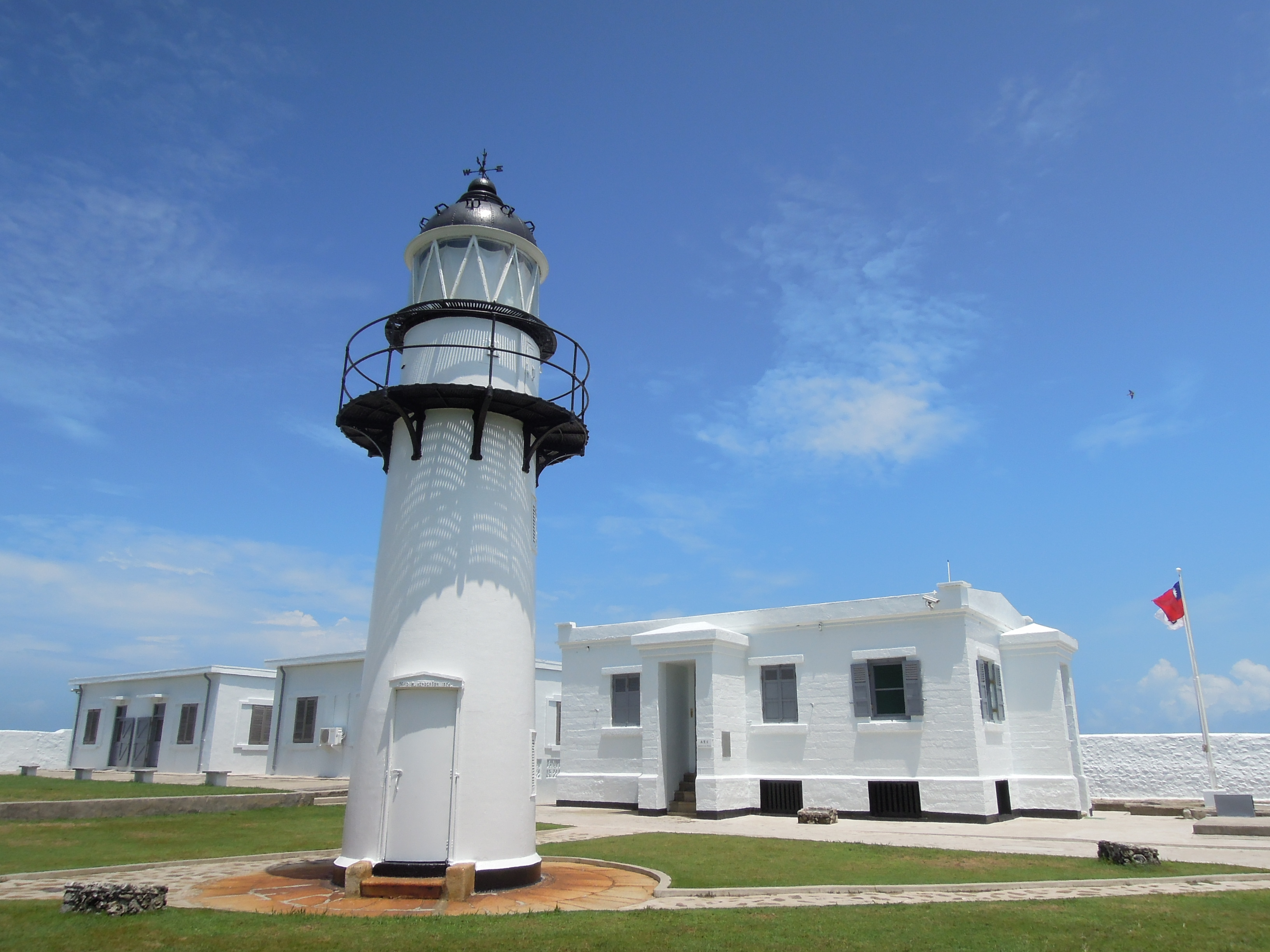
- Location: Wai'an Village, Xiyu, Penghu, Taiwan
- Coordinates: 23.562547°N 119.469020°E

Tower
- Constructed: 1778 (first); 1828 (second)
- Construction: Cast iron tower
- Height: 11 metres (36 ft)
- Shape: Cylindrical tower with balcony and lantern
- Markings: White tower, black lantern dome
- Power source: mains electricity
- Operator: Maritime and Port Bureau

Light
- First lit: 1875 (current)
- Focal height: 60.7 metres (199 ft)
- Range: 25.1 nautical miles (46.5 km; 28.9 mi)
- Characteristic: L Fl (2) W 30s.

The Yuwengdao Lighthouse or Yuwongdao Lighthouse, Fisher Island Lighthouse, Yuweng Tao Lighthouse, Yu-Won Island Lighthouse, West Island Lighthouse and Xiyu Lighthouse (traditional Chinese: 漁翁島燈塔; simplified Chinese: 渔翁岛灯塔; pinyin: Yúwēng Dǎo Dēngtǎ) is a lighthouse in Wai'an Village, Xiyu Township, Penghu County, Taiwan. The Yuwengdao Lighthouse is the oldest lighthouse in Taiwan.

== History ==
The Yuwengdao Lighthouse was built by British engineer, David Marr Henderson, in 1875 on the site of the earlier "Xiyu Pagoda Lighthouse" (Chinese: 西嶼塔燈; pinyin: Xīyǔ tǎdēng), which was originally built in 1778 during the Qianlong Emperor reign of Taiwan. The earlier Xiyu Pagoda Lighthouse structure was a stone tower with an oil lamp light source, and is mentioned on a stone stele that still stands within the grounds of the Yuwengdao Lighthouse. Originally having black exterior, the Yuwengdao Lighthouse was repainted white in 1915. The site was opened to the public in 1992.

== Architecture ==
The lighthouse is built of cast iron painted white and stands at a height of 11 meters.

== Documentary ==
The Yuwengdao Lighthouse was the focus of the short documentary film, The Coastwise Lights of Penghu : The Fisher Island (Yuwengdao) Lighthouse 燈塔記憶 : 澎湖漁翁島燈塔, published in 2017 by the City University of Hong Kong (CityU).

== See also ==
- List of tourist attractions in Taiwan
- List of lighthouses in Taiwan
