= Fuhai Temple =

Temple in Changhua County, Taiwan

- 福海宮
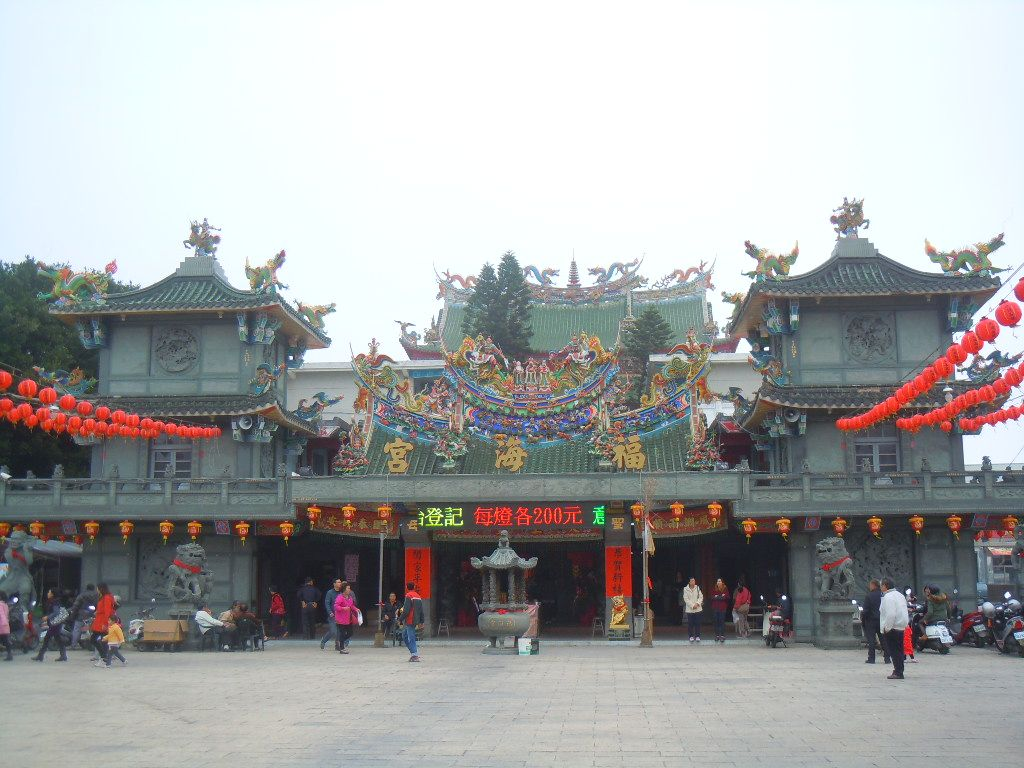
- Exterior of the temple

Religion
- Affiliation: Taoism
- Deity: Mazu

Location
- Location: Fangyuan, Changhua County
- Country: Taiwan
- Interactive map of Fuhai Temple
- Coordinates: 23.9532°N 120.3347°E

Architecture
- Completed: 1812
- Direction of façade: West

Wanggong Fuhai Temple (Chinese: 王功福海宮; pinyin: Wánggōng Fúhǎi Gōng) is a temple located in Wanggong, Fangyuan Township, Changhua County, Taiwan. The temple is dedicated to the sea goddess Mazu.

== History ==
Like most coastal villages, Wanggong had a small temple dedicated to Mazu to pray for the protection of its fishermen. In 1812, Yang Gui-sen, a Qing Dynasty official serving as the Changhua County magistrate, visited Changhua County's coast. When Yang reached Wanggong, he noticed that Wanggong sits in a place with good feng shui and called for a larger Mazu temple to be built, hence the origin of Fuhai Temple. When Yang was returning to mainland China, only the main hall of Fuhai Temple was completed; Yang instructed that any further construction must be overseen by another government official. In honor of Yang, Fuhai Temple was left untouched, and fell into disrepair.

In 1958, Wanggong residents petitioned for Changhua County's governor Chen Xi-qing to refurbish the temple, which he agreed and attended the groundbreaking ceremony. According to legend, immediately after the ceremony, Wanggong's milkfish production unexpectedly surged. The villagers believed that Mazu had blessed the town and donated money into Fuhai Temple's reconstruction, and the project was completed in a year.

== Architecture ==
Fuhai Temple is divided into a main hall and a rear hall. Mazu is seated in the main hall accompanied by her guardians Qianliyan and Shunfeng'er. The rear hall is three-stories tall that includes altars for Guanyin, the Eighteen Arhats, and the Jade Emperor, as well as lodging for visiting pilgrims.

== Traditions ==
Fuhai Temple's celebrates the annual Wanggong Fireworks Festival (王功漁火節), which is the biggest event of the year in Wanggong. The festival's dates are determined by Mazu through poe divination in the temple, and the temple grounds is one of the host sites for various events throughout the festival.
