= Mudouyu Lighthouse =

Lighthouse in Baisha, Penghu, Taiwan

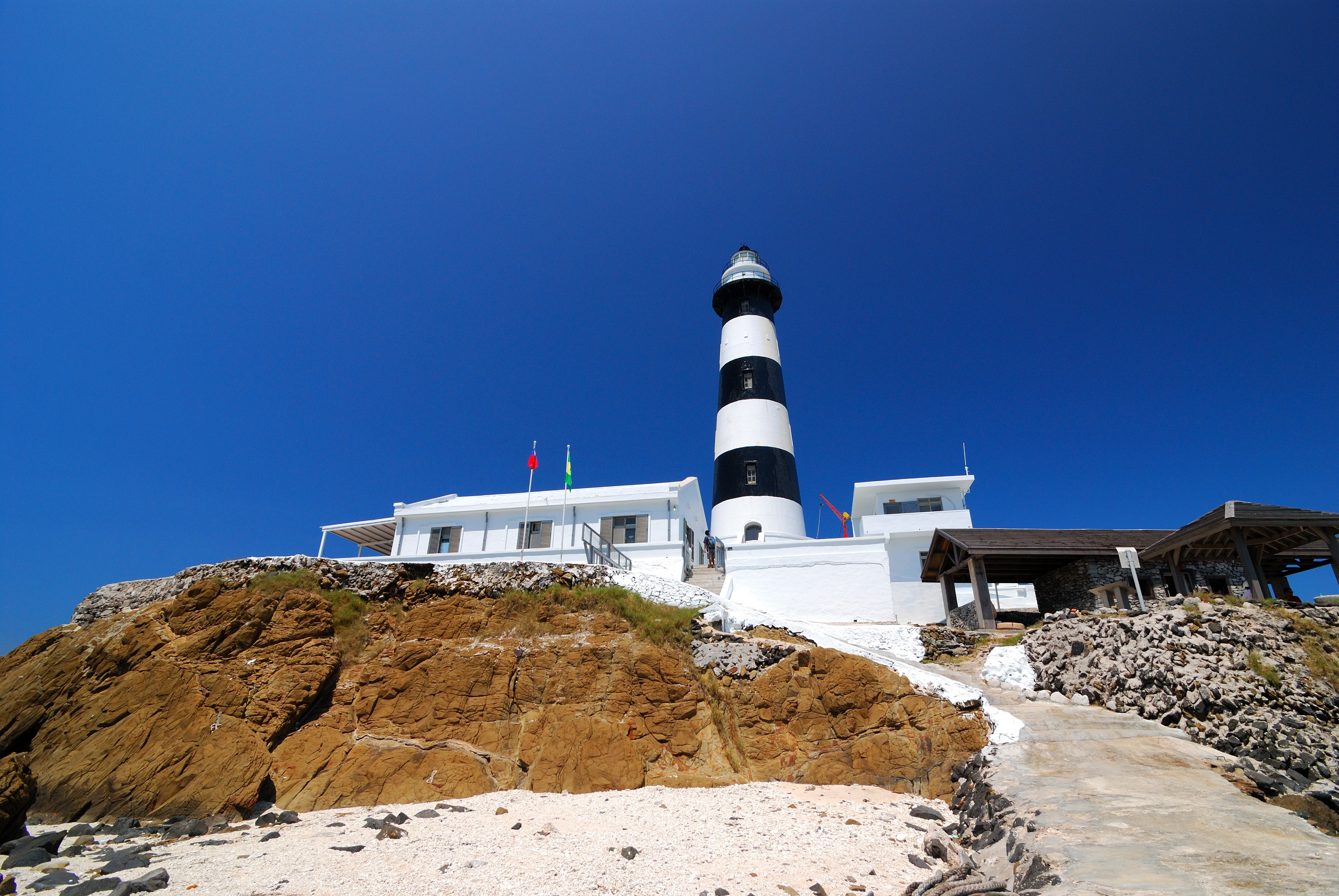
- Location: Mudou Island; Baisha; Penghu; Taiwan
- Coordinates: 23°47′10.9″N 119°36′01.7″E

Tower
- Constructed: 1902
- Construction: cast iron tower
- Height: 39.9 metres (131 ft)
- Shape: tapered cylindrical tower with double balcony and lantern
- Markings: tower with black and white bands
- Operator: Penghu National Scenic Area

Light
- Focal height: 49 metres (161 ft)
- Range: 26.8 nautical miles (49.6 km; 30.8 mi)

The Mudouyu Lighthouse (traditional Chinese: 目斗嶼燈塔; simplified Chinese: 目斗屿灯塔; pinyin: Mùdòuyǔ Dēngtǎ) is a lighthouse on Mudou Island, Baisha Township, Penghu County, Taiwan.

== History ==
The lighthouse is the first lighthouse built in Taiwan under Japanese rule.

== Architecture ==
The lighthouse was built with strong cast iron to avoid the strong wind and waves eroding away the building. The exterior of the lighthouse is painted in black and white stripes. It stands 39.9 meters tall, making it the tallest lighthouse in Taiwan.

== Energy ==
The lighthouse has a water collecting facility to collect rainfall from its rooftop. The lighthouse is powered by three generators due to the absence of a power plant on Mudou Island.

== See also ==
- List of lighthouses in Taiwan
- List of tourist attractions in Taiwan
