= Lüdao Lighthouse =

Lighthouse on Green Island (Ludao), Taitung County, Taiwan

Lyudao Lighthouse
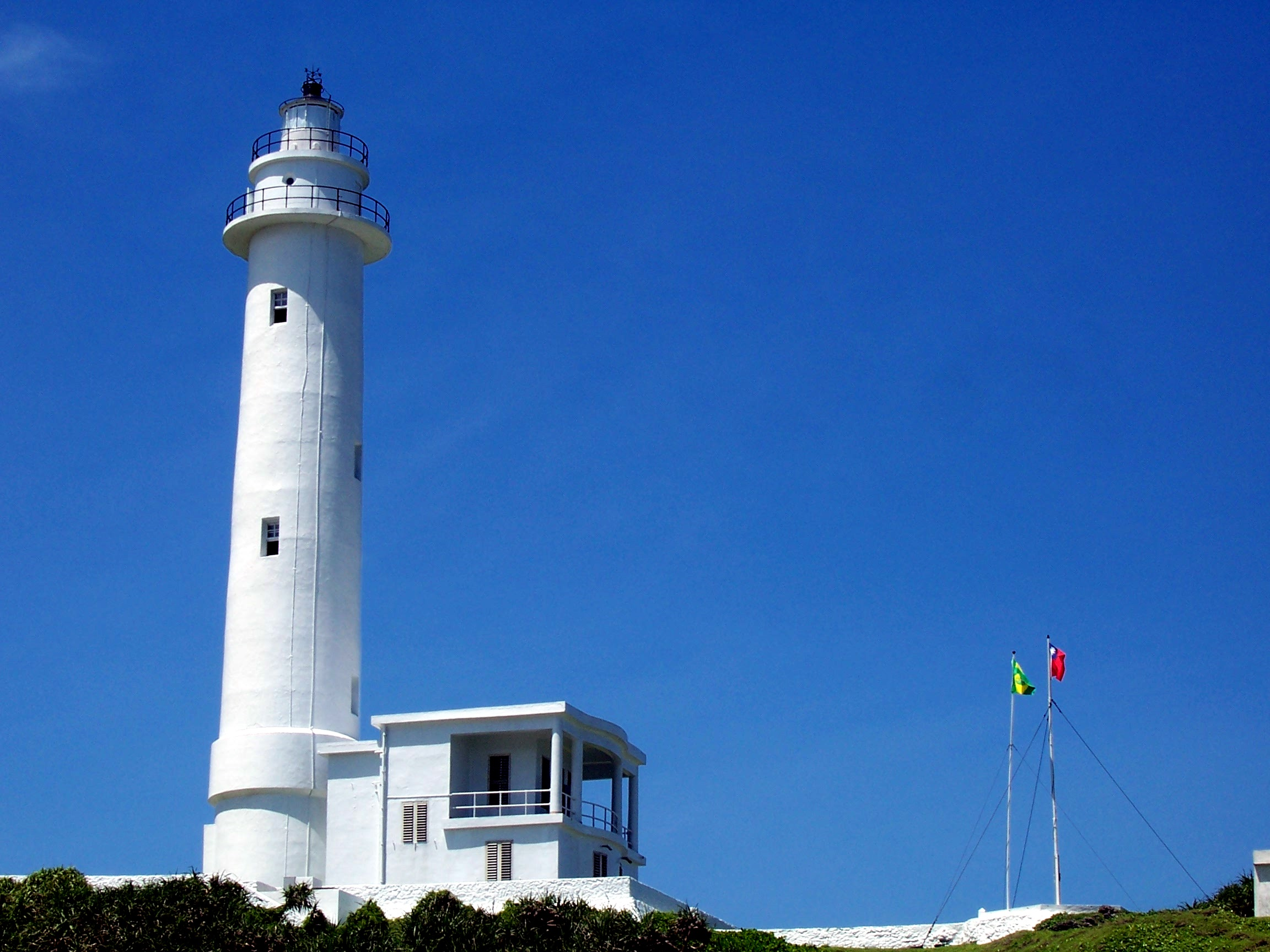
- Location: Green Island, Zhongliao Village, Taiwan
- Coordinates: 22°40′37″N 121°27′58″E

Tower
- Constructed: 1939
- Construction: concrete (tower)
- Height: 33.3 m (109 ft)
- Shape: cylindrical tower with balcony and lantern
- Markings: white (tower, lantern), black (roof)
- Operator: Maritime and Port Bureau

Light
- First lit: 1949
- Focal height: 48.2 m (158 ft)
- Range: 25.7 nmi (47.6 km; 29.6 mi)
- Characteristic: Fl(2) W 20s

The Green Island Lighthouse (traditional Chinese: 綠島燈塔; simplified Chinese: 绿岛灯塔; pinyin: Lǜdǎo Dēngtǎ; Pe̍h-ōe-jī: Le̍k-tó Teng-thah) is a lighthouse in Cape Bitoujiao, Green Island, Taitung County, Taiwan.

== History ==
The lighthouse was built and went into operation in 1939 after the SS President Hoover hit the island's reef on 11 December 1937 en route from Japan to the Philippines. The construction cost was funded by the American Red Cross as a thanksgiving to the local people who had rescued the passengers of the ship. The lighthouse was destroyed by an air strike during World War II but was rebuilt by the Republic of China government in 1948. Much later on, the lighthouse was opened to the public in September 2013. It has been designated as a historical building in Taitung County.

== Architecture ==
The white lighthouse is 33 meters in height with 150 steps to the top of the tower. It was originally designed by a Japanese engineer.

== See also ==
- List of lighthouses in Taiwan
- SS President Hoover
- List of tourist attractions in Taiwan
