= Chuwan Crab Museum =

Museum in Xiyu, Penghu, Taiwan

- 竹灣螃蟹博物館
- Established: 1 April 2004
- Location: Xiyu, Penghu, Taiwan
- Coordinates: 23°37′58.9″N 119°31′17.8″E
- Type: museum

The Chuwan Crab Museum (traditional Chinese: 竹灣螃蟹博物館; simplified Chinese: 竹湾螃蟹博物馆; pinyin: Zhúwān Pángxiè Bówùguǎn; Wade–Giles: Chu^{2}-wan^{1} Pʻang^{2}-hsieh^{4} Po^{2}-wu^{4}-kuan^{3}) is a museum about crabs in Zhuwan village, Xiyu Township, Penghu County, Taiwan.

The museum was opened on 1 April 2004. It displays various kinds of crabs found around the Penghu Islands.

== See also ==
- List of museums in Taiwan
