= Xiyu Eastern Fort =

Former fort in Xiyu, Penghu, Taiwan

- 西嶼東臺
- Xiyu, Penghu, Taiwan
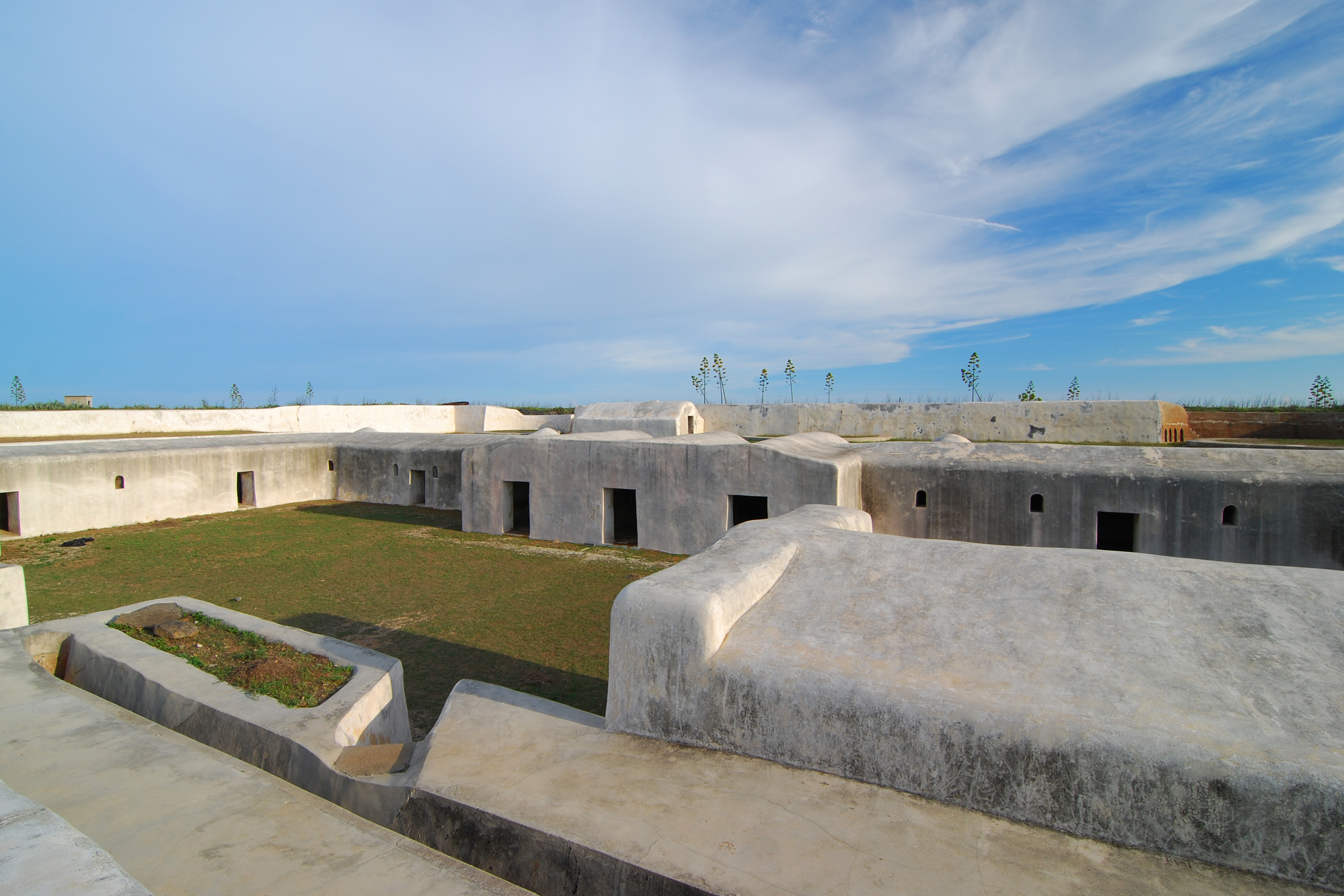

Site information
- Type: fort

Location
- Taiwan
- Coordinates: 23°33′56.3″N 119°30′50.6″E

Site history
- Built: 1889

The Xiyu Eastern Fort (traditional Chinese: 西嶼東臺; simplified Chinese: 西屿东台; pinyin: Xīyǔ Dōngtái) or Xiyu Eastern Battery (西嶼東砲臺 Xīyǔ Dōng Pàotái, informally 東台古堡 Dōngtái Gǔbǎo) is a former fort and battery in Wai'an Village, Xiyu Township, Penghu, Taiwan.

== History ==
In the 17th century, Chinese Ming Dynasty loyalist general Chen Guoxuan (陳國軒) built 15 batteries in Penghu to guard against Qing dynasty admiral Shi Lang. Many of the batteries were destroyed during the Sino-French War of 1884 and 1885, when Penghu was one of the main theaters of conflict. Following the war, Qing governor of Taiwan Liu Mingchuan ordered four batteries built in Penghu in 1887. Xiyu Eastern Fort was constructed in 1889 during Qing Dynasty rule of Taiwan. It was constructed to consolidate the coastal area of Penghu.

== Architecture ==
The fort was built in a U-shape structure facing the sea which spreads over an area of 7 hectares. It was fully constructed by gray building.

== See also ==
- List of tourist attractions in Taiwan
