= Xiaomen Geology Gallery =

Gallery in Xiyu, Penghu, Taiwan

- 小門地質館
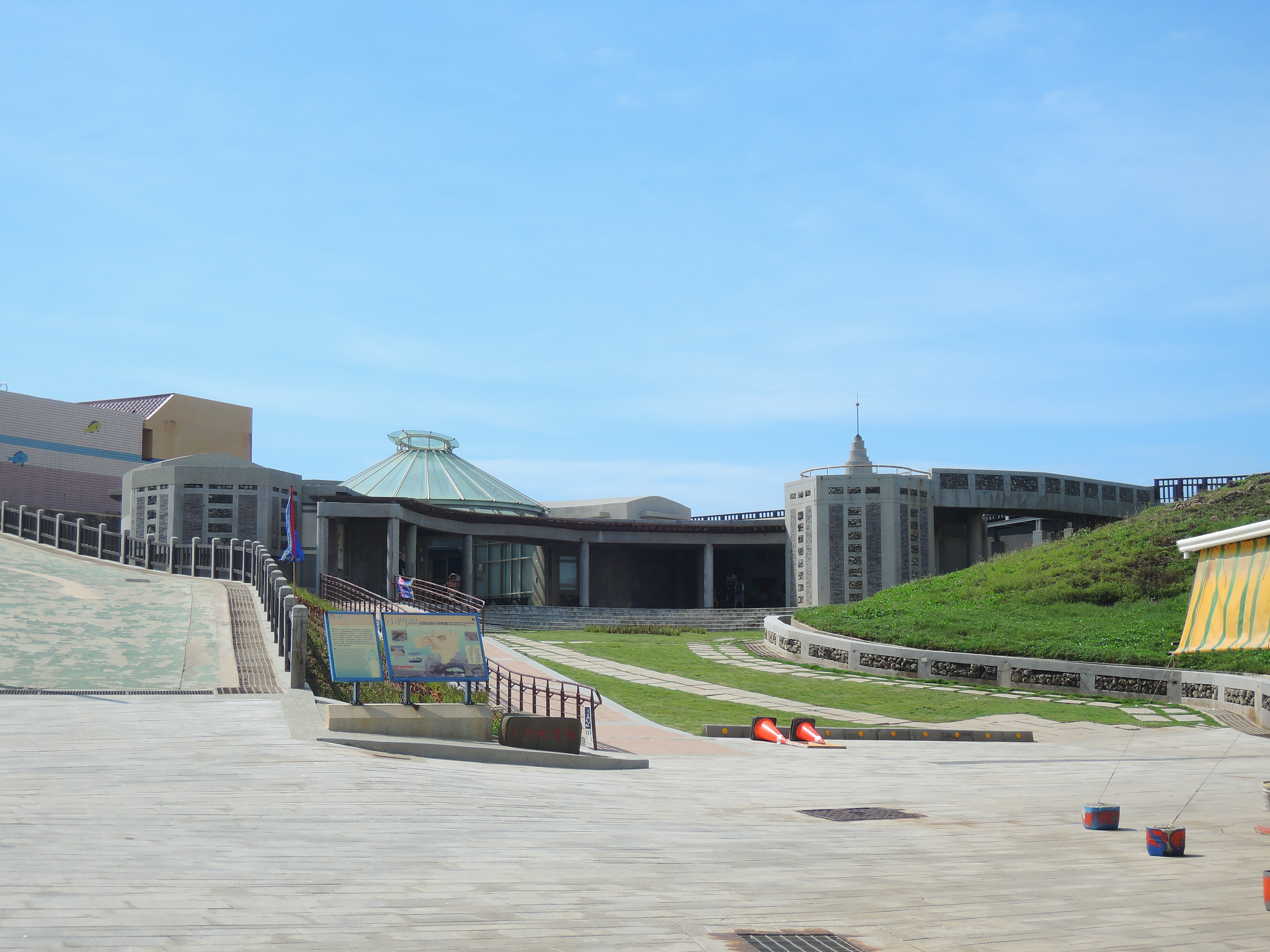
- Interactive map of the Xiaomen Geology Gallery area

General information
- Type: gallery
- Location: Xiyu, Penghu, Taiwan
- Coordinates: 24°55′50.0″N 121°22′22.3″E
- Opened: 2001

The Xiaomen Geology Gallery (traditional Chinese: 小門地質館; simplified Chinese: 小门地质馆; pinyin: Xiǎomén Dìzhíguǎn) is a gallery in Xiaomen Village, Xiyu Township, Penghu County, Taiwan.

== History ==
The gallery was opened in 2001.

== Architecture ==
The gallery is divided into eight sections, which are guide of Xiaomen Island, geomorphology of Penghu Islands, landscape model, rocks and minerals, ecology, marine ecology, culture of Xiaomen Island and showcase of specimens.

== Exhibitions ==
The gallery exhibits information, history and geological features of Penghu Islands.

== See also ==
- List of tourist attractions in Taiwan
