= Whale Cave =

Cave in Xiyu, Penghu, Taiwan

- 澎湖逍遙遊
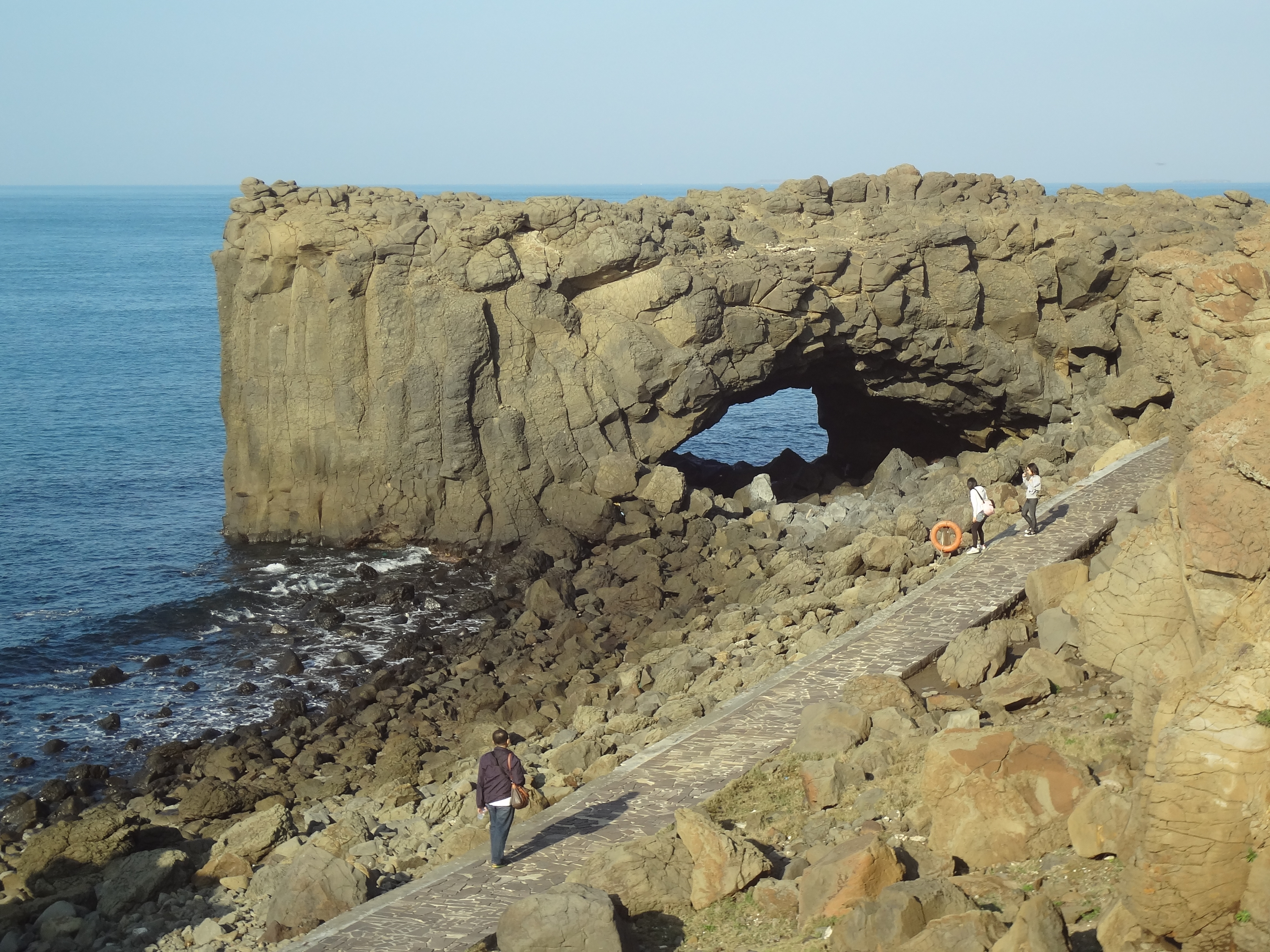

- Location within Taiwan
- Location: Xiyu, Penghu, Taiwan
- Coordinates: 23.654772°N 119.516152°E
- Geology: Wave-cut platform

The Whale Cave (Chinese: 澎湖逍遙遊; pinyin: Pēnghú Xiāoyáoyóu) is a wave-cut platform in Xiaomen Village, Xiyu Township, Penghu County, Taiwan.

== History ==
The wave is originally a basalt cliffed coast. After being continuously eroded by monsoon and seawater, it finally became an arch.

== Geology ==
The cave is located on Xiaomen Island. From the side, the hollow part roughly has the shape of a whale.

== See also ==
- Penghu National Scenic Area
