= Cape Santiago Lighthouse, Taiwan =

Lighthouse in Gongliao, New Taipei, Taiwan

Cape Santiago Lighthouse Santiao Chiao
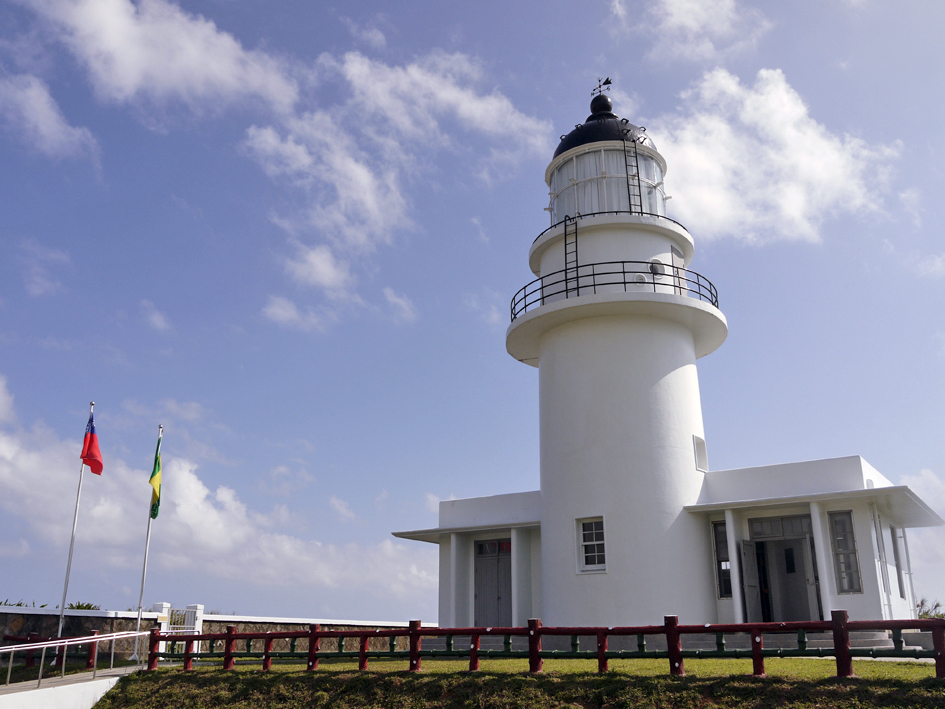
- Location: Cape Santiago; Gongliao District; New Taipei; Taiwan
- Coordinates: 25°0′26.7″N 122°0′6.9″E

Tower
- Constructed: 1931
- Construction: concrete tower
- Height: 16.5 meters (54 ft)
- Shape: cylindrical tower with balcony and lantern
- Markings: white tower, black lantern dome
- Power source: mains electricity
- Operator: Northeast Coast National Scenic Area

Light
- Focal height: 100.6 meters (330 ft)
- Lens: 2nd order clamshell Fresnel lens
- Range: white: 24 nautical miles (44 km; 28 mi) red: 20 nautical miles (37 km; 23 mi)
- Characteristic: Fl (2) WR 28s.

The Cape Santiago Lighthouse (traditional Chinese: 三貂角燈塔; simplified Chinese: 三貂角灯塔; pinyin: Sāndiāojiǎo Dēngtǎ or Santiaochiao Lighthouse) is a lighthouse at Cape Santiago, Gongliao District, New Taipei, Taiwan.

== History ==
The lighthouse was built in 1931 for ship navigation. Since 30 September 2018, the lighthouse has been open to the public.

== Architecture ==
The lighthouse rises up to 16.5 meters in height. The lighthouse features a gallery on its information and equipment.

== Transportation ==
The lighthouse is accessible by bus from Taipei Main Station or Fulong Station.

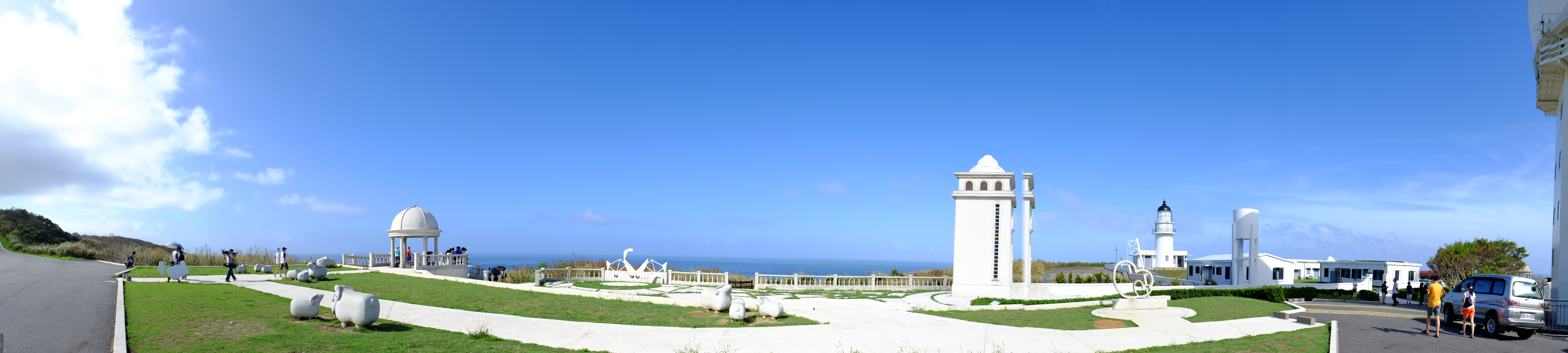
The square at Cape Santiago Lighthouse

== See also ==
- List of tourist attractions in Taiwan
- List of lighthouses in Taiwan
