= Erkan Chen Residence =

Historic house in Xiyu, Penghu, Taiwan

- 二崁陳宅
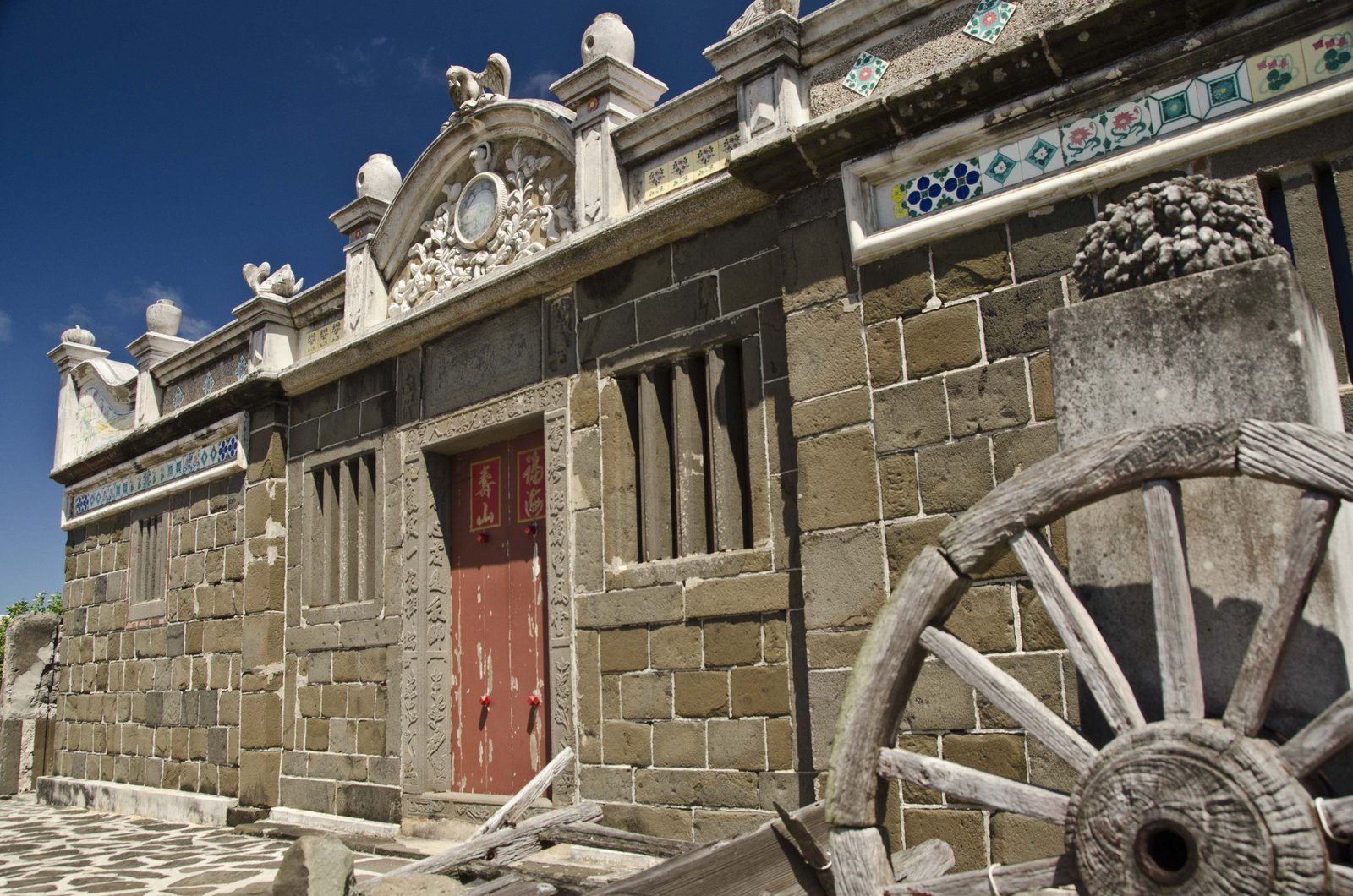
- Interactive map of the Erkan Chen Residence area

General information
- Type: former residence
- Location: Xiyu, Penghu, Taiwan
- Coordinates: 23°36′17.5″N 119°31′11.9″E
- Completed: 1910
- Cost: NT$9,000

Technical details
- Floor area: 330 m^{2}

Design and construction
- Architect: Chen Ma-ting

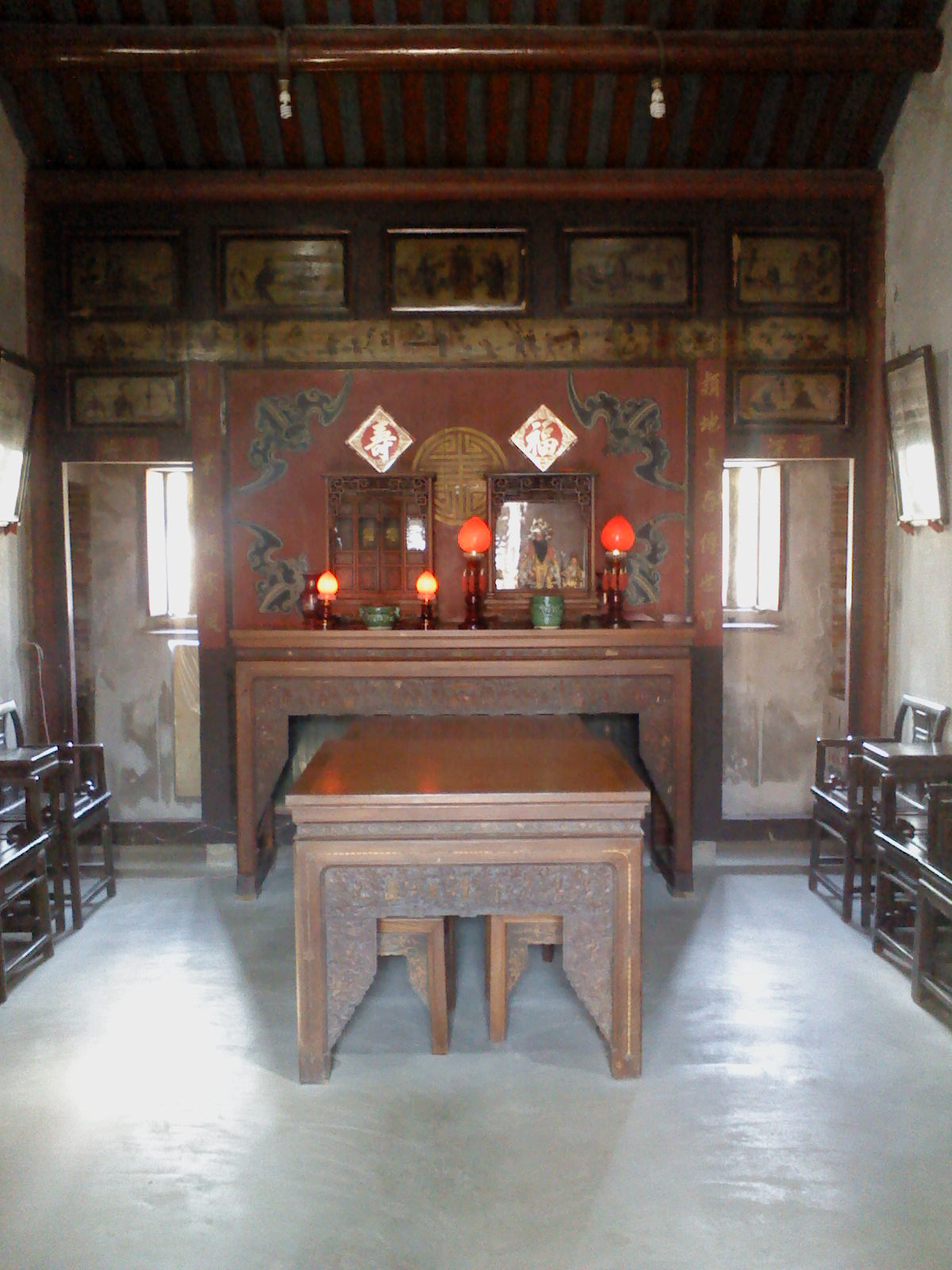
Erkan Chen Residence interior

The Erkan Chen Residence (traditional Chinese: 二崁陳宅; simplified Chinese: 二崁陈宅; pinyin: Èrkǎn Chén Zhái; Pe̍h-ōe-jī: Jī-khàm Tân Tia̍k) is a former residence in Erkan Village, Xiyu Township, Penghu County, Taiwan belongs to the Chen family.

== History ==
The residence was built in 1910 by brother Chen Ling and Chen Bang with the cost around NT$8,000 to 9,000.

== Architecture ==
The residence was built with the classic southern Fujian style, featuring relief carvings, windows, doors and eaves. It forms a rectangular shape over an area of 330 m^{2} which includes three halls.

== See also ==
- List of tourist attractions in Taiwan
