= Fangyuan =

Rural township in Changhua County, Taiwan

Coordinates: 23°55′30″N 120°18′57″E

Fangyuan Township 芳苑鄉 Sunayama
- Rural township
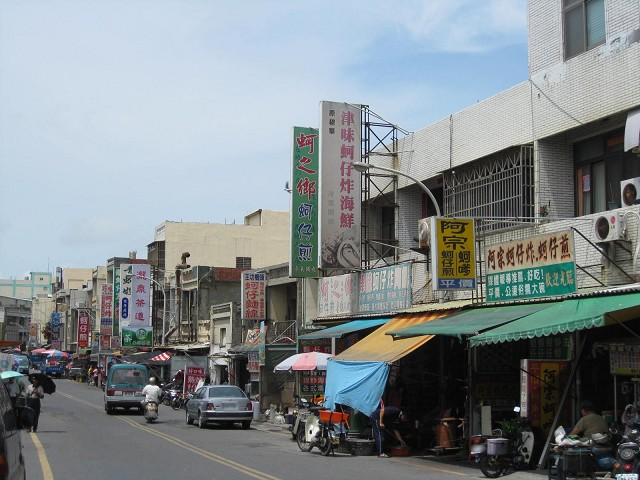

- Fangyuan Township in Changhua County
- Country: Taiwan
- Province: Taiwan Province
- County: Changhua
- Divisions: List: 26 villages

Government
  - Type: District government
  - District chief: Hong He-lu (Ind.)

Area
  - Total: 96.89 km^{2} (37.41 sq mi)

Population (January 2023)
  - Total: 31,572
  - Density: 372/km^{2} (960/sq mi)
- Postal code: 528
- Website: 芳苑鄉公所 (in Chinese)

Fangyuan Township (Chinese: 芳苑鄉; pinyin: Fāngyuàn Xiāng) is a rural township in Changhua County, Taiwan.

== History ==
People began immigrating from Fujian to the area around 1640 CE, where they practiced fishing and traded with people in Fujian. The area was then known as Fanzaiwa. The place was then renamed Sunayama Village during the Japanese rule of Taiwan because of the sand dunes of the area. After the handover of Taiwan from Japan to the Republic of China in 1945, it became part of Taichung County. It was later renamed as Fangyuan Township and became part of Changhua County.

== Geography ==
Fangyuan has been assigned the postal code 528. With a total area of 91.38 square kilometers (35.28 sq mi), the township is the second largest in Changhua County after Erlin Township. As of January 2023, there were 31,572 people in 10,129 households. The population density was 372 inhabitants per square kilometer (960/sq mi).

== Administrative divisions ==
The township comprises 26 villages: Boai, Caohu, Dingbu, Fangyuan, Fangzhong, Furong, Hanbao, Heping, Houliao, Jianping, Lunjiao, Luping, Lushang, Minsheng, Renai, Sancheng, Sange, Wanggong, Wenjin, Wujun, Xinbao, Xingren, Xinjie, Xinsheng, Xinyi and Yongxing.

== Tourist attractions ==
- Fangyuan Lighthouse
- Fuhai Temple
- Wanggong Fishing Port
