= Xiyu, Penghu =

Coordinates: 23°36′27.7″N 119°30′41.8″E

Xiyu Township 西嶼鄉 Siyu, Hsiyu
- Rural township
- Wai'an Village, Xiyu Township

- Xiyu Township in Penghu County (the Pescadores)
- Country: Republic of China (Taiwan)
- County: (Penghu County) Penghu
- Rural villages: 11

Government
  - Mayor: Hsu Yueh-Li (許月里)

Area
  - Total: 19 km^{2} (7.3 sq mi)

Population (March 2023)
  - Total: 8,301
  - Density: 440/km^{2} (1,100/sq mi)
- Time zone: UTC+8 (National Standard Time)
- Postal code: 881
- Website: www.shiyeu.gov.tw (in Chinese), www.shiyeu.gov.tw/en (in English)

Xiyu Township
- Traditional Chinese: 西嶼鄉
- Simplified Chinese: 西屿乡
Transcriptions
Standard Mandarin
- Hanyu Pinyin: Xīyǔ Xiāng
- Bopomofo: ㄒㄧ ㄩˇ ㄒㄧㄤ
- Wade–Giles: Hsi^{1}-yü^{3} Hsiang^{1}
- Tongyong Pinyin: Xi-yǔ Xiang
- IPA: [ɕí.ỳ ɕiáŋ]
Hakka
- Pha̍k-fa-sṳ: Sî-yí-hiông
Southern Min
- Hokkien POJ: Sai-sū-hiong

Xiyu Township (alternatively Siyu, Hsiyu, Si Island, Hsi Island) is a rural township in Penghu County, Taiwan. It has a population of 8,301 and an area of 18.7148 square kilometres.

The major scenic spots include some forts and lighthouse. They were built or reconstructed in the Qing dynasty, and were credited as National Relic Site of Taiwan.

== History ==
On July 16, 1683, the island was attacked by Qing forces in the Battle of Penghu.

On March 10, 2012, President Ma Ying-jeou visited the area and participated in religious ceremonies at temples in the township.

== Geography ==
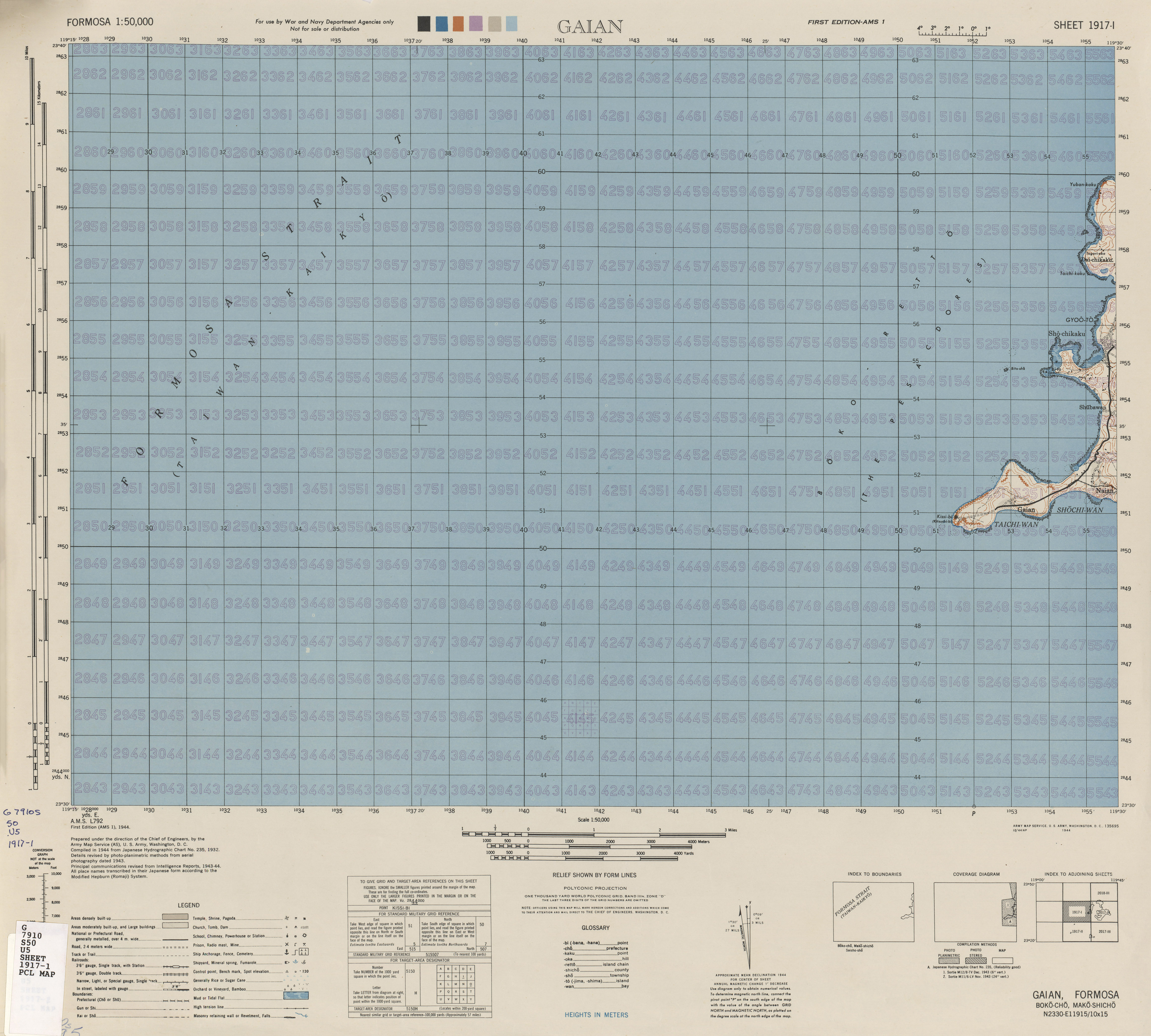
Map of part of Xiyu (labeled as GYOŌ-TŌ) (1944)

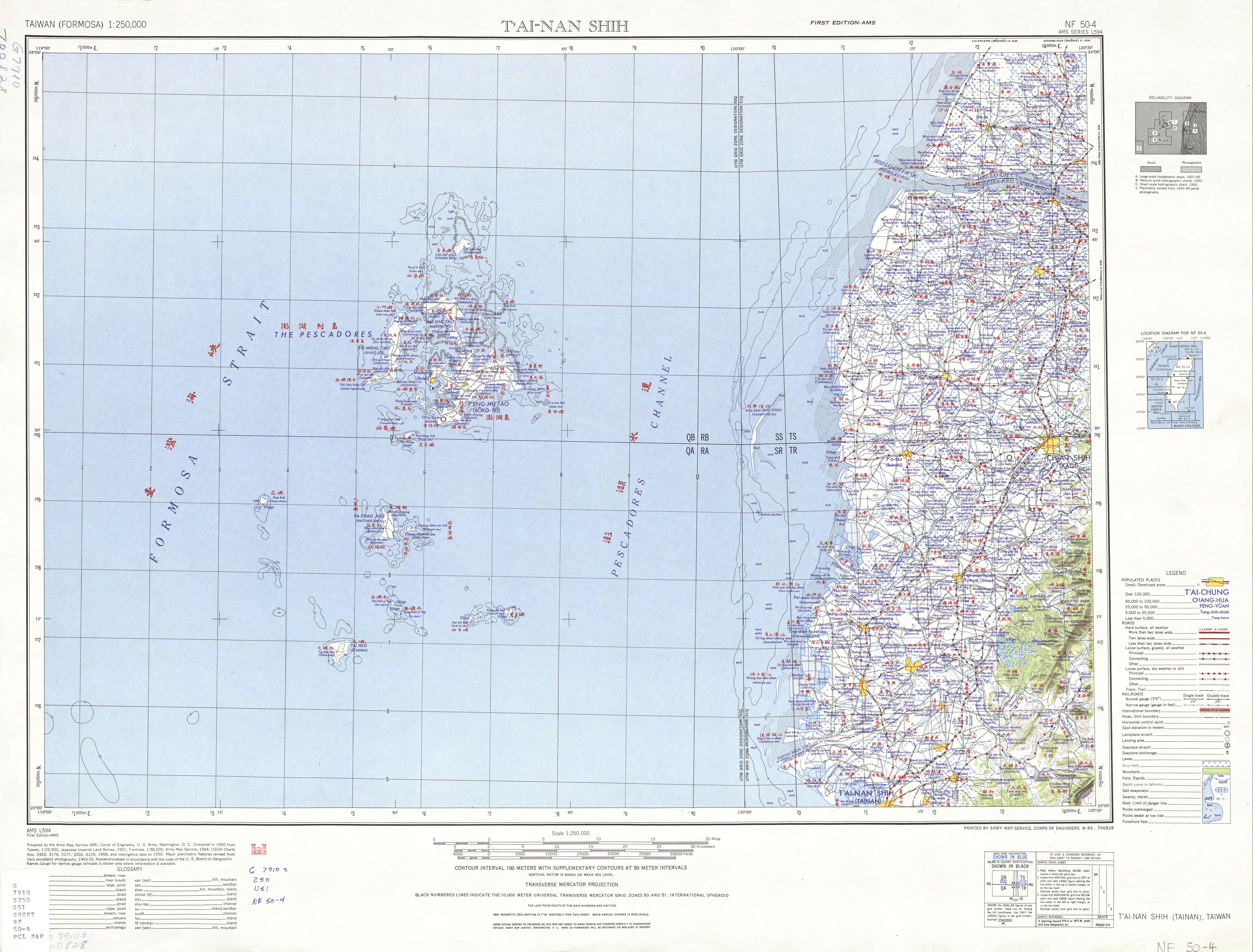
Map including Xiyu (labeled as YÜ-WENG TAO (GYOŌ-TŌ) 漁翁島) (1950)

The township includes two inhabited islands, Yuweng Island (漁翁島; Yúwēng Dǎo; Yü^{2}-weng^{1} Tao^{3}; Hî-ong Tó) and Xiaomen Islet (Siaomen Islet, Hsiaomen Island, 小門嶼; Xiǎomén Yǔ; Hsiao^{3}-men^{2} Yü^{3}; Sió-mn̂g Sū), and one small uninhabited island, Haiqian Reef (海墘礁; Hái-kînn Ta).

== Administrative divisions ==
The township includes eleven rural villages:

- Hengjiao Village (橫礁村)
- Hejie Village (合界村)
- Zhuwan Village (竹灣村)
- Xiaomen Village (小門村)
- Dachi Village (大池村)
- Erkan Village (二崁村)
- Chitung Village (池東村)
- Chixi Village (池西村)
- Chima Village (赤馬村)
- Neian Village (內垵村)
- Waian Village (外垵村)

== Tourist attractions ==
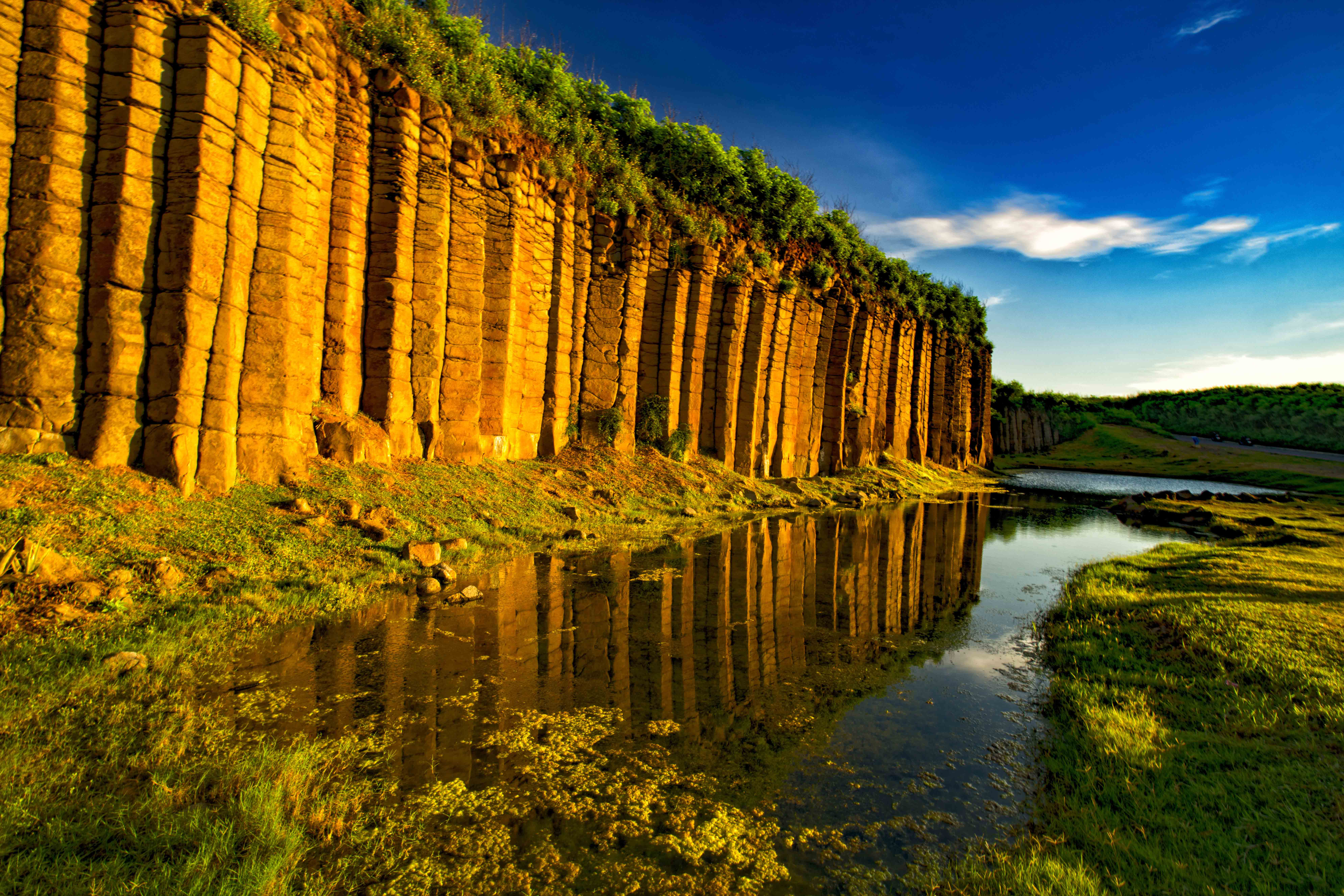
Columnar basalt on Xiyu island

- Chuwan Crab Museum
- Erkan Chen Residence
- Penghu Great Bridge
- Xiaomen Geology Gallery
- Xiyu Eastern Fort
- Xiyu Western Fort
- Whale Cave: The Xiaomen Village located exclusively at Xiaomen Island is connected to the main island of Xiyu via Xiaomen Bridge.
- Yuwengdao Lighthouse

== Transportation ==
Xiyu is connected to neighboring Baisha by the Penghu Great Bridge.

== Notable natives ==
- Huang Ching-cheng, sculptor
- Tsai De-sheng, Director-General of National Security Bureau (2009–2014)

== See also ==
- List of islands of the Republic of China
