= Maritime and Port Bureau =

Government agency of Taiwan

Coordinates: 25°01′31.3″N 121°32′50.4″E

- 航港局

Agency overview
- Formed: 1 March 2012
- Headquarters: Daan, Taipei, Taiwan
- Agency executive: David Hsieh, director-general
- Parent agency: Ministry of Transportation and Communications
- Website: Official website

The Maritime and Port Bureau (MPB; Chinese: 航港局; pinyin: Hánggǎng Jú) is the port authority under the Ministry of Transportation and Communications of the Republic of China (Taiwan) responsible for building a quality environment for the maritime industry, reinforce maritime capabilities for higher competitiveness, implement national maritime policies, maintain order and safety at sea and cultivate maritime human resources in Taiwan.

== History ==
The bureau was established on 1 March 2012, in accordance with the Taiwan International Ports Corporation, Ltd. Establishment Act.

According to the act, the Ministry of Transportation and Communications would merge the port operations of Keelung Harbor Bureau, Taichung Harbor Bureau, Kaohsiung Harbor Bureau and Hualien Harbor Bureau, to form the Taiwan International Ports Corporation.

The remaining operations of the four harbor bureaus, mainly concerning maritime administration, were integrated to form the new Maritime and Port Bureau.

== Organizational structures ==
- Planning Division
- Maritime Affairs Division
- Vessel Management Division
- Port Affairs Division
- Crew Management Division
- Maritime Safety Division
- Secretariat
- Personnel Office
- Civil Service Ethics Office
- Comptroller Office
- Information Management Office
- Maritime Affairs Center
- Lighthouses

== Transportation ==
The building is accessible within walking distance east of Technology Building station of the Taipei Metro.

== See also ==
- Ministry of Transportation and Communications (Taiwan)
- Transportation in Taiwan
