= Penghu National Scenic Area =

Protected area in Taiwan

- Traditional Chinese: 澎湖國家風景區
Transcriptions
Standard Mandarin
- Hanyu Pinyin: Pénghú Guójiā Fēngjǐng Qū

The Penghu National Scenic Area is one of the National Scenic Areas of the Republic of China (Taiwan), and covers most, but not all of the islands and islets that form Penghu County. These islands have a total of 320 kilometers of shoreline. A National Scenic Area is not a National Park. National Scenic Areas fall within the control of the Tourism Bureau of the Ministry of Transportation and Communications of the Republic of China, while national parks fall within the jurisdiction of the Ministry of Interior of the Republic of China. The philosophies that govern the development of the two types of areas differ. For a national park the emphasis is on the preservation of natural and cultural resources, and development for human utilization is definitely a secondary priority. For a national scenic area, the priorities are more balanced between preservation and tourism utilization. This has led to conflicts between preservationists and those more favorable to the development of the area. The National Park Law of the Republic of China only applies to the latter areas. Studies about the project were first debated since the beginning of 1990 and, after a year of evaluations carried out by the Tourism Bureau of the Ministry of Transportation and Communications of the Republic of China, it was officially created in February 1991, when the Penghu office was finally established. The aim of the project was to "efficiently utilize the local resources and help Penghu's economic growth", while building vacation spots on the coast of Taiwan's only island county to attract both Taiwanese nationals and foreigners, making of Penghu an "International tourism vacation center". It is a well known scenic area for its sandy beaches. The tourist season in Penghu starts in April and peaks from June through August. The Scenic Area attracts thousands of weekenders with its brisk sea breezes and scenery. But when the autumn gales begin to blow in October, the archipelago becomes deserted until April, when warmer weather seems to thaw the local tourism industry. In addition to its rich oceanic resources, Penghu offers fantastic sights of basalt column formations. The scenic area lures more than 200 species of migratory birds, making it an important spot for Asia's birdwatchers. It was not always like this: for much of the second half of the past century, the Government of the Republic of China saw the islands in mainly political and military terms, as a naval base: "Penghu was regarded as a military base until the early 1990s. As a result, the central government never wanted to develop the islands, which resulted in Penghu's shortages of water and electricity and, of course, a lot of five-star hotels".

In 2002 "Penghu Columnar Basalt Nature Reserve" was listed as a potential World Heritage Site.

The National Scenic Area comprises most, but not all, of Penghu County, and its divided into three recreation areas:

- North Sea recreation area,
- Magong recreation area, and
- South Sea recreation area.

== North Sea recreation area (北海遊憩系統) ==
The area is home to coral reefs, tropical fish, green sea turtles and whales.

Among the tourism routes in Penghu, the natural landscape and ecology of the North Sea islets, fishing villages and water activities are the most popular among tourists. The entire Jibei islet of Penghu North Sea is 3.1 square kilometres in area, and it has a coastline of 10 km; being the largest island on the North Sea recreation area. The Sand Beach Beak, southwest of Jibei islet houses a white sand beach extending 1500m, mainly composed of corals and shell fragments that were shipped to shore by the sea. The North Sea Recreation Area is a perfect site for all kinds of water activities. Xianjiao islet; situated south of Jibei islet, won its name due to the vast amount of submerged reefs around the island (Xianjiao means dangerous reefs), and houses rich resources under the sea; the sand beach and its shallow coral ground is the best place for snorkeling and water activities. Tiejhan islet is a classic basaltic hill terrain, and many seabirds come here during the summer to dwell and breed, making this place a spot for bird-watching. The nearby Gupo islet has an abrasion plateau which will be covered in the best quality wild laver at the end of winter, which is the ideal season for laver harvest. Mudou islet situated at the north end houses the Mudou islet Lighthouse.

=== Jibei Island ===
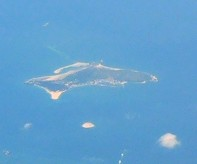
Jibei Island

Jibei Island is commonly used for water activities, and the island houses various types of recreational activities, including banana boat, dragged buoy, two-man speedboat, water motorcycle, under-the-sea sightseeing boat, paragliding and snorkeling. Another tourism feature of Jibei is the number of "stone weirs" housed here; there are over 80 stone weirs, more than any other places in Penghu, thus winning the name "Home of the Stone Weirs"

=== Mudou islet ===
Mudou Islet (Chinese: 目斗嶼) is situated at the north end of the Penghu islands, only 7 km away from Jibei islet to the south; the island is 454 metres in perimeter and only 0.021 square kilometres in area, it is a tiny islet, famous for its Mudou Lighthouse. The waters between Mudou islet and Jibei islet consist of a deep water abrasion platform, and submerged reefs can be found everywhere in the area, hence, the numerous accounts of shipwrecks. It is said that ancestors who lived on Jibei used to pick up floating stuff from the wrecked ships. But for precisely the same reason, animals and plants under the sea can all enjoy sufficient sunlight, and people above water can also see right to the bottom of the ocean. To ensure the safety of the boats while travelling the dangerous area, the lighthouse was built on Mudou in 1921, when Taiwan was a Japanese colony. An iron-framed lighthouse of 40 metres high, painted in black and white stripes, standing as the tallest lighthouse in East Asia.

The lighthouse is equipped with its own generators. The basalt that formed Mudou islet still maintains its primitive landscape, with black rocks tightly surrounding the island. There is a shallow sand belt between Mudou and Jibei, extending hundreds of meters long and 5m wide, where the water only comes up to the knees. Seashells can also be found. Another special landscape of Mudou islet is the underwater tunnel. It is at the bottom of a steep cliff, hidden by the sea during flood tide, but when the tide ebbs, people can walk in sideways. The tunnel is about 80m long, it is a special basalt fissure.

=== Gupo Island ===
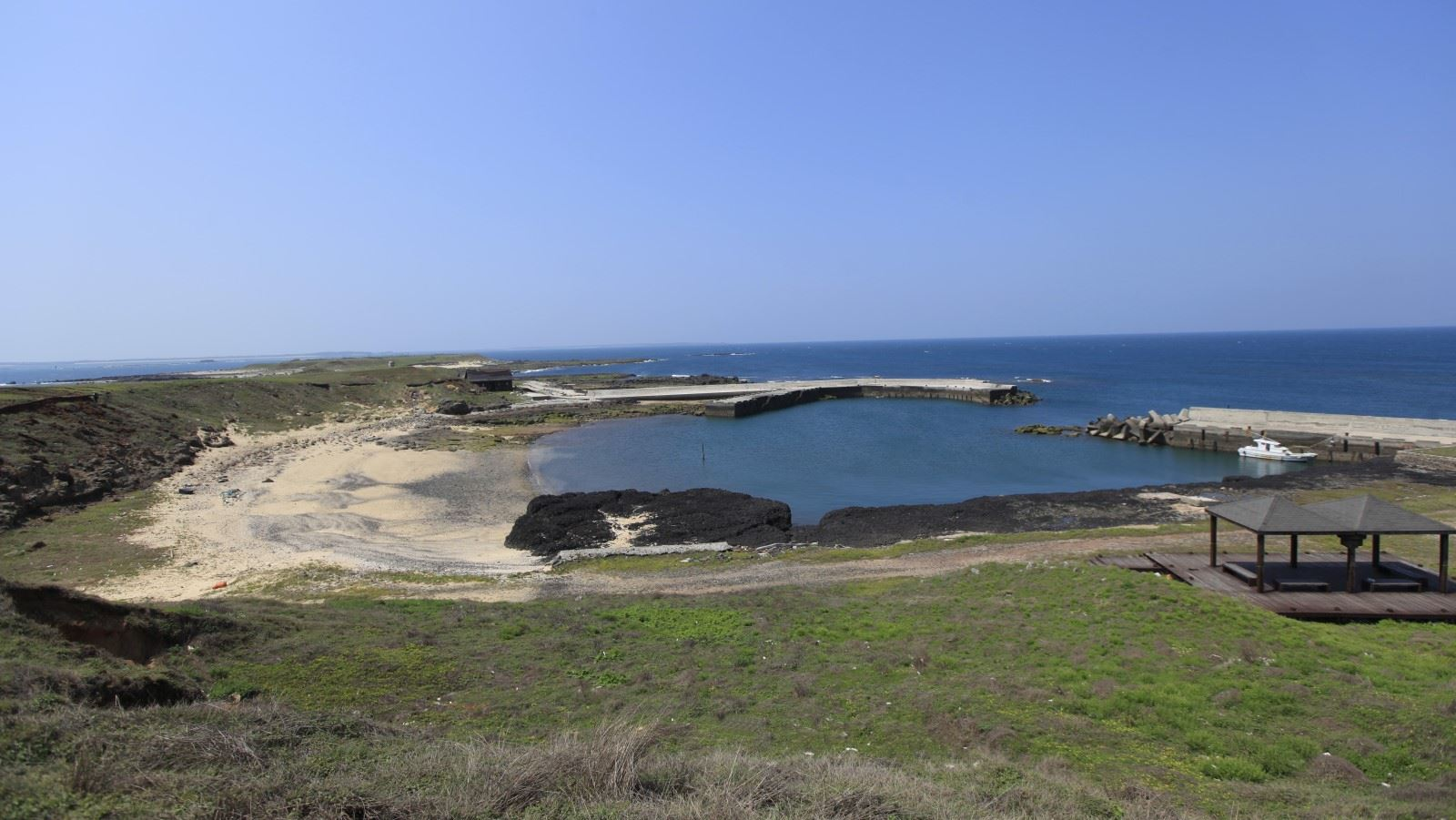
Gupo Island

Gupo Island is situated northwest of Baisha and southwest of Jibei Island. It is a mesa plateau composed by basalt; extending 1 metre from north to south, being the largest unmanned island among the Penghu archipelago. The islet has a lot of vesicular basalt, but the surface is covered with ferruginous quartz sandstone. The islet houses a British Shipwreck Monument, on its east side is the silver anchovy fish ground, and the southeast side houses corals. The north side is the famous laver ground, Penghu island has a lot of reefs and is extremely windy with big waves during the winter, and this place is known far and wide for its abundant harvest of laver; towards the end of every lunar year, there will be a large harvest event, when firecrackers will be lit, and everybody will bring out their best skills to harvest laver.

The origin of the name Gupo has aroused the curiosity from many. There is a legend that says that a long time ago, there lived a young lady, who had a boyfriend whom she had loved for years; however, her parents were against this relationship and forced her to marry someone else. The girl decided to run away from home to fight against her parents' decision to marry her to someone else, and also to prove that her love with her boyfriend was strong. She came to the unmanned island and lived out her days all alone. When her younger family members visited her, they would call her "Gupo" (姑婆, great aunt) out of respect.

=== Xianjiao islet ===
Xianjiao Islet (Chinese: 險礁嶼) is located south of Jibei islet, Baisha Township in Penghu County, and north of Chihkan. This place won its name because it is surrounded by submerged reefs (險礁, xianjiao), but the surrounding underwater natural resources are rich, making this a great spot for snorkeling. In addition to the abrasion platform formed by a small rock on the east half of Xianjiao islet, most of the island is a white sand beach composed of sand grains, shell and coral fragments. The name warns passing-by boats to beware of the waters here.

=== Yuanbei Island ===
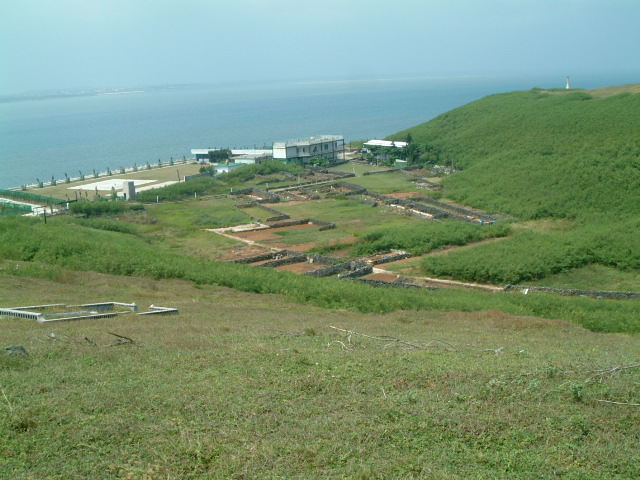
Yuanbei Island

Yuanbei Island is situated east of the Citou Village on Baisha islet. The entire Yuanbei islet is a hill, and it was named so because it is shaped like a seashell covering the water (員貝 means "circular shell"). The basalt columnar joints of the north coast on Yuanbei are well developed, among which, the stone pen and stone ink holder is most renowned; the east coast of Yuanbei islet has a piece of flat columnar basalt, with its surfaces full of wrinkles just like a pleated skirt; this is a place visitors know for its "one pen, one ink holder, one skirt" view, currently listed as the Basalt Reservation Area.

==== Yuanbei islet shallow water path ====
When the tide ebbs, there will be a shallow water path extending from Cao islet to the Guardian Stone; the 4.6 km shallow water path can take you to Shagang Village on the other side. The Yuanbei islet shallow water path is composed of stone plates, stone fragments and coral reefs, it is a sea path which Yuanbei ancestors used to rely on for outside contact, bearing significant historical meaning, adding to the fact that there is a rich shallow sea ecology here, the Yuanbeiyu shallow water path has become a popular route in recent years.

== Magong Island Recreation Area ==
Magong Island Recreation Area (Chinese: 馬公本島遊憩系統) includes Magong Island (馬公本島, the main island), Pengnan area (澎南地區), Xiyu Township (西嶼鄉), Baisha Township (白沙鄉) and Huxi Township (湖西鄉).

During the Ming and Qing Dynasties, Magong City (馬公市) was an important commercial and trade center across the Taiwan Strait, which gradually evolved into an important administration area for Penghu today. After hundreds of years, many historic heritages were left behind (Dutch, Portuguese and French). Magong City reflects in its architecture the historical evolution of the county.

Xiyu Township is situated west of the Magong Island. The island is filled with well-known tourist sites, including the natural bay of Zhuwan (竹灣), and the Dachi (大池) sand beach on the southwest side, which is the most famous beach in the national scenic area and the county. The "Yuweng Lighthouse" (漁翁燈塔), standing on the southeast end of the island, is the oldest lighthouse in the whole of Taiwan.

Baisha Township is a famous spot for bird-watching. The nearby Chikan (赤崁) underground reservoir is the one and only underground reservoir in Taiwan.

The northeast coast of Huxi Township is geologically complicated, and a long period of erosion has led to a multi-variant geological environment, such as Beiliao Peninsula (北寮半島) and Qingluo Peninsula (青螺半島).

=== Beiliao Recreation Area (北寮遊憩區) ===
"Starry Kuibi"(奎壁聯輝) of Beiliao Kuibi (北寮奎壁) is one of the eight most renowned views in the Magong area of the National Scenic Area, and wave-chasing in Kuibishan (奎壁山), located in Beiliao, has become an important tourism resource in Penghu. The original name was very similar to its present one: the place was firstly named Guibishan (龜壁山), which translated means "turtle wall mountain", because when looking at Beiliao coast from a distance, the area's shape resembles a sea turtle bending over on the sea. However, this suggestive name was later changed to its present one, which sounds pretty similar: Kuibishan (奎壁山), which is a homonymic sound.

In the past, on a full-moon night, when there were still many fishing boats out on the sea towards the east, you would feel as if you were part of the starry sky; thus such view was named "Starry Kuibi".

=== Guoye Sunrise Observatory (菓葉觀日樓) ===
Located to the south of the previous location, the observatory

=== Nei'an Recreation Area ===
Nei'an Recreation Area (Chinese: 內垵遊憩區) houses an enormous beach, well known for its clear waters and white sand. The flat terrain provided residents of Nei'an Village (內垵村) and Wai'an Village (外安村) a place to play with water and engage in intertidal zone activities. At the back of the beach is a narrow wooden path built according to the terrain, from there, you can look at Houziwei Cape (鱟仔尾岬) in Chixi (池西) from a distance.

Neian North Sea Fishing Port has been selected by the Penghu County Government to build the first Waterpark in Taiwan.

=== Xiaomen Geology Gallery ===
Penghu is primarily composed of solidified lava from successive volcano eruptions, that endured and suffered the erosion of wind, rain and wave erosion during centuries, before becoming the present geological landscape. The place is known for its shaped rocks. Xiaomen Geology Gallery is situated at the entrance of the Xiaomen Recreational Area. The exhibition hall houses an information post.

==== Xiaomen islet (小門嶼) ====
Xiaomen islet (Xiaomen Yu) is situated in Xiaomen Village (小門村) in Xiyu Township, north of Xi islet (西嶼), being 0.5121 square kilometers in area. It has long been known as the "Pearl of Houmen". Xiaomen Bridge connects Xiaomen islet with Xi islet Township, where there is a Scenic Center and a car park, as well as a path around the island, making this a famous scenic site. The name has its own history: East of Xiaomen Village lies a path with mountains on both sides. In the past, this path was the only access to the outside for villagers in the village, and the path looked like a small door (the literal meaning of Xiaomen) from a distance, hence the name.

=== Tongliang Great Banyan (通樑古榕) ===
In front of the Baoan Temple (保安宮) in Tongliang Village (通樑村), there is an old banyan (Ficus benghalensis) dated over 300 years, which is the oldest and largest tree in Penghu, (it occupies a total of 95 cubic feet), which provides shadow for people. If visitors do not look closely, they can hardly tell that they are all from the same trunk. There is a legend about this tree: it says that during 1662–1722, a merchant vessel passed the waters around Tongliang when it encountered a shipwreck, and the only thing that survived was a sapling floating on the sea. Residents of Tongliang picked it up and planted it in front of the temple; judging by this legend, the Tongliang Great Banyan could possibly be over 300 years old. However, there is still another legend saying that the Tongliang Great Banyan is probably only a hundred years old: according to Chinese planting customs, trees are usually planted after a temple is built, so, judging by the history of Baoan Temple, which was established just over a hundred years ago, and not three centuries, the Tongliang Great Banyan could be not that old.

=== Zhongtun Wind Power Area (中屯風力區) ===
The wind farm sits in Zhongtun Village (中屯村) of Baisha Township, and it was the second wind farm to be built in the Republic of China. It has been in operation since August 2001. Such a construction would be unthinkable if Penghu were a National park.

=== Caiyuan Leisure Fishery Farm (菜園休閒漁業區) ===
During the Qing Dynasty, the terrain here was relatively lower than today with abundant water resources and rich fertile soils. Green vegetables were growth in large patches, so the place was named Caiyuan, which literally translates as vegetable garden.

Caiyuan is situated southeast of Magong, close to the inner bay northeast of the inland sea; the rich oceanic resources housed here enables a diversified ecology park, including wetland ecology and shallow coral grounds. Like all fishing ports, Caiyuan Fishing Port also has fresh fishes from the sea, and oyster and near-sea net cage activities can also be seen. There is a "Caiyuan Life Memorial Park" nearby.

=== Shili Beach (蒔裡沙灘) ===
The beach is situated on Fenggui Peninsula (風櫃半島), down the south end of Magong City. This spot, located on the southwestern side, extends over 1 kilometer and it's also a well known sandy beach. Water activities and snorkeling can be practiced here. There is an earth mound just north of Shili Village (蒔裡村), shaped like a shamao (紗帽), the hat officials wore in the pre-republican era. Following this similarity, the mound was called Shamao Hill (紗帽山). Shili just happens to be inside the extended part of the shamao (pronounced as "shi" in Taiwanese). Hence the village was named "Shinei" (蒔內) or "Shili" (蒔裡). Both "nei" and "li" means "inside").

=== Shanshui Beach (山水沙灘) ===
Shanshui used to be called "sow in water" (豬母落水). A legend says that there was once a sow on the beach who got dragged into the sea by a giant octopus, so the place was named sow in water. During the Japanese colonization of Taiwan and Penghu, the place was renamed to "sow water" (豬母水), and then "Shanshui" (山水) after the retrocession of both Taiwan and Penghu to the Republic of China on 25 October 1945 at the end of the Second World War. The area comprised between Guanyin Mountain (觀音山), near the Shanshui fishing port east of Shanshui south-bank, and Zhumushuishan (豬母水山) on the west side, is called Zhumushuian (豬母水垵).

=== Fenggui Cave ===
To listen to the waves at Fenggui Cave is a well-known activity in Penghu. Fenggui Village (風櫃里) is situated at the very end of Fenggui Peninsula (風櫃半島), so this place used to be called "End of Fenggui" (風櫃尾). The south coast of the village has well-developed basalt columns, and there is an abrasion ditch eroded by the waves and a sea hole at the bottom of the abrasion ditch due to erosion. From the sea hole, there is an opening that goes up to the ground following the joint fissure, so that every time the tide rises, the waves will pour into the abrasion ditch, push the air inside the sea hole, and gush out the opening along the joint fissure carrying some sea water, making a howling sound, just like the noise made by a wind pumper.

=== Lintou Park and Aimen Beach (林投公園、隘門沙灘) ===
The beach in front of Lintou Park stretches across four villages, including Jianshan (尖山), Wuni (烏泥), Lintou (林投) and Aimen (隘門), rounding to a total of over 3,000 meters. It is the longest beach in the entire Penghu, surrounding the south coast of Hushi Township (湖西鄉). The sand on the beach is thin and smooth, the water is clear and clean. Originally obscure (it is next to the No. 9 public cemetery), people initially didn't pay attention to the beach at all. With the help of the Northeast monsoon, sand here were started to swept away and the beach was gradually disappearing. However, starting from 1998, "Li Tianyu", head of Aimen Village (隘門村), started reforming the community beach himself with the help of his son, putting up street lamps and nets to stop the sand from disappearing. Their effort finally won the attention of the county government and the Penghu National Scenic Center, which listed budgets to reconstruct Aimen beach, finally making this place the beach it is today.

== South sea recreation area ==
South Sea Recreation Area (Chinese: 南海遊憩系統) includes Tongpan islet (桶盤嶼), Hujing Island (虎井嶼), Wangan Township (望安鄉) and Cimei Township (七美鄉). Tongpan islet and Hujing islet are both known for their abundant geological features: the entire Tongpan islet is surrounded by basalt columns of clear lines that form walls, the most enriched in Penghu, and has long been known as the "Yellowstone Park of Penghu".

Wangan Township (望安鄉) used to be known as "Bazhao" (八罩), "zhao" (罩) in Taiwanese means "collective", which is the collection of eight islands. Since Wangan Island houses a harbor with a seabed composed by a mixture of sand beach and mud, in the early days, in addition to coastal fishery and intertidal zone fishing, local residents used to round up catches with a drag net. The sound was pretty similar to the Chinese pronunciation of 望安 (wang'an), hence the name.

Cimei islet (七美嶼) is the fifth largest island in Penghu, and it's situated at the south end of the archipelago. The natural terrain is well preserved on the island. The spot has had several names during history: between 1662 and 1722, Cimei islet was called "Nan Islet" (South islet, 南嶼), later on the name was changed to "Nanda Islet" (big south islet, 南大嶼). During the last days of the Qing Dynasty, the name was changed again to "Da islet" (big islet, 大嶼), and this name was used until after the retrocession of Taiwan to the Republic of China in 1945. In 1949, the fourth mayor of Penghu County, Mr. Liu Yanfu (劉燕夫), agreed to change the official name of the islet to "Cimei" (in Mandarin Chinese it means seven beauties, 七美). The local legend says that there were seven beautiful women on the island that, in order to avoid being raped by pirates, committed suicide throwing themselves into a water well. The site of the well is now revered as the tomb of the seven.

=== Tongpan Geology Park (桶盤地質公園) ===
Tongpan islet is 6 nautical miles off the coast of Magong Island. The entire island is surrounded by columns of basalt. The columnar joints and platy joints on this island are all very well developed: being originally a hexagon or a pentagon, the rock columns are now pretty much circular on the edges due to erosion. The color has also faded due to oxidation, some parts of the basalt columns have already been transformed into a ball shape. There is an abrasion platform on the southwestern coast of Tongpan that has a concentric circles formed by the basalt lava, called the "lotus platform" (蓮花座).

=== Hujing Island Recreation Area (虎井嶼遊憩區) ===
Hujing Island sits seven nautical miles off the coast of Magong City. The trip from there takes about 25 minutes by boat. The seventh largest island in Penghu is flat and low in the center, rising up on the east and west, with basaltic transverse joints lined up along the coast. When the tide ebbs, visitors can see the clear sea water, which is what makes this place, "Hujing Clear Deep" (虎井澄淵), one of the eight best known sights in Penghu. There is also a legend: the legend of "Hujing Sunken City" (虎井沈城). It says that there was something that resembled a decadent city wall lying at the bottom of the ocean beneath Hujing. There has never been a real answer as to what the truth really is, and there has long been two discrepant theories among academics: one states that "the sunken ancient city is the basaltic columnar joint terrain extended under the sea from Tongpan and Hujing, therefore forming the false impression of a sunken city". The other theory says that there must be another reason for it, because the structure is documented in historical literature, and not only is in the ancient history books, but also in many local legends that name this unusual sight.

=== Yuanyang Hole, Zangjun Cave (鴛鴦窟、藏軍洞) ===
"Mandarin ducks hole" (Yuanyang Hole) is situated northeast of Wangan Island. It is a naturally formed valley. Legend says that in the early days, there were many water holes here, and mandarin ducks used to dabble with water and rest here, hence it was named "Yuanyang Hole" (鴛, yuan, means male Mandarin duck -Aix galericulata- and 鴦, yang, means female Mandarin duck). There is an islet that forms a barrier on the sea that protects the place from strong waves. The islet has a mountain that resembles a horse (馬, ma, in Mandarin Chinese), so the islet is called Ma'an Mountain Islet (馬鞍山嶼). Taking this into consideration, the place was transformed into an important Japanese Navy base during the Japanese occupation of Taiwan and Penghu. The origins of Zangjun Cave are closely associated with this period of the history of Taiwan too. In 1944, during the Second World War, the Imperial Japanese Army forced the residents of Wangan and Zangjun islands to dig this cave to store gunpowder and weapons. It was also designed to be used as a bomb shelter for residents to cover from air raids. Just before it was to be completed, Japan declared its unconditional surrender, and the base was abandoned. Many of the caves initially built have collapsed, but some of them can still be seen.

=== Tiantai Hill ===
Tiantai Hill (Chinese: 天台山) is situated on Wangan Islet. Gangqiu Grassland (岡丘草原) is the highest place on Tiantai Hill. Nearby, the place for the famous Penghu aragonite can be seen. The surrounding grassland is flat, with occasional cattle or goats trotting by. Tiantai Hill has become the best place to watch Wangan Islet and Hua islet from a distance. Tiantai Hill is a piece of micro-gabbro rock with sheeting joints. There is a magnificent basalt landscape beneath the sea cliff on the west side and visitors will also see a hole of about 30 meters high that leads directly to the sea. Some "stone flowers" can also be seen.

=== Wang'ankou beach ===
Wang'ankou Beach (Chinese: 網垵口沙灘) is called the "Dream Beach" because of its soft white sand accompanied by clear blue ocean. Whenever the tide rises, the clean white beach will enter the clear blue ocean. When watched from the distance, it looks just like a skirt, swaying in the wind. The beach is also a place green turtles migrate back to. From May to October, visitors can see the crawl marks on the beach left behind by the turtles. Professional guides provide tourists with the necessary explanations.

=== Wangan Green Turtle Tourism and Conservation Center ===
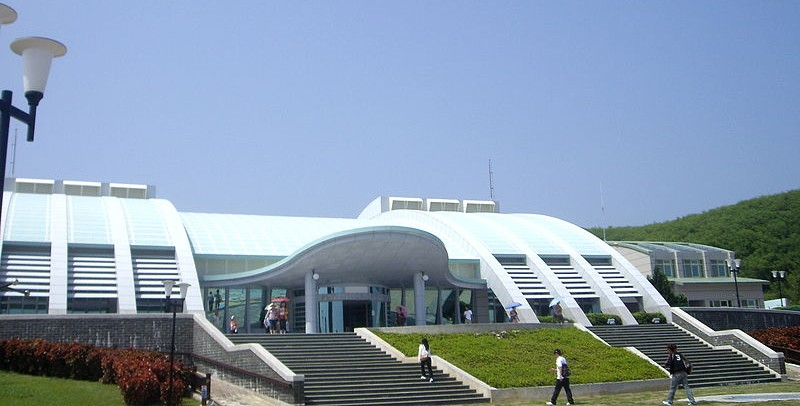
Wangan Green Turtle Tourism and Conservation Center

In 1994, the first green turtle carrying a satellite tracker set out from Wangan in Penghu, heading North crossed the Taiwan Strait, through the East China Sea Shelf, ending up in an island south of Kyūshū in Japan. The turtle spent three years and traveled 3,400 kilometers back to Penghu, providing an important record for the research of green turtles in Taiwan. Many beaches on the island of Taiwan were recorded to have sea turtles coming ashore to lay eggs, but as development changed the coastal environment, fewer places were able to support natural life. Today, there are only a few places left in the island of Taiwan, but the reserve in Wangan Township of Penghu County is a place where green turtles visit more often and more steady to lay eggs. Shouldn't be a surprise, considering the low level of development of the area. Standing southeast of Wangan islet, there is a building shaped like a sea turtle: it's the Wangan Green Turtle Tourism and Conservation Center.

=== Zhongshe Historical House (中社古厝) ===
This spot is one of the more well-preserved traditional houses in Penghu County. Originally named "Flower House" (花宅), the legend says that when this village was firstly established, their ancestors looked at the local terrain, and discovered that the mountains surrounding the place were just like lotus petals. Therefore, they firstly named the land around "the heart of the flower" (山仔尾頂, Shanziweiding) and built a house, thus naming it "Flower House", also meaning that the house that was built at the heart of the flower. In 1971, the late president Chiang Ching-kuo visited the flower house, and observing that it sits in the middle of other four villages in Wangan Township, renamed it "Zhongshe" (中社, the village in the middle). The village is filled with ancient houses that are built of coral. There were originally over 80 sanheyuan (三合院, old three-section compound house), and now only about 50 of them are still well-preserved. The architectural style of the historical houses in Zhongshe Village is called "one stamp" style sanheyuan (一顆印式三合院建築).

=== Double-Heart of Stacked Stones ===
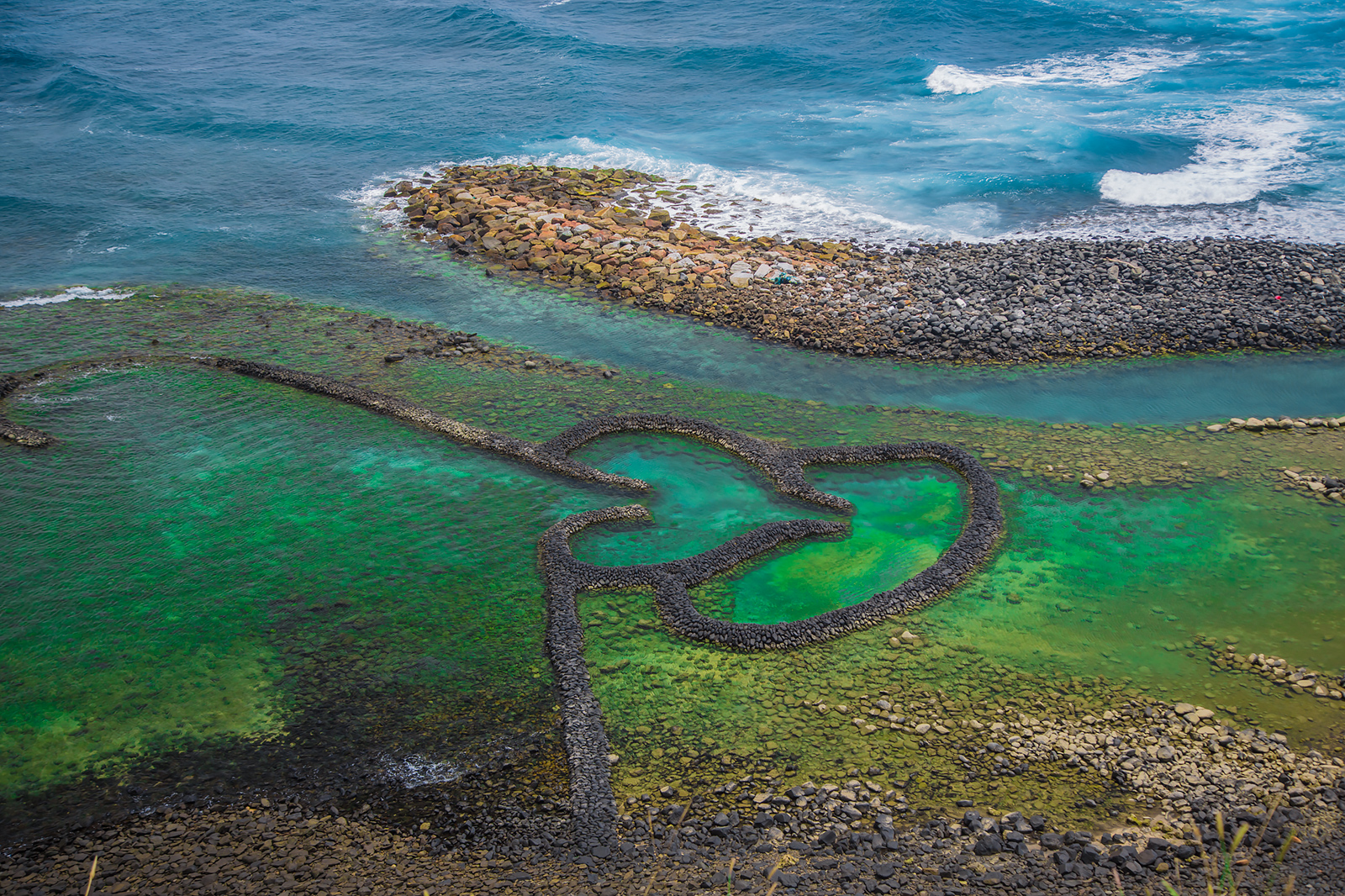
Double-Heart of Stacked Stones

There are a total of 558 stone weirs in Penghu, and up to 88 of them are distributed around Jibei islet, ranking first in the world both in terms of number and density. Local ancestors fed generations of offspring toiling away with these stone weir. Cimei islet has only one stone weir, but because it is shaped like two hearts, it is famous for being the Double-Heart of Stacked Stones. Originally, the stacked stones was built out of basalt and coral reefs as traditional traps for fishing. Today, the catches have gradually decreased, but the twin hearts design of the stone weir attracts endless tourists here. Twin hearts stone weir is the most well-preserved stone weir in the entire of Penghu. Visitors should check the tide ebb time for the day to see the complete twin hearts shaped stone weir. Every year, a Penghu Stone Weir Festival (澎湖地區眾多石滬中) is held. This is a very big event for tourism in Penghu, together with the Penghu Gourmet Carnival.

=== Seven Beauties Tomb ===
Situated 500 meters southeast of Nanhu Port in Cimei Township, the Seven Beauties Tomb (Chinese: 七美人塚) is what remains of a well-known story of chastity. The story is also the origin of its place name. There are two stone tablets next to the Seven Beauties Tomb, on the left, is the Seven Beauties Tomb Stone established by the Japanese, and on the right is the Seven Beauties Song tablet, telling the story and origin of the Seven Beauties Tomb. In order for the spirits of the seven beauties to have a place to dwell, residents in Cimei built seven little houses next to the tomb, and placed seven sets of makeup in front of the tomb as offerings for them. Legend has it that during the Ming Dynasty, a group of pirates came ashore from the southern coast of Cimei. At that time, all the men on the island were out on the sea fishing, with the exception of children and old men. Women were also in the inland. Among them, there were seven ladies who were working nearby in the mountains, doing their laundry beside a water well when they were attacked by Japanese pirates. To avoid being raped by the pirates, the group decided to commit suicide by plunging into the water well. Afterwards, residents filled the water well with soil, and seven lushly catalpa bungei grew later on. In 1949, Mayor Liu Yanfu (劉燕夫) and General He Zhihao (何志浩) came to visit. General He was inspired by this story and wrote down a Seven Beauties Song on the spot, which was later carved onto the stone tablet; the song goes:

七美人兮百壁姿，抱貞拒絕兮死隨之，
英魂永寄孤芳樹，井上長春兮開滿枝

"the seven beauties are all innocent, and would rather die than be disgraced;
their brave spirits will forever be on the trees, which will bloom forever on the well."

The story of the seven beauties willing to die protecting their chastity was thus recorded, and the place was enlarged and became "Seven Beauties Chastity Garden" (七美人貞節園).

=== Little Taiwan ===
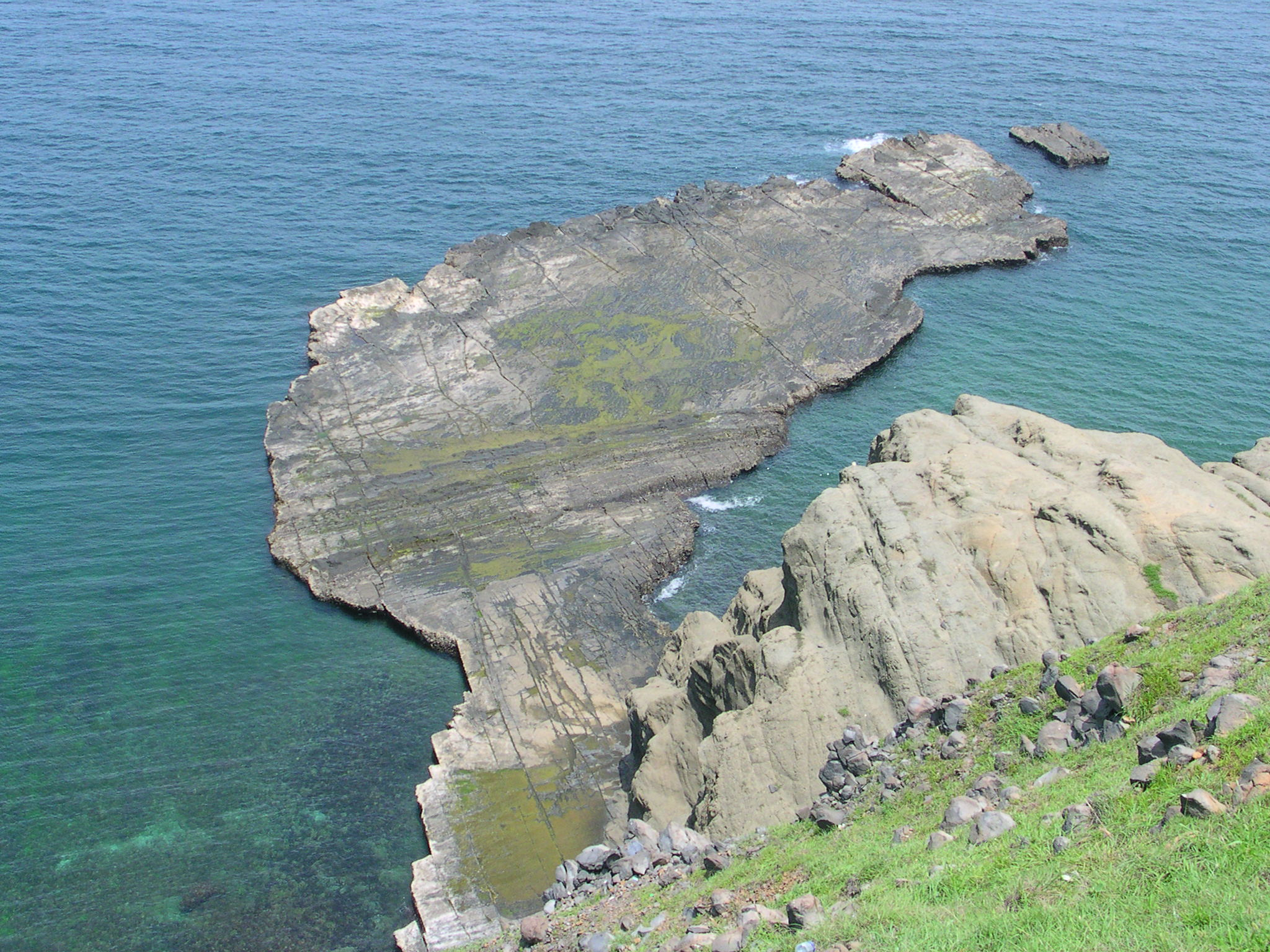
Little Taiwan

Little Taiwan sits in Donghu Village (東湖村) of Cimei Township. The place is called this way because looking down from a gazebo, visitors can see the result of years of wave erosion, forming an abrasion platform shaped like the island of Taiwan on a reduced scale, hence, it is called Cimei Little Taiwan (七美小台灣); there is also a rock shaped like Gueishan Island (龜山島) in the same spot: both structures look even more obvious when the tide is low.

=== Great Lion Scenic Area ===
Also located in Cimei, the Great Lion Scenic Area (Chinese: 大獅風景區) overlooks Longcheng (龍埕, "shaped like a dragon"). The name itself suggests what the place is like: standing high up on the hilltop looking down, visitors can actually see the body, the head and the tail of a dragon, even the foams splashed by the waves seem like white dragons swimming. Longcheng is an abrasion platform with pot holes and chessboard rocks.

=== Yueli Recreation Area (月鯉港遊憩區) ===
The Yueli Bay (月鯉灣) sits southeast of Cimei, forming a beautiful arc-shaped bay with white coral and a sand beach; this is the only sand beach on Cimei Island, along with rich recreational resources, and reef coral terrain formed by the coral reefs connected to the island; It is also a known place for diving activities, its corals and tropical fishes.

== Conservation vs development ==
Penghu is a favorite summer tourist destination which attracts thousands of weekenders. However, the Scenic Area is mostly visited during the summer: when the autumn gales begin to blow in October, the archipelago becomes deserted until April, when warmer weather seems to thaw the local tourism industry. The islands' climate has also a negative impact on its economy, as it is adverse to agriculture, and its isolated location rules out large-scale manufacturing development. Generations of Penghu residents have made their living from the sea, but over-fishing has severely depleted stocks and damaged the local fishing industry. Tourism has become the only way out of economic hardship. But for a county with a thinning population, which receives more than 50% percent of its annual budget from central government subsidies, a solution is needed. Several projects aimed at attracting tourists in winter have been tried with only limited success:

During July 2003, the Public Construction Commission and the Penghu National Scenic Area Administration under the Ministry of Transportation and Communication's Tourism Bureau agreed a development project in Jibei Islet (吉貝嶼): the more than NT$ 300 million investment would turn 22 hectares of land and 210 hectares of surrounding sea into an international recreational tourist spot. Shopping malls, restaurants, a luxury five-star hotel containing 350 rooms and parking lots would be established. Shortly after, the concerned authorities invited bids for the project, which aimed at boosting local tourism.

This project soon met with strong opposition from local green activists: "What we see here is a solution for an unsatisfactory situation that actually makes things worse," Chen Yufeng (陳玉峰), an ecologist, said. "Why does the government intend to make the islet a source of pollutants, which would affect not only surrounding waters but also neighboring countries?" he also added. He wasn't alone in his protest: Green Formosa Front chairman Wu Dongjie (吳東傑) visited officials of the National Scenic Area Administration, arguing that the bidding process should be delayed: "The environmental impact assessment has not been done at all," Wu said. However, and according to Hong Zhiguang (洪志光), an official of the administration, the project was well-designed and took into consideration environmental concerns: "We have set aside 10 hectares of land for scientific activities," Hong said. In addition, Hong said, the government and developers would jointly recycle all waste water and have all garbage either incinerated or buried at an existing landfill.

== Gambling controversy ==
Some local residents expressed their concern about the economic development of the archipelago, shortly after the China Airlines Flight 611 fell near the county. Following the crash of the China Airlines plane on 25 May 2002, the island's scenic area went through its quietest summer in years. This situation once again caused many to look to legalizing gambling as a way to attract tourists. Such a move met some opposition within the county: many tourism experts and local residents said that legalizing gambling was an irresponsible way to promote Penghu's tourism. In response to pressure from Penghu residents during 2000, the central government agreed to give between NT$ 100 million and NT$ 200 million to the Penghu National Scenic Area Administration Office to promote the islands' tourism. This budget, however, did little to develop Penghu or its tourism industry: no large-scale projects were completed and, despite numerous promotions, the plentiful tourism resources of Penghu failed to draw crowds. "The money was spent on constructing new harbors based on election concerns, which resulted in the many unnecessary harbors in Penghu now," said an anti-gambling activist in Penghu. There are now 67 harbors servicing Penghu's 97 villages. "The quality of these harbors is poor, and Penghu's coastline was seriously damaged by their construction," the same activist explained.

To promote the Scenic Area, the local government hosted swimming events, fireworks displays and parades of elaborately decorated vehicles. Such options met the opposition of some councilors: "These events can't distinguish Penghu's qualities at all," said Gao Zhipeng (高植澎), a Democratic Progressive Party councilor from Penghu County. "We even spent money on importing the fireworks and flowers from Taiwan". Another controversial side-effect of the tourism drive is the construction of large, international-standard hotels, which will probably be the setting for the casinos if the pro-gambling lobby has its way. During the year 2000, the Scenic Area administration confirmed there were five holiday resorts being planned. The biggest would occupy more than 11 hectares, but only two of them, would target families and international tourists with facilities such as a shopping mall, spa, nightclubs and casinos.

Supporters of legalizing gambling said it would attract investment to the islands and create job opportunities for local residents. They also argued that gambling in Penghu would bring more than NT$ 20 billion in tax revenues for the local government. Other benefits would apparently be free medical treatment and transportation, NT$ 10,000 a month for elderly residents and free education for children, although details of these benefits were not explained.

Critics argue that gambling would not only damage the islands' security and environment, but also increase the cost of living.

== See also ==
- South Penghu Marine National Park
- List of tourist attractions in Taiwan
- Republic of China
- Taiwan
