= Chimei lithic workshops =

Archaeological site in Penghu, Taiwan

The Chimei lithic workshops (Mandarin: 七美史前石器製造場考古遺址群; pinyin: qī měi shǐ qián shí qì zhì zào cháng kǎo gǔ yí zhǐ qún) were workshops for making stone tools in the mid-Neolithic period scattered around Chimei Island in Penghu County. These workshops are located at Nankang Village, Tunghu Village, and Hsihu Village in Chimei Township, Penghu County, and they can be dated back to 3,800 to 4,500 years ago.

== Geography and the history of study ==
The environments of the four prehistoric lithic workshops are as follows:

1. Nankang Prehistoric Lithic Workshop Site: It is located at the coastal roadside of Nankang Village in the south of Chimei Island. The site was found by Tsang Cheng-Hua in 1983, and four locations of dense accumulations of artifacts were identified. The first location is in the coastal area, which is south of the Tomb of the Seven Beauties and 200 meters to the west of Chimei Lighthouse. Tsang Cheng-Hua et al. once conducted sampling and trial excavation here. The second location is 100 meters away from the southwest of the Tomb, which is west of the first location. The third location is surrounding and east of the stone tower, right behind the Tomb. The fourth location is on the highland facing the ocean and on the opposite side of the sea patrol office in southeast Nankang Village.
2. Tunghu Prehistoric Lithic Workshop Site: It was found by Tsang Cheng-Hua et al. in 2000 and is located at the east of Chimei Island by the cliff of Dachiniumuping, Tunghu Village, which is the cliff south of the tourism destination of “Little Taiwan.”
3. Hsipeiwan Prehistoric Lithic Workshop Site: It was found by Tsang Cheng-Hua et al. in 2000 and is located at the north of Chimei Island on the cliff north of the Hsihu settlement.
4. Hsihu Prehistoric Lithic Workshop Site: It was found by Tsang Cheng-Hua when he was carrying out the survey and supplementation of the site. It’s located on the cliff in the northwest of the Hsihu settlement and roadside highland, 100 meters away from the NNW direction of the Second Landfill.

== Research results ==
According to the research for the stone artifacts by Tsang Cheng-Hua and Hung Hsiao-Chun, the artifacts collected from the surface of the workshops include 8 categories: nodule, core, flake, blank, pre-form, broken finished stone tool, pebble tool, and the tool for cutting and polishing stones

The manufacture of stone tools was studied and reconstructed, which includes six steps: removing cores from the country rock; making the target flakes from the cores; extracting the blanks; making the pre-forms; polishing the pre-forms; and then creating the tool body or cutting edge.

Aside from the large amounts of lithics in the workshops, no other cultural remains or complete lithics have been found, reflecting their functions as sites for stone mining and preparation works for lithic manufacturing.

As for the trade across the sea in southwestern Taiwan, in the Japanese Colonial Era, Kokubu Naoichi first proposed that there were exchanges between Penghu and the southwestern coasts of Taiwan. Based on the similar corded pottery unearthed at Liangwenkang site in Penghu, and Taotsiyuan site in Kaohsiung, as well as the finding of lithics made of basalt in Kaohsiung, it’s suggested that those lithic materials were from the Penghu Isles. In 2000, Rolett et al. selected five basalt lithics unearthed or collected from Niuchoutzi Culture and Fengpitou site for X-ray fluorescence (XRF) analysis. The study shows that there were five lithics made of similar alkaline basalts, and data analysis points out that the compositions of the lithic samples match the geological data in Penghu. Therefore, it’s suggested that the basalt stone tools in southwestern Taiwan were from the Penghu Isles. Based on these results, the basalt stone tools in southwestern Taiwan may have been from the prehistoric lithic workshops at Chimei Island.
