= Qimei Power Plant =

Power plant in Qimei, Penghu, Taiwan

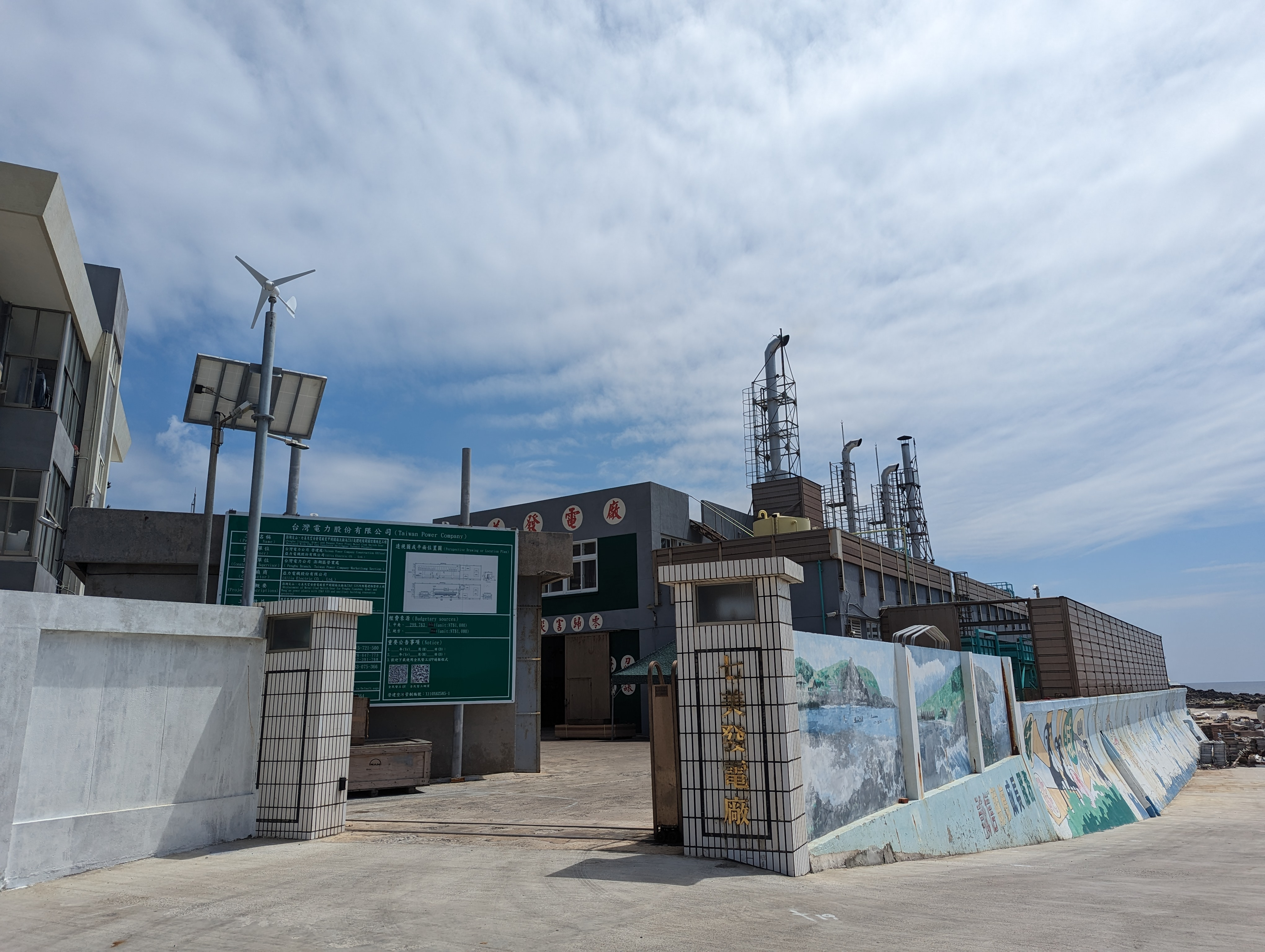
- Official name: 七美發電廠
- Country: Taiwan
- Location: Nangang, Cimei, Penghu
- Coordinates: 23°11′37.5″N 119°25′19.8″E
- Status: Operational
- Commission date: 23 July 1998 (unit 1); 30 June 2006 (unit 2); 6 August 2005 (unit 3); 1 July 2001 (unit 4)
- Owner: Taipower
- Operator: Taipower

Thermal power station
- Primary fuel: Diesel fuel

Power generation
- Units operational: 4 × 1,000 kW

External links
- Commons: Related media on Commons

The Qimei Power Plant (Chinese: 七美發電廠; pinyin: Qīměi Fādiànchǎng) is a fuel-fired power plant in Nangang Village, Cimei Township, Penghu County, Taiwan. It is the only power plant on Cimei Island.

== History ==
On 20 June 1974, Taiwan Power Company took over a power plant currently operating on the island with a capacity of 2x120 kW. The plant only powered up to a maximum 10 hours per day only. In 1978, the power plant was rebuilt at the current site with a generation capacity of 500 kW using diesel engine. The plant was then able to supply around 13–16 hours of electricity per day to the local residents. In 1981, three units of 500 kW generator were added to the plant to increase its generation capacity. Starting 1 February 1984, the power plant could supply electricity to the local residents for 24 hours a day. Over the years due to the growing demand, the installed 4 units of 500 kW generator became insufficient to keep supplying electricity. Thus, in 1998, 2001 and 2006, the power plant was overhauled to replace its generator from 500 kW to 1,000 kW capacity.

== See also ==
- List of power stations in Taiwan
- Electricity sector in Taiwan
