= Qimei Lighthouse =

Lighthouse in Qimei, Penghu, Taiwan

Qimei Lightouse Chimeiyu Qimei Yu Chi Mei Yu
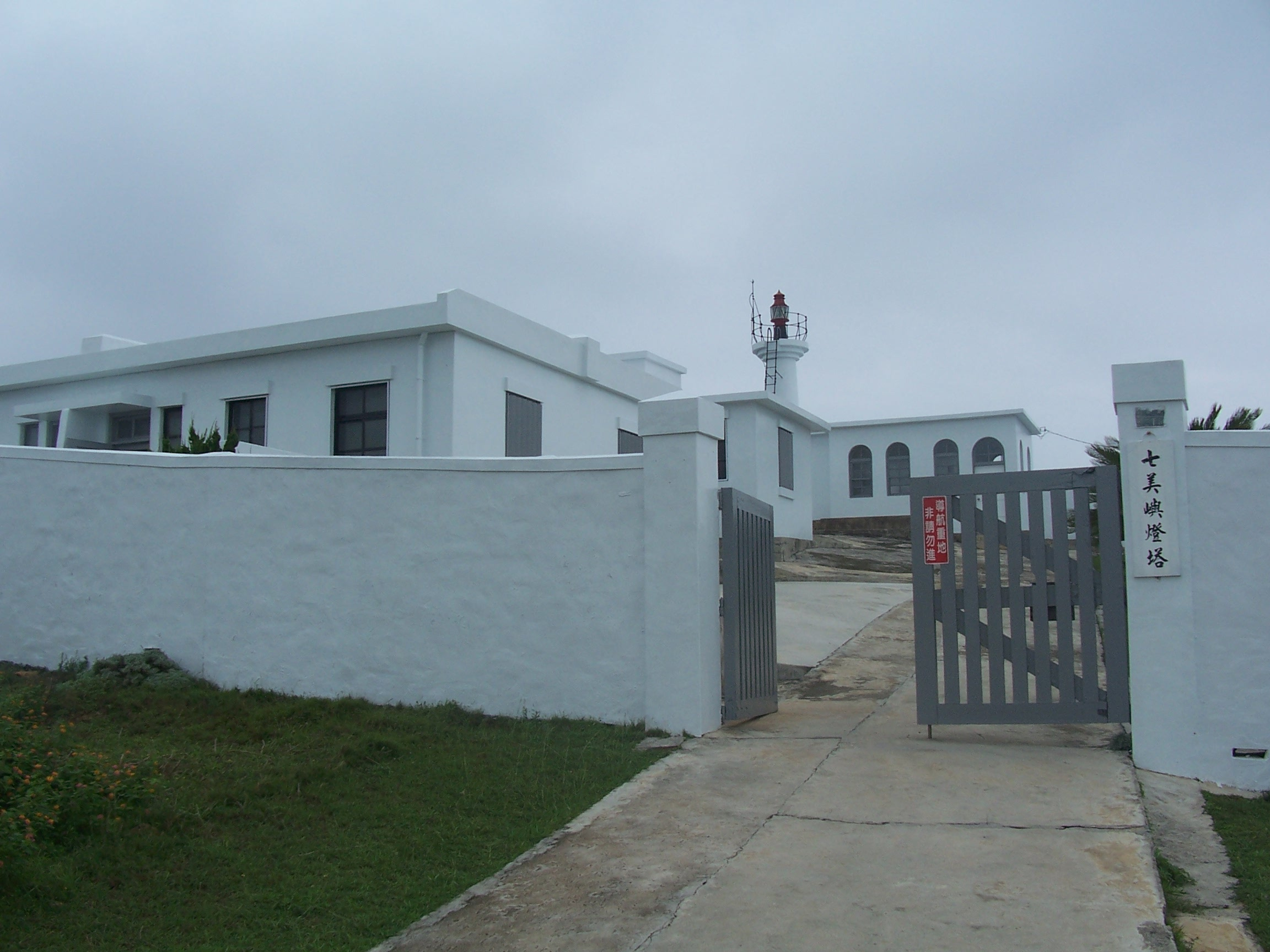
- Qimei Lighthouse
- Location: Qimei, Penghu, Taiwan
- Coordinates: 23.190050°N 119.428055°E

Tower
- Constructed: 1939 (first)
- Construction: concrete mast
- Height: 8.3 metres (27 ft)
- Shape: cylindrical mast on a one-storey keeper’s house with balcony and light
- Markings: white tower, red light
- Power source: mains electricity
- Operator: Maritime and Port Bureau

Light
- First lit: 1965 (current)
- Focal height: 40.8 metres (134 ft)
- Range: 11.3 nautical miles (20.9 km; 13.0 mi)
- Characteristic: Fl (2) W 10s.

The Qimei Lighthouse / Cimei Lighthouse (traditional Chinese: 七美嶼燈塔; simplified Chinese: 七美屿灯塔; Hanyu Pinyin: Qīměi Yǔ Dēngtǎ; Tongyong Pinyin: Ciměi Yǔ Dengtǎ) is a lighthouse in Qimei / Cimei Township, Penghu County, Taiwan.

== History ==
The lighthouse was built in 1939. It was the last lighthouse built by the Japanese government. Originally, it uses acetylene for its power before switching to electricity in 1964. The lighthouse will be opened for public at the end of 2015.

== Technical details ==
The lighthouse has focal plane of 41 meters, in which two white flashes every 10 seconds. The building structure has an 8-meter concrete post sitting atop of 1-story concrete keeper's house. Due to its location at the southern tip of Qimei Island, the lighthouse is used not only for navigation, but also for fishery resources.

== See also ==
- List of tourist attractions in Taiwan
- List of lighthouses in Taiwan
