= Illegal sand trade =

The illegal trade or black market of sand, which fulfills demand caused by increased construction worldwide, pulls in anywhere between $200B and $350B a year.

== Motivations ==
The global construction boom has created a demand for sand, the chief ingredient for making concrete. However, sand mining has been restricted or banned in many places due to environmental concerns. These factors have contributed to the illegal trade of sand, which has become lucrative.

== Sand mafias ==
Due to the high price point which sand can fetch on the illegal market, some mafias and gangs have organized around the illegal sand trade. These groups are involved in smuggling, illegal activities, and sometimes violence. Such groups are often referred to as the sand mafia.

Countries affected by sand mafias or other violence related to the illegal sand trade include, but are not limited to, Algeria, Brazil, Colombia, The Gambia, Ghana, India, Kenya, Mexico, Morocco, and Nigeria.

== Illegal mining ==
Sand is usually mined by companies and sold legally, but the construction boom has led to small illegal gangs mining and selling sand illegally. Illegal mining is performed both by sand mafias and by locals.

Between 1990 and 2021, illegal mining was recorded in 35 African countries. Illegal mining has also been recorded in the Mekong Delta of Vietnam. In Morocco, approximately half of the sand used in local construction annually is illegally mined.

== See also ==
- Sand smuggling in Southeast Asia
- Sand theft
