= Qimei Reservoir =

Reservoir in Qimei, Penghu, Taiwan

- Location within Taiwan
- Coordinates: 23.2111°N 119.4339°E
- Purpose: public water supply
- Construction began: 1 June 1990

Qimei Reservoir (traditional Chinese: 七美水庫; simplified Chinese: 七美水库; pinyin: Qīměi shuǐkù), also known as Ch'i-mei Reservoir, is a reservoir located in Donghu Village, Qimei Township, Penghu County. It is the only reservoir and the main source of water on Qimei Island.

The construction of the Qimei Reservoir started on 1 June 1990 and was completed on 1 October 1991. It has a catchment area of 1.14 square kilometers and a designed effective water storage capacity of about 230,000 cubic meters.

== See also ==
- List of dams and reservoirs in Taiwan
