= Little Taiwan =

Wave-cut platform in Qimei, Penghu, Taiwan

Little Taiwan 小臺灣
- Wave-cut platform
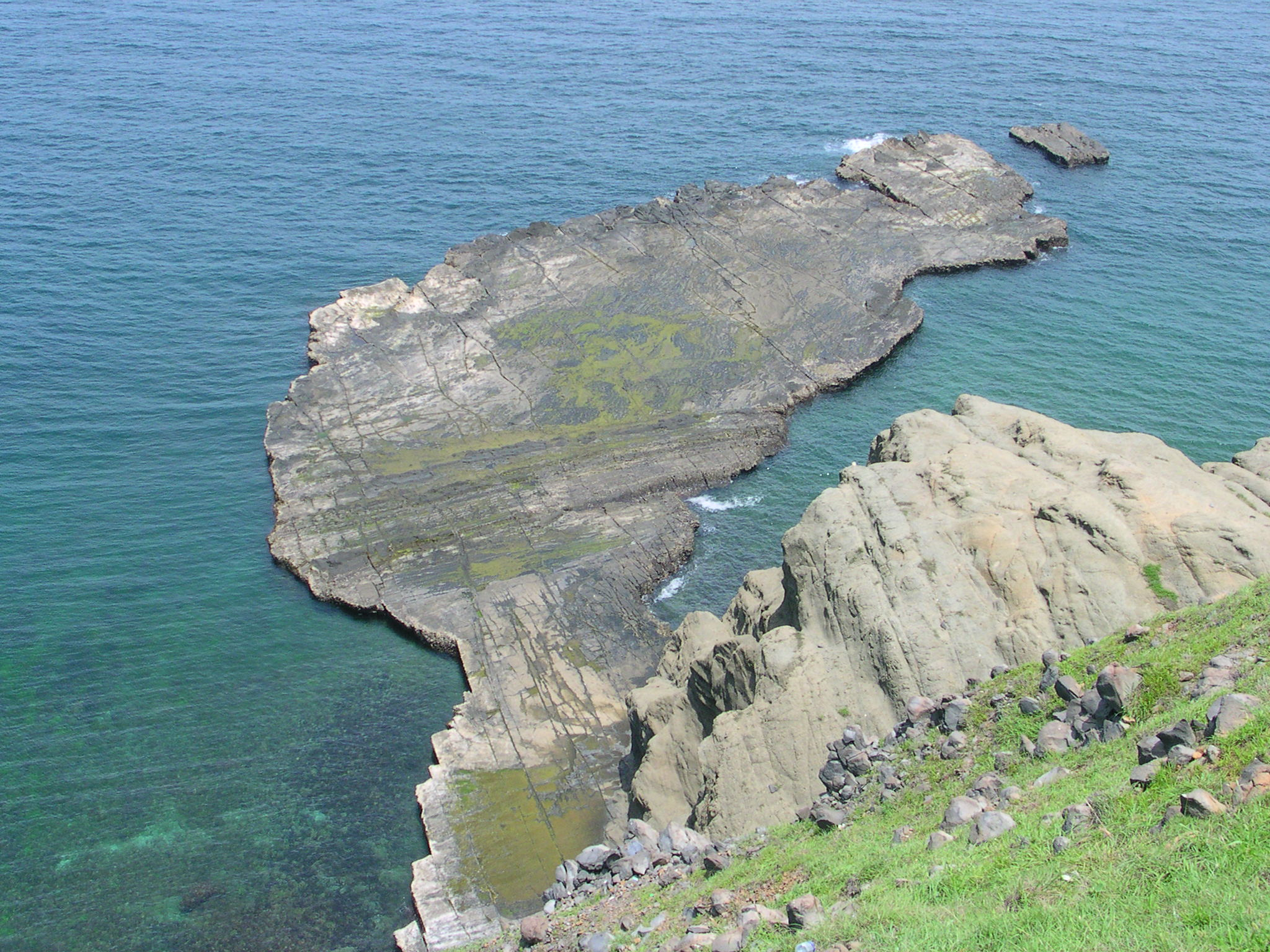

- Location within Taiwan
- Coordinates: 23.208164°N 119.443810°E
- Location: Cimei, Penghu, Taiwan

Little Taiwan (traditional Chinese: 小臺灣; simplified Chinese: 小台湾; pinyin: Xiǎo Táiwān) is a wave-cut platform in Cimei Township, Penghu County, Taiwan.

Visible at low tide, the platform has the shape of Taiwan. Together with the Double-Heart of Stacked Stones it is a tourist attraction on the island of Cimei.

== See also ==
- List of tourist attractions in Taiwan
