= Wangan Green Turtle Tourism and Conservation Center =

Zoo in Wangan, Penghu, Taiwan

Wangan Green Turtle Tourism and Conservation Center 望安綠蠵龜觀光保育中心
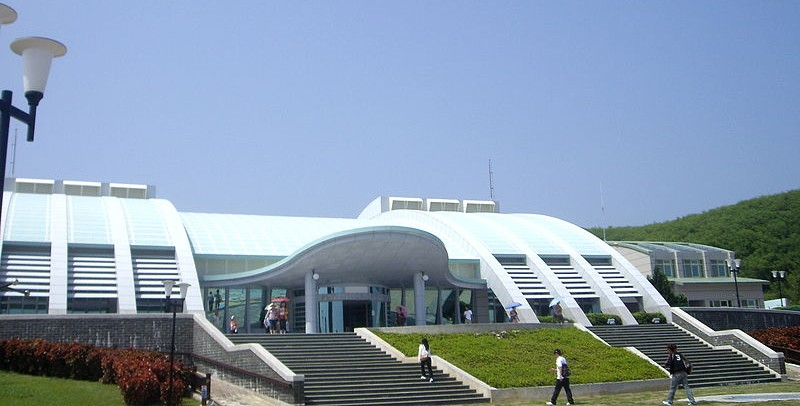
- Interactive map of Wangan Green Turtle Tourism and Conservation Center 望安綠蠵龜觀光保育中心
- 24°04′07″N 120°56′40″E
- Date opening: 1997
- Location: Wangan, Penghu, Taiwan

The Wangan Green Turtle Tourism and Conservation Center (traditional Chinese: 望安綠蠵龜觀光保育中心; simplified Chinese: 望安绿蠵龟观光保育中心; pinyin: Wàng'ān Lǜxīguī Guānguāng Bǎoyù Zhōngxīn) is a conservation center for green sea turtles in Tungan Village, Wangan Township, Penghu County, Taiwan.

== History ==
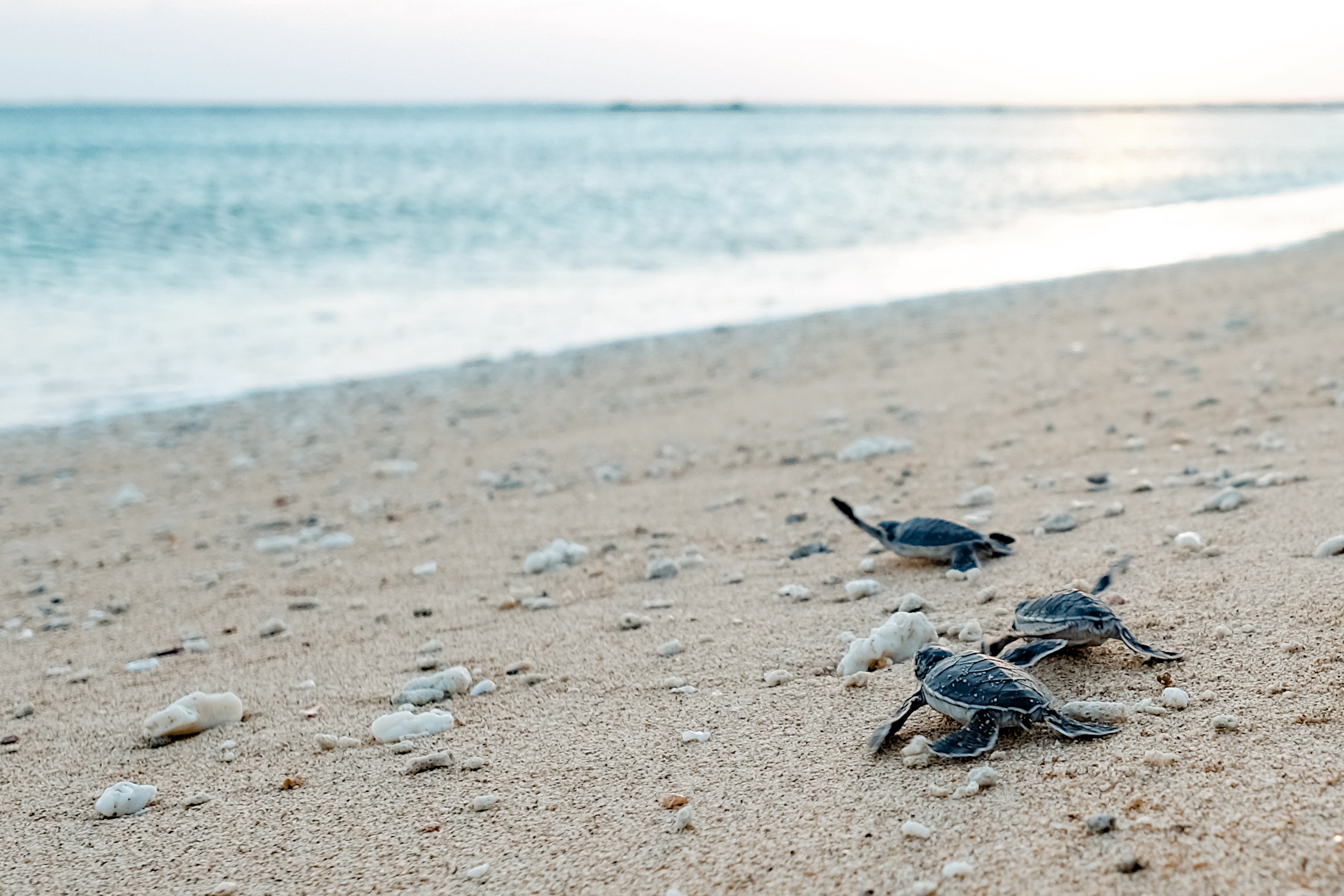
Green turtle hatchlings

The center was set up in 1997. Up to 2015, the center has taken care of more than 250 rescued sea turtles, in which 150 of them have then been released back to the sea.

== Architecture ==
The center was constructed with a shape of a turtle.

== Exhibitions ==
The center exhibits the natural ecology in Wangan and exhibitions on turtles, environment and ecology. It often conduct sea turtle release events and sea turtle ecological conservation promotion.

== See also ==
- List of tourist attractions in Taiwan
