= Qimei =

Cimei Township 七美鄉 Qimei, Chimei, Ta Yu, Ō-shima
- Rural township
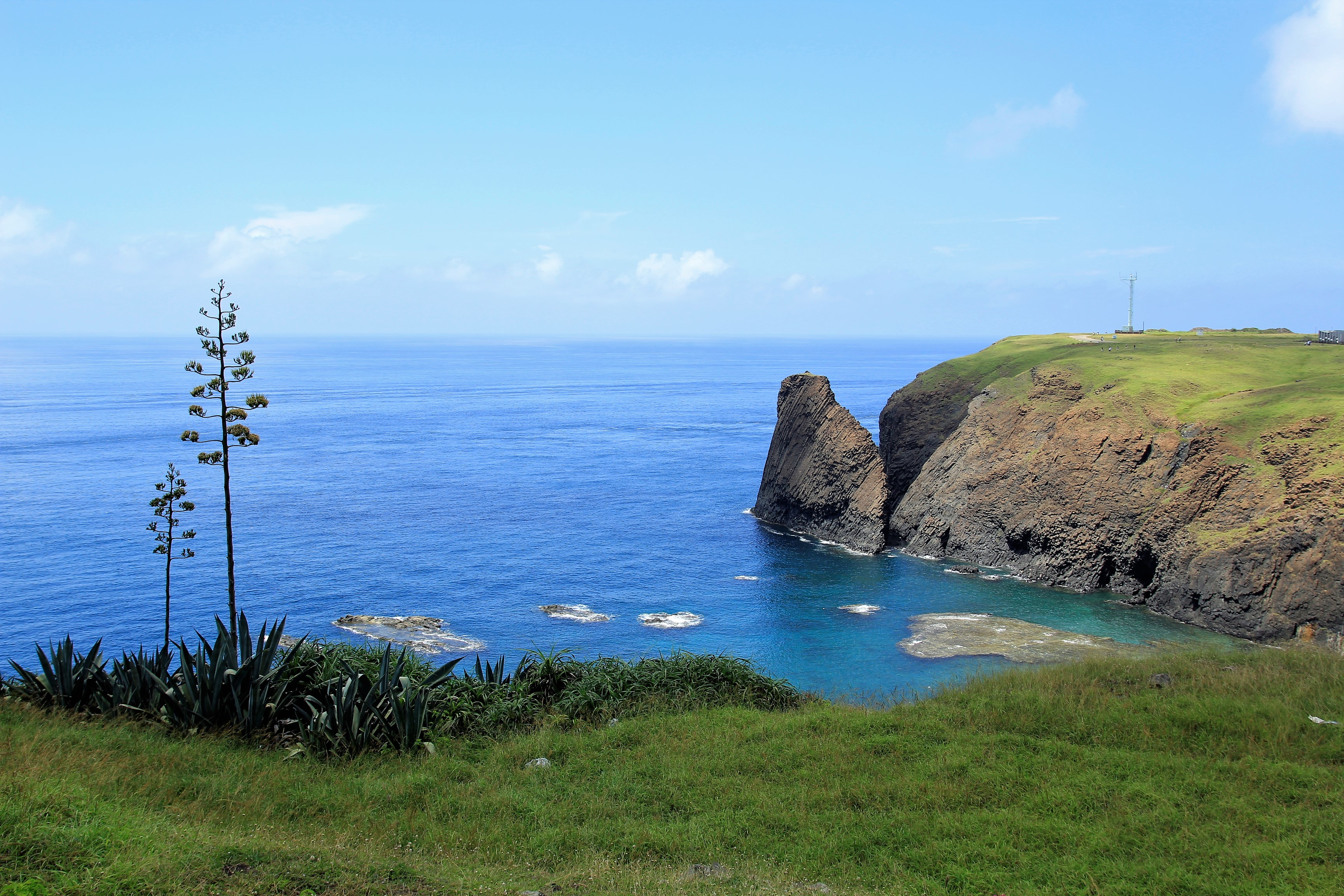

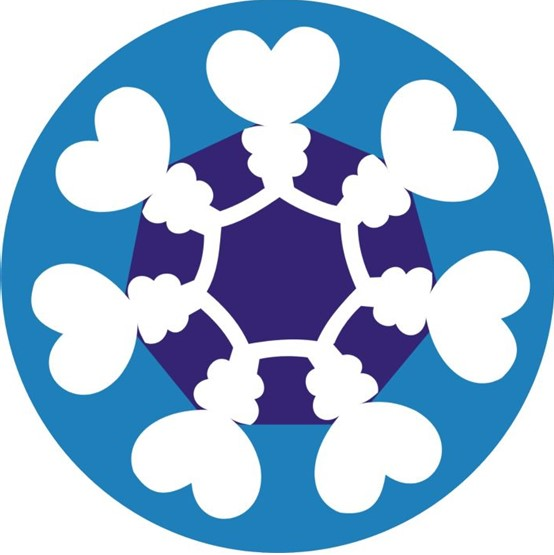
- Seal

- Cimei Township in Penghu County
- Coordinates: 23°12′29″N 119°25′43″E
- Country: Republic of China (Taiwan)
- County: (Penghu County) Penghu
- Rural villages (村): 6

Government
  - Mayor (鄉長): Lu Chi-Chun (呂啓俊)

Area
  - Total: 6.99 km^{2} (2.70 sq mi)

Population (June 2026)
  - Total: 3,981
  - Density: 570/km^{2} (1,480/sq mi)
- Time zone: UTC+8 (National Standard Time)
- Postal code: 883
- Website: www.chimi.gov.tw/en (in English)

Cimei Township (Qimei Township, Chimei Township) (Chinese: 七美鄉; Hanyu Pinyin: Qīměi Xiāng; Tongyong Pinyin: Ciměi Siang; Wade–Giles: Chʻi^{1}-mei^{3} Hsiang^{1}; Pe̍h-ōe-jī: Chhit-bí-hiong; lit. 'township of the island of the seven beauties') is a rural township in Penghu County, Taiwan. The island is the fifth largest in Penghu and the southernmost island in the group. It is the smallest township in Penghu County.

== History ==
Archaeological evidence of prehistoric cultures dating back 4500 years before present was found in Nangang Village in 1983. There were residents on the island during the Ming dynasty.

The island came under Qing control in 1683 after the Battle of Penghu. In the early Qing, the island was known as "South Island" (南嶼) and "Southern Big Island" (南大嶼). The residents of the island were moved to nearby Wang-an and the island was declared permanently off-limits for human habitation. The oldest temple on the island was established in 1706. By the end of the Qing period, the island was generally referred to as "Big Island" (大嶼). The island was ceded to Japan in 1895.

Japan took control of the area during the Pescadores Campaign (1895). During Japanese rule, the island was a She (社) under Mōan (望安庄; now Wangan) called Ō-shima (大嶼). The Qimei Lighthouse was constructed in 1939, the final lighthouse built in Taiwan during Japanese rule. In 1944, the area was administered as Taisho Village (大嶼庄), Mōan Subprefecture (望安支廳), Hōko Prefecture.

The handover of Taiwan to the Republic of China occurred in 1945. Ta Hsü Township (Dayu; 大嶼鄉) was established on December 11, 1945. The island and township were renamed "Chimei/Cimei/Qimei" in 1949 to commemorate a legend (七美人塚) from the Ming dynasty, in which seven women committed suicide when pirates raided the island. The name also connotes seven beautiful things as the island's tourist attractions: the scenery, the seawater, local products, people's hearts, the geology, the architecture, and the history.

In 1966, President Chiang Kai-shek conducted an inspection of the island.

In 1986, Cimei was severely affected by Typhoon Wayne.

On April 20, 2002, President Chen Shui-bian visited the island and delivered remarks on healthcare services in the area.

On October 24, 2019, at around 8 AM, two sand smuggling ships from China with a total crew of twenty-eight were apprehended in the waters southwest of the township.

== Geography ==
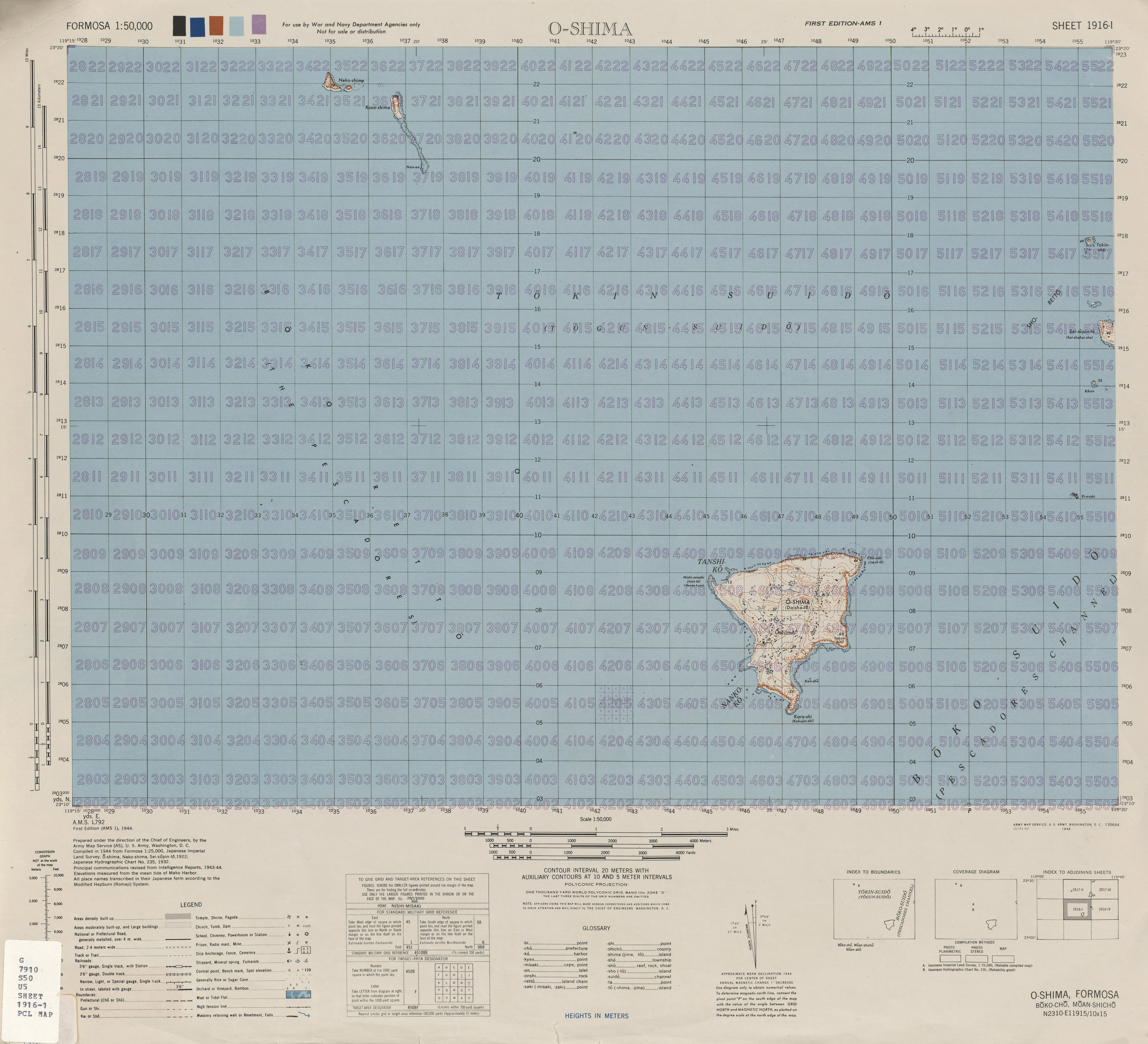
Map of Cimei (labeled as Ō-SHIMA (Daisho-tō)) and surrounding areas (1944)

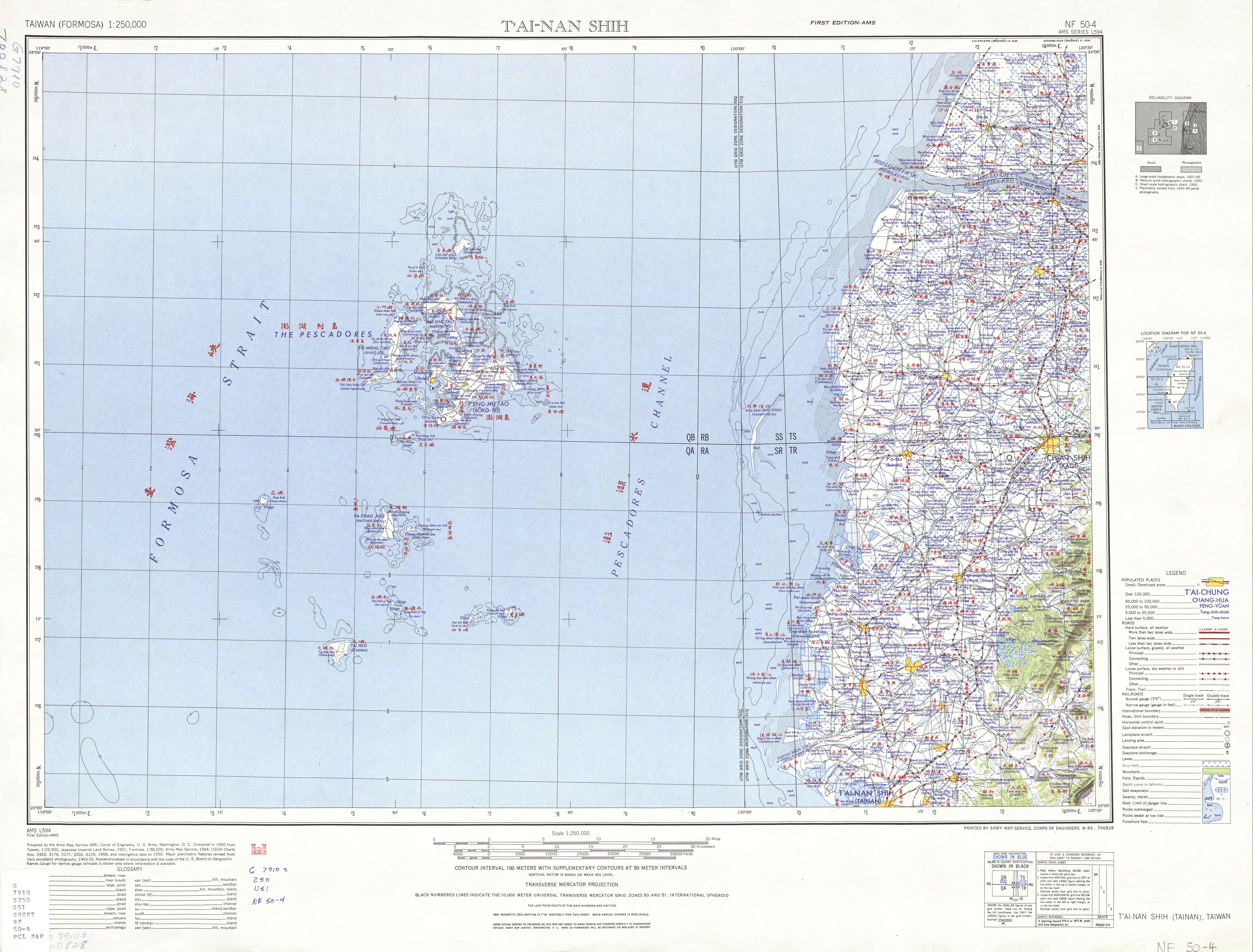
Map including Cimei (labeled as TA HSÜ (Ō-SHIMA) 大嶼) (1950)

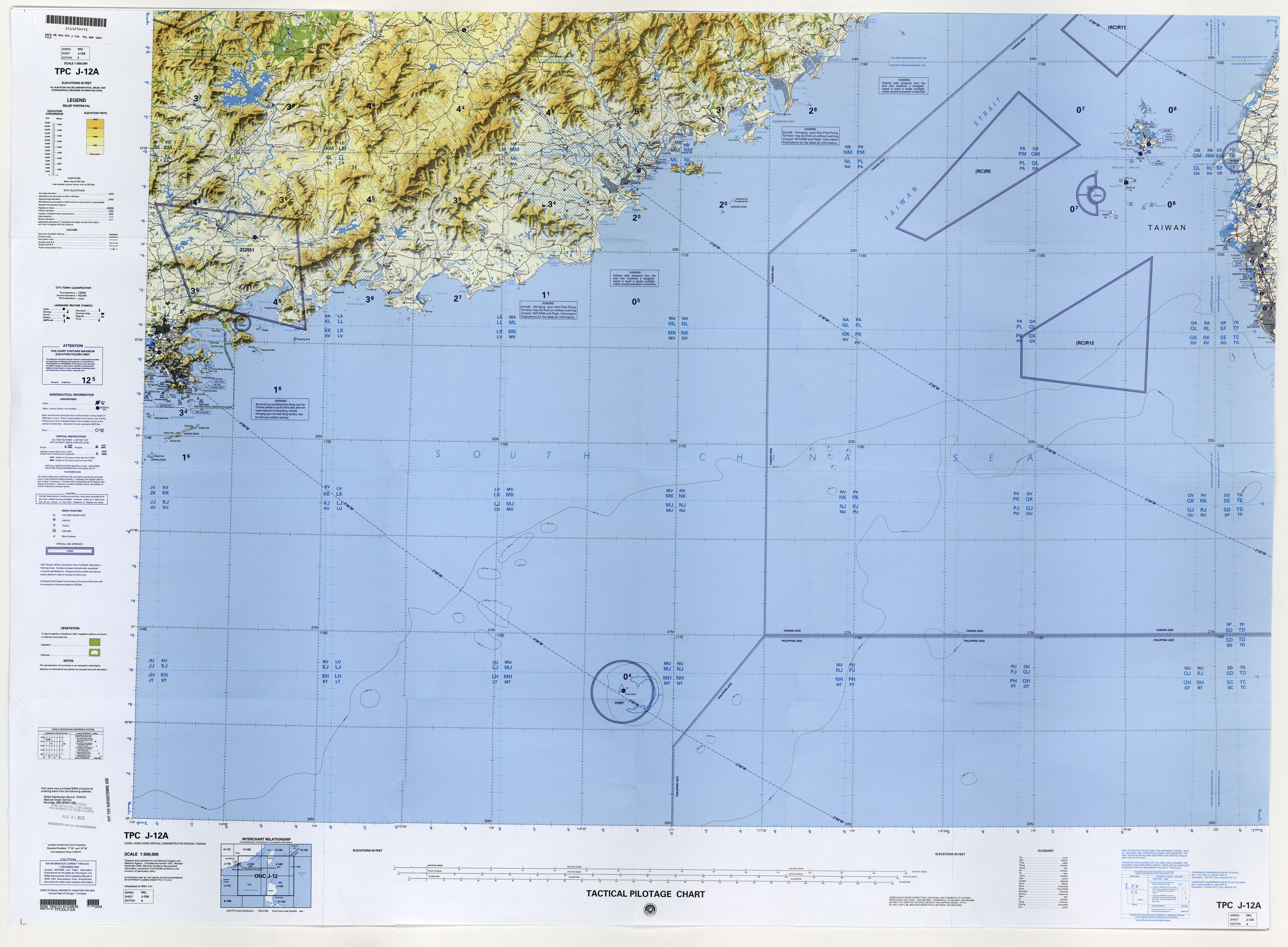
Map including Cimei (labeled as CHIMEI) (NIMA; comp. 1974, rev. 2000)

Cimei is 6.99 km^{2} in area with a coastline of 14.4 kilometers and a population of about 3,909 people. Composed mostly of basalt formations, the island is the fifth largest island in the Penghu Archipelago.

== Infrastructure ==
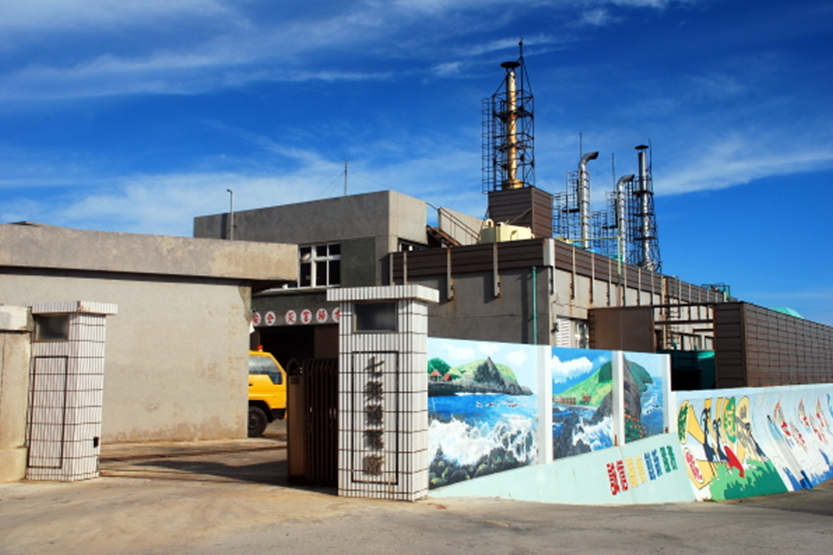
Qimei Power Plant

- Qimei Power Plant
- Qimei Reservoir

== Administrative divisions ==
The township includes six rural villages:

- Donghu/Tunghu Village (東湖村)
- Sihu/Xihu Village (西湖村)
- Jhonghe/Zhonghe Village (中和村)
- Pinghe Village (平和村)
- Haifong/Haifeng Village (海豐村)
- Nangang Village (南港村)

== Tourist attractions ==
- Double-Heart of Stacked Stones
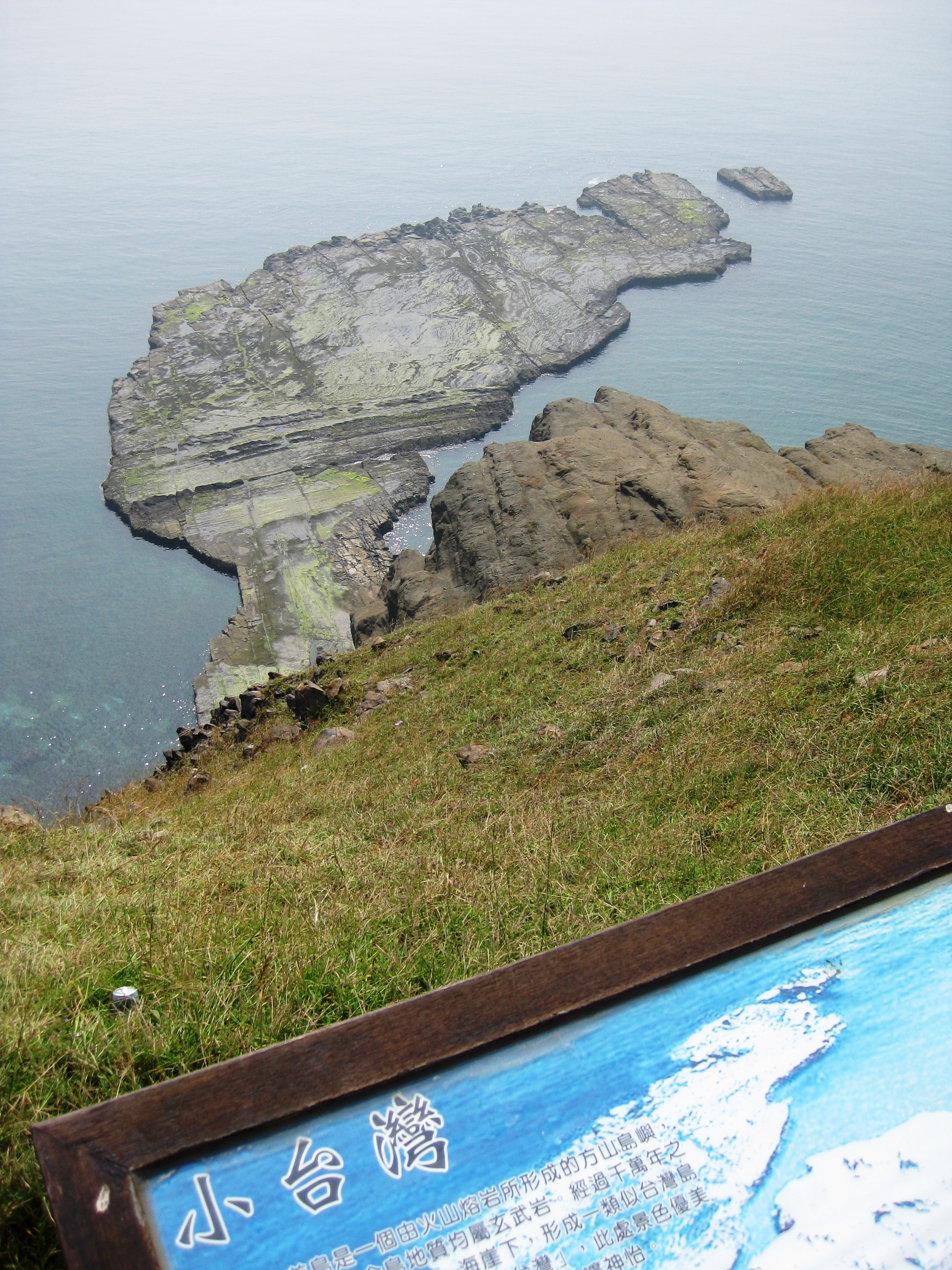
- Little Taiwan
  Little Taiwan
- Qimei Lighthouse

== Transportation ==
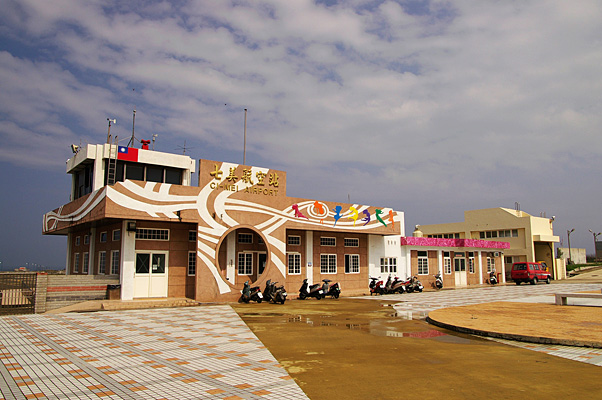
Qimei Airport

- Qimei Airport

== Education ==
There are two schools in Qimei:

- Chi-Mei Junior High School (澎湖縣立七美國民中學)
- Cimei Primary School (澎湖縣立七美國民小學)
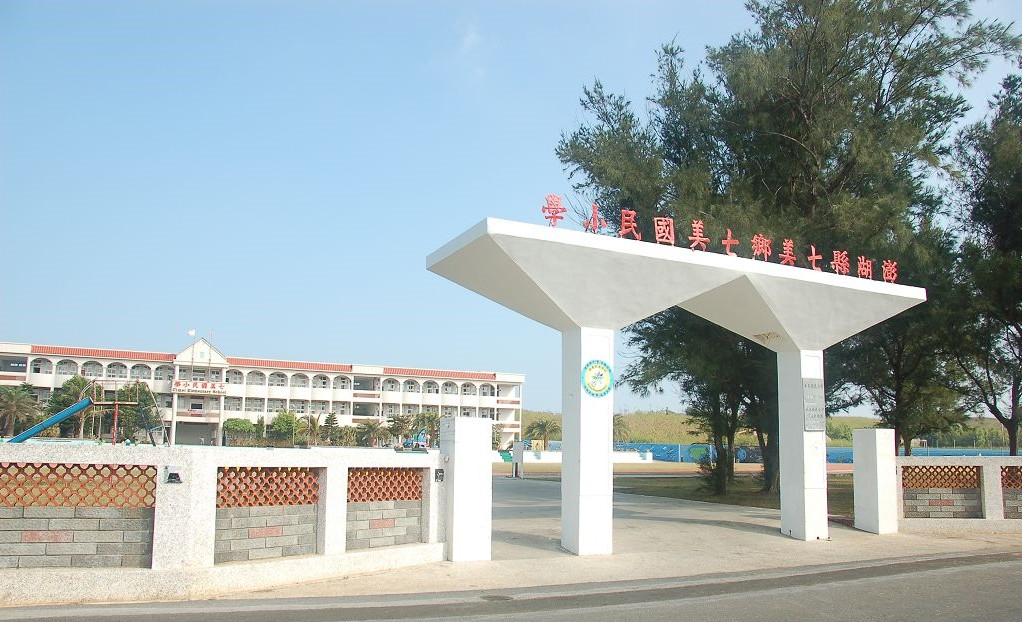
Cimei Primary School

== See also ==
- List of islands of the Republic of China
- Wang-an
