= Sand smuggling in Southeast Asia =

Environmental crime

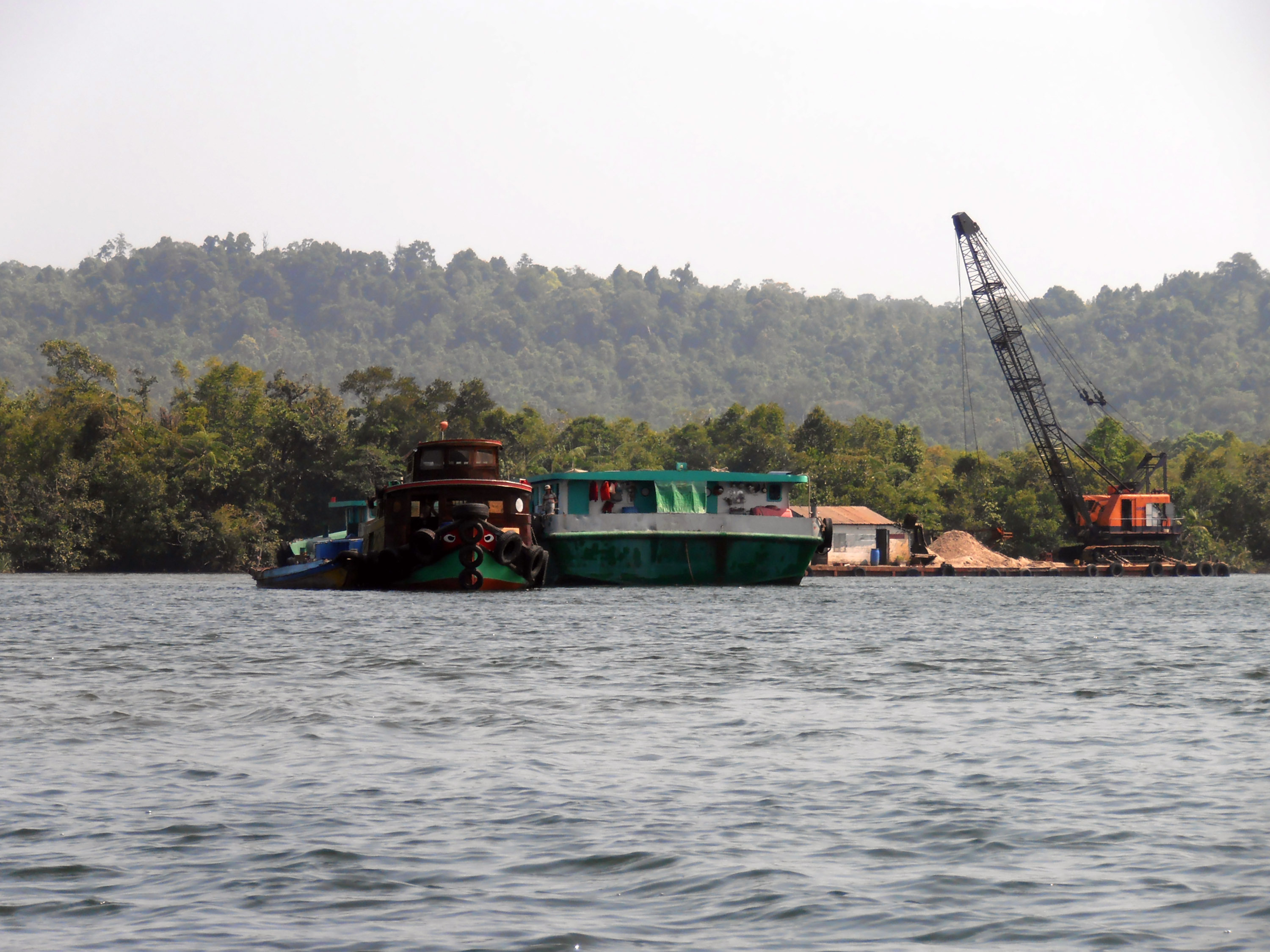
Unauthorized sand mining at the Tatai River in the Koh Kong Conservation Corridor, Cambodia 2012

Sand smuggling is the cross-border environmental crime of illegal transportation of often illegally extracted natural sand and gravel. While sand smuggling and illegal mining are global concerns, they are especially acute in Asia, where continuing urbanization and the region's large construction boom are driving the increasing demand for sand. The consequences of excessive sand mining and smuggling, which are strongly connected, range from environmental degradation to geopolitical tension.

Illegal sand smuggling and extraction, despite the importance of the resource, remain under-researched and for the most part hidden threats because they often occur in isolated places. The issue is rarely addressed in scientific research and policy forums. Instead, it is the media and non-governmental organizations that are at the forefront of exposing environmental crimes and actions of corruption in the sand industry.

== The importance and global use of sand ==
Sand is used in a wide variety of fields, but 90 percent of the material is used in the construction industry, which is heavily dependent on the resource because concrete is 75 percent sand.

Sand and gravel are the world's most mined materials, but despite their importance it is not known how much sand is consumed annually. Therefore, revenue estimates of the sand mining industry vary greatly. As a natural and widely available common-pool resource, sand is hard to regulate which makes the monitoring of mining extremely difficult. Especially in certain developing countries, reliable data is only available for recent years.

The estimate of sand consumption most commonly used comes from the United Nations Development Programme, which uses the production of cement in 150 countries to calculate the global use of sand, and reports that 25.9 to 29.6 billion tonnes of sand are mined annually solely for cement. Since this does not include sand used for land reclamation and other industry, total global annual use is estimated to be around 40 billion tonnes per year. Because this number does not account for hydraulic fracturing and beach nourishment, global sand extraction and use might still be underestimated.

This enormous demand of sand is mostly due to economic growth in South East Asia, especially in China and Singapore. It has transformed sand from a traditionally local product into a major commodity in international trade.

== Prevalence of sand smuggling ==
Sand mining without licences or permits is illegal in most countries, but the sand extraction industry is riddled with corruption and scandals. Because the growing demand threatens to outgrow legal sources sand has drastically increased in value. The average price of a tonne of sand imported to Singapore increased from US$3 in 1995 to US$190 in 2005. Additionally, export bans contribute to the rising prices and therefore drive up black market profits. This increases the incentive for smuggling and allows criminal syndicates to maintain tighter control of sand smuggling which thrives consequently.

The issue of illicit sand mining is one that affects underdeveloped and developing nations more than others. The reasons for that are the weakness of government policies in these countries and a lack of support from authorities to stop the malpractices because corruption is preventing them from doing so. Therefore, numbers on the extent of sand smuggling are likely to be misrepresentative of reality.

The thriving smuggling is hurting the affected countries economically. Because up to 300 million m^{3} of sand was being smuggled out of Indonesia every year the country was losing about US$450 million a year due to the illegal sand mining activity in the Riau Islands province.

== Singapore’s role ==
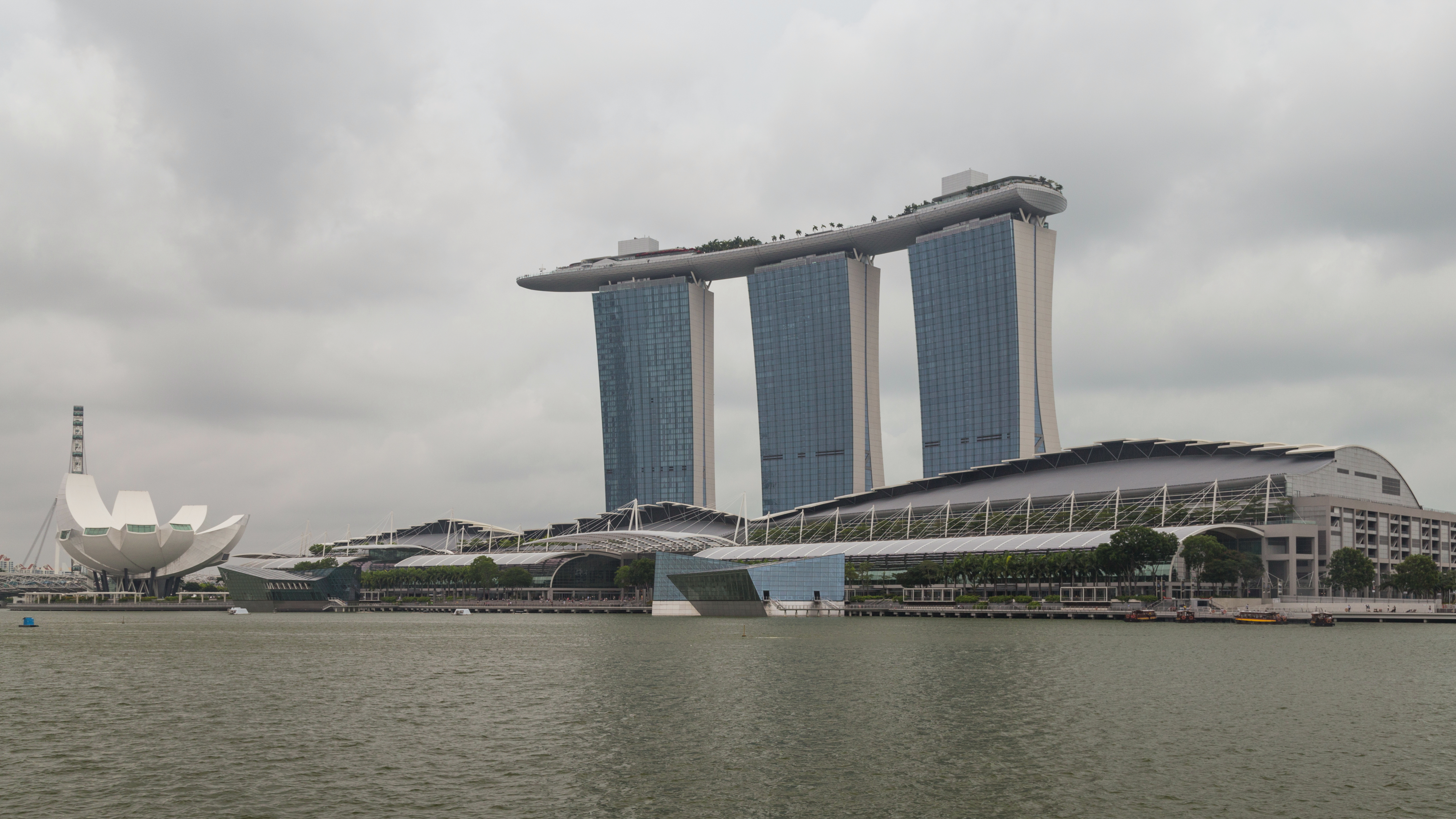
Singapore's district Marina Bay was built on reclaimed land

Singapore has become the world's largest sand importer due to its land reclamation activities. To account for its drastic economic and demographic growth the country has increased its land mass by 20 percent in the last 40 years. The land reclamation is ongoing, and it has been estimated that Singapore will need an additional 1.8 billion m^{3} of sand over the next seven to eight years for its plans to eventually increase its surface area by a total of 30 percent compared to its original size.

Because the island state has already exhausted its domestic sand resources it imports sand from its surrounding neighbours. Most of this sand was obtained from the beaches of Malaysia, Indonesia, and Vietnam. But because they were burdening the social and economic costs that resulted from sand extraction Singapore's major sand suppliers successively prohibited sand exports to the island. Malaysia banned sand exports to Singapore in 1997, Indonesia banned them in 2007, and Vietnam first limited the exports in 2008 and banned them in 2009. This prompted the country to expand its supplier relations to Myanmar, the Philippines, and Bangladesh while allegedly continuing to illegally smuggle sand from Indonesia, Malaysia, and Vietnam.

In Cambodia, which also had banned sand exports, official sand export data do not match the equivalent sand import data of Singapore which has raised the concern that the country is engaged in large scale sand smuggling to Singapore. Sand at a retail value of US$248 million was shipped illegal from Cambodia to Singapore. Similar to this, Singaporean statistics show sand imports from Malaysia of 3 million tonnes in 2008, while Malaysian statistics report 133 million tonnes of sand exports to Singapore for the same year. An estimated 600 million tonnes of sand illegally leave Indonesia yearly heading for Singapore.

Government officials of both Cambodia and Singapore are suspected to be involved in the illegal activities since companies have been given licences to dredge in protected areas. Singapore claims that sand is imported on a commercial basis and that officials are not involved in the sand supply, but Global Witness claims that it found evidence that government agencies are indeed procuring sand.

== Methods of sand smuggling ==
Illegal mining can take place on different scales. It can be as simple as getting a cart to a beach and filling it up with sand with shovels and selling it to cement makers. But smugglers can also use small barges or bigger ships equipped with large dredging machinery.

The extraction often occurs during night under the cover of darkness. The remoteness of dredging sites makes stealing sand relatively risk free and allows the smugglers to use loud and heavy machinery. Especially in Indonesia there are thousands of miles of unguarded coastlines and the proximity to Singapore allows the smugglers to reach their destination quickly.

To unload the cargo, smugglers use forged documents to sell the sand to international brokers. Smugglers can use simple tricks to get around legal regulation. When Indonesia first banned the exports of marine sand in 2003 exporting companies labelled marine sand as coastal or land sand in order to keep exporting the resource. Dredging companies allegedly have close ties with naval officers and government officials to protect them from legal action. Greenpeace Indonesia claimed that smugglers had no problem getting their exports into Singapore and were rarely intercepted by customs boats or the navy.

Likewise, Malaysia is also troubled by illegal sand shipments to Singapore. A Malaysian dredging company with a licence to transport sand within the country from dredging sites to the mainland was working about 50 miles inland from the Singapore Strait. The transport route crossed the Malaysia-Singapore border, but instead of passing through Singaporean waters the barges stopped at a port in Singapore, presented forged paperwork, and unloaded the extracted sand.

These practices are facilitated by wide-ranging corruption in Malaysia. In 2010 the Malaysian Anti-Corruption Commission (MACC) arrested 34 officials and businessmen in a so-called “sex-for-sand” scandal. They were accused of accepting bribes of cash and sex from prostitutes in exchange for lucrative sand-dredging permits.

In addition to corruption, smugglers don't shy away from coercion to facilitate their activities. In Cambodia, villagers have been attacked and killed during forced evictions from areas of increased sand extraction, threatening of law enforcement by smugglers has been common in Vietnam and China, and in 2015 in East Java, Indonesia, two farmers who led a series of protests against an illegal beach sand mining operation received death threats from mine operators.

== Consequences of sand smuggling ==
=== Environmental ===
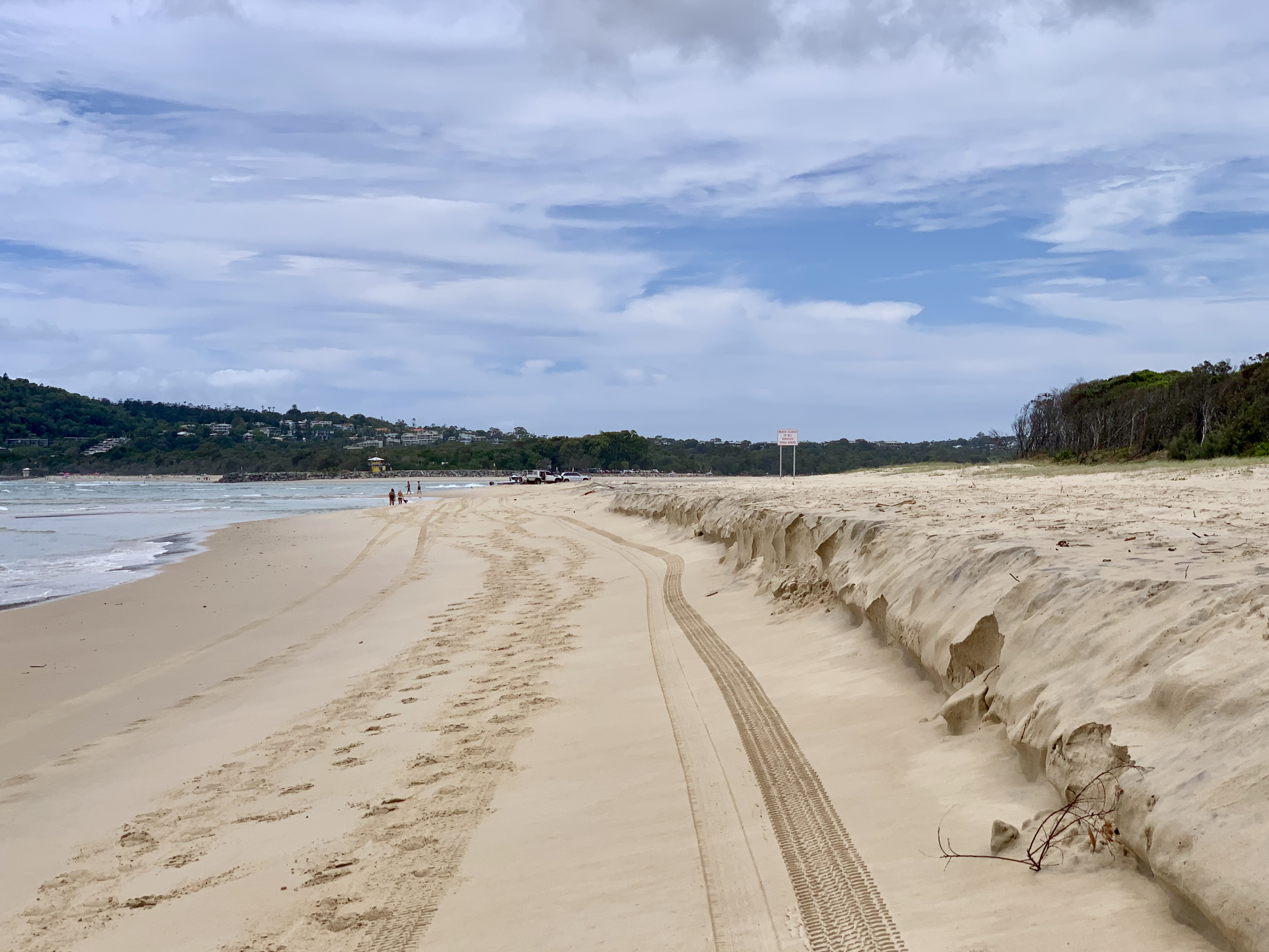
Beach erosion

Desert sand is not suitable for construction or land reclamation because it is too smooth to provide the necessary stability. Therefore, sand has to be mined from land quarries and riverbeds, but because of the decline of inland sources mining is shifting to seabeds and coasts where the extraction causes serious environmental damages. The consequences include: Loss of biodiversity, loss of land and changes of landscapes due to erosion, changes to the hydrological function of rivers and ocean currents, polluting and shortening of water supply, and damages to infrastructure.

Research from Sri Lanka has shown that illegal sand mining in the local river systems contributes to a lack of irrigation water. This in turn can lead to loss of productive farmland. Furthermore, the quality of drinking water from rivers can be severely decreased because illegal and excessive mining for smuggling can cause salinization which pollutes drinking water reserves.

Indiscriminate sand mining causes the lowering of riverbeds which in turn, imposes severe damages to the physical and biological environments of these river systems. Likewise, sand dredging in oceans and rivers for smuggling can lead to increased risks of floods, loss of entire beaches and shorelines, destruction of property and damages to coral reefs.

Certain species of turtles are becoming endangered because they are losing their sandy breeding sites. The same applies for other reptiles such as seldom crocodiles. Sand mining is at least in part responsible for observed decreased fisheries production. In the Cambodian Koh Kong province where dredging and smuggling activities are prevalent, fish catches have decreased by 50 percent. In this region fishing is sometimes the only economic activity and people depend on the catches for subsistence living.

Furthermore, sand mining has even been associated with the spread of malaria by creating standing pools of water at extraction sites that serve as ideal breeding grounds for disease-carrying mosquitos.

=== Geopolitical ===
Sand is now believed to have a potentially destabilizing effect on South East Asia because environmental degradation due to sand smuggling and disputes over the resource reinforce the perception among the local populations of other countries in the region as threats. Therefore, it poses an obstacle for further integration of the ASEAN countries.

Riau Islands in Indonesia

Sand trading (and therefore also sand smuggling) has unprecedented consequences for the concept of territoriality. The removal of sand from one country to be used for land reclamation in another country (e.g. Singapore) has opened up the possibility to effectively transfer territory between nations. Through sand smuggling a country can be involuntarily forced into this transfer. Consequently, sand has surpassed its undervalued status as a construction commodity and has become a fundamental power factor in South East Asia. Especially for Singapore, it has become a matter of national security. Moreover, Malaysia has taken advantage of the increased importance of its sand resources by using access to them strategically as a contentious bargaining chip in negotiations over a new bridge between Malaysia and Singapore.

Sand is also affecting the already difficult relation between Indonesia and Singapore. Indonesia deployed its navy to capture sand dredgers which transported sand from Indonesia's Riau Islands to Singapore. It is being reported that due to sand mining Indonesia has already lost 24 islands in this province because their proximity to the border with Singapore makes them an easy target for sand smugglers. Another 83 small low-lying islands are under threat to their existence. This could have potential implications as to where the border will be which will only add tension to the relation between the two countries.

== Measures against sand smuggling ==
=== More research ===
Despite the efforts of media and non-governmental organizations, the problems of illegal sand mining and smuggling remain largely invisible to the global public. More data on sand use, sand extraction, and environmental consequences is needed in order to raise public awareness for the issue and tackle it more effectively.

=== More regulations and law enforcement ===
Currently there are no international conventions to regulate sand extraction, use, and trade, which makes effective monitoring and law enforcement difficult. The weakness of governance and law enforcement and rampant corruption have repeatedly been identified as facilitators of sand smuggling. Governments could reduce illegal sand mining by setting regulation and penalties, and by increasing patrols and monitoring in areas favorable for exploitation.

The call for more regulations and law enforcement is not uncontroversial though. Illegal operations often take place in underdeveloped or developing countries where corruption is high, and governments do not have the necessary financial and human resources to effectively enforce the regulations and the monitoring. Moreover, smuggling of different types of sand and black market activity in South East Asia has not always been correlated positively with weak control of the state crossing different times and regimes.

=== Recycling of construction materials ===
Recycling targets the problem from the demand side by reducing consumption of newly mined sand and therefore decreases the incentive for illegal production at the beginning of the supply chain. Recycled concrete from old buildings or quarry dust material could be used for building houses and roads.

Governments are responsible for implementing adequate recycling policies. However, it is doubtful that recycling will be able to significantly contribute to the reduction of sand smuggling due to the extent of current and future sand consumption.

=== Innovation of alternative materials and construction technologies ===
Innovation of alternative materials to be used in concrete and cement pose additional possibilities that could reduce the demand for natural sand while meeting the market's needs for social-economic development.

Crushed rocks are considered to become an artificial source of sand, but the crushed rock sands have undesirable particle sizes and grain shapes which affects concrete quality and workability and in turn requires new technologies for the use of all grades of sand in constructions. Small particles of plastic waste can be utilized as so-called ‘plastic sand’ to produce concrete, which is hoped to replace 10 percent of the natural sand in concrete in the future and could save at least 800 million tonnes of natural sand per year.

Another way that innovation could reduce sand demand is by developing new building technologies with reduced sand requirements. Currently, a team at Cambridge University is working on more efficient building designs that use less concrete for structural integrity and are therefore more resource efficient.

=== Socio-economic approach ===
Sand smuggling provides employment for unemployed youth who are deprived of agricultural jobs and engage in these illegal activities in order to earn a livelihood.

Consequently, the improvement of the employment situation for young people and reduction of poverty within the general population could disincentivize the engagement in sand smuggling and other illegal activities. The argument of fighting smuggling through economic policies is strengthened by a 2008 study from Erwiza Erman who found a correlation between the intensification of smuggling in Indonesia in the late 1970s and early 1980s and the decline of important local economic sectors. These findings suggest that economic prosperity curbs smuggling.

== See also ==
- Sand theft
- Illegal sand trade
