= Double-Heart of Stacked Stones =

Stone fish trap in Qimei, Penghu, Taiwan

Double-Heart of Stacked Stones 七美雙心石滬
- Fishing weir
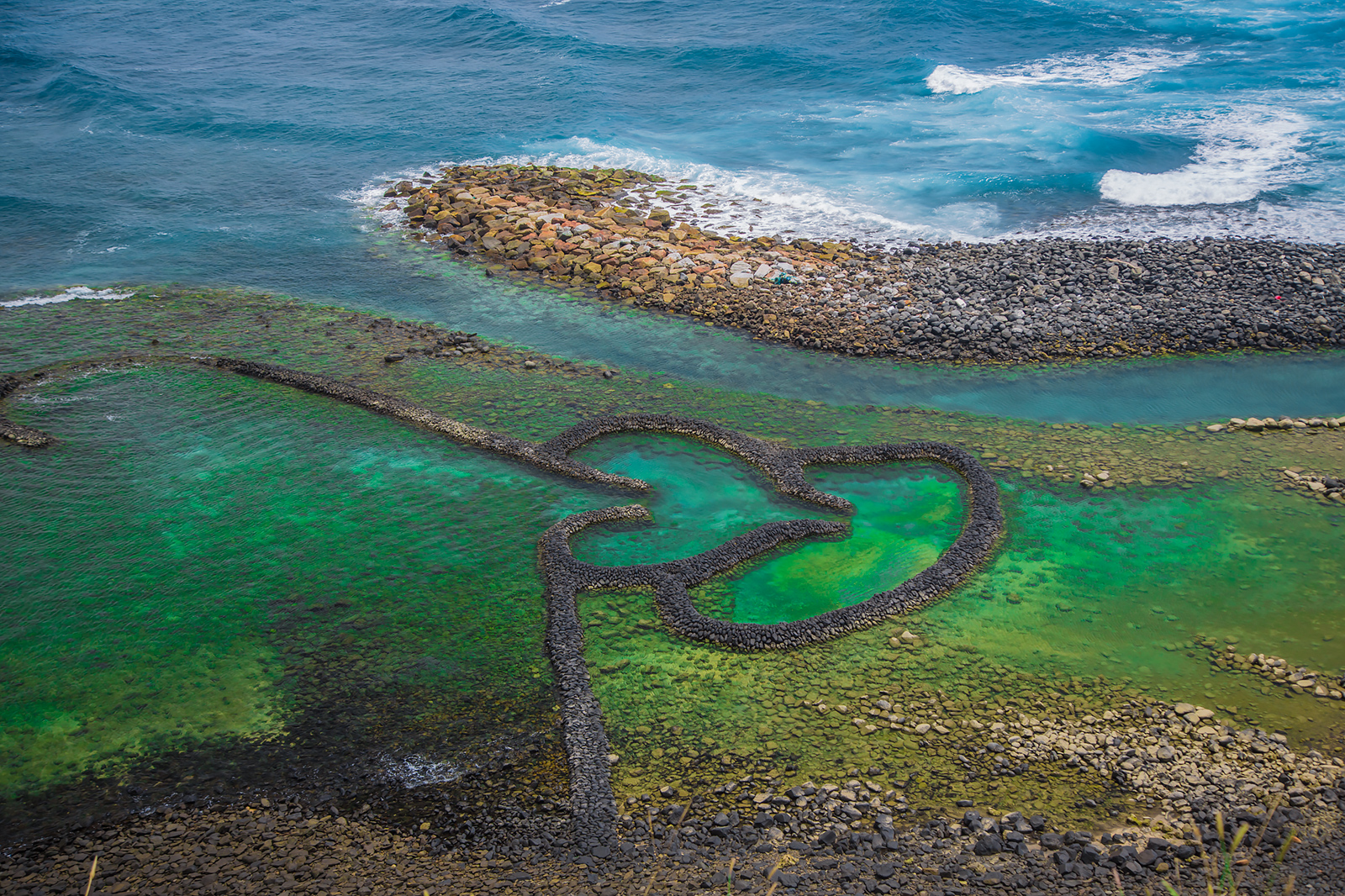

- Location within Penghu County
- Coordinates: 23°13′13.0″N 119°26′49.0″E
- Location: Cimei, Penghu, Taiwan
- Water bodies: Taiwan Strait
- Geology: rock

The Double-Heart of Stacked Stones (traditional Chinese: 七美雙心石滬; simplified Chinese: 七美双心石沪; pinyin: Qīměi Shuāng Xīn Shí Hù) or the Twin-Heart Fish Trap is a stone fishing weir located on the north side of Cimei Township, Penghu County, Taiwan. It is a well-preserved ancient fish trap made by stacking stones to form a trap that resembles a flying heart.

It is one of hundreds of ancient tidal stone fish weirs in Taiwan, the oldest known example of which was constructed by the indigenous Taokas people in Miaoli County. The heart or arrow-shaped tidal stone weir is one of the ancestral fishing technologies of the seafaring Austronesian peoples, and similar ancient stone weirs are also widespread throughout Austronesian regions, including the Philippines, eastern Indonesia, Micronesia, Melanesia, and Polynesia, with examples being found as far as Hawaii. The technology spread to the Han Taiwanese and the Japanese when Taiwan came under their control in the recent centuries.

It is considered a potential World Heritage Site.

== See also ==
- Austronesian fishing weirs
- List of tourist attractions in Taiwan
