= August 10 =

August 10 this year in various calendars
- Monday, 10 August 2026
Akan	Nwonadwo
Armenian	21 Nawasardi 1476
Aztec	Pānquetzaliztli 12, 5 Xōchitl
Babylonian	26 Du'uzu, 2337 SE
Balinese pawukon	Menga, Beteng, Laba, Wage, Aryang, Coma of Tambir, Brahma, Tulus, Dewa
Bengali	26 Shrabon, BS 1433
Chinese	Yang Fire Dragon・Net Mansion; Fire Horse Year, Month 6, Day 28 (Liqiu, 13 days until Chushu)
Common Era	10 August 2026 CE
Coptic	4 Mesori, AM 1742
Egyptian	26 Choiak, 2775 NE
Ethiopian	4 Naḥasē, 2018 Amätä Məhrät
French Republican	Décade III, Tridi de Thermidor de l'Année 234 de la République
Gregorian	10 August, AD 2026
Hebrew	27 Av, AM 5786
Hindu	Ārdrā・Harṣaṇa; Solar: 25 Śrāvaṇa, 1948 SE; Lunisolar: Trayodaśī, Kṛishna pakṣa of Āṣāḍha, 2083 VE; Rāudra・5127 KY・1,872,797
Icelandic	Mánudagur, 16 Heyannir 2026
Islamic	25 Safar, AH 1448 (using tabular method)
ISO week date	2026-W33-1
Japanese	28 Minazuki, Reiwa 8 (Risshū, 13 days until Shosho)
Julian	28 July, AD 2026 (AM 7534)
Julian day	2461263
Korean	28 Yangdal, 4359 DE
Maya	13.0.13.15.0; 13 Yaxkin, 5 Ahau
Roman	ante diem V Kalendas Augustas, MMDCCLXXIX AUC
Solar Hijri	19 Mordad, SH 1405
Tibetan	27 chu stod, me pho rta 2153 or 1772 or 1000

<<	August					>>
Su	Mo	Tu	We	Th	Fr	Sa
						1
2	3	4	5	6	7	8
9	10	11	12	13	14	15
16	17	18	19	20	21	22
23	24	25	26	27	28	29
30	31
2026

August 10 in recent years
2026 (Monday)
2025 (Sunday)
2024 (Saturday)
2023 (Thursday)
2022 (Wednesday)
2021 (Tuesday)
2020 (Monday)
2019 (Saturday)
2018 (Friday)
2017 (Thursday)

August 10 is the 222nd day of the year (223rd in leap years) in the Gregorian calendar; 143 days remain until the end of the year.

== Events ==
=== Pre-1600 ===
- 654 – Pope Eugene I elected to succeed Martinus I.
- 955 – Battle of Lechfeld: Otto I, Holy Roman Emperor defeats the Magyars, ending 50 years of Magyar invasion of the West.
- 991 – Battle of Maldon: The English, led by Byrhtnoth, Ealdorman of Essex, are defeated by a band of inland-raiding Vikings near Maldon, Essex.
- 1030 – The Battle of Azaz ends with a humiliating retreat of the Byzantine emperor, Romanos III Argyros, against the Mirdasid rulers of Aleppo. The retreat degenerates into a rout, in which Romanos himself barely escapes capture.
- 1258 – Manfred, illegitimate son of Frederick II, is crowned king of Sicily.
- 1270 – Yekuno Amlak takes the imperial throne of Ethiopia, restoring the Solomonic dynasty to power after a 100-year Zagwe interregnum.
- 1316 – The Second Battle of Athenry takes place near Athenry during the Bruce campaign in Ireland.
- 1346 – Jaume Ferrer sets out from Mallorca for the "River of Gold", the Senegal River.
- 1512 – The naval Battle of Saint-Mathieu, during the War of the League of Cambrai, sees the simultaneous destruction of the Breton ship La Cordelière and the English ship The Regent.
- 1519 – Ferdinand Magellan's five ships set sail from Seville to circumnavigate the globe. The Basque second-in-command Juan Sebastián Elcano will complete the expedition after Magellan's death in the Philippines.
- 1557 – Battle of St. Quentin: Spanish victory over the French in the Italian War of 1551–59.
- 1585 – The Treaty of Nonsuch signed by Elizabeth I of England and the Dutch Rebels.

=== 1601–1900 ===
- 1628 – The Swedish warship Vasa sinks on her maiden voyage off Stockholm.
- 1641 – The Treaty of London between England and Scotland, ending the Bishops' Wars, is signed.
- 1664 – The Habsburg empire and the Ottoman empire sign the peace treaty of Vasvár, which results in peace until 1683.
- 1680 – The Pueblo Revolt begins in New Mexico.
- 1741 – King Marthanda Varma of Travancore defeats the Dutch East India Company at the Battle of Colachel, effectively bringing about the end of the Dutch colonial rule in India.
- 1755 – Under the direction of Charles Lawrence, the British begin to forcibly deport the Acadians from Nova Scotia to the Thirteen Colonies and France.
- 1792 – French Revolution: Storming of the Tuileries Palace: Louis XVI is arrested and taken into custody as his Swiss Guards are massacred by the Parisian mob.
- 1808 – Finnish War: Swedish forces led by General von Döbeln defeat Russian forces led by General Šepelev in the Battle of Kauhajoki.
- 1835 – P. T. Barnum begins his career as a showman and circus entrepreneur by exhibiting Joice Heth, an octogenerian African slave whom he claims was George Washington's nursemaid.
- 1856 – The Last Island hurricane strikes Louisiana, resulting in over 200 deaths.
- 1861 – American Civil War: Battle of Wilson's Creek: A mixed force of Confederate, Missouri State Guard, and Arkansas State troops defeat outnumbered attacking Union forces in the southwestern part of Missouri.
- 1864 – After Uruguay's governing Blanco Party refuses Brazil's demands, José Antônio Saraiva announces that the Brazilian military will begin reprisals, beginning the Uruguayan War.
- 1864 – After a severe electric storm, Providence Spring emerged at the Confederate States Army's Andersonville Prison in Sumter County, Georgia, making it the only source of clean drinking water for 32,000 Union Army prisoners on 27 acres (11 ha) of ground.

=== 1901–present ===
- 1901 – The U.S. Steel recognition strike by the Amalgamated Association of Iron and Steel Workers begins.
- 1904 – Russo-Japanese War: The Battle of the Yellow Sea between the Russian and Japanese battleship fleets takes place.
- 1905 – Russo-Japanese War: Peace negotiations begin in Portsmouth, New Hampshire.
- 1913 – Second Balkan War: Delegates from Bulgaria, Romania, Serbia, Montenegro, and Greece sign the Treaty of Bucharest, ending the war.
- 1920 – World War I: Ottoman sultan Mehmed VI's representatives sign the Treaty of Sèvres that divides up the Ottoman Empire between the Allies.
- 1937 – Spanish Civil War: The Regional Defence Council of Aragon is dissolved by the Second Spanish Republic.
- 1944 – World War II: The Battle of Guam in the Pacific comes to an effective end.
- 1944 – World War II: The Battle of Narva on the Eastern Front ends with a defensive German victory.
- 1945 – The Japanese government announced that a message had been sent to the Allies accepting the terms of the Potsdam Declaration provided that it "does not comprise any demand that prejudices the prerogatives of the Emperor as sovereign ruler."
- 1948 – Candid Camera makes its television debut after being on radio for a year as The Candid Microphone.
- 1949 – An amendment to the National Security Act of 1947 enhances the authority of the United States Secretary of Defense over the Army, Navy and Air Force, and replaces the National Military Establishment with the Department of Defense.
- 1953 – First Indochina War: The French Union withdraws its forces from Operation Camargue against the Viet Minh in central Vietnam.
- 1954 – At Massena, New York, the groundbreaking ceremony for the Saint Lawrence Seaway is held.
- 1961 – Vietnam War: The U.S. Army begins Operation Ranch Hand, spraying an estimated 20 million US gallons (76,000 m^{3}) of defoliants and herbicides over rural areas of South Vietnam in an attempt to deprive the Viet Cong of food and vegetation cover.
- 1966 – The Heron Road Bridge collapses while being built, killing nine workers in the deadliest construction accident in both Ottawa and Ontario.
- 1969 – A day after murdering actress Sharon Tate and four others, members of Charles Manson's cult kill Leno and Rosemary LaBianca.
- 1971 – The Society for American Baseball Research is founded in Cooperstown, New York.
- 1977 – In Yonkers, New York, 24-year-old postal employee David Berkowitz ("Son of Sam") is arrested for a series of killings in the New York City area over the period of one year.
- 1978 – Three members of the Ulrich family are killed in an accident. This leads to the Ford Pinto litigation.
- 1981 – Murder of Adam Walsh: The head of John Walsh's son is found. This inspires the creation of the television series America's Most Wanted and the National Center for Missing & Exploited Children.
- 1988 – Japanese American internment: U.S. President Ronald Reagan signs the Civil Liberties Act of 1988, providing $20,000 payments to Japanese Americans who were either interned in or relocated by the United States during World War II.
- 1990 – The Magellan space probe reaches Venus.
- 1993 – Two earthquakes affect New Zealand. A 7.0 M_{w} shock (intensity VI (Strong)) in the South Island was followed nine hours later by a 6.4 M_{w} event (intensity VII (Very strong)) in the North Island.
- 1995 – Oklahoma City bombing: Timothy McVeigh and Terry Nichols are indicted for the bombing. Michael Fortier pleads guilty in a plea-bargain for his testimony.
- 1997 – Sixteen people are killed when Formosa Airlines Flight 7601 crashes near Beigan Airport in the Matsu Islands of Taiwan.
- 1998 – HRH Prince Al-Muhtadee Billah is proclaimed the crown prince of Brunei with a Royal Proclamation.
- 1999 – One person is killed and five people are injured in the Los Angeles Jewish Community Center shooting.
- 2001 – The 2001 Angola train attack occurs, causing 252 deaths.
- 2001 – Space Shuttle program: The Space Shuttle Discovery is launched on STS-105 to the International Space Station, carrying the astronauts of Expedition 3 to replace the crew of Expedition 2.
- 2003 – The Okinawa Urban Monorail is opened in Naha, Okinawa.
- 2009 – Twenty people are killed in Handlová, Trenčín Region, in the deadliest mining disaster in Slovakia's history.
- 2012 – The Marikana massacre begins near Rustenburg, South Africa, resulting in the deaths of 47 people.
- 2014 – Forty people are killed when Sepahan Airlines Flight 5915 crashes at Tehran's Mehrabad International Airport.
- 2018 – Horizon Air employee Richard Russell hijacks and performs an unauthorized takeoff on a Horizon Air Bombardier Dash 8 Q400 plane at Seattle–Tacoma International Airport in Washington, flying it for more than an hour before crashing the plane and killing himself on Ketron Island in Puget Sound.
- 2018 – An anti-government rally turns into a riot when members of the Romanian Gendarmerie attack the 100,000 people protesting in front of the Victoria Palace, leading to 452 recorded injuries. The authorities alleged that the crowd was infiltrated by hooligans who began attacking law enforcement agents.
- 2019 – Thirty-two are killed and one million are evacuated as Typhoon Lekima makes landfall in Zhejiang, China. Earlier it had caused flooding in the Philippines.
- 2019 – Philip Manshaus shoots his stepsister and attacks a mosque in the Bærum mosque shooting.
- 2020 – Derecho in Iowa becomes the most costly thunderstorm disaster in U.S. history.
- 2024 – Israel strikes Al-Tabaeen school in eastern Gaza City, killing at least 80 Palestinians.

== Births ==
=== Pre-1600 ===
- 941 – Lê Hoàn, Vietnamese emperor (died 1005)
- 1267 – James II of Aragon (died 1327)
- 1296 – John of Bohemia (died 1346)
- 1360 – Francesco Zabarella, Italian cardinal (died 1417)
- 1397 – Albert II of Germany (died 1439)
- 1439 – Anne of York, Duchess of Exeter, Duchess of York (died 1476)
- 1449 – Bona of Savoy, Duchess of Savoy (died 1503)
- 1466 – Francesco II Gonzaga, Marquess of Mantua (died 1519)
- 1489 – Jacob Sturm von Sturmeck, German lawyer and politician (died 1553)
- 1520 – Madeleine of Valois (died 1537)
- 1528 – Eric II, Duke of Brunswick-Lüneburg (died 1584)
- 1547 – Francis II, Duke of Saxe-Lauenburg (died 1619)
- 1560 – Hieronymus Praetorius, German organist and composer (died 1629)

=== 1601–1900 ===
- 1602 – Gilles de Roberval, French mathematician and academic (died 1675)
- 1645 – Eusebio Kino, Italian priest and missionary (died 1711)
- 1734 – Naungdawgyi, Burmese king (died 1763)
- 1737 – Anton Losenko, Russian painter and academic (died 1773)
- 1740 – Samuel Arnold, English organist and composer (died 1802)
- 1744 – Alexandrine Le Normant d'Étiolles, daughter of Madame de Pompadour (died 1754)
- 1755 – Narayan Rao, fifth Peshwa of the Maratha Empire (died 1773)
- 1782 – Vicente Guerrero, Mexican insurgent leader and President of Mexico (died 1831)
- 1805 – Ferenc Toldy, German-Hungarian historian and critic (died 1875)
- 1809 – John Kirk Townsend, American ornithologist and explorer (died 1851)
- 1810 – Camillo Benso, Count of Cavour, Italian soldier and politician, 1st Prime Minister of Italy (died 1861)
- 1814 – Henri Nestlé, German businessman, founded Nestlé (died 1890)
- 1814 – John C. Pemberton, United States soldier and Confederate general (died 1881)
- 1821 – Jay Cooke, American financier, founded Jay Cooke & Company (died 1905)
- 1823 – Hugh Stowell Brown, English minister and reformer (died 1886)
- 1825 – István Türr, Hungarian soldier, architect, and engineer, co-designed the Corinth Canal (died 1908)
- 1827 – Lovro Toman, Slovenian lawyer and politician (died 1870)
- 1839 – Aleksandr Stoletov, Russian physicist and academic (died 1896)
- 1845 – Abai Qunanbaiuli, Kazakh poet, composer, and philosopher (died 1904)
- 1848 – William Harnett, Irish-American painter and educator (died 1892)
- 1856 – William Willett, English inventor, founded British Summer Time (died 1915)
- 1860 – Vishnu Narayan Bhatkhande, Indian singer and musicologist (died 1936)
- 1865 – Alexander Glazunov, Russian composer, conductor, and educator (died 1936)
- 1868 – Hugo Eckener, German pilot and businessman (died 1954)
- 1869 – Laurence Binyon, English poet, playwright, and scholar (died 1943)
- 1870 – Trần Tế Xương, Vietnamese poet and satirist (died 1907)
- 1872 – William Manuel Johnson, American bassist (died 1972)
- 1874 – Herbert Hoover, American engineer and politician, 31st President of the United States (died 1964)
- 1874 – Antanas Smetona, Lithuanian jurist and politician, President of Lithuania (died 1944)
- 1877 – Frank Marshall, American chess player and author (died 1944)
- 1878 – Alfred Döblin, Polish-German physician and author (died 1957)
- 1880 – Robert L. Thornton, American businessman and politician, Mayor of Dallas (died 1964)
- 1884 – Panait Istrati, Romanian journalist and author (died 1935)
- 1888 – Prince Christopher of Greece and Denmark (died 1940)
- 1889 – Charles Darrow, American game designer, created Monopoly (died 1967)
- 1889 – Zofia Kossak-Szczucka, Polish writer and member of the WW II Polish Resistance (died 1968)
- 1890 – Angus Lewis Macdonald, Canadian lawyer and politician, 12th Premier of Nova Scotia (died 1954)
- 1894 – V. V. Giri, Indian lawyer and politician, 4th President of India (died 1980)
- 1895 – Hammy Love, Australian cricketer (died 1969)
- 1896 – Charlie Daly, Executed Irish Republican (died 1923)
- 1897 – John W. Galbreath, American businessman and philanthropist, founded Darby Dan Farm (died 1988)
- 1897 – Jack Haley, American actor and singer (died 1979)
- 1900 – Arthur Porritt, Baron Porritt, New Zealand physician and politician, 11th Governor-General of New Zealand (died 1994)

=== 1901–present ===
- 1902 – Norma Shearer, Canadian-American actress (died 1983)
- 1902 – Curt Siodmak, German-English author and screenwriter (died 2000)
- 1902 – Arne Tiselius, Swedish biochemist and academic, Nobel Prize laureate (died 1971)
- 1903 – Ward Moore, American author (died 1978)
- 1905 – Era Bell Thompson, American journalist and author (died 1986)
- 1907 – Su Yu, Chinese general and politician (died 1984)
- 1908 – Rica Erickson, Australian botanist, historian, and author (died 2009)
- 1908 – Billy Gonsalves, American soccer player (died 1977)
- 1909 – Leo Fender, American businessman, founded Fender Musical Instruments Corporation (died 1991)
- 1909 – Richard J. Hughes, American politician, 45th Governor of New Jersey, and Chief Justice of the New Jersey Supreme Court (died 1992)
- 1910 – Guy Mairesse, French racing driver (died 1954)
- 1911 – Leonidas Andrianopoulos, Greek footballer (died 2011)
- 1911 – A. N. Sherwin-White, English historian and author (died 1993)
- 1912 – Jorge Amado, Brazilian novelist and poet (died 2001)
- 1913 – Noah Beery Jr., American actor (died 1994)
- 1913 – Kalevi Kotkas, Estonian-Finnish high jumper and discus thrower (died 1983)
- 1913 – Wolfgang Paul, German physicist and academic, Nobel Prize laureate (died 1993)
- 1914 – Jeff Corey, American actor and director (died 2002)
- 1914 – Carlos Menditeguy, Argentinian racing driver and polo player (died 1973)
- 1914 – Ray Smith, English cricketer (died 1996)
- 1918 – Eugene P. Wilkinson, American admiral (died 2013)
- 1920 – Red Holzman, American basketball player and coach (died 1998)
- 1922 – Al Alberts, American pop singer and composer (died 2009)
- 1923 – Bill Doolittle, American football player and coach (died 2014)
- 1923 – Rhonda Fleming, American actress (died 2020)
- 1923 – Fred Ridgway, English cricketer and footballer (died 2015)
- 1923 – SM Sultan, Bangladeshi painter and illustrator (died 1994)
- 1924 – Nancy Buckingham, English author (died 2022)
- 1924 – Martha Hyer, American actress (died 2014)
- 1924 – Jean-François Lyotard, French philosopher, sociologist, and literary theorist (died 1998)
- 1925 – George Cooper, English general (died 2020)
- 1926 – Marie-Claire Alain, French organist and educator (died 2013)
- 1926 – Carol Ruth Vander Velde, American mathematician (died 1972)
- 1927 – Jimmy Martin, American singer and guitarist (died 2005)
- 1927 – Vernon Washington, American actor (died 1988)
- 1928 – Jimmy Dean, American singer, actor, and businessman, founded the Jimmy Dean Food Company (died 2010)
- 1928 – Eddie Fisher, American singer and actor (died 2010)
- 1928 – Gerino Gerini, Italian racing driver (died 2013)
- 1928 – Gus Mercurio, American-Australian actor (died 2010)
- 1930 – Barry Unsworth, English-Italian author and academic (died 2012)
- 1931 – Dolores Alexander, American journalist and activist (died 2008)
- 1931 – Tom Laughlin, American actor, director, producer, and screenwriter (died 2013)
- 1932 – Alexander Goehr, English composer and academic (died 2024)
- 1932 – Gaudencio Rosales, Filipino cardinal
- 1933 – Doyle Brunson, American poker player (died 2023)
- 1933 – Elizabeth Butler-Sloss, Baroness Butler-Sloss, English lawyer and judge
- 1933 – Rocky Colavito, American baseball player and sportscaster (died 2024)
- 1933 – Keith Duckworth, English engineer, founded Cosworth (died 2005)
- 1934 – Tevfik Kış, Turkish wrestler and trainer (died 2019)
- 1935 – Ian Stewart, Baron Stewartby, English politician, Minister of State for the Armed Forces (died 2018)
- 1935 – Ad van Luyn, Dutch bishop
- 1936 – Malene Schwartz, Danish actress
- 1937 – Anatoly Sobchak, Russian scholar and politician, Mayor of Saint Petersburg (died 2000)
- 1938 – Tony Ross, English author and illustrator
- 1939 – Kate O'Mara, English actress (died 2014)
- 1939 – Charlie Rose, American lawyer and politician (died 2012)
- 1940 – Bobby Hatfield, American singer-songwriter (died 2003)
- 1940 – Sid Waddell, English sportscaster (died 2012)
- 1941 – Anita Lonsbrough, English swimmer and journalist
- 1941 – Susan Dorothea White, Australian painter and sculptor
- 1942 – Speedy Duncan, American football player (died 2021)
- 1942 – Betsey Johnson, American fashion designer
- 1942 – Michael Pepper, English physicist and engineer
- 1942 – Norbert Putnam, American session bassist (Muscle Shoals Rhythm Section), and record producer
- 1943 – Louise Forestier, Canadian singer-songwriter and actress
- 1943 – Jimmy Griffin, American singer-songwriter and guitarist (died 2005)
- 1943 – Michael Mantler, American trumpet player and composer
- 1943 – Shafqat Rana, Indian-Pakistani cricketer
- 1943 – Ronnie Spector, American singer-songwriter (died 2022)
- 1945 – Harriet Miers, American lawyer (White House counsel to George W. Bush)
- 1947 – Ian Anderson, Scottish-English singer-songwriter and guitarist
- 1947 – Anwar Ibrahim, Malaysian academic and politician, 10th Prime Minister of Malaysia
- 1947 – John Spencer, English rugby player and manager
- 1947 – Alan Ward, English cricketer
- 1948 – Nick Stringer, English actor
- 1950 – Patti Austin, American singer-songwriter
- 1951 – Juan Manuel Santos, Colombian businessman and politician, 59th President of Colombia
- 1952 – Carla Hayden, American librarian (1st African American and female Librarian of Congress)
- 1952 – Daniel Hugh Kelly, American actor
- 1952 – Diane Venora, American actress
- 1954 – Peter Endrulat, German footballer
- 1954 – Rick Overton, American screenwriter, actor and comedian
- 1955 – Thomas Kidd, American illustrator
- 1955 – Jim Mees, American set designer (died 2013)
- 1955 – Mel Tiangco, Filipino journalist and talk show host
- 1955 – Rainer Wimmer, Austrian politician
- 1956 – Dianne Fromholtz, Australian tennis player
- 1956 – José Luis Montes, Spanish footballer and manager (died 2013)
- 1956 – Fred Ottman, American wrestler
- 1956 – Charlie Peacock, American singer-songwriter, pianist, and producer
- 1956 – Perween Warsi, Indian-English businesswoman
- 1957 – Fred Ho, American saxophonist, composer, and playwright (died 2014)
- 1957 – Andres Põime, Estonian architect
- 1957 – Aqeel Abbas Jafari, Pakistani writer, poet, architect and chief editor Urdu Dictionary Board
- 1958 – Michael Dokes, American boxer (died 2012)
- 1958 – Jack Richards, English cricketer, coach, and manager
- 1958 – Rosie Winterton, English nurse and politician, Shadow Leader of the House of Commons
- 1959 – Rosanna Arquette, American actress, director, and producer
- 1959 – Albert Owen, Welsh sailor and politician
- 1959 – Mark Price, English drummer
- 1959 – Florent Vollant, Canadian singer-songwriter
- 1960 – Antonio Banderas, Spanish actor and producer
- 1960 – Annely Ojastu, Estonian sprinter and long jumper
- 1960 – Kenny Perry, American golfer
- 1961 – Jon Farriss, Australian drummer, songwriter, and producer
- 1962 – Suzanne Collins, American author and screenwriter
- 1962 – Julia Fordham, English singer-songwriter
- 1963 – Phoolan Devi, Indian lawyer and politician (died 2001)
- 1963 – Anton Janssen, Dutch footballer and coach
- 1963 – Andrew Sullivan, English-American journalist and author
- 1963 – Henrik Fisker, Danish automotive designer and businessman
- 1964 – Aaron Hall, American singer-songwriter
- 1964 – Kåre Kolve, Norwegian saxophonist and composer
- 1964 – Hiro Takahashi, Japanese singer-songwriter and guitarist (died 2005)
- 1965 – Claudia Christian, American actress, singer, writer, and director
- 1965 – Pat Pitney, American university leader and sport shooter
- 1965 – Mike E. Smith, American jockey and sportscaster
- 1965 – John Starks, American basketball player and coach
- 1966 – Charlie Dimmock, English gardener and television host
- 1966 – Hansi Kürsch, German singer-songwriter and bass player
- 1966 – Hossam Hassan, Egyptian footballer and manager
- 1967 – Philippe Albert, Belgian footballer and sportscaster
- 1967 – Riddick Bowe, American boxer
- 1967 – Todd Nichols, American singer-songwriter and guitarist
- 1967 – Reinout Scholte, Dutch cricketer
- 1968 – Michael Bivins, American singer and producer
- 1968 – Greg Hawgood, Canadian ice hockey player and coach
- 1969 – Emily Symons, Australian actress
- 1969 – Brian Drummond, Canadian voice actor
- 1970 – Doug Flach, American tennis player
- 1970 – Bret Hedican, American ice hockey player and sportscaster
- 1970 – Brendon Julian, New Zealand-Australian cricketer and journalist
- 1970 – Steve Mautone, Australian footballer and coach
- 1971 – Sal Fasano, American baseball player and coach
- 1971 – Stephan Groth, Danish singer-songwriter
- 1971 – Roy Keane, Irish footballer and manager
- 1971 – Mario Kindelán, Cuban boxer
- 1971 – Paul Newlove, English rugby player
- 1971 – Kevin Randleman, American mixed martial artist and wrestler (died 2016)
- 1971 – Justin Theroux, American actor
- 1972 – Dilana, South African singer-songwriter and actress
- 1972 – Lawrence Dallaglio, English rugby player and sportscaster
- 1972 – Angie Harmon, American model and actress
- 1972 – Christofer Johnsson, Swedish singer-songwriter, guitarist, and producer
- 1973 – Lisa Raymond, American tennis player
- 1973 – Javier Zanetti, Argentinian footballer
- 1974 – Haifaa al-Mansour, Saudi Arabian director and producer
- 1974 – Luis Marín, Costa Rican footballer and manager
- 1974 – Rachel Simmons, American scholar and author
- 1974 – David Sommeil, French footballer
- 1975 – İlhan Mansız, Turkish footballer and figure skater
- 1976 – Roadkill, American wrestler
- 1976 – Ian Murray, Scottish businessman and politician, Shadow Secretary of State for Scotland
- 1977 – Danny Griffin, Irish footballer
- 1977 – Matt Morgan, English comedian, actor, and radio host
- 1978 – Danny Allsopp, Australian footballer
- 1978 – Marcus Fizer, American basketball player
- 1978 – Chris Read, English cricketer
- 1979 – Dinusha Fernando, Sri Lankan cricketer
- 1979 – JoAnna Garcia Swisher, American actress
- 1979 – Ted Geoghegan, American author, screenwriter, and producer
- 1979 – Brandon Lyon, American baseball player
- 1979 – Rémy Martin, French rugby player
- 1979 – Matjaž Perc, Slovene physicist
- 1979 – Yannick Schroeder, French racing driver
- 1980 – Wade Barrett, English boxer, wrestler, and actor
- 1980 – Aaron Staton, American actor
- 1981 – Taufik Hidayat, Indonesian badminton player
- 1982 – John Alvbåge, Swedish footballer
- 1982 – Josh Anderson, American baseball player
- 1982 – Julia Melim, Brazilian actress
- 1982 – Shaun Murphy, English snooker player
- 1983 – Kyle Brown, American soccer player
- 1983 – C. B. Dollaway, American mixed martial artist
- 1983 – Héctor Faubel, Spanish motorcycle racer
- 1983 – Alexander Perezhogin, Russian ice hockey player
- 1983 – Mathieu Roy, Canadian ice hockey player
- 1984 – Ryan Eggold, American actor and composer
- 1984 – Mokomichi Hayami, Japanese model and actor
- 1984 – Jigar Naik, English cricketer
- 1984 – Matt Prater, American football player
- 1985 – Enrico Cortese, Italian footballer
- 1985 – Roy O'Donovan, Irish footballer
- 1985 – Kakuryū Rikisaburō, Mongolian sumo wrestler
- 1985 – Julia Skripnik, Estonian tennis player
- 1986 – Andrea Hlaváčková, Czech tennis player
- 1987 – Jim Bakkum, Dutch singer and actor
- 1987 – Ari Boyland, New Zealand actor and singer
- 1989 – Sam Gagner, Canadian ice hockey player
- 1989 – Ben Sahar, Israeli footballer
- 1989 – Brenton Thwaites, Australian actor
- 1990 – Cruze Ah-Nau, Australian rugby player
- 1990 – Lee Sung-kyung, South Korean model, actress, and singer
- 1990 – Lucas Till, American actor
- 1991 – Dagný Brynjarsdóttir, Icelandic footballer
- 1991 – Marcus Foligno, American-Canadian ice hockey player
- 1991 – Nikos Korovesis, Greek footballer
- 1991 – Chris Tremain, Australian cricketer
- 1992 – Archie Bradley, American baseball player
- 1992 – Michelle Khare, American YouTuber and television host
- 1992 – Oliver Rowland, English racing driver
- 1993 – Andre Drummond, American basketball player
- 1994 – Bernardo Silva, Portuguese footballer
- 1995 – Dalvin Cook, American football player
- 1996 – Lauren Tait, Scottish netball player
- 1997 – Kylie Jenner, American television personality and businesswoman
- 1997 – Luca Marini, Italian motorcycle rider
- 1999 – Ja Morant, American basketball player
- 1999 – Ritomo Miyata, Japanese racing driver
- 1999 – Nick Suzuki, Canadian ice hockey player
- 2000 – Sophia Smith, American soccer player
- 2000 – Jüri Vips, Estonian racing driver
- 2005 – Tidjane Salaün, French basketball player
- 2005 – Nikola Topić, Serbian basketball player

== Deaths ==
=== Pre-1600 ===
- 258 – Lawrence of Rome, Spanish-Italian deacon and saint (born 225)
- 794 – Fastrada, Frankish noblewoman (born 765)
- 796 – Eanbald, archbishop of York
- 847 – Al-Wathiq, Abbasid caliph (born 816)
- 955 – Conrad ('the Red'), duke of Lorraine
- 1241 – Eleanor, Fair Maid of Brittany (born 1184)
- 1250 – Eric IV of Denmark (born 1216)
- 1284 – Tekuder, Khan of the Mongol Ilkhanate
- 1316 – Felim mac Aedh Ua Conchobair, King of Connacht
- 1322 – John of La Verna, Italian ascetic (born 1259)
- 1410 – Louis II, Duke of Bourbon (born 1337)
- 1535 – Ippolito de' Medici, Italian cardinal (born 1509)
- 1536 – Francis III, Duke of Brittany, Dauphin of France, Brother of Henry II (born 1518)

=== 1601–1900 ===
- 1653 – Maarten Tromp, Dutch admiral (born 1598)
- 1655 – Alfonso de la Cueva, 1st Marquis of Bedmar, Spanish cardinal and diplomat (born 1572)
- 1660 – Esmé Stewart, 2nd Duke of Richmond (born 1649)
- 1723 – Guillaume Dubois, French cardinal and politician, French Secretary of State for Foreign Affairs (born 1656)
- 1759 – Ferdinand VI of Spain (born 1713)
- 1784 – Allan Ramsay, Scottish-English painter (born 1713)
- 1796 – Ignaz Anton von Indermauer, Austrian nobleman and government official (born 1759)
- 1802 – Franz Aepinus, German-Russian philosopher and academic (born 1724)
- 1806 – Michael Haydn, Austrian composer and educator (born 1737)
- 1839 – Sir John St Aubyn, 5th Baronet, English lawyer and politician (born 1758)
- 1862 – Hon'inbō Shūsaku, Japanese Go player (born 1829)
- 1875 – Karl Andree, German geographer and journalist (born 1808)
- 1889 – Arthur Böttcher, German pathologist and anatomist (born 1831)
- 1890 – John Boyle O'Reilly, Irish-born poet, journalist and fiction writer (born 1844)
- 1896 – Otto Lilienthal, German pilot and engineer (born 1848)

=== 1901–present ===
- 1904 – Pierre Waldeck-Rousseau, French lawyer and politician, 68th Prime Minister of France (born 1846)
- 1913 – Johannes Linnankoski, Finnish author (born 1869)
- 1915 – Henry Moseley, English physicist and engineer (born 1887)
- 1916 – John J. Loud, American inventor (born 1844)
- 1918 – Erich Löwenhardt, German lieutenant and pilot (born 1897)
- 1920 – Ádám Politzer, Hungarian-Austrian physician and academic (born 1835)
- 1922 – Reginald Dunne, Irish Republican, executed for the killing of Sir Henry Wilson
- 1922 – Joseph O'Sullivan, Irish Republican, executed for the killing of Sir Henry Wilson
- 1929 – Pierre Fatou, French mathematician and astronomer (born 1878)
- 1929 – Aletta Jacobs, Dutch physician (born 1854)
- 1932 – Rin Tin Tin, American acting dog (born 1918)
- 1933 – Alf Morgans, Welsh-Australian politician, 4th Premier of Western Australia (born 1850)
- 1945 – Robert H. Goddard, American physicist and engineer (born 1882)
- 1948 – Kan'ichi Asakawa, Japanese-American historian, author, and academic (born 1873)
- 1948 – Andrew Brown, Scottish footballer and coach (born 1870)
- 1948 – Montague Summers, English clergyman and author (born 1880)
- 1949 – Homer Burton Adkins, American chemist (born 1892)
- 1954 – Robert Adair, American-born British actor (born 1900)
- 1958 – Frank Demaree, American baseball player and manager (born 1910)
- 1960 – Hamide Ayşe Sultan, Ottoman princess (born 1887)
- 1961 – Julia Peterkin, American author (born 1880)
- 1963 – Estes Kefauver, American lawyer and politician (born 1903)
- 1963 – Ernst Wetter, Swiss lawyer and jurist (born 1877)
- 1969 – János Kodolányi, Hungarian author (born 1899)
- 1976 – Bert Oldfield, Australian cricketer (born 1894)
- 1979 – Dick Foran, American actor and singer (born 1910)
- 1979 – Walter Gerlach, German physicist and academic (born 1889)
- 1980 – Yahya Khan, Pakistani general and politician, 3rd President of Pakistan (born 1917)
- 1982 – Anderson Bigode Herzer, Brazilian author and poet (born 1962)
- 1985 – Nate Barragar, American football player and sergeant (born 1906)
- 1987 – Georgios Athanasiadis-Novas, Greek lawyer and politician, 163rd Prime Minister of Greece (born 1893)
- 1991 – Lưu Trọng Lư, Vietnamese poet and playwright (born 1912)
- 1993 – Euronymous, Norwegian singer, guitarist, and producer (born 1968)
- 1997 – Jean-Claude Lauzon, Canadian director and screenwriter (born 1953)
- 1997 – Conlon Nancarrow, American-Mexican pianist and composer (born 1912)
- 1999 – Jennifer Paterson, English chef and television presenter (born 1928)
- 1999 – Baldev Upadhyaya, Indian historian, scholar, and critic (born 1899)
- 2000 – Gilbert Parkhouse, Welsh cricketer and rugby player (born 1925)
- 2001 – Lou Boudreau, American baseball player and manager (born 1917)
- 2002 – Michael Houser, American singer-songwriter and guitarist (born 1962)
- 2002 – Kristen Nygaard, Norwegian computer scientist and politician (born 1926)
- 2007 – Henry Cabot Lodge Bohler, American lieutenant and pilot (born 1925)
- 2007 – James E. Faust, American lawyer and religious leader (born 1920)
- 2007 – Jean Rédélé, French race car driver and pilot, founded Alpine (born 1922)
- 2007 – Tony Wilson, English journalist, producer, and manager, co-founded Factory Records (born 1950)
- 2008 – Isaac Hayes, American singer-songwriter, pianist, producer, and actor (born 1942)
- 2010 – Markus Liebherr, German-Swiss businessman (born 1948)
- 2010 – Adam Stansfield, English footballer (born 1978)
- 2010 – David L. Wolper, American director and producer (born 1928)
- 2011 – Billy Grammer, American singer-songwriter and guitarist (born 1925)
- 2012 – Philippe Bugalski, French race car driver (born 1963)
- 2012 – Ioan Dicezare, Romanian general and pilot (born 1916)
- 2012 – Irving Fein, American producer and manager (born 1911)
- 2012 – William W. Momyer, American general and pilot (born 1916)
- 2012 – Carlo Rambaldi, Italian special effects artist (born 1925)
- 2013 – William P. Clark Jr., American judge and politician, 12th United States National Security Advisor (born 1931)
- 2013 – Jonathan Dawson, Australian historian and academic (born 1941)
- 2013 – Eydie Gormé, American singer and actress (born 1928)
- 2013 – David C. Jones, American general (born 1921)
- 2013 – Jody Payne, American singer and guitarist (born 1936)
- 2013 – Amy Wallace, American author (born 1955)
- 2014 – Jim Command, American baseball player and scout (born 1928)
- 2014 – Dotty Lynch, American journalist and academic (born 1945)
- 2014 – Kathleen Ollerenshaw, English mathematician, astronomer, and politician, Lord Mayor of Manchester (born 1912)
- 2014 – Bob Wiesler, American baseball player (born 1930)
- 2015 – Buddy Baker, American race car driver and sportscaster (born 1941)
- 2015 – Endre Czeizel, Hungarian physician, geneticist, and academic (born 1935)
- 2015 – Knut Osnes, Norwegian footballer and coach (born 1922)
- 2015 – Eriek Verpale, Belgian author and poet (born 1952)
- 2017 – Ruth Pfau, German-Pakistani doctor and nun (born 1929)
- 2019 – Jeffrey Epstein, American financier and child sex trafficker (born 1953)
- 2021 – Tony Esposito, Canadian-American ice hockey player (born 1943)
- 2022 – Vesa-Matti Loiri, Finnish actor, musician and comedian (born 1945)
- 2024 – Rachael Lillis, American voice actress and scriptwriter (born 1978)
- 2024 – Peggy Moffitt, American model and actress (born 1937)
- 2025 – Anas Al-Sharif, Palestinian journalist and videographer (born 1996)

== Holidays and observances ==
- Argentine Air Force Day (Argentina)
- Christian feast day:
  - Bessus
  - Blane (Roman Catholic Church)
  - Geraint of Dumnonia
  - Lawrence of Rome
  - Nicola Saggio
  - Nuestra Señora del Buen Suceso de Parañaque, Patroness of Parañaque, Philippines
  - August 10 (Eastern Orthodox liturgics)
- Declaration of Independence of Quito, proclaimed independence from Spain on August 10, 1809. Independence was finally attained on May 24, 1822, at the Battle of Pichincha. (Ecuador)
- International Biodiesel Day
- National Veterans Day (Indonesia)
- World Lion Day
- National Day (Singapore)
