= Formosa Airlines =

Regional airline of Taiwan (1966–1999)

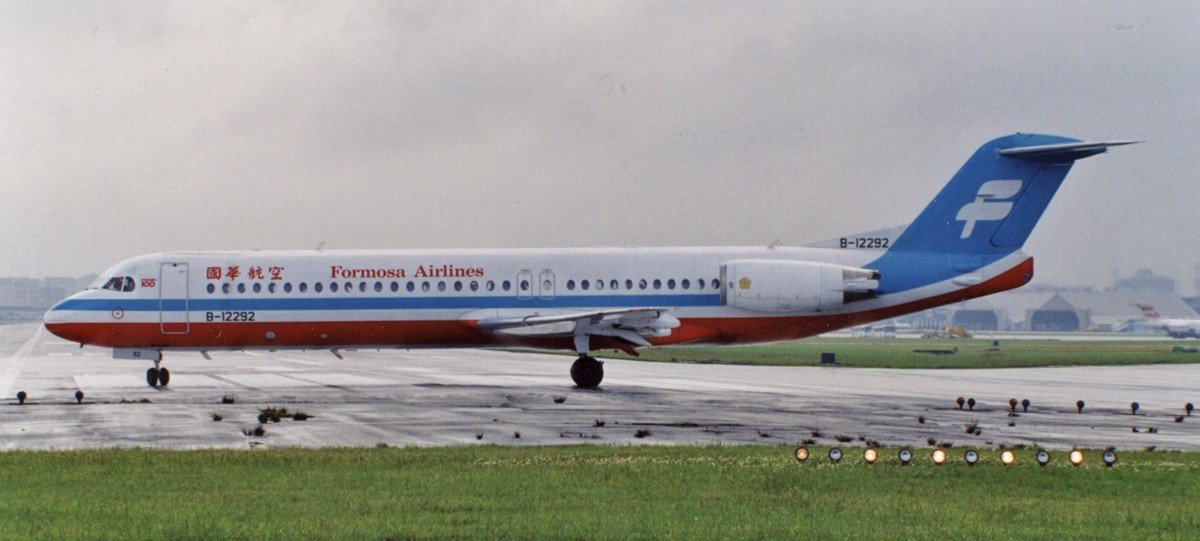
IATA	ICAO	Call sign
VY	FOS	—
- Founded: May 5, 1966 (as Yung Shing Airlines)
- Commenced operations: July 1, 1966 (as Yung Shing Airlines); August 8, 1987 (as Formosa Airlines)
- Ceased operations: August 8, 1999 (merged into Mandarin Airlines)
- Operating bases: Kaohsiung; Taipei–Songshan
- Destinations: 10
- Headquarters: Taipei

Formosa Airlines (Chinese: 國華航空; pinyin: Guóhuá Hángkōng) was a Taiwanese regional airline operating an extensive network of domestic routes out of its bases at Taipei Songshan Airport and Kaohsiung International Airport. Its headquarters were in Taipei.

== History ==
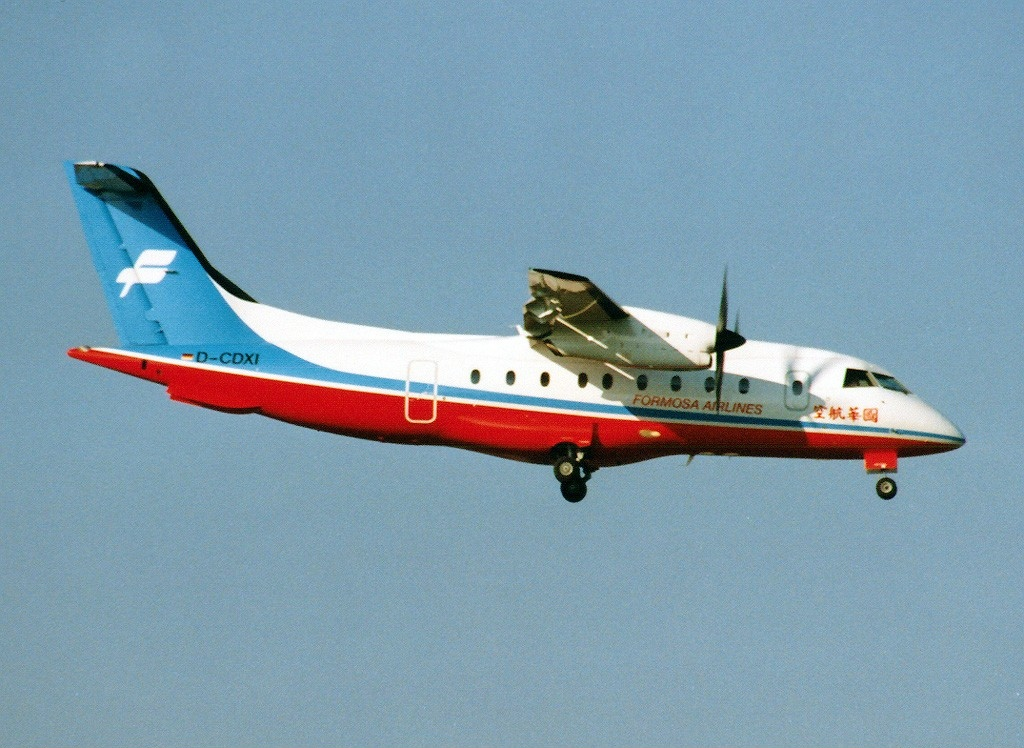
Formosa Airlines Dornier 328-110 in 1996

The company was founded on 5 May 1966 as Yung Shing Airlines (Chinese: 永興航空; pinyin: Yǒngxīng Hángkōng), and revenue operations commenced on 1 July. For the first decade of its existence, only crop dusting services were offered, before turning towards passenger flights. With its small fleet of Britten-Norman Islander and Cessna 404s, Yung Shing Airlines served a number of domestic destinations, most notably linking Taitung City with outlying Orchid Island and Green Island. In 1983, the Dornier 228 joined the fleet, which would remain an important part for the airline's operations throughout the years.

On 8 August 1987, the company was renamed Formosa Airlines (reflecting the historic name for Taiwan) and moved its headquarters to Taipei, with the city's Songshan Airport becoming its primary base. In 1988, Formosa Airlines became the first Far Eastern operator of the Saab 340, with a capacity of 37 passengers its by then-largest aircraft type. By 1996, this subfleet had grown to nine planes. Plans for turning the airline into a Hong Kong-registered company in order to be able to transport passengers between Taiwan and China were brought forth in 1989, but did not materialize. Formosa Airlines became a jet aircraft operator in 1995, when two 109-seat Fokker 100s were acquired, along with five smaller Fokker 50 turboprop airliners.

In July 1996, China Airlines acquired a 41 percent stake in Formosa Airlines and took over the management, aiming at thus improving Formosa's inferior safety record (see below) and developing Kaohsiung International Airport into a domestic hub. When EVA Air, the major competitor of China Airlines, merged its domestic subsidiaries to create Uni Air in 1998, a similar merger was announced for Formosa Airlines and Mandarin Airlines, with the latter name to be kept. On 8 August 1999, the merger was finalized: Formosa Airlines with its then 620 employees and a number of short haul aircraft were combined with Mandarin's, with all long haul planes of Mandarin Airlines being handed over to China Airlines.

== Destinations ==
During the 1990s, Formosa Airlines operated scheduled flights to the following domestic destinations:

Formosa Airlines destinations
Location	Airport(s)
Green Island	Lyudao Airport
Hualien City	Hualien Airport
Kaohsiung City	Kaohsiung International Airport (secondary base)
Kinmen	Kinmen Airport
Magong	Magong Airport
Orchid Island	Lanyu Airport
Qimei	Qimei Airport
Taichung	Taichung Airport
Taipei	Taipei Songshan Airport (primary base)
Taitung City	Taitung Airport

== Accidents and incidents ==
- On 9 October 1983, a Britten-Norman Islander (registered B-12202) of Yung Shing Airlines was damaged beyond repair in a landing incident at Orchid Island Airport. The twelve people on board survived.
- Another accident at Orchid Island involving a Formosa Airlines aircraft (the company had been renamed by then) occurred on 14 August 1990. A cargo-configured Dornier 228 (registered B-12268) was approaching the airport when it crashed 15 meters short of the runway threshold, killing the two pilots.
- On June 27, 1989, a Cessna 404 was climbing but the engine failed, the airline crashed into a residential area near Kaohsiung Airport killing 11 of the 12 onboard and 1 fatality on the ground, the cause was an engine failure.
- On 28 February 1993, the six people—two pilots and four passengers—on board a Dornier 228 (registered B-12238) died when the aircraft crashed into the sea during a landing attempt at Orchid Island in heavy rain.
- Another Formosa Airlines Dornier 228 (registered B-12298) was damaged beyond repair when its undercarriage collided with an airport fence in a landing attempt at Green Island Airport on 14 June 1993. The 20 passengers and two pilots that had been on the scheduled passenger flight from Taitung City survived.
- In 1995, Formosa Airlines suffered the write-off of two of its Dornier 228s in only three days. On 15 June, a belly landing incident occurred at Taitung Airport at 15:07 local time. The airplane with the registration B-12288 had originated at Green Island. On 18 June, the pilots of the airliner registered B-12208 lost control during taxiing at Green Island Airport, resulting in the Dornier running into a ditch. Each flight had 17 passengers on board, all of which survived.
- On 5 April 1996, six passengers of Flight 7613 from Taipei lost their lives when the aircraft, a Dornier 228 registered B-12257, crashed into the sea off Matsu Beigan Airport at 16:25 local time. In poor visibility conditions, the pilots had descended too steeply. There were eleven survivors.
- The worst accident in the history of Formosa Airlines happened on 10 August 1997, again on the Taipei-Matsu route. At 08:33 local time, Flight 7601 (a Dornier 228, registered B-12256) hit treetops and a water tower following an aborted landing attempt in a heavy rainstorm. All persons on board (two pilots and fourteen passengers) died when the airplane crashed 1 kilometer off Matsu Beigan Airport and erupted into fire.
- Following another air disaster of Flight 7623, killing 13 people on 18 March 1998, Formosa Airlines was grounded until 1 April, as it was determined that the pilots had not complied with the standard operating procedure. The Saab 340 (registered B-12255) with eight passengers and five crew members on board crashed a few minutes into a scheduled passenger flight from Hsinchu to Kaohsiung, at 19:32 local time. During the pre-flight check, the pilots had noticed that several systems were unavailable, including the autopilot and electronic flight instrument system (EFIS). Violating the minimum equipment list, according to which the aircraft should have been considered to be in a non-flyable condition, the pilots decided to take-off nevertheless. In flight, the aircraft proved to behave in an unpredicted way, as the leading edges of the wings could not be kept at equal temperatures because of the failing bleed air supply, causing a loss of control.

== See also ==
- List of defunct airlines of Taiwan
