= Formosa Airlines Flight 7613 =

1996 aviation accident

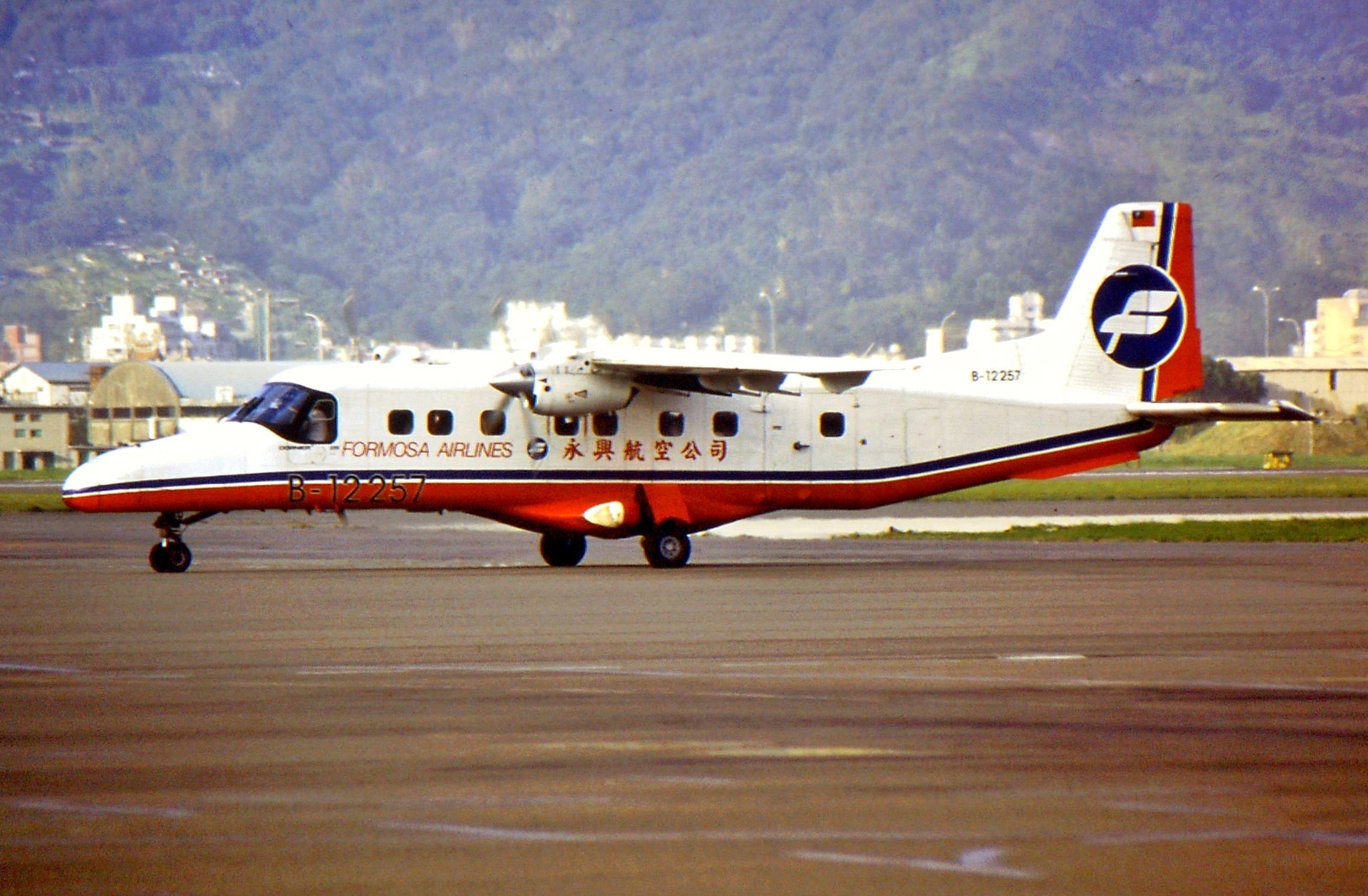
- B-12257, The aircraft involved in the accident in October 1994

Accident
- Date: April 5, 1996
- Summary: Controlled flight into terrain due to pilot error
- Site: Beigan Airport, Beigan, Lienchiang, Matsu Islands, Taiwan

Aircraft
- Aircraft type: Dornier 228
- Operator: Formosa Airlines
- Registration: B-12257
- Flight origin: Songshan Airport
- Destination: Beigan Airport
- Occupants: 17
- Passengers: 15
- Crew: 2
- Fatalities: 6
- Injuries: 11
- Survivors: 11

Formosa Airlines Flight 7613 was an aviation accident that killed six people on 5 April 1996 in Beigan, Matsu Islands, Fujian, Taiwan.

== Accident ==
The aircraft, a Dornier 228-212 (registration B-12257), crashed on approach to Beigan Airport in poor visibility. All 17 occupants survived the initial impact, but six passengers drowned. Both crew members and the remaining nine passengers survived.

== Investigation ==
The flight crew had failed to monitor the aircraft's altitude and improperly opened the emergency exits, causing the aircraft to fill with water.
