= Dornier 228 =

Transport aircraft family by Dornier

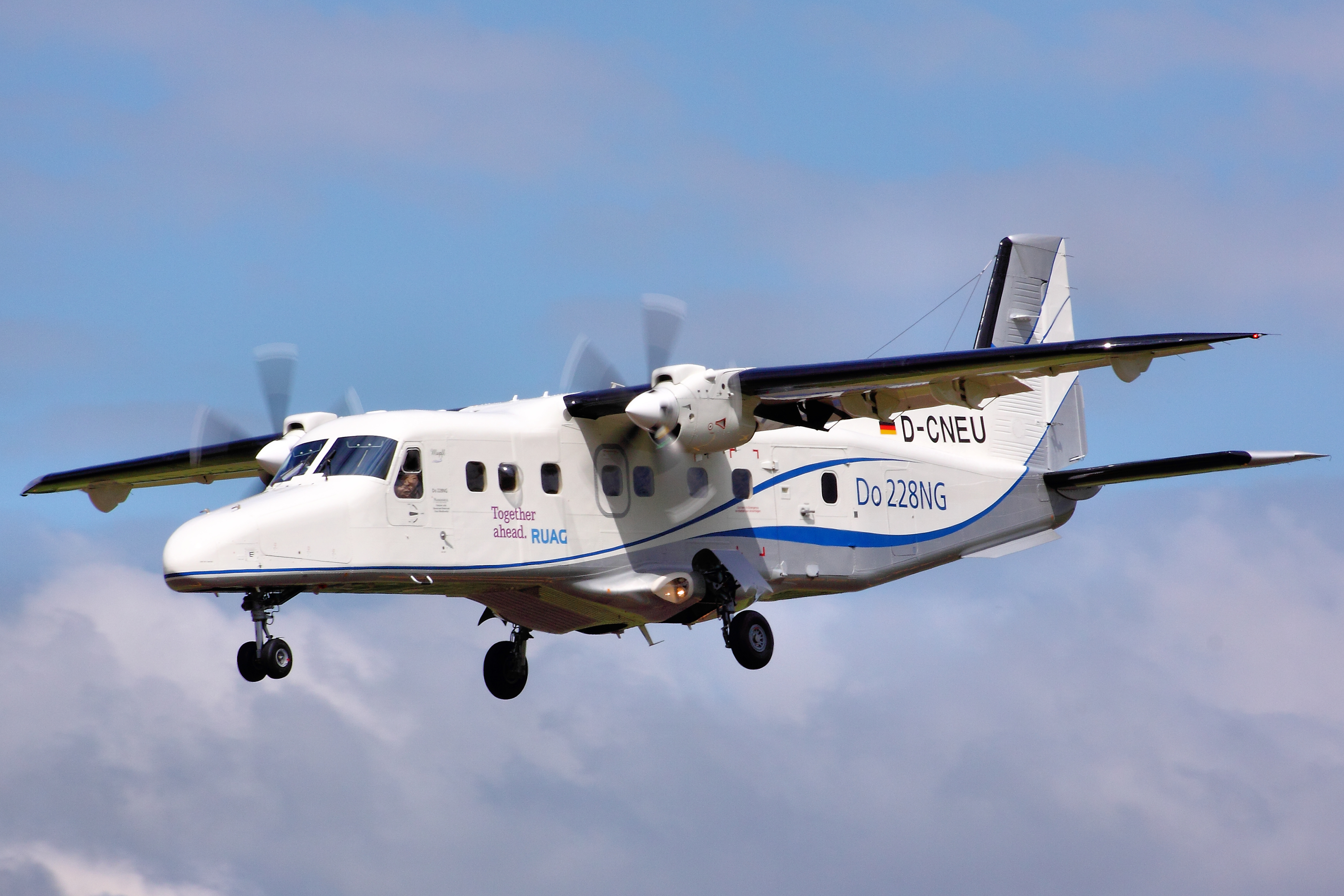
- A RUAG Dornier 228NG in 2012

General information
- Type: Utility aircraft
- Manufacturer: Dornier GmbH; RUAG; General Atomics AeroTec Systems GmbH
- Built by: Hindustan Aeronautics Limited
- Status: In service
- Primary users: Indian Air Force Indian Coast Guard; Indian Navy
- Number built: Dornier: 245; HAL: 125

History
- Manufactured: Dornier: 1982–1997; HAL: 1985–present RUAG: 2010–2020; General Atomics: 2021-Present
- Introduction date: July 1982
- First flight: 28 March 1981
- Developed from: Dornier Do 28

The Dornier 228 is a twin-turboprop STOL utility aircraft, designed and first manufactured by Dornier GmbH (later DASA Dornier, Fairchild-Dornier) from 1981 until 1998. About 245 such aircraft were built in Oberpfaffenhofen, Germany. In 1983, Hindustan Aeronautics Limited (HAL) bought a production licence and manufactured 125 aircraft in Kanpur, India.

Swiss manufacturer RUAG acquired the rights of the aircraft from Fairchild in 2002, and introduced the Dornier 228 NG variant in 2009. The fuselage, wings, and tail assembly were manufactured by HAL in Kanpur, and were transported to Oberpfaffenhofen, where RUAG carried out the final assembly. It used the same airframe as its predecessor with a new five-blade propeller, improved avionics, glass cockpit, and was capable of flying a longer range.

In late 2017, HAL announced the introduction of a new civilian variant Hindustan-Dornier 228 for operations in India. In 2020, RUAG sold the Dornier 228 to AeroTec Systems, a subsidiary of US-based General Atomics. General Atomics announced plans to resume production of a new version Do228 NXT.

== Development ==
=== Origins ===
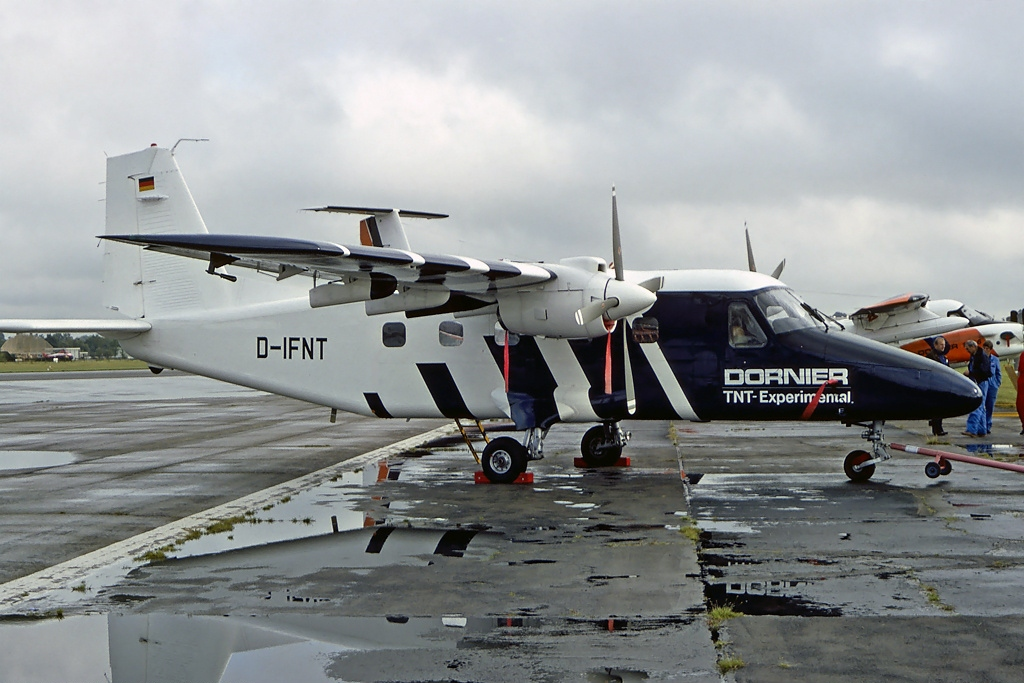
Experimental modified Do-28E with the 'New Technology Wing' in 1980

In the late 1970s, Dornier GmbH developed a new kind of wing, the TNT (Tragflügel neuer Technologie – New Technology Wing), under a project subsidized by the German Government. A Dornier Do 28 aircraft, equipped with two Pratt & Whitney Canada PT6 turboprop engines, was fitted with the modified wing. Later, Dornier fitted the aircraft with two Garrett AiResearch TPE-331-5 engines, and named it Dornier 128. The company developed two variants of the aircraft with a redesigned fuselage. The 15- and 19-seater aircraft were named as E-1 (later Dornier 228-100) and E-2 (later Dornier 228-200) respectively. Dornier put the new aircraft on stationary display at the ILA Berlin Air Show in 1980. The prototypes were flown for the first time on 28 March 1981 and 9 May 1981 respectively.

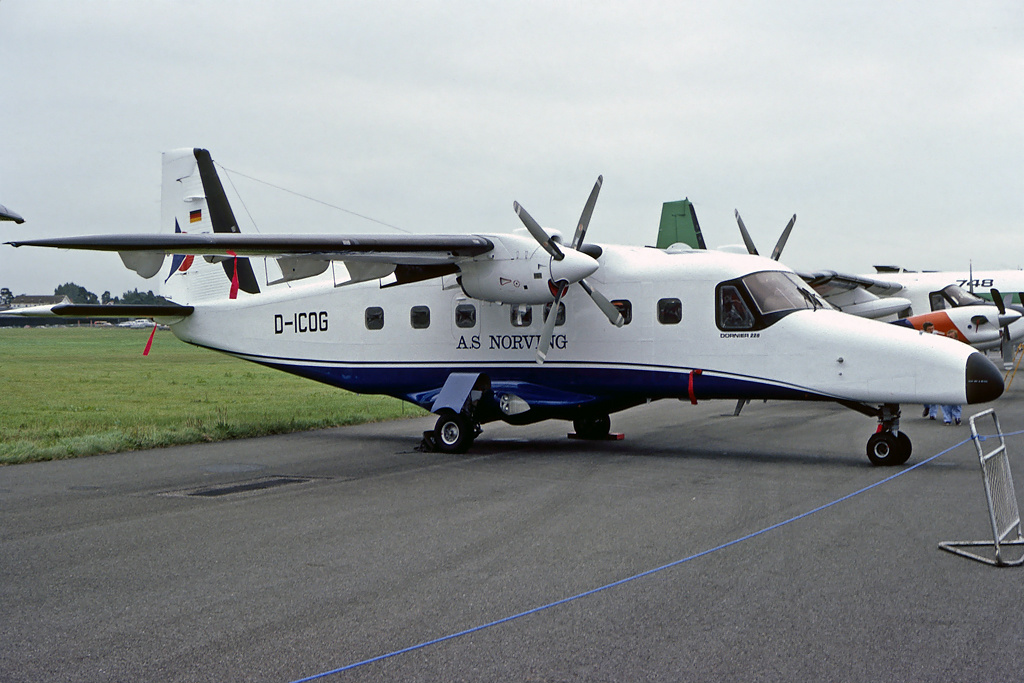
Dornier 228 prototype at Farnborough airport in 1982

After the type certification by German authorities was granted on 18 December 1981, the Dornier 228-100 entered commercial service with Norving in July 1982. The larger Dornier 228-200 entered service with Jet Charters in late 1982. The aircraft was certified by the British and American aviation authorities followed on 17 April and 11 May 1984 respectively. By 1983, the production rate was about three aircraft per month, and Dornier targeted a output of 300 aircraft by the end of the 1980s.

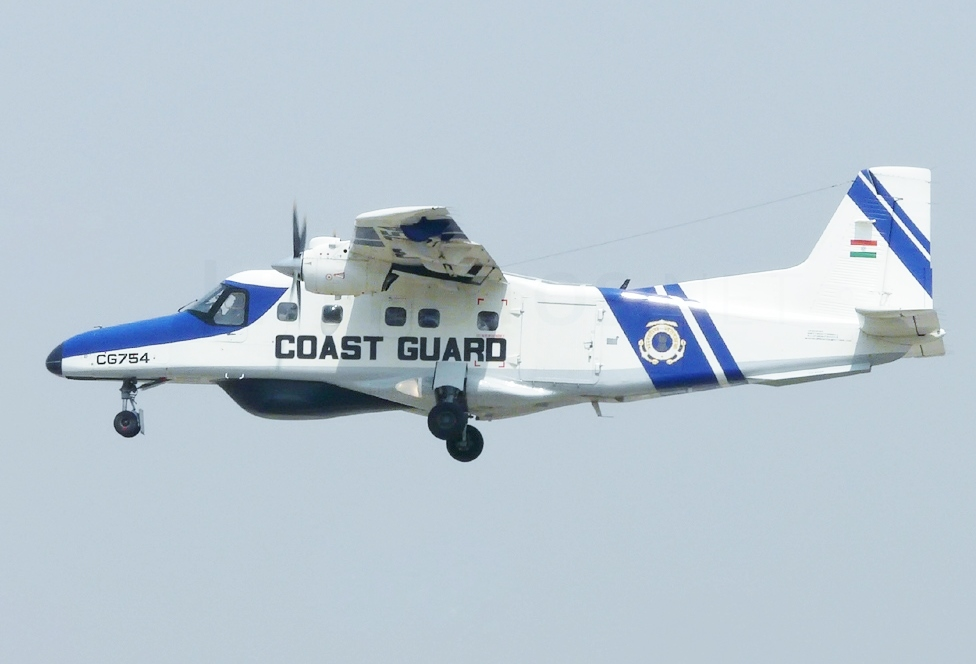
An Indian Coast Guard Do-228 licence produced by Hindustan Aeronautics Limited

In November 1983, Dornier signed a license-production and phased technology-transfer agreement with Hindustan Aeronautics Limited. A production line was established in Kanpur, India, and the first aircraft rolled out of the facility in 1985. By 2014, 125 Dornier 228s had been produced in India. Over the years, Dornier offered various variants of the aircraft, fitted with optional equipment to several operators. In 1996, Dornier announced the ceasing of operations in Germany, and the transfer of all manufacturing operations to India. In 1998, activity on the German production line was halted, in part to concentrate on the production of the larger Fairchild-Dornier 328 and in response to Dornier's wider financial difficulties.

=== Dornier 228NG ===
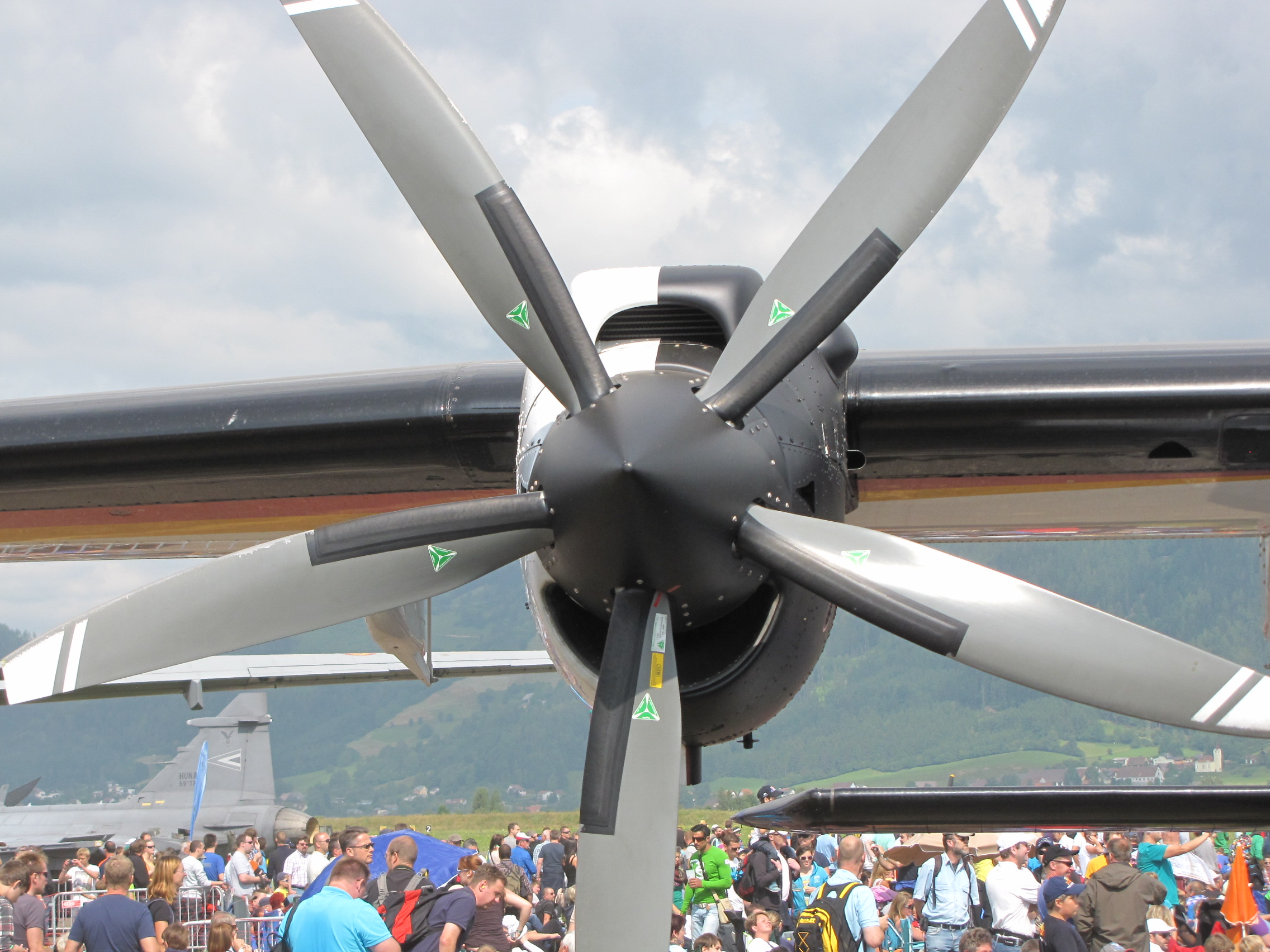
The main outside change of the 228NG is the five-bladed propeller.

In 2002, Swiss company RUAG took over the services and components divisions from Fairchild Dornier, including the production rights of Dornier 228. RUAG acquired the type certificate for the aircraft in 2003. In December 2007, it announced an intention to launch a modernized version of the aircraft, designated as the Dornier 228NG. At the 2008 Berlin Air Show, HAL agreed on a ten-year contract worth €80 million for the supply of fuselage, wings and tail assembly. The final assembly of the aircraft was carried out in Germany. The main changes from the previous production model were more powerful engines, a new five-blade propeller made of composite material, and an advanced glass cockpit featuring electronic instrument displays and other improved avionics.

In June 2010, the passenger version of Dornier 228NG was priced at €5.2 million. On 18 August 2010, the aircraft received its airworthiness certification from the European Aviation Safety Agency. New Central Aviation took delivery of the first NG aircraft in September 2010. However, RUAG decided to suspend production in 2013 after the completion of an initial batch of eight aircraft. In 2014, RUAG signed an agreement with the Tata Group for the latter to become a key supplier of the program. Production restarted in 2015, with a plan to produce four aircraft annually from 2016. In February 2016, RUAG announced the beginning of serial production of the aircraft at its German production line starting in mid-2016. The assembly line was reportedly capable of producing a maximum of 12 aircraft per year.

=== Hindustan-Dornier 228 ===
In late 2017, the Indian Directorate General of Civil Aviation issued a type certificate to the Hindustan-Dornier 228 to be manufactured by HAL. The aircraft, which had been license produced by HAL for the Indian Armed Forces was permitted to be operated for commercial purposes after modifications by HAL. The aircraft was manufactured at the HAL facility in Kanpur, and made its public debut in the 2020 Dubai Airshow. The civilian version consists of 17-seater and 19-seater variants. HAL also unveiled a business variant, and an air ambulance model of the same aircraft.

In September 2022, state owned-Alliance Air signed an agreement with HAL to lease two 17-seater Dornier 228 aircraft, and the first aircraft was delivered on 7 April 2022. Alliance Air deployed the aircraft on the Dibrugarh–Pasighat route on 12 April 2022, becoming the first Indian-made aircraft to be used for civil aviation operations in India.

=== Dornier 228 NXT ===
On 30 September 2020, US firm General Atomics bought the Dornier 228 production line in Oberpfaffenhofen, including the transfer of all 450 employees, pending regulatory approval. The sale was announced on 15 October 2020, and was completed in February 2021.

=== Hybrid-electric demonstrators ===
In 2020, German Aerospace Center announced a project to modify one of its two Dornier 228 aircraft into a technology demonstrator for hybrid electric aircraft in colloboration with MTU Aero Engines, with plans for testing in 2026.

On 19 January 2023, ZeroAvia flew its Dornier 228 testbed for 10 minutes with one TPE331 turboprop replaced by a prototype hydrogen-electric powertrain consisting of two fuel cells and a lithium-ion battery. On 24 July 2024, KLM and ZeroAvia announced a partnership to work towards a demonstration flight using ZeroAvia's ZA2000 hydrogen-electric hybrid engines, with plans to conduct initial tests in 2026.

== Design ==
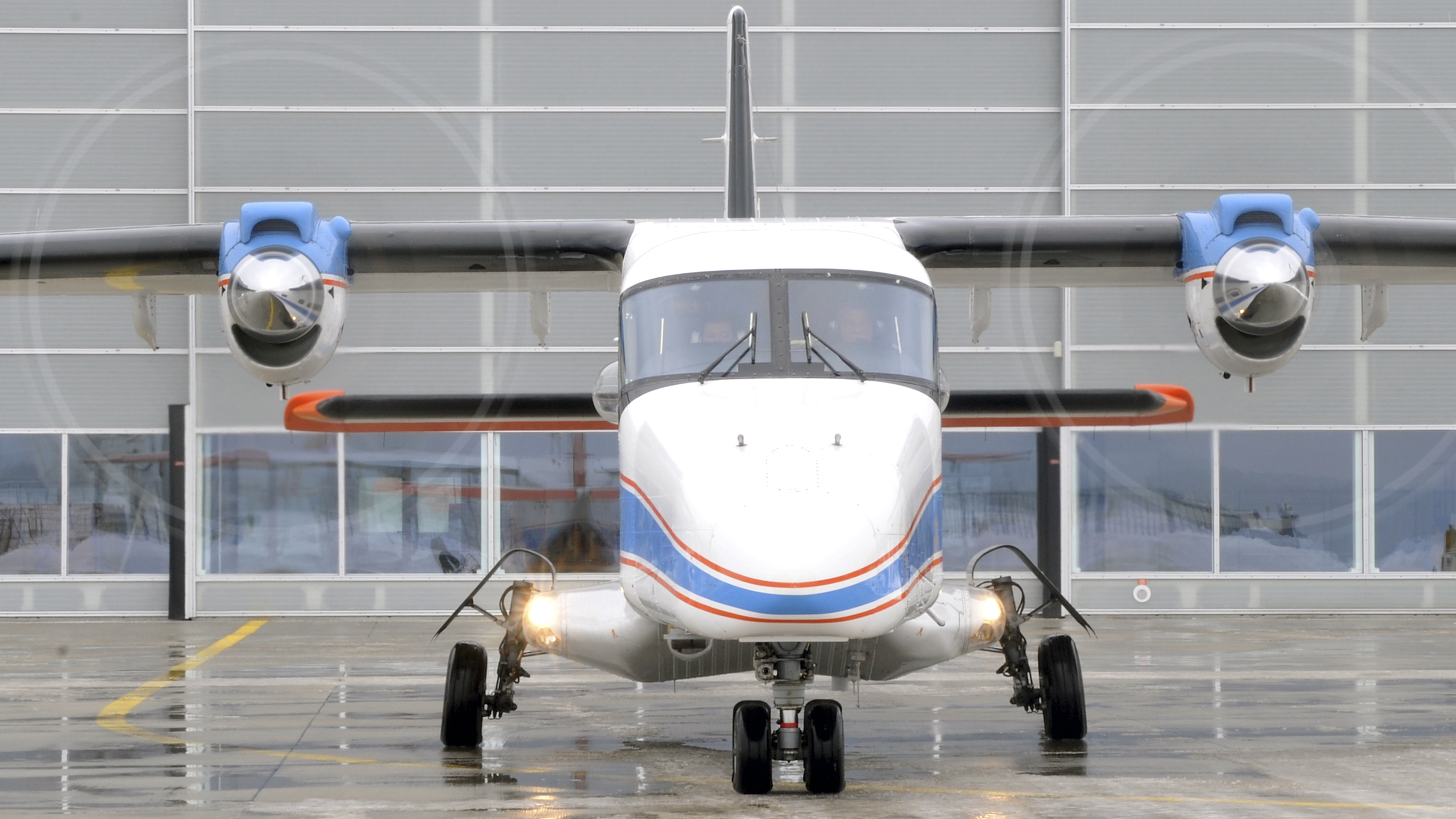
Head-on view showing the rectangular fuselage

The Dornier 228 is a twin-engine general purpose aircraft, capable of transporting up to 19 passengers or cargo. It is powered by a pair of Garrett TPE331 turboprop engines. The aircraft has a rectangular fuselage with large side-loading doors, making it suitable for cargo and utility operations. The aircraft is known for its versatility, low operational costs, and a high level of reliability (99%). As per its manufacturer, no other comparable aircraft in the class can carry as much capacity over a comparable distance at the speeds operated by the Dornier 228.

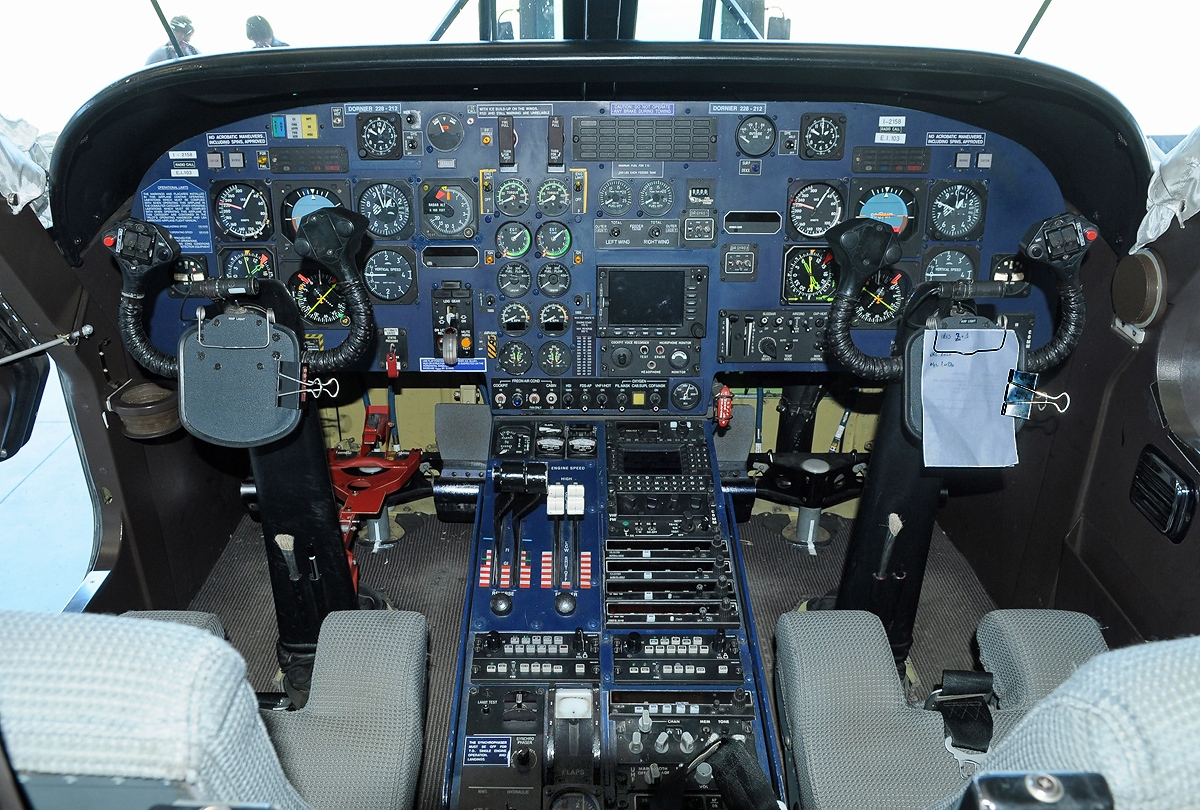
Analog flight deck of the pre-NG variants

Dornier 228 is commonly classified as a Short Takeoff and Landing (STOL) aircraft, capable of operating from shorter and unpaved runways. This capability is largely attributed to the type's supercritical wing which generates a higher lift at slower speeds. The wing is atypical and one of the more distinguishing features of the aircraft. It is in the form of a rectangular box formed from four integrally-milled alloy panels. Kevlar is used for the ribs, stringers, trailing edge and fowler flaps, with the wing's leading edge made of conventional alloy sheet metal. Benefits of this wing over conventional methodology include an estimated 15% reduction in weight, the elimination of large number of rivets, and lowering the per-aircraft manufacturing workload by roughly 340 man hours. Both the fuselage and tail are of a conventional design, but make use of chemical milling in order to save weight.

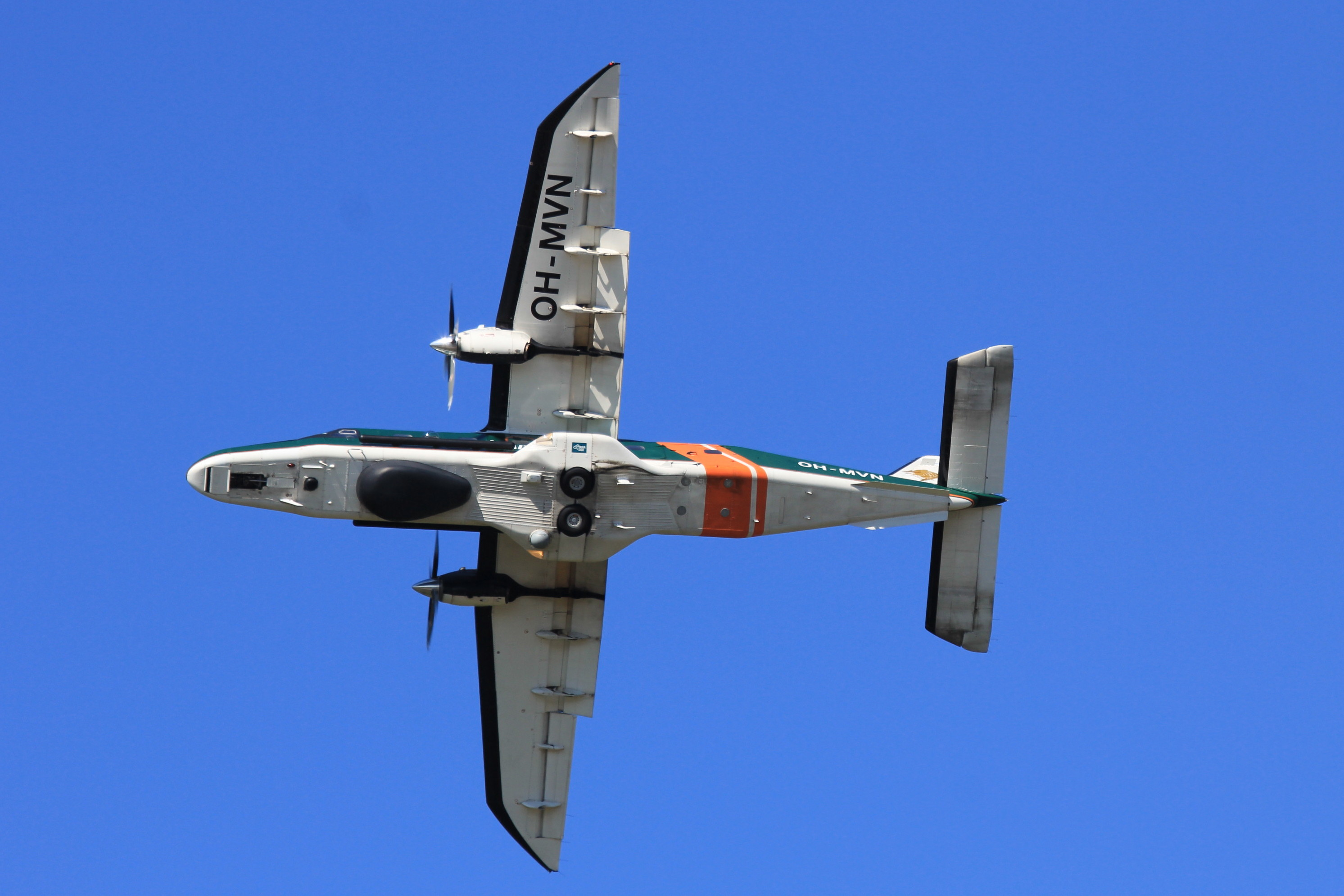
Maritime patrol version with a radome under the fuselage

The Dornier 228 has been promoted in various capacities, including as a commuter aircraft, a military transporter, cargo hauler, or as a special missions aircraft. Special missions include maritime surveillance, border patrol, medevac, search and rescue, paradrop and environmental research missions, in which capacity the type has proven useful due to a ten-hour flight endurance, a wide operating range, low operational cost, and varied equipment range. Special equipment available to be installed include a 360-degree surveillance radar, side-looking airborne radar, forward-looking infrared sensor, search light, operator station, real-time datalink, enlarged fuel tanks, satellite uplink, stretches, air-openable roller door, and infrared/ultraviolet sensors. In addition to a 19-seat commuter configuration for airlines, a business configuration is also offered, in which the cabin is customized as per client specifications. The Dornier 228 is the only aircraft of its class to be fitted with air conditioning as standard.

=== Dornier 228NG ===
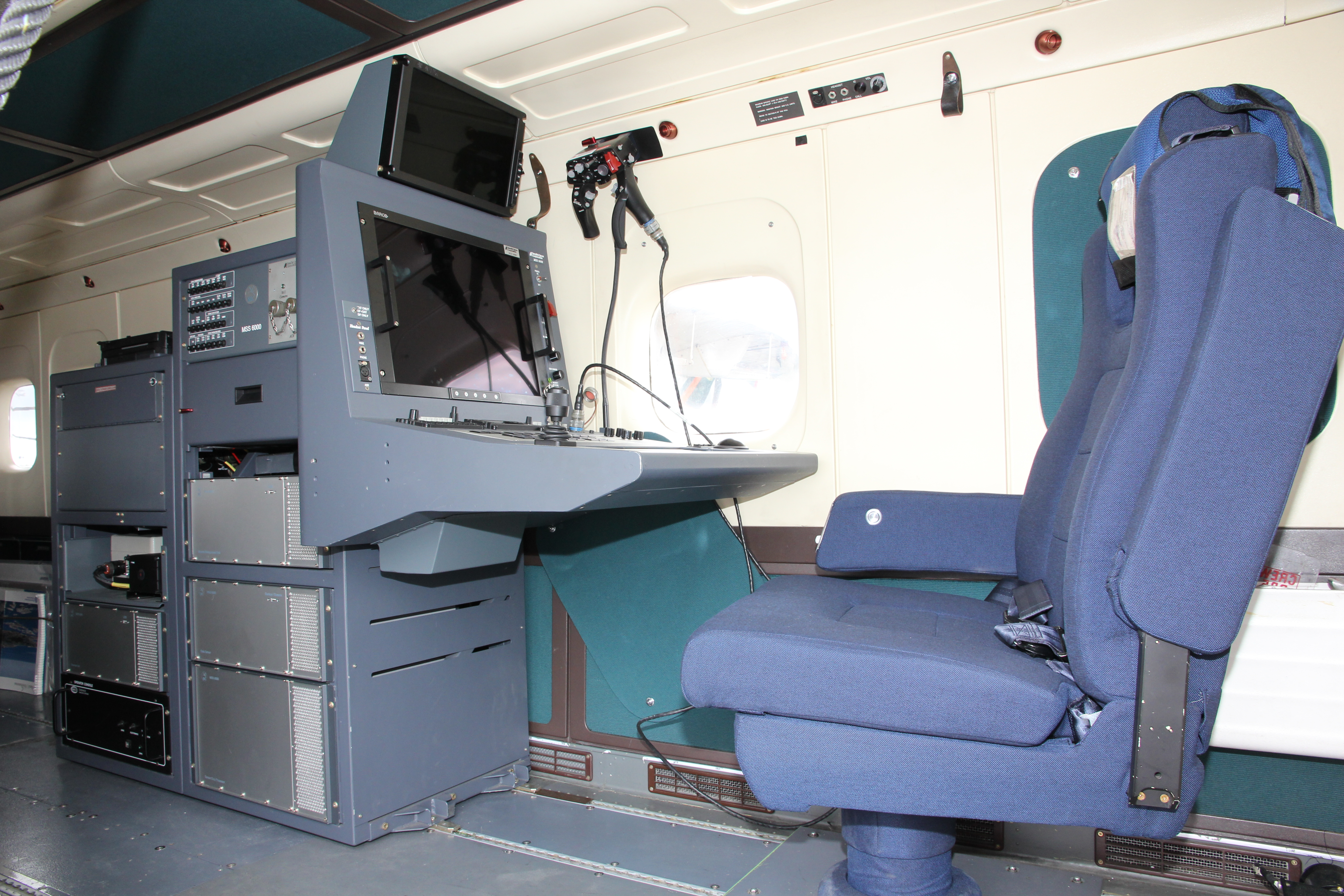
Radar console for maritime patrol

More than 350 design changes were incorporated in the re-launched Dornier 228 NG. Amongst the principal changes is the adoption of Universal UNS-1 glass cockpit, which enables the aircraft to be flown under single-pilot instrument flight rules in addition to visual flight rules. According to RUAG, the Dornier 228NG is the first aircraft in its class to be certified with equivalent electronics. Four large displays are used in the cockpit, which includes two primary flight displays and two multi-function displays, to present key flight data. The navigation system includes VHF omnidirectional range, distance measuring equipment, automatic direction finder, radar altimeter, Global Positioning System, air data computer, and a flight management system. A three-axis autopilot can be optionally incorporated, as can a weather radar and high frequencyradio. While designed for two-pilot operation, the Dornier 228NG can be flown by a single crew member.

The Garrett TPE331-10 engines in the NG aircraft are optimized for the redesigned five-bladed fibre-propellers, which are more efficient, quick to start, and produces less vibration and noise than the original metal four-bladed predecessor. It has the longest time between overhaul of any comparable 19-seat aircraft, reportedly up to 7,000 hours. The aircraft is also equipped with an engine-indicating and crew-alerting system, and optional safety equipment such as airborne collision avoidance system and terrain awareness and warning system. In standard configuration, the aircraft uses 360 lb (160 kg) of fuel per hour while cruising at 120 kn (220 km/h) at an altitude of 8,000 ft (2,400 m).

== Operators ==
As of July 2018, the Dornier fleet accumulated over four million flight hours, and 57 aircraft were in commercial service. Other operators include police, law enforcement, paramilitary operators and military operators.

== Accidents and incidents ==
The Dornier 228 has been involved in 54 aviation accidents and incidents including 41 hull losses, which have resulted in 205 fatalities.

Accidents
Date	Flight	Fat.	Location	Event	Surv.
26 March 1982	Dornier	3	Germany, near Igenhausen	Prototype test flight, loss of control	0
24 February 1985	AWI Polar 3	3	West Sahara, near Dakhla	Shot down by the Polisario Front guerrillas	0
23 September 1989	Vayudoot PF624	11	India, near Indapur	Loss of control	0
18 April 1991	Air Tahiti 805	10	French Polynesia, near Nuku Hiva	Engine failure on approach not acknowledged then ditching	12
2 January 1993	Indian Coast Guard	4	India, near Paradip	Crashed into sea	2
28 February 1993	Formosa Airlines	6	Taiwan, near Orchid Island	Struck the sea while approaching Orchid Island in heavy rain	0
31 July 1993	Everest Air	19	Nepal, near Bharatpur Airport	Controlled Flight Into Terrain (Mountain) while on approach	0
5 April 1996	Formosa 7613	6	Taiwan, near Matsu Airport	Crashed while attempting to land	11
10 August 1997	Formosa 7601	16	Taiwan, near Matsu Airport	Crashed while attempting to land	0
6 September 1997	Royal Brunei 839	10	Malaysia, near Miri Airport	Crashed at Lambir Hills National Park on approach	0
30 July 1998	Indian Airlines 503	6 + 3	India, Cochin airport	Poor stabiliser maintenance, loss of control, 3 killed on ground	0
7 August 1999	TACV Flight 5002	18	Cape Verde, Santo Antão Airport	Controlled Flight Into Terrain – Mountain	0
17 September 2006	Nigerian Air Force	13	Nigeria, near Vandeikya	Controlled Flight Into Terrain – Mountain	5
24 August 2010	Agni Air Flight 101	14	Nepal, near Shikharpur, Narayani	Controlled Flight Into Terrain – Mountain	0
14 May 2012	Agni Air Flight CHT	15	Nepal, near Jomsom Airport	Crashed while attempting to land	6
28 September 2012	Sita Air Flight 601	19	Nepal, near Kathmandu Airport	Engine bird strike, crashed and burned shortly after takeoff	0
9 September 2013	CorpFlite	2	Chile, near Viña del Mar Airport	Crashed into power lines whilst attempting to land in fog	0
24 March 2015	Indian Navy	2	Indian Ocean, near Goa, India	Believed to have plunged into the sea after technical problems	1
8 June 2015	Indian Coast Guard	3	Indian Ocean, near Pichavaram	Crashed into sea, located on 10 July, 16.5 nmi off coast	0
29 August 2015	Nigerian Air Force	7	Kaduna, Nigeria	Crashed into a house and burned near departure airport	0
24 November 2019	Busy Bee Congo	21 + 6	Goma, DR Congo	Crashed on takeoff from Goma Airport	1
10 June 2024	Malawi Defence Force	9	Chikangawa Forest Reserve, Malawi	Crashed en route from Lilongwe to Mzuzu	0

== Specifications (Dornier 228NG) ==
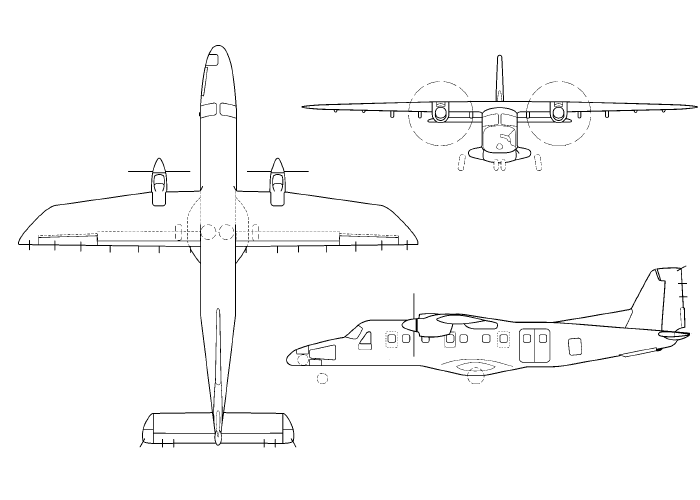
3-view line drawing of the Dornier 228

Data from RUAG

General characteristics

- Crew: 2
- Capacity: 19 passengers
- Length: 16.56 m (54 ft 4 in)
- Wingspan: 16.97 m (55 ft 8 in)
- Height: 4.86 m (15 ft 11 in)
- Wing area: 32 m^{2} (340 sq ft)
- Airfoil: Do A-5
- Empty weight: 3,900 kg (8,598 lb)
- Max takeoff weight: 6,575 kg (14,495 lb)
- Fuel capacity: 1,885 kg (4,156 lb)
- Powerplant: 2 × Honeywell TPE331-10 turboprop, 579 kW (776 shp) each
- Propellers: 5-bladed MT-Propeller, 2.5 m (8 ft 2 in) diameter fully-feathering constant-speed propellers

Performance

- Cruise speed: 413 km/h (257 mph, 223 kn)
- Stall speed: 137 km/h (85 mph, 74 kn)
- Range: 396 km (246 mi, 214 nmi) with 1,960 kg (4,321 lb) payload
- Ferry range: 2,363 km (1,468 mi, 1,276 nmi) with 547 kg (1,206 lb) payload
- Endurance: 10 hours
- Service ceiling: 7,620 m (25,000 ft)
- Fuel consumption: 0.945 kg/km (3.35 lb/mi) at 413 km/h (257 mph; 223 kn) IAS
- Take-off run: 792 m (2,600 ft) (MTOW, ISA, SL)
- Landing run: 451 m (1,480 ft) (MLW, ISA, SL)

== See also ==
Related development

- Dornier Do 28
- Dornier 328

Aircraft of comparable role, configuration, and era

- Antonov An-28/PZL M28
- Beechcraft 99
- CASA C-212 Aviocar
- Cessna SkyCourier
- de Havilland Canada DHC-6 Twin Otter
- Embraer EMB 110 Bandeirante
- GAF Nomad
- Harbin Y-12
- IAI Arava
- Let L-410 Turbolet
- Short SC.7 Skyvan

Related lists

- List of civil aircraft
- List of STOL aircraft
