= Julia Melim =

Brazilian actress

- Born: Julia dos Santos Melim Coelho; Florianópolis, Brazil
- Occupation: Actress
- Years active: 2001–present
- Website: www.juliamelim.com

Julia Melim is a Brazilian TV host, actress and producer of Italian descent. She is known as the TV host and NY correspondent at Hollywood TV. Her works include the film Death of Evil directed by Damian Chapa, Sofia Coppola's latest film Somewhere Executive Produced by Francis Ford Coppola and The Incredible Hulk with Edward Norton directed by Louis Leterrier.

== Early life ==
Melim was born Julia dos Santos Melim Coelho in Florianópolis to real estate developer Mirian Melim and architect Mario Cesar Coelho. Many people associate her to fiction writer Paulo Coelho for sharing the same last name, even though they are not directly related. She grew up in Rio de Janeiro, Brazil in a Catholic household and attended the St. Patrick's Irish Catholic boarding school. She speaks fluent Portuguese, Spanish and English. She started acting at the early age of 4 when she began performing for her family, but it was not until she was a teenager, at the age of 13, that she made her professional debut playing Beth in the theater production The Crucible by Arthur Miller. She is very proud of her Brazilian heritage and has said in an interview for the Paul Berenson Show that "we are always finding a way to celebrate the good things," as one of the most important lessons she takes away from her Brazilian upbringing.

== Career ==
She appeared with Stephen Dorff in the 2010 feature Somewhere, directed by Sofia Coppola. She also played a lead role in the feature Death of Evil directed by Damian Chapa released in October 2009, and was in the features Blood Bond directed by Frank E. Garcia and The Incredible Hulk. She also wrote, directed, and starred in the film Hard to Quit, which premiered at the first edition of the Los Angeles Brazilian Film Festival. She is producing and will be starring in the film Made in Brasil to be shot in Rio and has other features currently in development. She believes that "acting is how she does her share to help build a better world."

== Awards and Humanitarian Projects ==
In 2001, she was in the theater production Journey to the Center of the Earth produced by Marcelo Serrado, which won the Shell Award (Premio Shell), comparable to the Tony Award in the U.S. She also worked as an actress and assistant director for acclaimed director Augusto Boal at CTO-Rio, who was nominated for the Nobel Prize in 2008. In recognition of her work, she was invited to represent the United Nations (UNESCO) as a resident artist in India working with a theater group in Chennai. She then received an acting scholarship, which prompted her move to the U.S. and allowed her to earn a B.A. in Theater & Film from The University of Kansas and a B.S. in Journalism which she then completed at California State University, Northridge. She has been contributing to SoulBrasil Magazine writing about cinema since 2006. She was Miss Brazil at the Miss Panamerican International 2008 in Los Angeles. She expressed her passion toward human rights, immigration rights, healthcare reform and her concern with the environment in her interview for the Paul Berenson Show. She also supports education reform in Brazil and has stated that one of her goals is to change Brazilian social reality and "help children make their dreams come true" as the spokesperson for the Bravo Youth Foundation.

== Filmography ==
=== Film ===
Year	Title	Role
2007	The Devil is an Ass	Lust
2008	Beatnik Girls	Mildred
2008	Blood Bond	Catherine
2009	Death of Evil	Karla Aster
2010	Euro-Central	Julia Mann
2010	Somewhere	Sarah
2010	Garbo	Salka Viertel
2011	Maracas: the Carmen Miranda Story (Made in Brasil)	Aurora Miranda

=== Television ===
Year	Title
1999	Malhaçao
2001	The Clone
2002	Os Normais

=== Music videos ===
Year	Role	Video
2008	Beautiful Girl	"What a Wonderful World" By Bob Sinclar
2010	Universal Girl	"Universal Man" By Jay Blaze Ft. Ray J
