= Formosa Airlines Flight 7623 =

1998 aviation accident

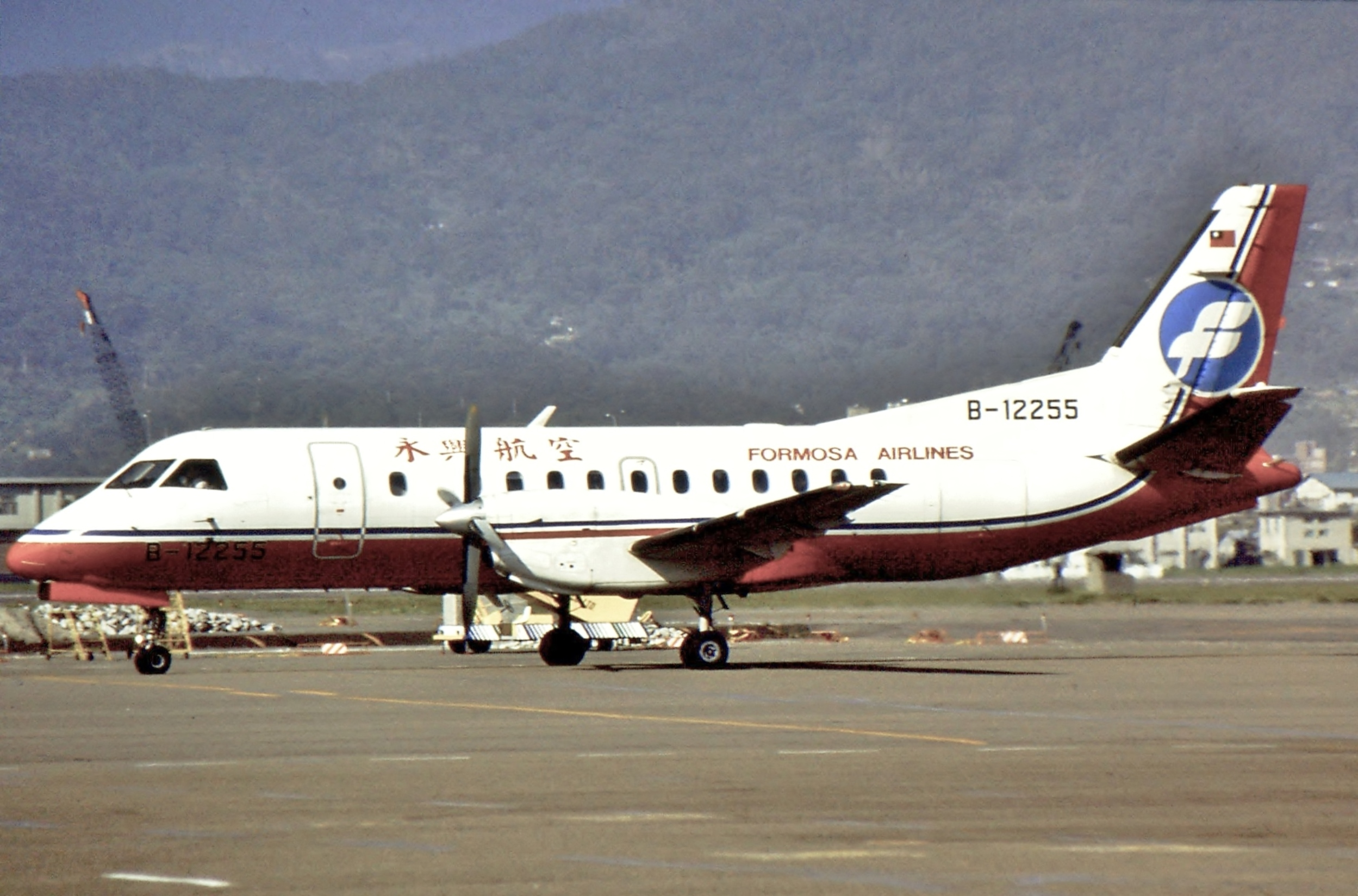
- B-12255, the aircraft involved in the accident, seen in 1994

Accident
- Date: 18 March 1998
- Summary: Spatial disorientation, loss of control and subsequent crash due to electrical failure
- Site: 9 kilometers northwest from Hsinchu Airport, Taiwan; 24°54′33″N 120°53′12″E

Aircraft
- Aircraft type: Saab 340B
- Operator: Formosa Airlines
- IATA flight No.: VY7623
- ICAO flight No.: FOS7623
- Call sign: Bravo 12255
- Registration: B-12255
- Flight origin: Hsinchu Airport, Hsinchu, Taiwan
- Destination: Kaohsiung International Airport, Kaohsiung, Taiwan
- Occupants: 13
- Passengers: 8
- Crew: 5
- Fatalities: 13
- Survivors: 0

Formosa Airlines Flight 7623 (Note: Although it was a scheduled passenger flight from Hsinchu to Kaohsiung, the accident flight did not have the necessary permits from the authorities, making it a charter flight instead. Therefore, the callsign of the flight was the registration of the aircraft (Bravo 12255) and not the flight number.) was a scheduled domestic flight from Hsinchu to Kaohsiung, Taiwan. On 18 March 1998, the Saab 340 operating the flight crashed into the ocean shortly after takeoff in a severe right bank, killing all 13 occupants on-board. The investigation determined that the failure of a crucial electrical system, combined with flying in total darkness and a low cloud ceiling, led to the loss of control of the aircraft.

== Background ==
=== Aircraft ===
The aircraft involved was a Saab 340B registered as B-12255 with serial number 337. It was manufactured on 30 April 1993 and had since then accumulated 8,076 hours and 28 minutes of flight hours. It was equipped with two General Electric CT7-9B turboprop engines, which had a combined total of 13,600 working hours.

=== Crew ===
In command was 43-year-old Captain Fei Kuo-pang, a line instructor and Air Force veteran who joined Formosa Airlines in 1989, and had logged about 11,000 total flight hours, including 6,455 hours on the Saab 340. Captain Fei had been on duty for more than 11 hours prior to the accident, and had flown a total of nine flights. The accident flight was supposed to be his last flight of the day.

The co-pilot was 28-year-old First Officer Hung Chi-ping, who had been hired by Formosa Airlines in October of the previous year and was still in line training at the time of the accident. He had only 305 total flight hours, 44 of which were on the Saab 340.

Seated in the observer's seat was 40-year-old First Officer Cheu Der-kun, also a retired Air Force pilot. He was scheduled to be on this flight to familiarize himself with the aircraft, as he had been promoted to be trained as a Saab 340 captain. He had a total of 5,588 flight hours, including 613 hours on the Saab 340. 53-year-old mechanic Wu Kai-ying was also on-board, who had been working on the Saab 340 ever since he was hired by Formosa Airlines 8 years previously.

== Flight ==
During pre-flight checks, the crew noticed a failure of the right-hand main bus, which resulted in the failure of more than 10 aircraft systems, including the right side of the Electronic Flight Instrument System (EFIS) in the cockpit, something which First Officer Hung pointed out. Captain Fei exclaimed that he had experienced the same failure in the same aircraft the day before. Even after bringing in the plane's mechanic, Wu Kai-ying, they couldn't fix the problem.

To determine whether the aircraft was safe to fly, the crew used the abnormal checklist to detect unsafe conditions, but they did not complete the entire checklist and were therefore unaware of the number of inoperative systems on-board. Captain Fei decided to continue the flight to get the plane to an airport where it could be repaired, but his statements on the Cockpit Voice Recorder (CVR) following taxi clearance revealed that he was uncomfortable with this decision.

After engine start, the right-hand anti-ice start bleed valve was in the default open position as a failsafe due to the failure of the right-hand main bus. As a result, the Internal Turbine Temperature (ITT) of engine No. 2 was 15°C higher than normal. That is, there was a difference of more than 30°C between the two engines.

=== Takeoff ===
At 19:29 local time, the plane took off from runway 05. Two seconds later, before the captain could even verify that he had reached a positive rate, he requested, "Gear up," which could be an indicator of stress. Among the inoperative systems were the autopilot and the yaw damper, which meant that the pilot in command had to fly the aircraft manually and make active rudder inputs throughout the entire flight, except that the latter was not done.

The difference in ITT had little effect on the performance of the aircraft. However, 30 seconds after takeoff, probably in an attempt to equalize the temperature difference between the two engines, the crew reduced the right Power Lever Angle (PLA). The result was a torque split of more than 13%, resulting in a yaw and roll tendency to the right due to the lower torque on engine No. 2. This required unusually large aileron and rudder inputs to maintain level flight.

To make matters worse, the aircraft was flying in Instrument Meteorological Conditions (IMC), and neither Captain Fei nor First Officer Hung were aware of their aircraft's attitude as it continued to roll to the right. Air Traffic Control (ATC) cleared the flight to turn left at a heading of 260° and maintain an altitude of 3,000 feet, and the First Officer acknowledged the request. At about this time, for undetermined reasons, the captain briefly levelled off at 2,000 feet instead. Investigators later indicated that this may have been due to either fatigue or spatial disorientation.

ATC later called and said, "Bravo 12255, turn left heading 230," and the first officer replied. At that moment, the airplane was in a 21-degree right bank on a 312-degree heading. The first officer's EFIS failure meant that he was unaware of the airplane's behavior and, although the standby instruments were operational, he did not use them or make any comments about the airplane's unusual attitude throughout the flight.

=== Accident ===
Ten seconds after First Officer Hung responded to ATC, Captain Fei exclaimed that he had a problem with the heading and asked for help with the magnetic compass. Observer Cheu replied, "Um," but neither he nor the co-pilot made any significant response, probably because they were either in a state of confusion or unable to act. The plane rolled slowly to the right at a rate of one degree per second. 13 seconds later, the captain said, "Ask for radar vector," the plane was 2.3 degrees nose down and rolling 36 degrees to the right. At that moment, he made a brief aileron input to the right, exacerbating the roll.

Captain Fei made a quick exclamation, shouting, "Everything is wrong!" The aircraft was pitching down at 8.4 degrees with a bank angle of 47.5 degrees. ATC noticed the plane's deviation to the right and asked, "Bravo 12255, say heading now?" but no one answered. The situation in the cockpit was chaotic, the aircraft was pitching down even more and rolling at an angle of 71 degrees to the right, First Officer Hung responded to the captain by asking, "Sir, shall we look at this one?". The observer then spoke up and shouted, "Attitude!" Two seconds later, ATC again asked the flight to confirm their heading, at which point the overspeed warning went off at an airspeed of 245 knots.

Observer Cheu yelled again, "Sir, attitude!" and Captain Fei replied, "OK." At that point, the plane disappeared from the ATC radar. The engines accelerated as the plane rapidly approached the Taiwan Strait. "Ah!" the captain screamed while the first officer tried to make a quick transmission of "Bra-" but was unable to finish his sentence. At 19:32, rolling inverted with a right bank angle of 161 degrees and a pitch of 65 degrees nose down, the Saab 340 slammed into the water, instantly shattering the airplane. A fisherman heard what sounded like a massive explosion but couldn't see anything. None of the 13 people on board survived.

== Investigation ==
The RH Main Bus failure meant that the airplane couldn't take off according to the MEL. However, the pilots ignored this. The flight taking place at night in Instrument Meteorological Conditions (IMC), pilot fatigue, and system failures probably contributed to the loss of situational awareness and spatial disorientation, which caused the aircraft to bank further and further to the right. The crew also failed to follow standard operating procedures.

== See also ==
- Crossair Flight 498
- Kenya Airways Flight 507
- Adam Air Flight 574
