= Peter Paliatka =

Slovak educator and sculptor

Peter Paliatka (born 1952 in Handlová, Czechoslovakia) is Slovak designer, sculptor and university pedagogue. His works include designs in serial production (transportation, industrial and product design), interior design and sculptural realizations in architecture.

== Biography ==
After high school, where he studied Spišská Nová Ves (furniture construction and interior), he studied "Tvarovanie výrobkov spotrebného priemyslu" at Vaclav Kautman's studio at the Academy of Fine Arts and Design, Bratislava (AFAD) from 1972 to 1978.

After graduation and until 1993, he worked as a pedagogue at the AFAD, first as an assistant of Kautman, later Tibor Schotter (1980–84). In 1983, he spent one year on a study exchange in Italy.

Since 1990, he was leading the AFAD's Institute of Design. 1993 was the year of his successful habituation as a university lecturer.

In 1995, Paliatka co-founded SSUŠ – Private Secondary Art School in Bratislava, where he was active as a director and pedagogue until 1998.

Since 2000, he has been leading his studio at the Institute of Industrial Design at the Faculty of Architecture of the Slovak University of Technology in Bratislava, as the head of the department.

== Works and awards ==
- Hydraulic rotary loader Detvan Hon 200, produced by PPS Group, a. s., Detva, co-authors Peter Chlpek, Peter Varga (Honor Prize, Slovak National Design Prize 2009)
- FUTURA, set of armatures for Slovak manufacturer of armatures in Myjava (Honor Prize, Slovak National Design Prize 1997)
- Children's playgrounds for Vrbové and Bratislava
- Mid-tonnage lorry, BAZ Bratislava, 1985

== Projects ==
- Project Eating with Hi-macs article on designby.sk
- Project OMS Lightning article on zahorak.sk

== Exhibitions ==
- Umenie v meste, Galéria J. Klollára, Banská Štiavnica, June 2010
- Metal Inspirations 2007, STM, Kosice, August 2007 www.usske.sk
