= Viña del Mar Airport =

Airport in Concón, Chile

- IATA: KNA; ICAO: SCVM

Summary
- Airport type: Military/public
- Serves: Greater Valparaíso
- Location: Concón, Chile
- Elevation AMSL: 461 ft / 141 m
- Coordinates: 32°57′00″S 71°28′45″W

Map
- Location of the airport in Chile

Runways
Direction	Length		Surface
Direction	m	ft	Surface
05/23	1,756	5,761	Asphalt
- Sources: WAD, GCM, Google Maps

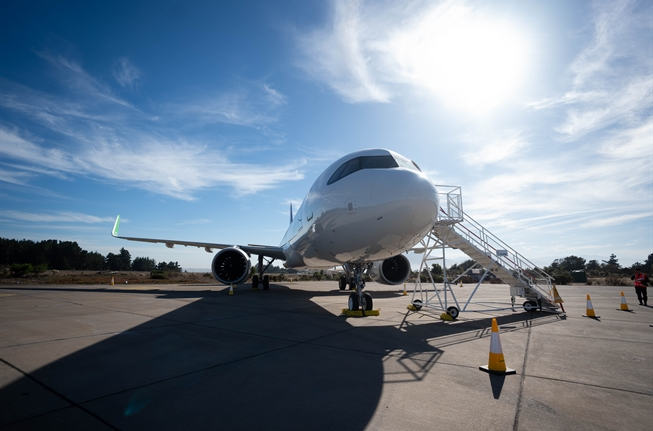
Airplane at the airport

Viña del Mar Airport (IATA: KNA, ICAO: SCVM) is an airport serving Greater Valparaíso, Chile. The airport is in the hills 4 kilometres (2.5 mi) east of the coastal commune of Concón. It mainly serves as a military air base for the Chilean Navy aviation, but also has a small civilian passenger terminal; however, this is only rarely used.

== Names ==
The airport has had several names throughout its history. It was inaugurated in 1987 as Viña del Mar Naval Air Base and Airport (Spanish: Base Aeronaval y Aeropuerto Viña del Mar), when Concón was part of Viña del Mar. After Concón regained its independence, the airport retained its name until 2015, when it was officially changed to Concón Naval Air Base and Airport (Spanish: Base Aeronaval y Aeropuerto Concón).

Torquemada Aerodrome (Spanish: Aeródromo Torquemada) has been used as an alternative name sometimes, due to its location on Torquemada Hill.

The name was changed to Viña del Mar Airport in 2024, when a project to turn it into a commercial airport started.

== Accidents and incidents ==
On 9 September 2013, a Corpflite Dornier 228, registration CC-CNW crashed into power lines while attempting to land in fog, resulting in the death of both crew members.

== See also ==
- List of airports in Chile
- Transport in Chile
