= Formosa Airlines Flight 7601 =

1997 aviation accident

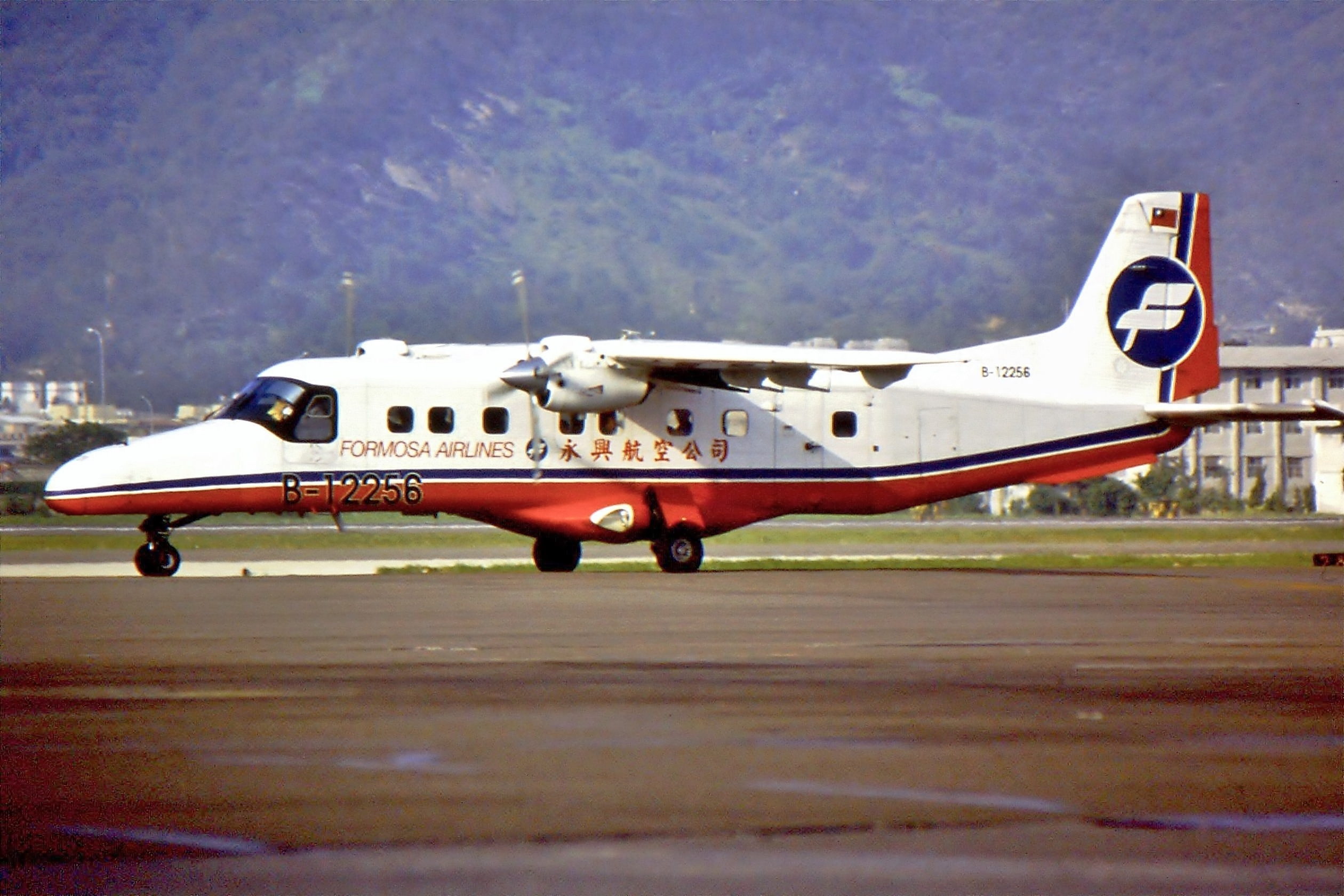
- B-12256, the aircraft involved in the accident in October 1994

Accident
- Date: 10 August 1997
- Summary: Pilot error aggravated by bad weather
- Site: Near Matsu Beigan Airport, Beigan, Matsu Islands; 26°13′50″N 119°59′36″E

Aircraft
- Aircraft type: Dornier 228
- Operator: Formosa Airlines
- Registration: B-12256
- Flight origin: Taipei Sungshan Airport, Taipei
- Destination: Matsu Beigan Airport, Beigan, Matsu Islands
- Occupants: 16
- Passengers: 14
- Crew: 2
- Fatalities: 16
- Survivors: 0

Formosa Airlines Flight 7601 was an aviation accident that killed 16 people on 10 August 1997 in Beigan, Matsu Islands, Fujian, Republic of China.

== Accident ==
Formosa Airlines Flight 7601, a Dornier 228 took off from Taipei Sungshan Airport at 07:37 local time with 14 passengers and two pilots on board for a flight to Matsu Beigan Airport. Rain and high winds caused the plane to miss its first approach to Matsu Beigan Airport. During its go around, the pilot turned right instead of left. The aircraft crashed and caught fire after it struck a military water tower approximately one kilometer from the airport. All 16 passengers and crew on board were killed.

Shortly after the crash, a local weather official tried to commit suicide. The Director of the Civil Aeronautics Administration, Tsai Tui, said the suicide attempt stemmed from public outcry over the crash.
