= 2009 Handlová mine blast =

Coal mine accident in Trencin Region, Slovakia

Coordinates: 48.7272°N 18.7619°E

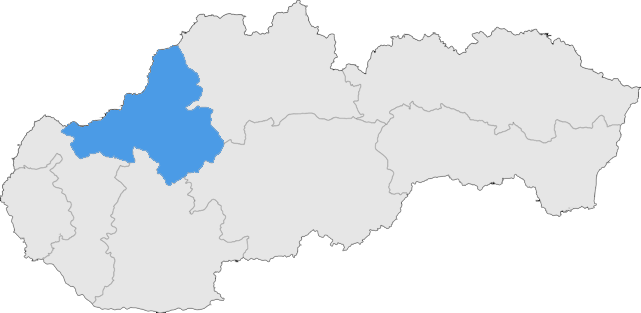
The blast occurred in Trenčín Region of Slovakia

The blast occurred in Handlová, Slovakia. Above, Slovakia (dark green) on the European continent (camel and white) and in the European Union (light green).

The 2009 Handlová mine blast occurred on 10 August 2009 roughly 330 metres (1,080 ft) underground in Trenčín Region, Slovakia at Hornonitrianske Bane Prievidza, a.s.s (HNB) coal mine located in the town of Handlová. Twenty people were killed, nine others suffered minor injuries and were taken to hospital for treatment. Some historians have called the disaster the largest mining tragedy in Slovakia's history. The deadly explosion, probably caused by flammable gases, occurred after mine rescuers had earlier been deployed to extinguish a fire in the Eastern shaft of the mine.

The incident is the deadliest mining disaster in Slovakia's history since the country's independence in 1993. Only 12 people had been killed while mining in Slovakia during the previous 12 years.

An official investigation into the disaster concluded in 2011, that several factors caused the explosion, but was unable to determine if any breaches of safety regulation had occurred. There employees with the mining company were eventually charged with negligence.

== Background ==
Hornonitrianske Bane (HNB) Prievidza, a.s coal mine in Handlová is known as a rich source of Slovakia's best-quality brown coal, however it also ranks among the most dangerous mines in the country because it is literally full of methane, a very explosive gas. The mine is equipped with sensors to monitor the concentration of methane in the air and whenever the concentration rises to an explosive level, the electrical installation in the whole mine is switched off and miners are signalled to leave.

Coal extracted from mines in the Upper Nitra region is also 10 times younger than the hard black coal in the Ostrava region, which means that it is considerably less stable and poses a higher risk of rock-slides. The latter is what happened in nearby Nováky where four miners died in 2006. Coal extraction at Handlová ceased in 1990 and the mine was closed down by a government decision was made for economic reasons rather than safety concerns. Coal mining was restarted in 2003, based on a decision of the Slovak government made in 1993. The state has been supporting mining as a source of jobs in this relatively poor region of the country.

Coal mining companies received subventions worth more than €3.2 million from the state budget in 2008 and the privately owned HNB company received almost €500,000 of that sum. The state also guarantees demand for coal extracted from Slovak mines. For instance, the former state energy company, Slovenské elektrárne is obliged to buy coal for its power plant in Nováky, the only one fired with brown coal, exclusively from domestic sources.

== The explosion ==
The incident happened in the old abandoned underground eastern shaft of the mine, belonging to Hornonitrianske Bane (HNB) Prievidza, a.s., the largest mining company in Slovakia, located at approximately 330 metres (1,080 ft). In the morning of August 10 at around 07:00, a fire broke out in the shaft, which had been out of production since 17 June. Initially, a fire-fighting team of nine miners was dispatched to extinguish the blaze. Shortly after, a second team consisting of an additional 11 miners was dispatched to reinforce the first team. At around 08:30 local time, flammable gases, which had accumulated secondarily due to the fire, ignited. The resulting explosion ripped through the mine and killed both fire-fighting teams instantly. The blast was so significant, that it reached air shafts located several hundred meters away, collapsing much of the tunnel-network of the mine. In addition to the 20 killed, another nine miners were injured.

== Rescue and recovery ==
Rescue efforts were launched immediately, with three rescue units entering the mine. During a press conference in the evening, Economy Minister Ľubomír Jahnátek and the director of the mining company, Peter Čičmanec announced that most likely none of the unaccounted employees had survived the explosion. Six bodies were found around 65 metres from the supposed epicentre of the explosion. Even 14 hours after the explosion the conditions in the area were incompatible with life, with high temperatures, a low concentration of oxygen and levels of carbon dioxide so high that it could not be measured. During the next 24 hours three more bodies were recovered. By August 12, rescuers had recovered the bodies of 16 of the 20 deceased. The next day, the last four bodies were recovered as rescuers braved temperatures of 50 degrees, and near-zero visibility.

Relatives have gathered to see the bodies of their loved ones be recovered.

== Reactions ==
The Slovakian Government met at an extraordinary session on 11 August 2009. Prime Minister Robert Fico declared an official day of mourning for the following day and gave orders for an investigation into the incident to take place, calling it "a huge tragedy". State flags were lowered at half mast during the mourning period. It was the fourth national day of mourning in Slovakia's history and the first since a killer bus crash in February 2009. Relatives of the victims will also be compensated by the government. Most people in the town of Handlová, which has a population of 18,000, know someone who works in the mine. A black flag hung in the town after the incident as the townspeople remembered the victims.

Ukrainian Prime Minister Yulia Tymoshenko sent a telegram of condolence: "I wish to share the pain of loss as Ukraine has experienced similar catastrophes not once. On behalf of the Government and from me personally I ask to retell the words of compassion and support to the families and relatives of the deceased miners".

The incident happened near Nováky where four miners were killed by a shaft collapse in 2006.
