= Handlová =

- Municipality
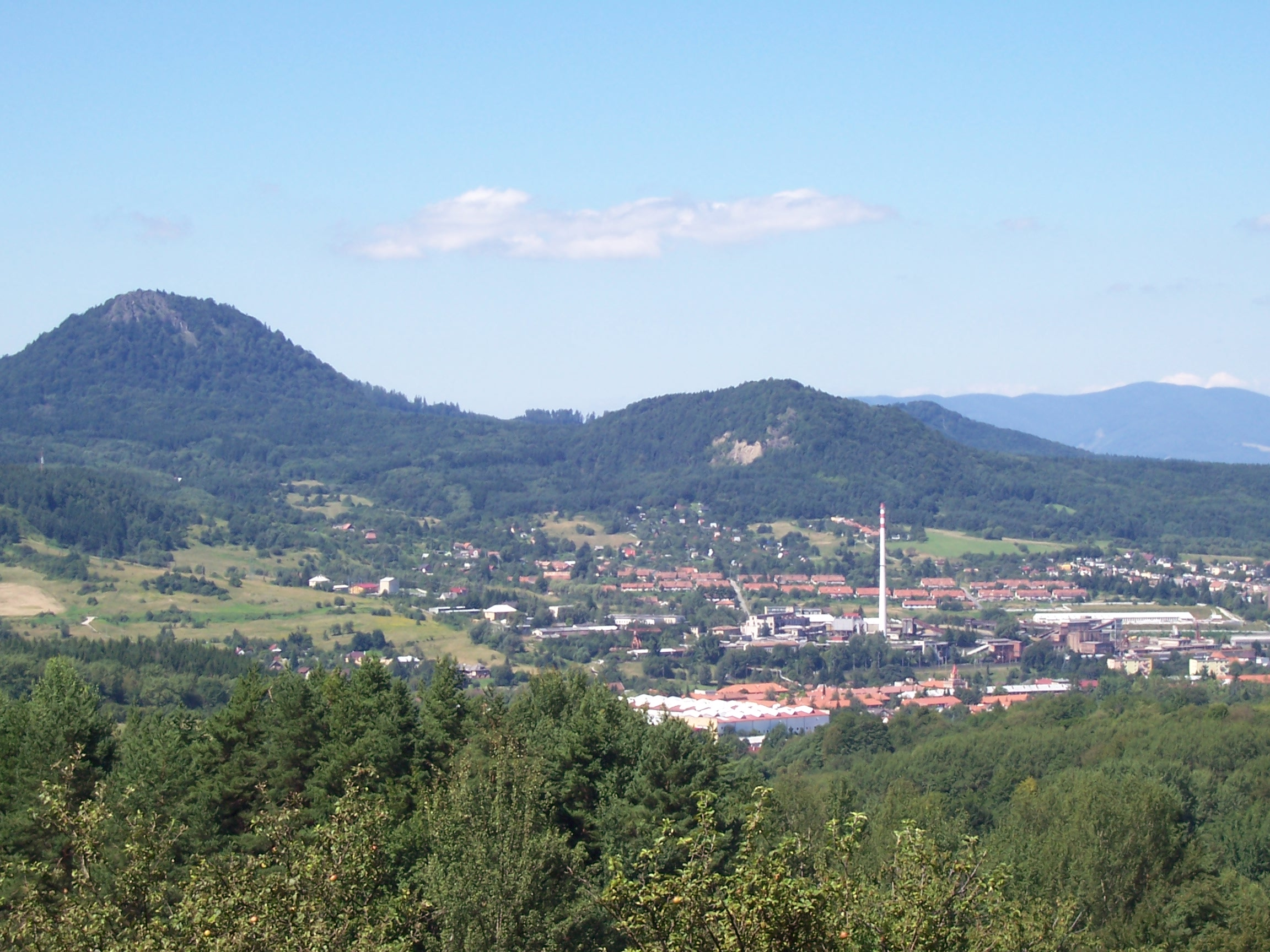

- Flag Coat of arms

- Location of Handlová in the Trenčín Region Location of Handlová in Slovakia
- Coordinates: 48.73°N 18.76°E
- Country: Slovakia
- Region: Trenčín Region
- District: Prievidza District
- First mentioned: 1367

Government
  - Mayor: Silvia Grúberová

Area
  - Total: 85.55 km^{2} (33.03 sq mi)
- Elevation: 465 m (1,526 ft)

Population (2025)
  - Total: 15,289
- Time zone: UTC+1 (CET)
  - Summer (DST): UTC+2 (CEST)
- Postal code: 972 51
- Area code: +421 46
- Vehicle registration plate (until 2022): PD
- Website: www.handlova.sk

Handlová (German: Krickerhau, Hungarian: Nyitrabánya, before 1913 Handlova) is a town in the Prievidza District, Trenčín Region in the middle of Slovakia. It is made up of the three parts Handlová, Nová Lehota and Morovno.

== Geography ==
The municipality lies at an altitude of 465 metres (1,526 ft) and covers an area of 85.55 km^{2} (33.03 sq mi) (2025).

It is located in the Handlovka brook valley, surrounded by the mountain ranges of Vtáčnik in the west and Žiar in the south, east and north, in the historical region of Hauerland. It is 15 kilometres (9 miles) away from Prievidza and 20 km (12 mi) from Žiar nad Hronom.

Besides the main settlement, it also has "parts" of Morovno (north-west) and Nová Lehota (south), both annexed 1976.

== History ==
The town was established in 1376 and was inhabited by German settlers which were later known as the Carpathian Germans. The first known settler in Handlová was Peter Kricker from Kremnica, who came here together with 200 others to establish a settlement on a site called Krásny les (Beautiful Forest). At first the settlers lived just from crops and pastoral farming. Only much later, in the 18th century, did coal mining begin. Local miners at first worked mainly to supply the needs of nearby Bojnice Castle.

In 1945, after World War II, Handlová underwent the biggest upheaval in its centuries-long history. Most of its ethnic German inhabitants were expelled from the town due to the so-called Beneš decrees. Of the original 12,800 people who lived there as late as in 1943, only 4,000 remained in Handlová by 1945. As a result, Handlová's character changed completely. It received town privileges in 1960.

In 2009, the town suffered a major disaster during the 2009 Handlová mine blast, in which 20 people were killed.

On 15 May 2024, Prime Minister of Slovakia Robert Fico was shot in front of the House of Culture after a government meeting, in an assassination attempt. He was subsequently rushed to Handlová Hospital, before later being airlifted to F.D. Roosevelt Hospital in Banská Bystrica, where he underwent successful surgery.

== Population ==
Historical population
| Year | Pop. | ±% |
|---|---|---|
| 1970 | 17,111 | — |
| 1980 | 17,777 | +3.9% |
| 1991 | 17,835 | +0.3% |
| 2001 | 18,018 | +1.0% |
| 2011 | 17,766 | −1.4% |
| 2021 | 16,199 | −8.8% |
Source: Censuses

Population statistic (10 years)
| Year | 1995 | 2005 | 2015 | 2025 |
|---|---|---|---|---|
| Count | 18,190 | 17,698 | 17,385 | 15,289 |
| Difference | | −2.70% | −1.76% | −12.05% |

Population statistic
| Year | 2024 | 2025 |
|---|---|---|
| Count | 15,457 | 15,289 |
| Difference | | −1.08% |

It has a population of 15,289 people (31 December 2025).

=== Ethnicity ===
Census 2021 (1+ %)
| Ethnicity | Number | Fraction |
|---|---|---|
| Slovak | 14,589 | 90.06% |
| Not found out | 1469 | 9.06% |
| Total | 16,199 | |

In year 2021 was 16,199 people by ethnicity 14,589 as Slovak, 1469 as Not found out, 96 as Czech, 87 as Romani, 76 as Hungarian, 46 as German, 28 as Other, 25 as Russian, 17 as Rusyn, 14 as Polish, 9 as Austrian, 8 as Romanian, 7 as Vietnamese, 5 as Ukrainian, 4 as Irish, 4 as Moravian, 3 as Chinese, 3 as English, 2 as Jewish, 2 as Greek, 2 as Croatian, 1 as Italian, 1 as Serbian, 1 as Silesian and 1 as French.

Note on population: The difference values of population numbers in the table "Population statistic" and in the sections "Ethnicity" & "Religion" is caused by the use of various statistical methods.

=== Religion ===
Census 2021 (1+ %)
| Religion | Number | Fraction |
|---|---|---|
| None | 9372 | 57.86% |
| Roman Catholic Church | 4019 | 24.81% |
| Not found out | 2096 | 12.94% |
| Evangelical Church | 226 | 1.4% |
| Total | 16,199 | |

In year 2021 was 16,199 people by religion 9372 from None, 4019 from Roman Catholic Church, 2096 from Not found out, 226 from Evangelical Church, 93 from Jehovah's Witnesses, 91 from Christian Congregations in Slovakia, 88 from Greek Catholic Church, 54 from Ad hoc movements, 30 from Other, 26 from Other and not ascertained christian church, 21 from Calvinist Church, 16 from Eastern Orthodox Church, 16 from Buddhism, 10 from United Methodist Church, 9 from Paganism and natural spirituality, 6 from Baptists Church, 5 from Old Catholic Church, 5 from Hinduism, 4 from Jewish community, 4 from Islam, 4 from Apostolic Church, 2 from Church of Jesus Christ of Latter-day Saints, 1 from Church of the Brethren and 1 from Seventh-day Adventist Church.

== People ==
- Jozef Lenč, political scientist, University of Ss. Cyril and Methodius in Trnava
- Peter Paliatka, designer, sculptor and university pedagogue
- Martin Škrtel, Slovak footballer

== Twin towns – sister cities ==
Handlová is twinned with:

- Konopiska, Poland
- Sárisáp, Hungary
- Voerde, Germany
- Zábřeh, Czech Republic

== See also ==
- List of municipalities and towns in Slovakia

== Genealogical resources ==
The records for genealogical research are available at the state archive "Statny Archiv in Nitra, Slovakia"

- Roman Catholic church records (births/marriages/deaths): 1642-1939 (parish A)
- Lutheran church records (births/marriages/deaths): 1735-1950 (parish B)
