= Endre Czeizel =

Hungarian physician, geneticist and professor (1935–2015)

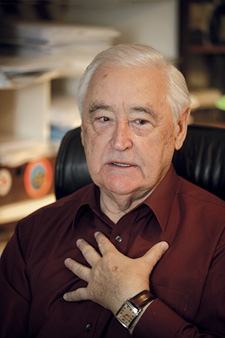
- Endre Czeizel in 2009
- Born: 3 April 1935; Budapest, Hungary
- Died: 10 August 2015 (aged 80); Budapest, Hungary
- Spouse(s): Judit Gerőfi; Erzsébet Mécs; Dóra
- Children: Gábor; Balázs; Barbara; Erzsébet; András; Fanni
- Scientific career
- Fields: Genetics; Gynaecology; Obstetrics; Teratology
- Workplaces: World Health Organization

Endre Czeizel (3 April 1935 – 10 August 2015) was a Hungarian physician, geneticist, public health administrator, and professor. He was a physician who graduated from Semmelweis University. He was known for discovering that vitamin B9 or folic acid prevents or reduces the formation of more serious developmental disorders, such as neural tube defects like spina bifida. He issued some of his English-language publications under the name Andrew E. Czeizel. He was the Hungarian Director of United Nations World Health Organization (1984-?). From 1996 thru 1998 he was the Director-General of the Hungarian National Institutes of Health. He died from leukemia following a successful bone marrow transplant after approximately one year.

== Personal life ==
In 1958, he married Judit Gerőfi, by whom he fathered two sons, Gábor and Balázs, and a daughter, Barbara. After 12 years of marriage Judit died; he later remarried to Erzsébet Mécs, whose daughter Andrea he raised. By his mistress Dóra, he fathered two illegitimate children, András and Fanni. Czeizel's son-in law is Gábor Fodor, the leader of the Hungarian Liberal Party.

== Awards ==
- Markusovszky Award (1970, 1973)
- SZOT Prize (1977)
- The Hungarian Republic, Officer's Cross of the Order of Merit (1995)
- Kennedy Award (2000)
- The Hungarian Cross of the Order of Merit (2005)
