= Eriek Verpale =

Belgian writer

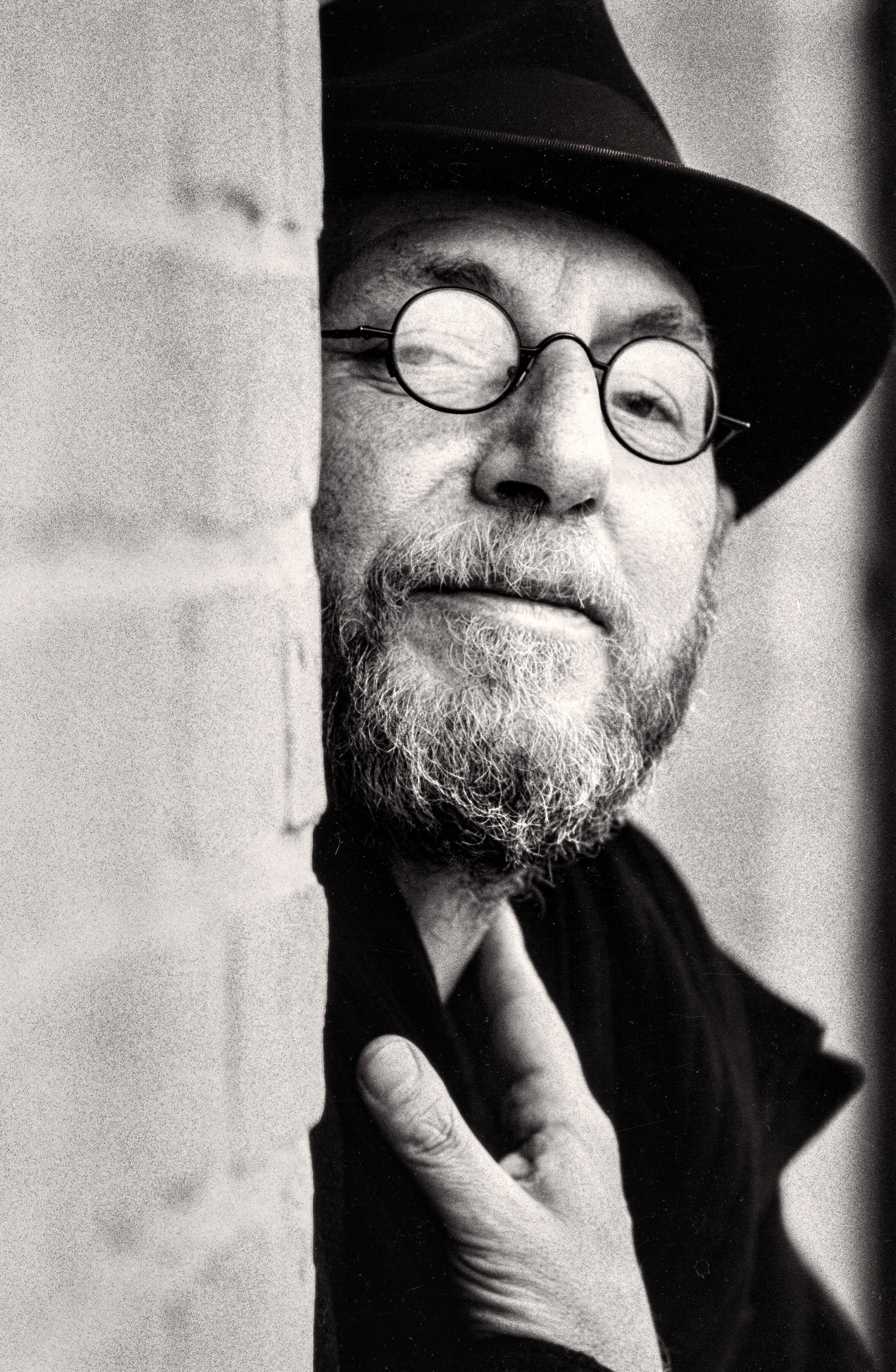
Eriek Verpale (photo Michiel Hendryckx)

Eric Verpaele (Zelzate, 2 February 1952 – Ertvelde, 10 August 2015), pseudonym: Eriek Verpale) was a Belgian writer. He attended a boarding school in Oostakker and studied Germanic and Slavic philology at the University of Ghent. He was an editor of the magazine Koebel, several literary magazines and the Belgisch-Israëlitisch Weekblad (transl. Belgian-Israeli Weekly).

He made his literary debut as a poet with neoromantic poems in Polder- en andere gedichten (1975). His maternal great-grandmother was of jiddisch Polish-Jewish ancestry, and the chasidic and Eastern European literature play an important role in his work.

== Bibliography ==
- De rabbi en andere verhalen (1975)
- Polder- en andere gedichten (1975)
- Voor een simpel ogenblik maar ... (1976)
- Een meisje uit Odessa (1979)
- Op de trappen van Algiers (1980)
- Alles in het klein (1990)
- Onder vier ogen (1992)
- Olivetti 82 (1993)
- Nachten van Beiroet (1994)
- De patatten zijn geschild (1995)
- Grasland (1996)
- Gitta (1997)
- Katse nachten (2000)

== See also ==
- Flemish literature
- Bernard, a feature film made of the monologue "Olivetti" 82 can be freely watched online.

== Sources ==
- Eriek Verpale
- Eriek Verpale
