= Death of Evil =

- Directed by: Damian Chapa
- Written by: Damian Chapa
- Starring: Damian Chapa; Natasha Blasick; Steve Nave; Monique Yates
- Distributed by: Amadeus Pictures
- Release date: September 30, 2009
- Running time: 92 minutes
- Country: United States
- Language: English
- Budget: $1 million

Death of Evil is a 2009 direct-to-video supernatural horror film, written, directed by and starring Damian Chapa. The film revolves around a Native American man who must fight off an evil plot by his pregnant wife's family line to corrupt his unborn child. It was released in the United States in September 2009, and in the Netherlands in October 2010.

== Plot ==
David and Julie are expecting their first child, but David discovers that her family is a long line of devil worshippers. They plan to offer up the baby as a sacrifice to Satan to prolong their power and lifespans, and David must use the psychic and spiritual powers within himself to save them all.

== Cast ==
- Damian Chapa as David
- Natasha Blasick as Julieta (as Natash Blasick)
- Steve Nave as Thosen
- Jeff McCredie as Kenny
- Monique Yates as Mother
- Carlton Holder as Sage
- Julia Melim as Sister
- Stanley Griego as Indian
- Silke Kindle as Lacy
- Catalina Catani as Kim
- Paula LaBaredas as Angie
- Stephanie Voy as Stacey
