= Beigan Airport =

Airport on Beigan Island, Fukien Province, Taiwan

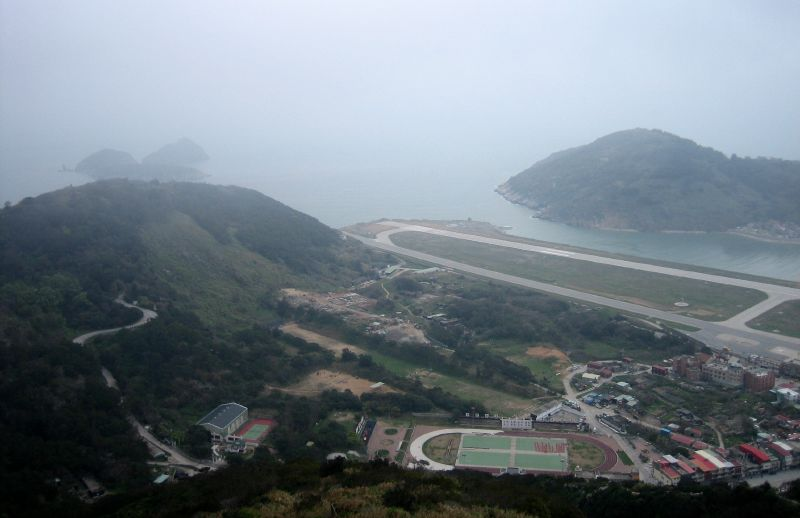
- IATA: MFK; ICAO: RCMT

Summary
- Airport type: Public
- Operator: Civil Aeronautics Administration
- Location: Beigan, Matsu Islands, Taiwan
- Opened: 17 January 1994; 32 years ago
- Elevation AMSL: 12 m (39 ft)
- Coordinates: 26°13′26″N 120°00′09″E

Map
- Location of airport in Taiwan

Runways
Direction	Length		Surface
Direction	m	ft	Surface
03/21	1,150	3,773	Concrete

Matsu Beigan Airport (traditional Chinese: 馬祖北竿機場; simplified Chinese: 马祖北竿机场; pinyin: Mǎzǔ Běigān Jīchǎng) (IATA: MFK, ICAO: RCMT) is one of the airports in Matsu Islands, Lienchiang County, Fukien Province, Taiwan. It also serves as a heliport and located on Beigan Island. It is served by Uni Air ATR 72-600 (立榮航空) with scheduled flights to Taipei Songshan Airport.

== History ==
The airport was built in 1994 on the Beigan Island of the Beigan Township. When opened, it was the only airport in the Matsu Islands, and was only served by small aircraft due to its short runway and terrain to the west. The airport was expanded in 2000, adding a 1,150-metre (3,770 ft) runway to the east of the original runway.

After the opening of the larger Nangan Airport in 2003, passenger traffic at Beigan Airport decreased. A new terminal building opened in 2005.

There are plans in place to extend the runway at Beigan Airport to 1,500 metres (4,900 ft) long, replacing the current Nangan Airport, scheduled to be completed in 2032.

== Facilities ==
The airport has one runway, designated 03/21 with a concrete surface measuring 1,150 by 30 meters (3,773 by 98 feet). The apron has 2 aircraft stands that are capable of accommodating aircraft such as the ATR 72-600.

== Airlines and destinations ==
Uni Air connects Beigan Airport to Taipei Songshan Airport.

== Accidents and incidents ==
- On 10 August 1997, Formosa Airlines Flight 7601 crashed while attempting to land at Matsu Beigan Airport. All 16 passengers and crew perished in the accident.

== See also ==
- Civil Aeronautics Administration (Taiwan)
- Transportation in Taiwan
- List of airports in Taiwan
