= Hualien Airport =

Commercial airport in Xincheng, Hualien County, Taiwan

Hualien Airport 花蓮航空站
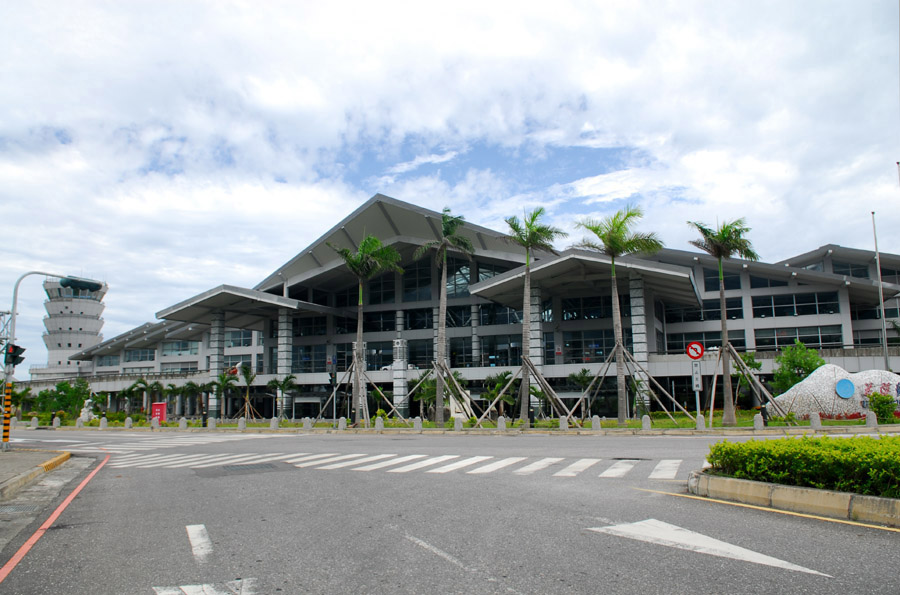
- IATA: HUN; ICAO: RCYU

Summary
- Airport type: Public
- Operator: Civil Aeronautics Administration
- Location: Xincheng Township, Hualien County, Taiwan
- Elevation AMSL: 16 m (52 ft)
- Coordinates: 24°01′23″N 121°37′04″E

Map
- Location of airport in Hualien County Location of airport in Taiwan

Runways
Direction	Length		Surface
Direction	m	ft	Surface
03/21	2,750	9,022	Concrete

Hualien Airport (Chinese: 花蓮機場; pinyin: Huālián Jīchǎng; Amis: Pahikukiyan nu Kalinku; Seediq: Rduwan Msangay Asu Skiya Skangki) (IATA: HUN, ICAO: RCYU), also referred to as Hualien Chiashan Airport, is a commercial airport located in an 11.5-hectare (28-acre) civilian area of Chiashan Air Force Base in Xincheng, Hualien County, Taiwan. With flights to Taipei, Kaohsiung and Taichung, it served 235,386 passengers in 2017, making it the tenth-busiest airport in Taiwan.

== History ==
The airport was opened on 16 May 1962, for military and domestic civilian use. Before this, Hualien was a military gravel airfield.

On 27 April 2001, Hualien Airport became certified to serve international flights, specifically charter flights to and from Japan (to nearby Yonaguni in particular). The first Japanese charter arrived at Hualien on 1 October 2001. Charter flights to South Korea and Macau began in August and October 2004 respectively. However, these routes have since ended. There was also discussion of using Hualien for charter flights to mainland China under the Three Links scheme.

The proximity of Hualien Airport to a military base has caused some tension between travellers, airline officials, and the Republic of China Air Force, especially when civilian flights are cancelled due to war games exercises.

== Expansion ==
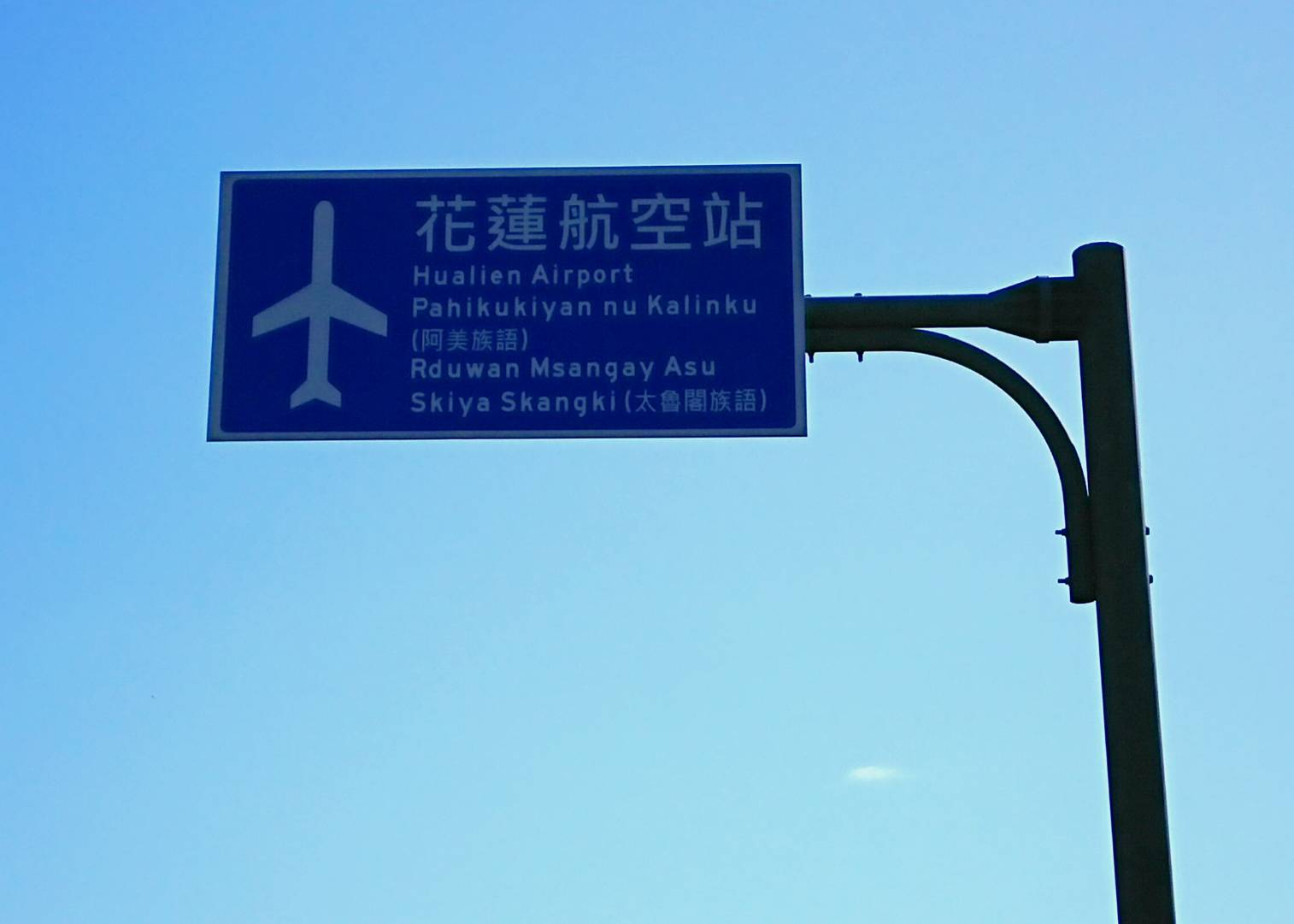
Multilingual sign in Hualien Airport (Chinese, English, Amis, Truku)

Because Hualien City is a popular gateway into Taroko National Park, the airport became too small and outdated for the growing number of tourists. As a result, it underwent a significant expansion between 2002 and 2005 in anticipation of increased traffic from international charters and in an effort to spur local economic development. Plans called for new passenger and cargo terminals, new air bridges, and a new apron.

The new passenger terminal was opened on 19 March 2004, at a cost of NT$2.3 billion (US$69 million). It incorporates design cues from both classical Chinese and Aboriginal Taiwanese architecture, though the building overall has a modern look with copious use of granite, marble, steel, and glass. Hualien's terminal is one of only three airport terminals in Taiwan whose layout allows aviation enthusiasts clear views of takeoffs and landings (the other two being Taoyuan International Airport and Kaohsiung International Airport.

== Airlines and destinations ==
Airlines	Destinations
Mandarin Airlines	Kaohsiung, Taichung
Uni Air	Taipei–Songshan

== Accidents and incidents ==
- On 26 October 1989, China Airlines Flight 204 crashed into a mountain shortly after takeoff from Hualien Airport. All 54 passengers and crew on board died.
- On 24 August 1999, Uni Air Flight 873 flight from Taipei carrying 96 passengers and crew exploded just after it landed at Hualien. The blast injured 27 people and killed one, although a pregnant woman miscarried days later. An investigation revealed that former Taiwanese decathlete Ku Chin-shui, who was not aboard the flight, had given two bleach bottles containing gasoline to his nephew to transport, which exploded when exposed wires attached to a motorcycle battery in the same overhead bin as the gasoline sparked after being jostled during the landing. Ku was convicted in 2002 and sentenced to seven and a half years in prison, but a later trial upon his appeal found him not guilty on 27 December 2004.

== Transportation ==
The airport is accessible within walking distance south-east of Beipu railway station. Local bus 1123 operates a loop between the airport, Hualien station and Hualien City.

== See also ==
- Civil Aeronautics Administration (Taiwan)
- Transportation in Taiwan
- List of airports in Taiwan
