= McDonnell Douglas MD-80/MD-90 =

McDonnell Douglas MD-80/MD90 may refer to:

- McDonnell Douglas MD-80
- McDonnell Douglas MD-90
