= Chiayi Airport =

Airport in Shuishang, Chiayi County, Taiwan

Chiayi Airport (Shueishang Airport)
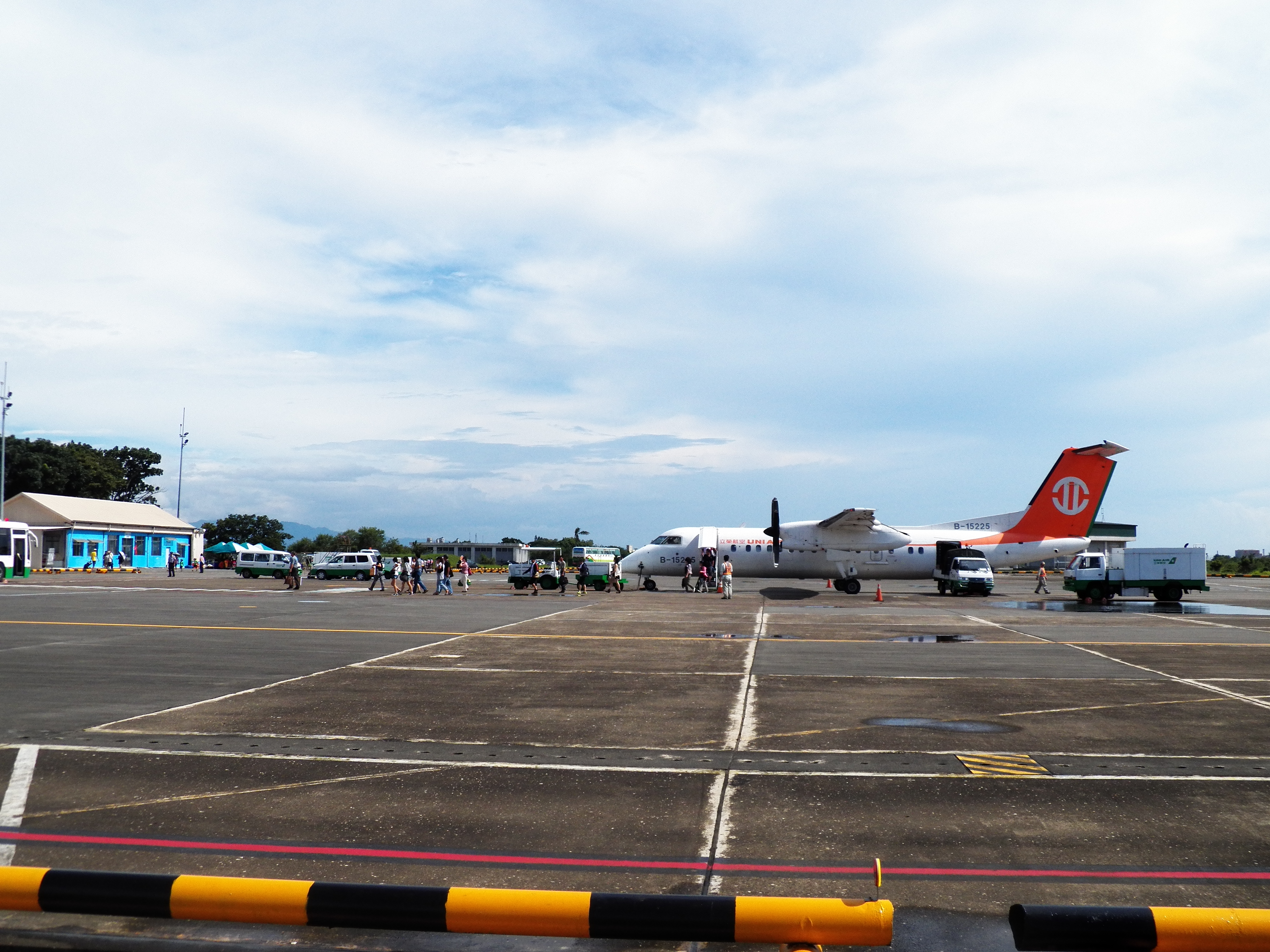
- IATA: CYI; ICAO: RCKU

Summary
- Airport type: Public/Military
- Operator: Civil Aeronautics Administration; Ministry of National Defense
- Location: Shuishang Township, Chiayi County, Taiwan
- Elevation AMSL: 26 m / 85 ft
- Coordinates: 23°27′47″N 120°23′26″E
- Website: Chiayi Airport

Map
- Location of airport in Chiayi County Location of airport in Taiwan

Runways
Direction	Length		Surface
Direction	m	ft	Surface
~~18L/36R~~; Closed	~~1,618~~	~~5,308~~	~~Concrete~~
18/36	3,050	10,007	Asphalt

Chiayi Airport (Chinese: 嘉義航空站; pinyin: Jiāyì Hángkōngzhàn) (IATA: CYI, ICAO: RCKU), commonly known as Shueishang Airport (Chinese: 水上機場; pinyin: Shuǐshàng Jīchǎng), is an airport in Shuishang Township, Chiayi County, Taiwan. The airport has one runway, and it is used as a civilian airport and is co-located next to Chiayi Air Base. Chiayi Airport is envisioned as a gateway to the Alishan National Scenic Area, a popular tourist destination in Taiwan.

Opened in 1976, Chiayi Airport was one of the airports in Taiwan that were severely affected by the opening of the Taiwan High Speed Rail in 2007. Uni Air is the sole operator of scheduled flights to the airport. Although listed as an international airport by the Taiwanese government, the joint use of Chiayi Airport's facilities by the Republic of China Air Force and the lack of complete customs and immigration facilities at the airport restricts the use of the airport by international flights. As such, the airport has no scheduled international flights; it is only served internationally by occasional chartered flights.

== History ==
A departure lounge was completed on the grounds of Chiayi Air Base on 19 May 1976, marking the start of operations at Chiayi Airport. China Airlines launched the inaugural flight, providing regular flights between Taipei and Chiayi. Due to the growth in passenger numbers at the airport, a terminal building was built in 1977 and opened on 1 January 1978.

In 1990, Great China Air took over China Airlines' route at Chiayi Airport. At the same time, it also launched flights to Kinmen Airport and Penghu Airport. TransAsia Airways, Far Eastern Air Transport and Formosa Airlines all launched flights at Chiayi Airport between 1994 and 1996. Meanwhile, Chiayi Airport's terminal was expanded and refurbished in 1995 to handle the increased number of passengers using the airport. In 1995, the airport served over a million passengers for the first time. The airport was reclassified as a B-class airport in 1996.

However, in 1999, the number of services to Chiayi Airport decreased when Formosa Airlines withdrew from its operations at Chiayi Airport in the aftermath of an air crash over Hsinchu. This was followed by the successive withdrawals of Far Eastern Air Transport and TransAsia Airways in 2001 and 2002 respectively due to poor load factors caused by a slowing local economy. These withdraws left Uni Air, the successor of Great China Air, as the only operator of flights at Chiayi Airport.

With the launch of the Taiwan High Speed Rail in 2007, which links Chiayi to Taipei, demand for flights between Taipei and Chiayi declined significantly. This forced Uni Air to cancel its twice-daily flights between Taipei and Chiayi in August 2015.

The Taiwanese Government gave Chiayi Airport an "International Airport" status in December 2012 in a bid to boost local tourism. Chiayi Airport was subsequently added to the list of airports where direct cross-straits flights between China and Taiwan are allowed in 2013. A series of charter flights between Chiayi and Shizuoka Airport was launched by China Airlines that year, making them the first international flight from Chiayi Airport. This was followed by the launch of the first direct flight between Chiayi and a Mainland Chinese airport, a charter flight by Spring Airlines to Shanghai Pudong International Airport, in May 2014.

== Facilities ==
Chiayi Airport has an elevation of 85 feet (26 metres). It had two parallel runways, designated 18R/36L (now 18/36) and 18L/36R (currently closed and converted to taxiway). 18/36 measures 3,050 by 45 metres (10,007 by 148 ft) and is made of asphalt, while the shorter 18L/36R concrete runway (closed and now use for taxiing) measured 1,618 by 23 metres (5,308 by 75 ft). Only runway 18/36 is equipped with an instrument landing system. The runways and taxiways facilities at Chiayi Airport are shared with Chiayi Air Base.

Chiayi Airport has 3 aircraft stands that are capable of accommodating aircraft types such as the McDonnell Douglas MD-90 and ATR 72. Its 1,717-square metre terminal has a capacity of 222,000 a year, while its 45-square metre cargo facility is able to handle 19,035 tonnes of cargo annually. The airport has limited customs and immigration facilities that allows the airport to handle international flights.

== Airlines and destinations ==
Airlines	Destinations
Uni Air	Kinmen, Penghu

== See also ==
- Civil Aeronautics Administration (Taiwan)
- Transportation in Taiwan
- List of airports in Taiwan
