= X-66 =

X-66 may refer to:

- Kh-23 Grom, a family of early Soviet air-to-surface missiles including Kh-66
- Boeing X-66, an American experimental airliner
