= Great China Airlines =

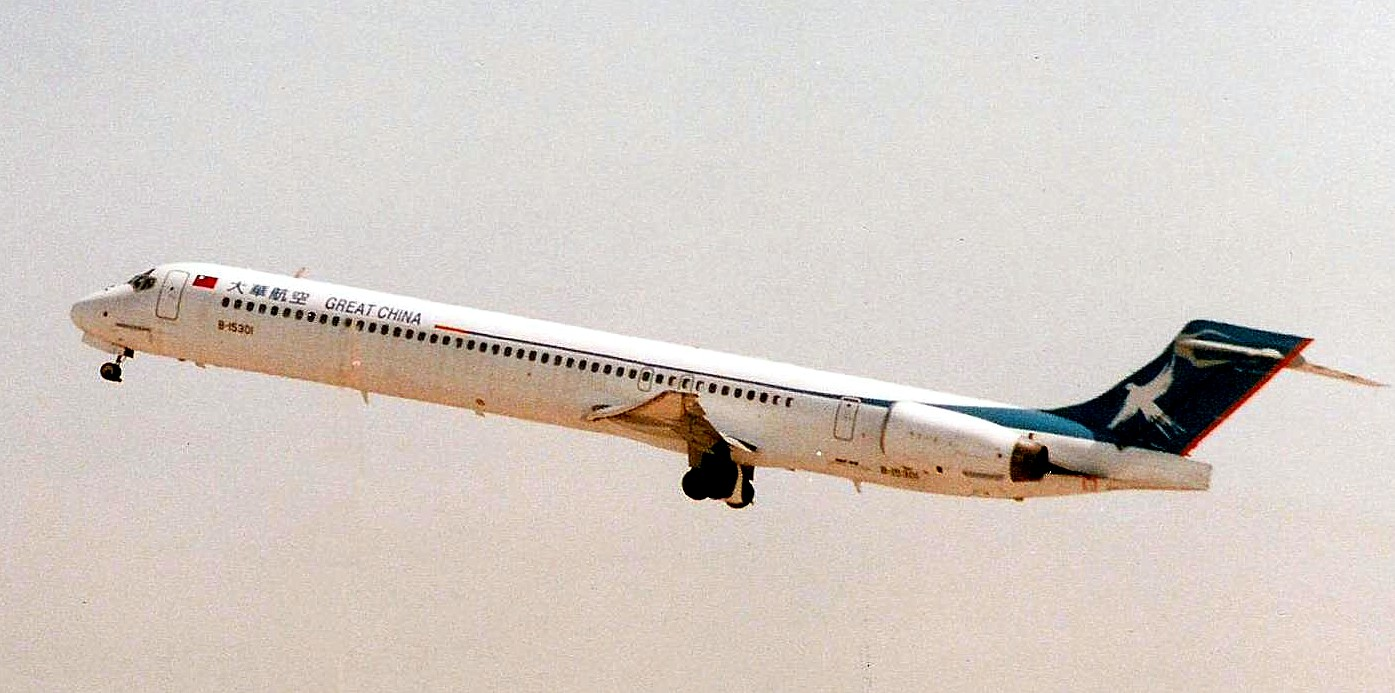
IATA	ICAO	Call sign
GC	GCA	?
- Founded: 28 March 1966
- Ceased operations: 1 July 1998
- Hubs: Songshan Airport
- Fleet size: 13
- Destinations: 10
- Headquarters: Taipei City, Taiwan

Great China Airlines (Chinese: 大華航空) was a Taiwan-based airline between 1966 and 1998.

== History ==
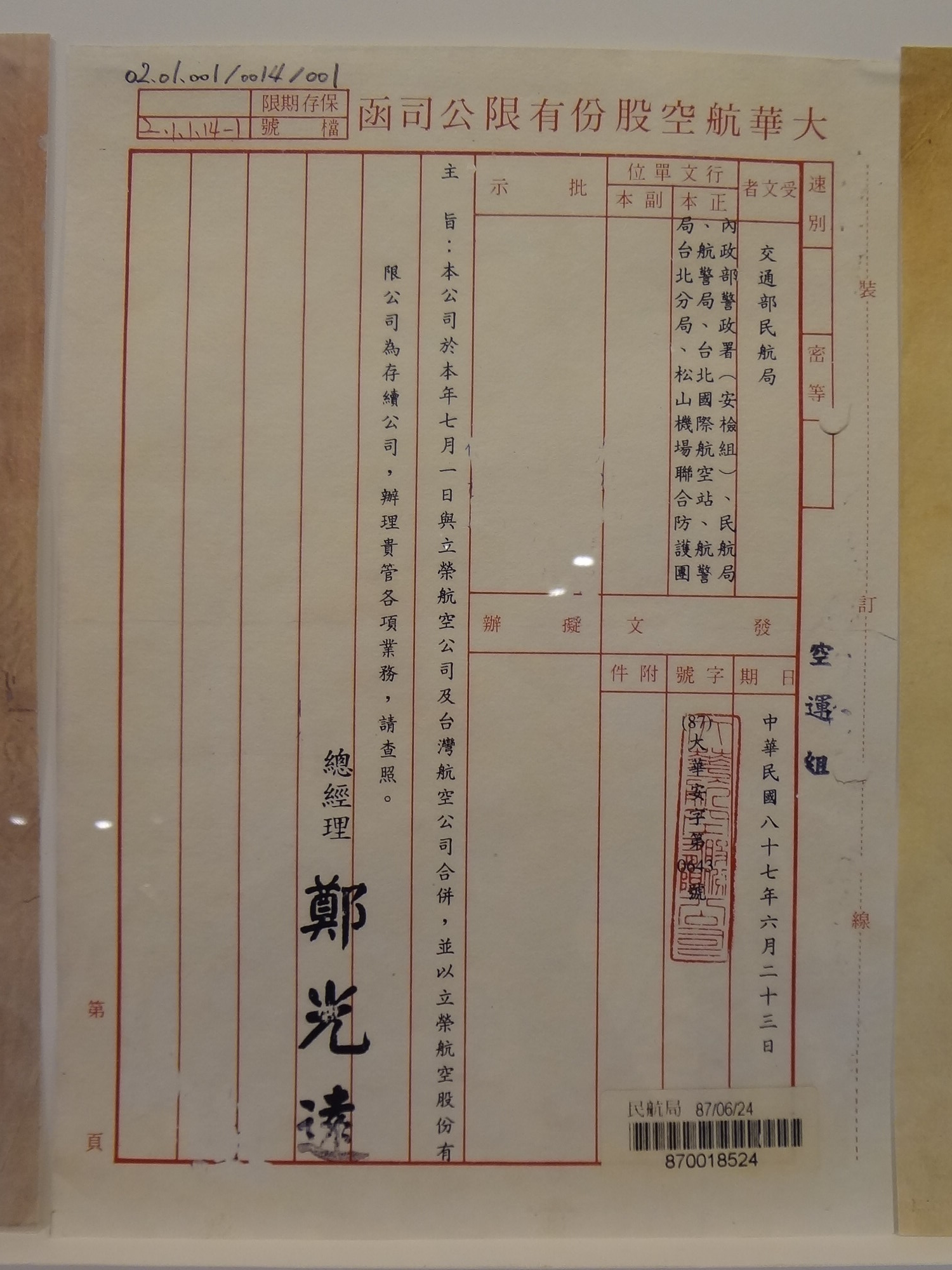
A memo by Great China Airlines confirming the merge into Uni Air

The airline was founded by entrepreneur Chao Liang-kung (趙諒公) and former air force general Wang Wei-min (王衛民) in 1966. The early operation of the airline focused on general aviation businesses such as operating charter flights, transporting supplies, and spraying pesticides by helicopter. The airline also conducted sightseeing helicopter tours, and supported China Television's news filming in 1980s. It later suspended operation and changed ownership. After Taiwan opened skies in 1987, Greater China Airlines applied for resuming businesses and operating civil aviation services.

In April 1994, EVA Air acquired 24% of Great China Airlines shares. Under the government's resources sharing directive, Great China Airlines and two other minor airlines (Taiwan Airways and Makung Airlines) were merged into Uni Air. Prior to the closure, Great China Airlines operated domestic services to and from Taipei, Taichung, Chiayi, Tainan, Kaohsiung, Kinmen, and Makung.

== Fleet ==
Great China Airlines had a total of 13 airliners in the fleet including 12 DHC-8-311 and a MD-90-30-IGW.

== Accidents and incidents ==
On 23 March 1998, a passenger on Great China Airlines flight 9565, bound for Chiayi from Taipei, attempted to hijack the plane and set fire before he was subdued. No fatalities were reported.
