= Chiayi Air Base =

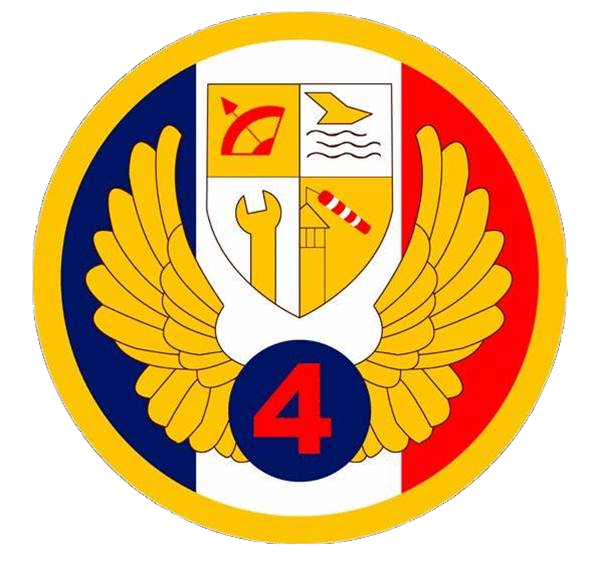
Chiayi Air Base 嘉義空軍基地

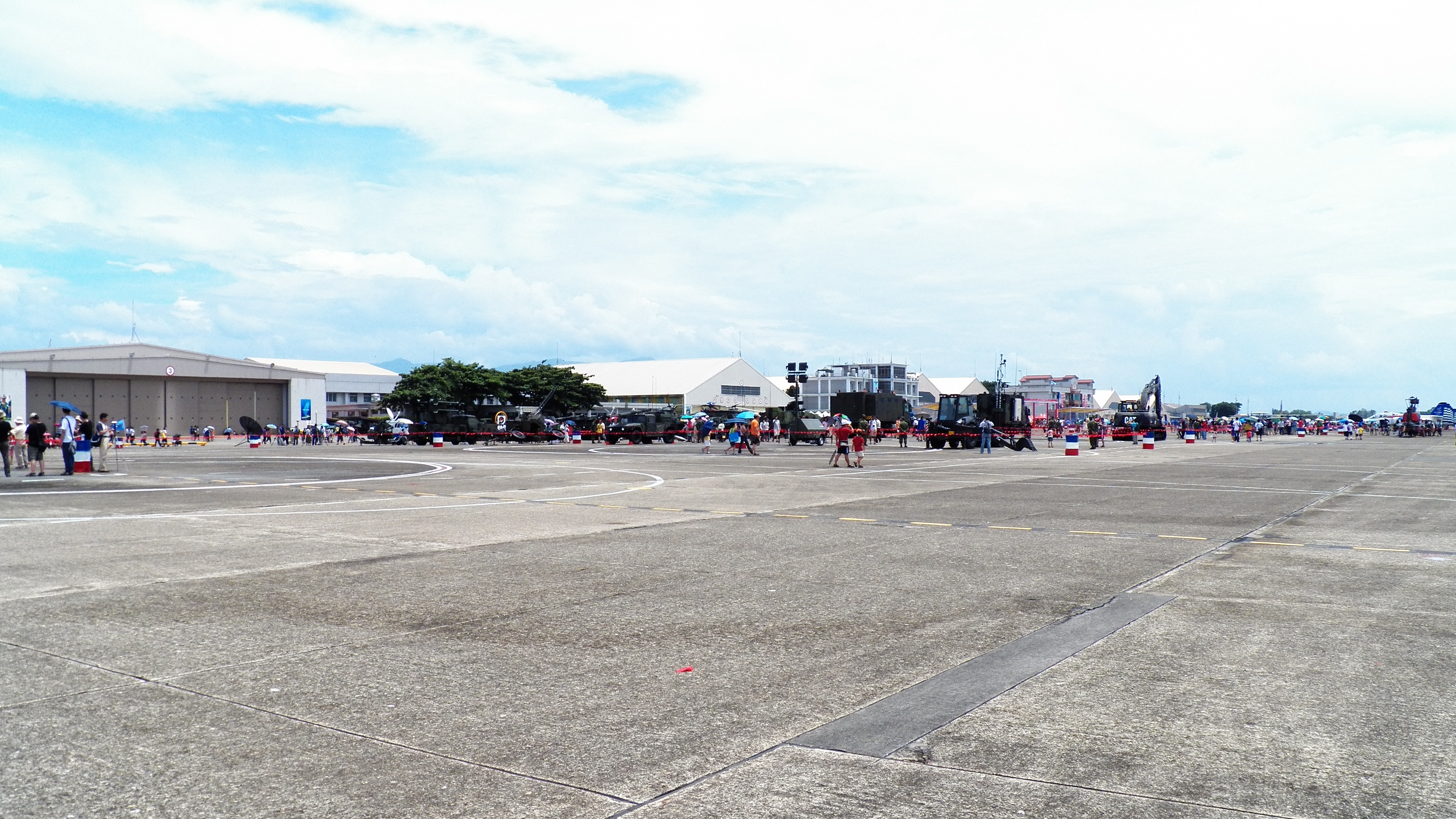
- IATA: CYI; ICAO: RCKU

Summary
- Airport type: Military
- Operator: ROC Air Force; United States Air Force(27 January 1955-7 January 1976)
- Location: Chiayi County, Taiwan
- Elevation AMSL: 25 m / 82 ft
- Coordinates: 23°27′42″N 120°23′34″E
- Website: Chiayi Airport

Map

Runways
Direction	Length		Surface
Direction	m	ft	Surface
18R/36L	3,050	10,006	Concrete
18L/36R	1,618	5,308	Asphalt

Chiayi Air Base (Chinese: 嘉義空軍基地) is an air base of the Republic of China Air Force that is co-located with Chiayi Airport in Chiayi County, Taiwan. A number of US Air Force units have been stationed at Chiayi Air Base, including the 67th Fighter-Bomber Squadron from 27 January – 17 February 1955 and 1 July – 1 October 1955. 19 February – 1 March 1958, Reconnaissance Task Force KENTUCKY, Kentucky Air National Guard deployed to Taoyuan and Chiayi Air Bases. 4 March 1955, 310th Fighter-Bomber Squadron deployed from Osan Air Base, South Korea, to Chiayi Air Force Base for air defense missions.

Between January 1955 and July 1968, the 51st Fighter-Interceptor Wing and 18th Tactical Fighter Wing was temporary task assignments (TDY) from Naha Air Base and Kadena Air Base in Okinawa, fighter jets are frequently rotated to Chiayi Air Base every 60–90 days.

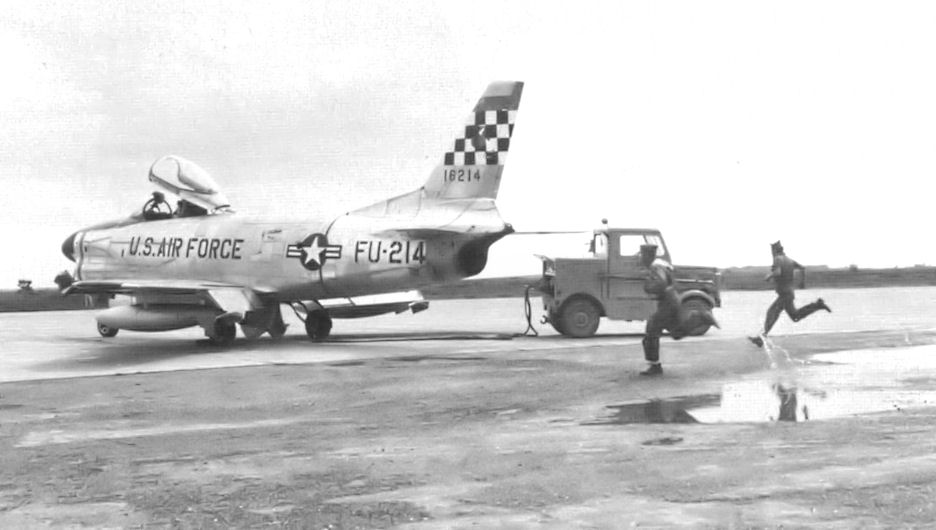
16th Fighter-Interceptor Squadron North American F-86D-35-NA Sabre 51–6214, assigned to Naha Air Base, Okinawa, deployed at Chia-Yi AFB, Taiwan, 1955

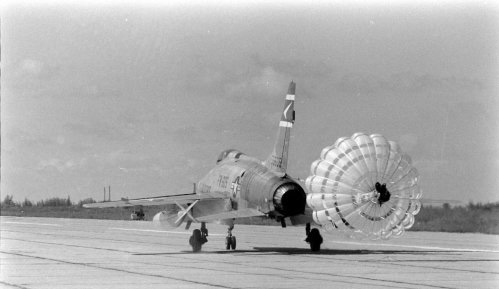
72nd Tactical Fighter Squadron North American F-100D-25-NA Super Sabre 55-3605 landed at Chiayi AFB, 1958

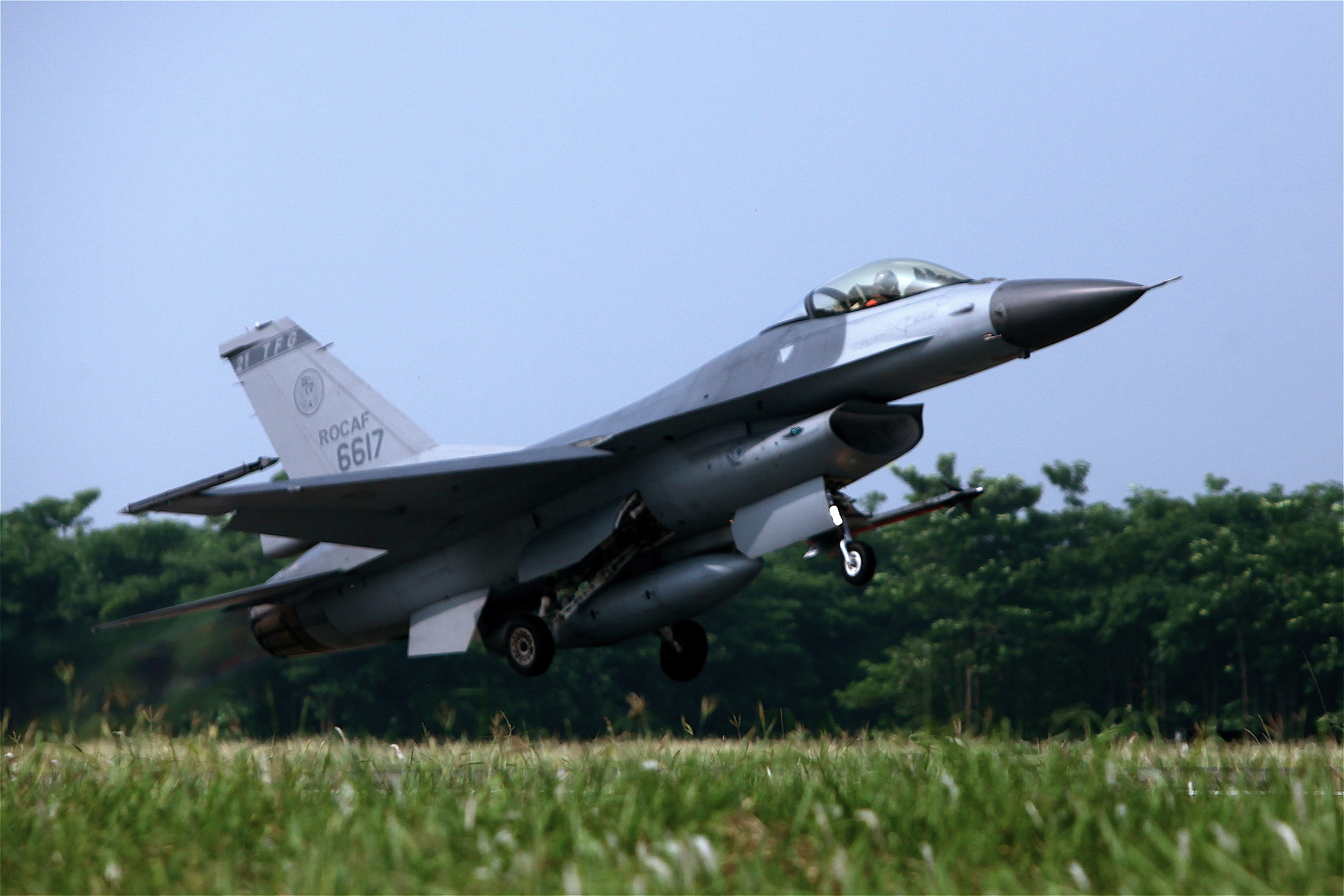
A US supplied F-16A fighter takes off from Chiayi Airbase in Southern Taiwan. These jets patrol the boundary in the strait across from China, 2011

== Based units ==
Republic of China Air Force

- 4th Tactical Fighter Wing
  - 21st Tactical Fighter Group – F-16V
  - 22nd Tactical Fighter Group – F-16A/B Fighting Falcon
  - 23rd Tactical Fighter Group – F-16A/B Fighting Falcon
  - Air Rescue Group – Sikorsky S-70C, UH-60M, EC225 Super Puma
  - 4th Maintenance and Supply Group
  - 4th Base Service Group
  - 4th Military police Squadron
