= Uni Air Flight 873 =

1999 aviation accident in Taiwan

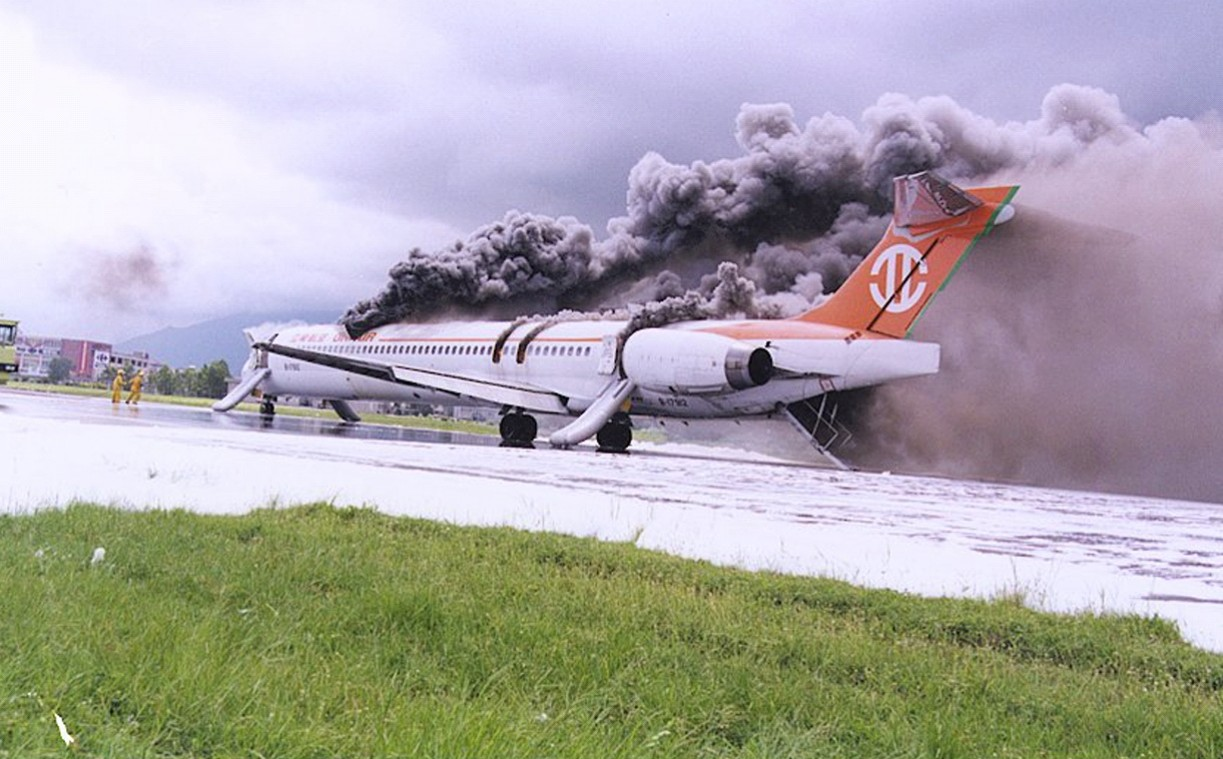
- The aircraft burning on the runway

Accident
- Date: 24 August 1999
- Summary: Explosion and fire caused by combustible materials
- Site: Hualien Airport, Taiwan

Aircraft
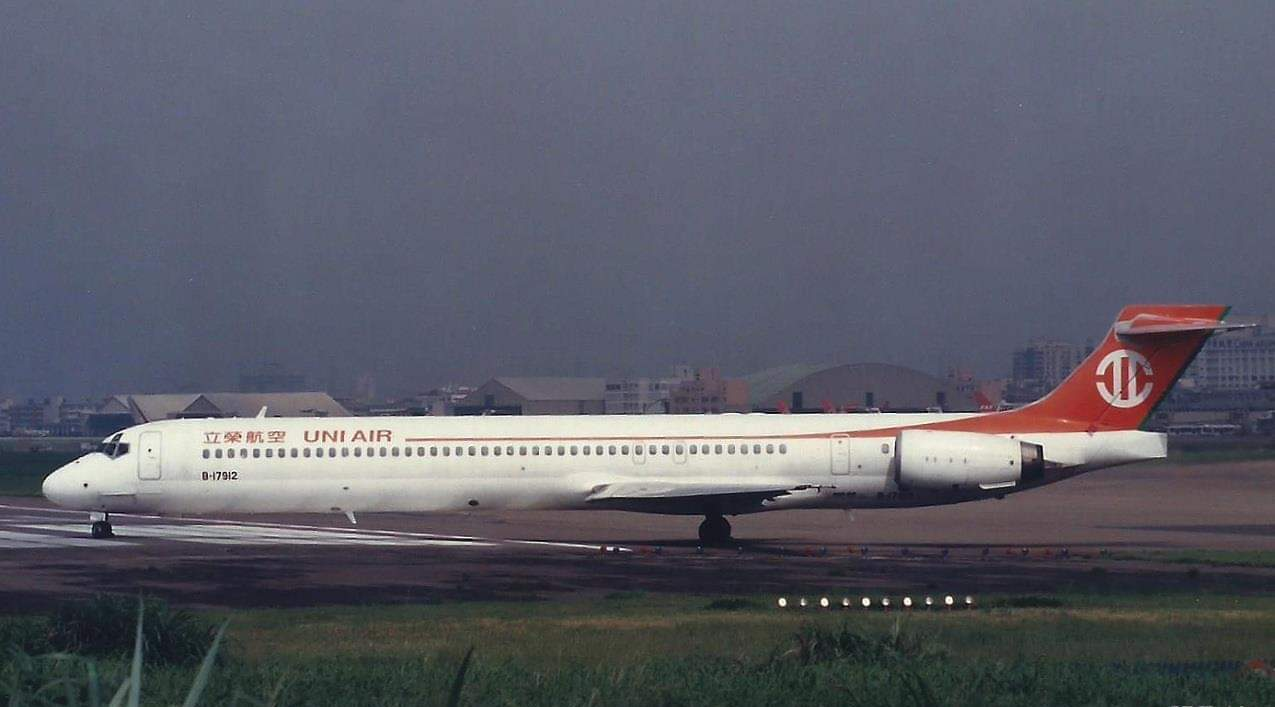
- B-17912, the aircraft involved in the accident, seen in 1998
- Aircraft type: McDonnell Douglas MD-90
- Operator: Uni Air
- IATA flight No.: B7873
- ICAO flight No.: UIA873
- Call sign: GLORY 873
- Registration: B-17912
- Flight origin: Taipei Songshan Airport, Taiwan
- Destination: Hualien Airport, Taiwan
- Occupants: 96
- Passengers: 90
- Crew: 6
- Fatalities: 1
- Injuries: 27
- Survivors: 95

Uni Air Flight 873 was a Taiwanese domestic passenger flight between Taipei and Hualien that suffered a fire following an explosion after landing at Hualien Airport, Taiwan, on 24 August 1999, resulting in 27 injuries and one death. This is the first and only fatal accident involving a McDonnell Douglas MD-90.

== Aircraft and crew ==
The aircraft involved was a McDonnell Douglas MD-90-30 registered as B-17912 with serial number 53536. It was manufactured by McDonnell Douglas in 1996 and had logged 4,929 airframe hours in 7,736 takeoff and landing cycles. It was powered by two IAE V2525-D5 engines.

The captain, age 41, had previously served in the military, and logged 6,532 flight hours, including 1,205 hours on the MD-90. The first officer, age 35, had 5,167 flight hours, but only 96 of them were on the MD-90. There were four flight attendants on board, all of whom had completed their most recent annual on-duty training in 1998.

== Accident ==
Uni Air Flight 873 departed from Taipei Songshan Airport (TSA) bound for Hualien Airport (HUN). It was carrying 90 passengers and six crew. Shortly after landing, at 12:36 local time, an explosion was heard in the front section of the passenger cabin, followed by smoke and then fire. A passenger was struck by fragments produced by the explosion. The pilot braked immediately, and an emergency passenger evacuation was initiated. After a Mayday call from the pilot, fire squads at Hualien Airport and the Air Force Wing rushed to extinguish the fire, which was put out by 13:45 WST.

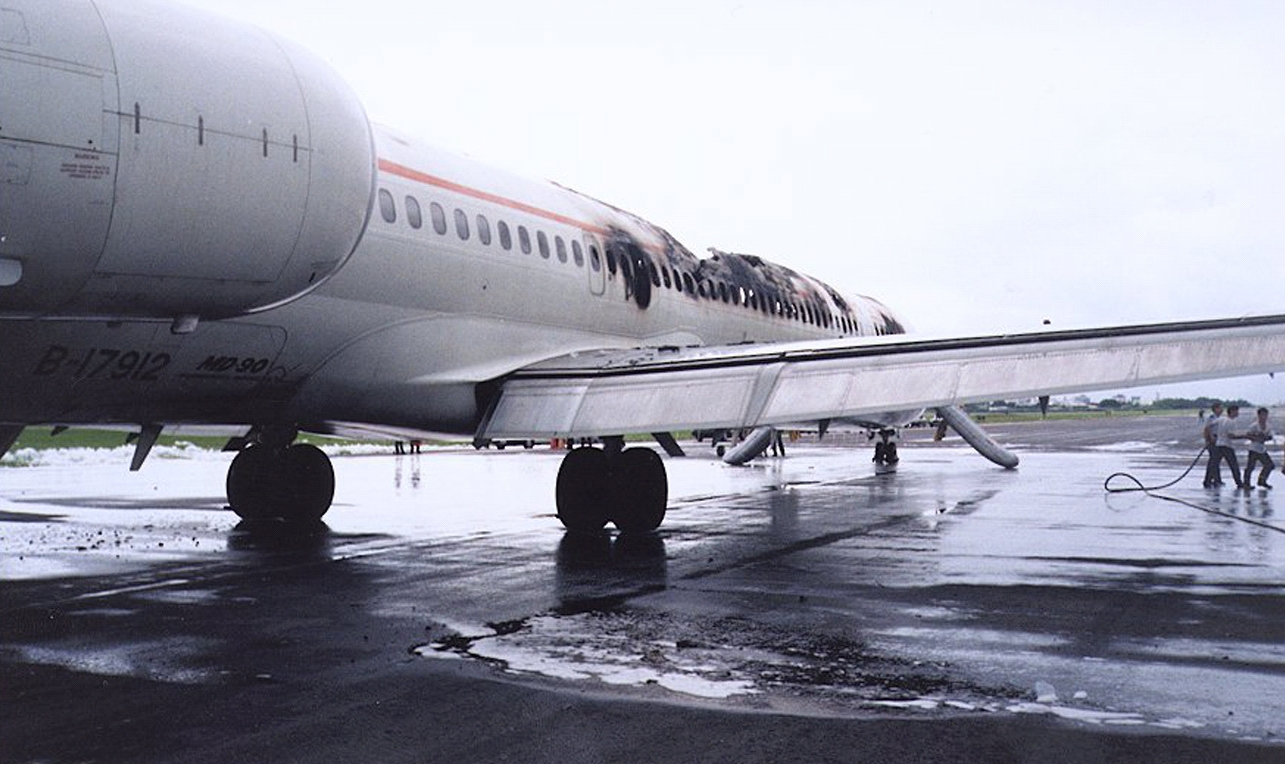
Aftermath

While the upper part of the fuselage was completely destroyed, all 96 of the occupants were evacuated. 14 passengers were seriously injured, while another 14 suffered minor injuries from the blast. Most of the injured passengers suffered burns. Ku Jing-chi, a passenger and the brother of former Taiwanese decathlete Ku Chin-shui, had serious injuries and died 47 days after the accident, while another passenger had a miscarriage of her 26-week-old unborn child.

== Investigation ==
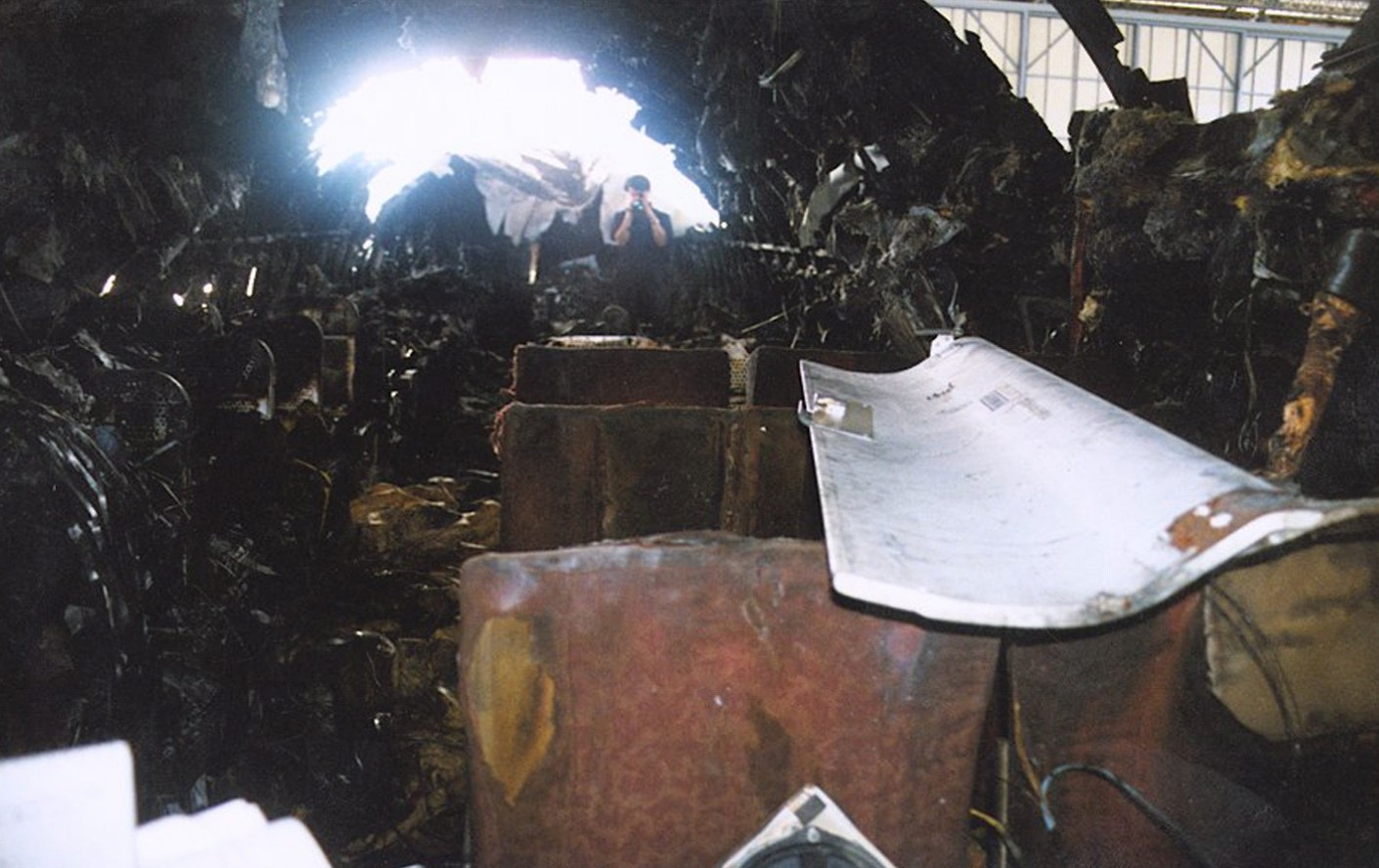
The aftermath of Flight 873's cabin

Following the accident, the Aviation Safety Council established an Accident Investigation Team. Initial findings revealed that the factors involved in the accident were not solely related to aviation safety. The investigation later revealed that Ku Chin-shui, who was absent from the flight, had given bottles of flammable liquid to his nephew to transport.

An Aviation Safety Council report said it was thought that the bottles were incorrectly sealed and gasoline fumes leaked, which later ignited when a motorbike battery in a nearby overhead luggage compartment was jostled, discharging an electric arc. Ku was initially sentenced to a 10-year prison term, which was shortened to 7 1/2 years upon appeal. The fifth retrial found him not guilty after the judge said that although Ku had asked his nephew to carry a bottle of bleach in his luggage, the fragments that tested positive for gasoline were not limited to the fragments of the bottle.

== In popular culture ==
The accident is featured in the third episode of Season 20 of Mayday, also known as Air Crash Investigation and Air Disasters. The episode is titled "Explosive Touchdown".

This incident is featured in Episode 115 of the Rooster Teeth podcast Black Box Down.

== See also ==
- British Airtours Flight 28M, another aircraft fire on the ground
- China Airlines Flight 120, another aircraft fire on the ground
- ValuJet Airlines Flight 592, another accident involving hazardous materials on board igniting a fire
- Air Busan Flight 391, another aircraft that suffered an overhead bin fire due to hazardous materials
