= Uni Air =

Regional airline of Taiwan

UNI Air 立榮航空

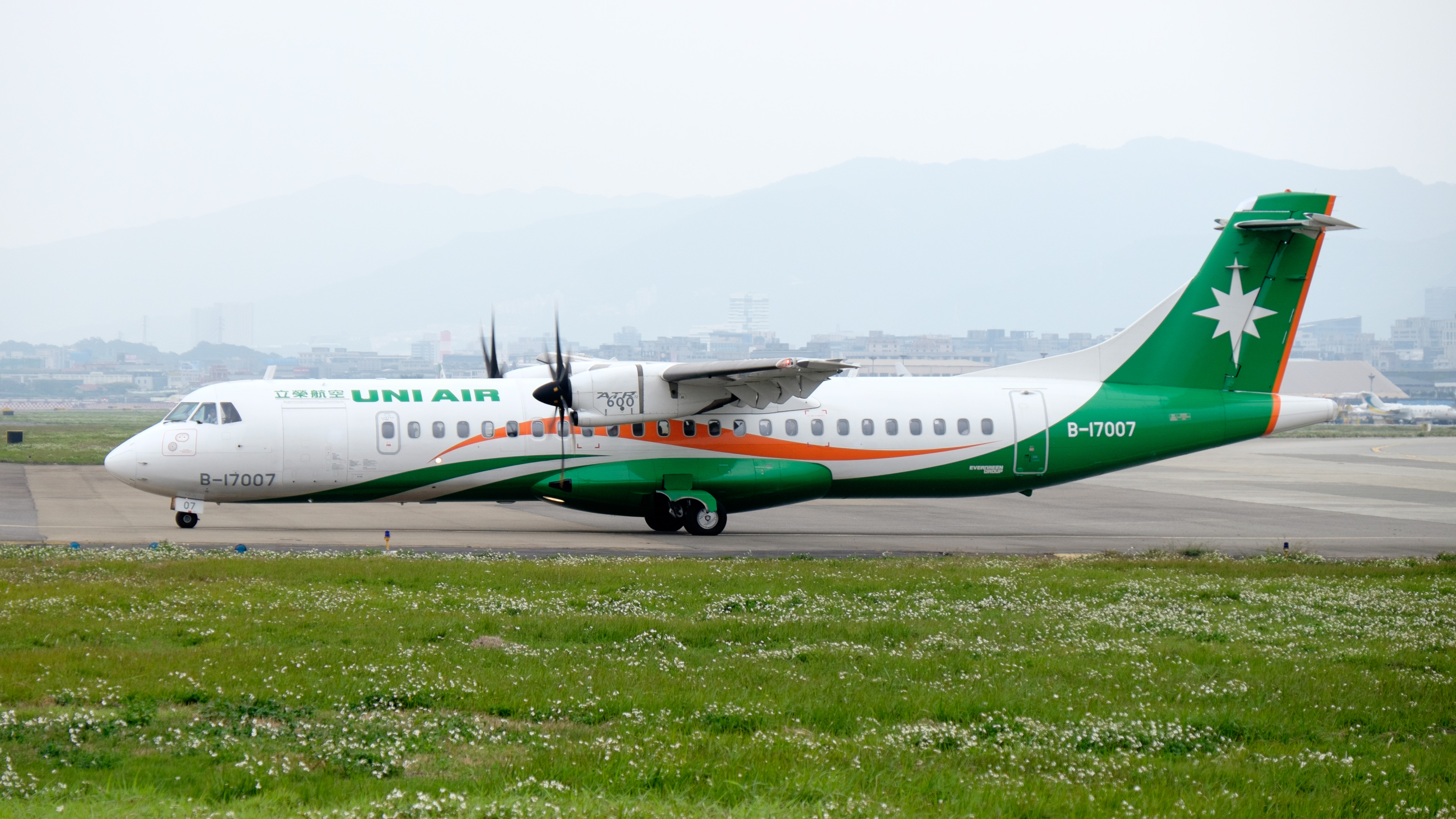
- UNI Air ATR 72-600
IATA	ICAO	Call sign
B7	UIA	GLORY
- Founded: 1988; 38 years ago (as Makung International Airlines)
- Commenced operations: March 12, 1996; 30 years ago (as UNI Air)
- Hubs: Taipei–Songshan
- Focus cities: Kaohsiung; Taichung
- Frequent-flyer program: Infinity MileageLands
- Fleet size: 14
- Destinations: 27
- Parent company: Evergreen Group
- Headquarters: Zhongshan, Taipei, Taiwan
- Key people: Peter Chen (president); Chang Kuo-Wei (chairman)
- Website: www.uniair.com.tw

Uni Air
- Traditional Chinese: 立榮航空
- Simplified Chinese: 立荣航空
Transcriptions
Standard Mandarin
- Hanyu Pinyin: Lìróng Hángkōng
Southern Min
- Hokkien POJ: Lïp-êng Hâng-khong

Former name
- Traditional Chinese: 馬公航空
- Simplified Chinese: 马公航空
- Literal meaning: Magong International Airlines
Transcriptions
Standard Mandarin
- Hanyu Pinyin: Mǎgōng Hángkōng
Southern Min
- Hokkien POJ: Má-keng Hâng-khong

UNI Airways (Chinese: 立榮航空; pinyin: Lìróng Hángkōng; Pe̍h-ōe-jī: Lïp-êng Háng-khong) is a Taiwanese regional airline based in Zhongshan, Taipei, Taiwan. With an operational focus on domestic routes, UNI Air is a subsidiary of Evergreen Group, making it a sister airline of the mainline operator EVA Air. It was known as Makung International Airlines (馬公航空) until 1996, when EVA Air took a majority share of the airline. In 1998, the airline merged with Great China Airlines (大華航空) and Taiwan Airways (臺灣航空), which EVA Air also had interests in, to form UNI Airways (UNI Air).

== Overview ==
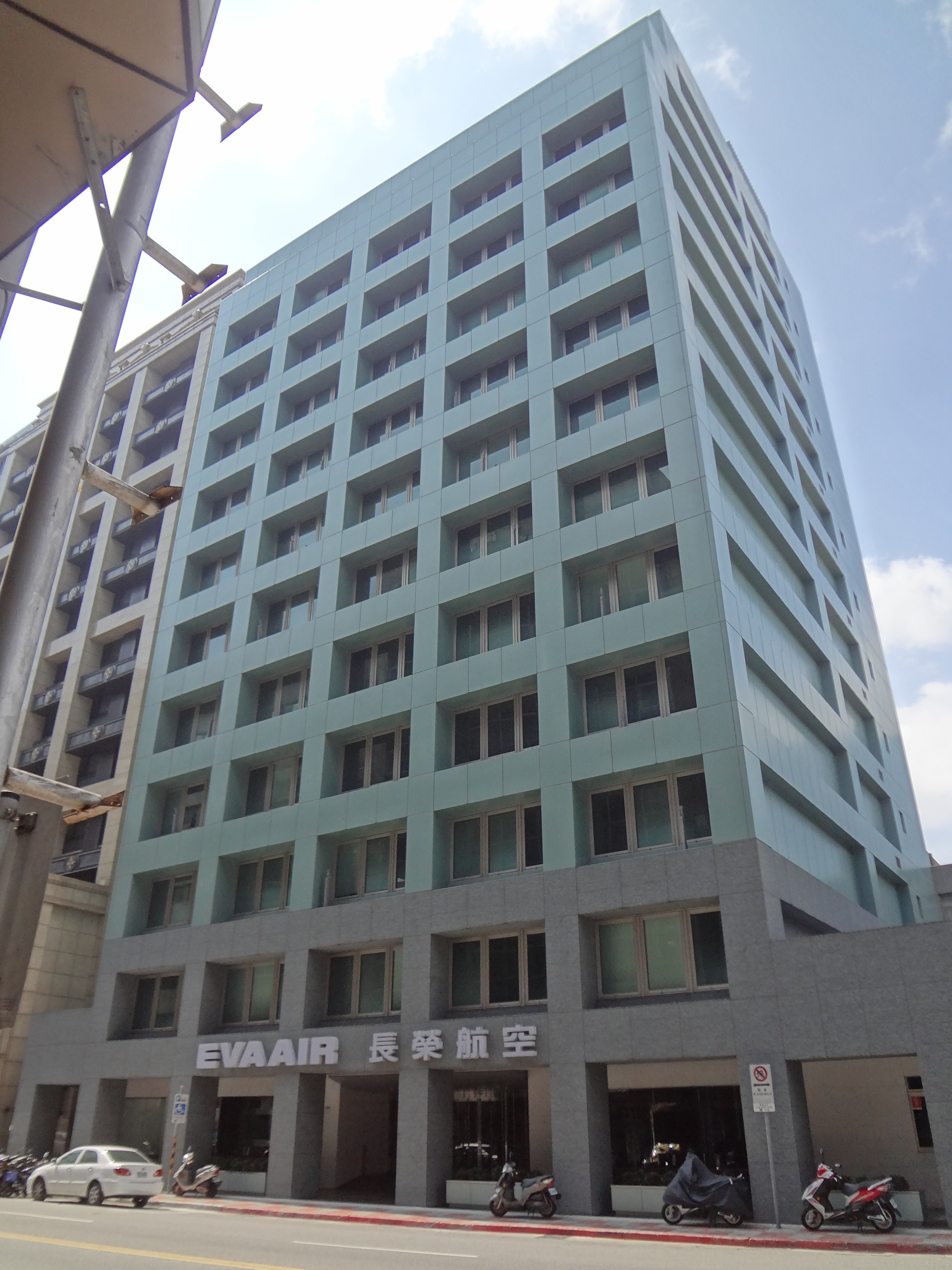
Headquarters in Taipei

UNI Air has operated two-class services, with domestic business- and economy-class seating. Business-class passengers have access to EVA Air's Evergreen Lounges. UNI Air's predecessor, Makung International Airlines, operated a fleet of BAe 146 series jet aircraft. These aircraft were sold when UNI Air was formed. UNI Air's IATA Code is B7, its ICAO code is UIA, and its callsign is Glory, in reference to its sister company Uniglory Shipping Corporation. In 2012, UNI Air unveiled a new livery and tail/logo on the MD-90, the Q300 and its new ATR 72-600 aircraft.

The airline has had the largest market share in the domestic Taiwan market in recent years, and has expanded to include international flights. A few of its former McDonnell Douglas MD-90 and current ATR 72 aircraft were repainted and flew for parent carrier EVA Air due to overcapacity. In recent years, UNI Air has launched services to international destinations from the southern Taiwanese port city of Kaohsiung. In 2007, the airline received permission to begin flights to Japan.

== Destinations ==
The airline operates mainly to domestic and China destinations and scheduled international flights to Bangkok, Ho Chi Minh City and Seoul. It also offers chartered flights to Surabaya and Jeju from Kaohsiung. UNI Air's destinations are:

Country	City	Airport	Notes	Refs
China	Chongqing	Chongqing Jiangbei International Airport	Terminated	
China	Dalian	Dalian Zhoushuizi International Airport		
China	Fuzhou	Fuzhou Changle International Airport	Terminated	
China	Hangzhou	Hangzhou Xiaoshan International Airport		
China	Huangshan	Huangshan Tunxi International Airport	Terminated	
China	Nanjing	Nanjing Lukou International Airport		
China	Ningbo	Ningbo Lishe International Airport	Terminated	
China	Qingdao	Qingdao Jiaodong International Airport		
China	Qingdao	Qingdao Liuting International Airport	Airport closed	
China	Shenyang	Shenyang Taoxian International Airport		
China	Shenzhen	Shenzhen Bao'an International Airport		
China	Wuxi	Wuxi Shuofang Airport		
China	Xiamen	Xiamen Gaoqi International Airport	Terminated	
Malaysia	Kota Kinabalu	Kota Kinabalu International Airport	Terminated	
Philippines	Manila	Ninoy Aquino International Airport	Terminated	
Taiwan	Beigan	Beigan Airport		
Taiwan	Chiayi	Chiayi Airport		
Taiwan	Hengchun	Hengchun Airport	Terminated	
Taiwan	Kaohsiung	Kaohsiung International Airport	Focus city	
Taiwan	Kinmen	Kinmen Airport		
Taiwan	Magong	Penghu Airport		
Taiwan	Nangan	Nangan Airport		
Taiwan	Pingtung	Pingtung Airport	Terminated	
Taiwan	Taichung	Taichung International Airport	Focus city	
Taiwan	Tainan	Tainan Airport		
Taiwan	Taipei	Songshan Airport	Hub	
Taiwan	Taipei	Taoyuan International Airport		
Taiwan	Taitung	Taitung Airport		
South Korea	Seoul	Incheon International Airport	Terminated	
Vietnam	Ho Chi Minh City	Tan Son Nhat International Airport		

=== Codeshare agreements ===
UNI Air has codeshare agreements with the following airlines:

- Air China
- EVA Air
- Shandong Airlines
- Shenzhen Airlines

=== Interline agreements ===
UNI Air has interline agreements with the following airlines:

- Taiwan High Speed Rail (railway)

== Fleet ==
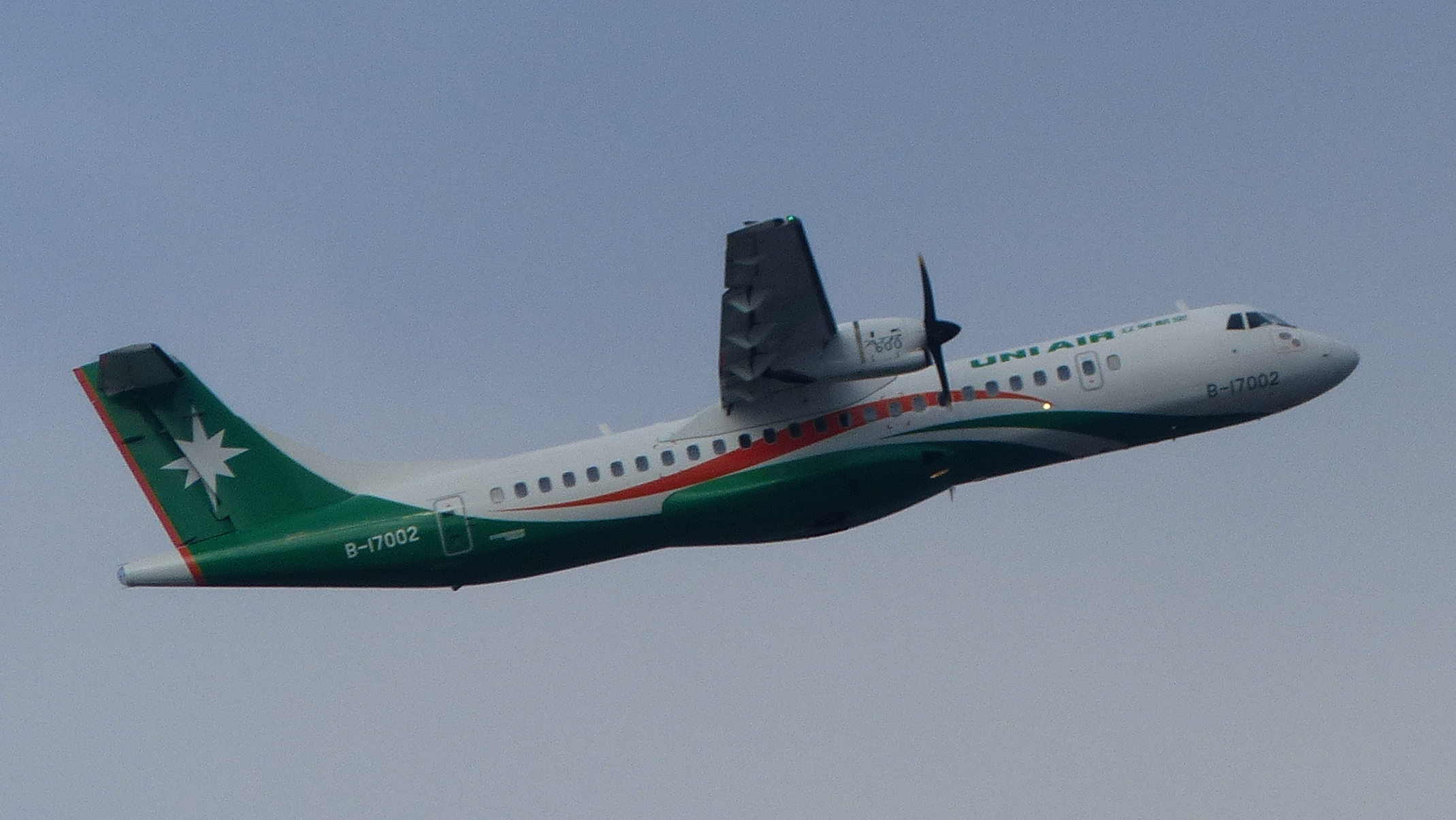
UNI Air ATR 72-600

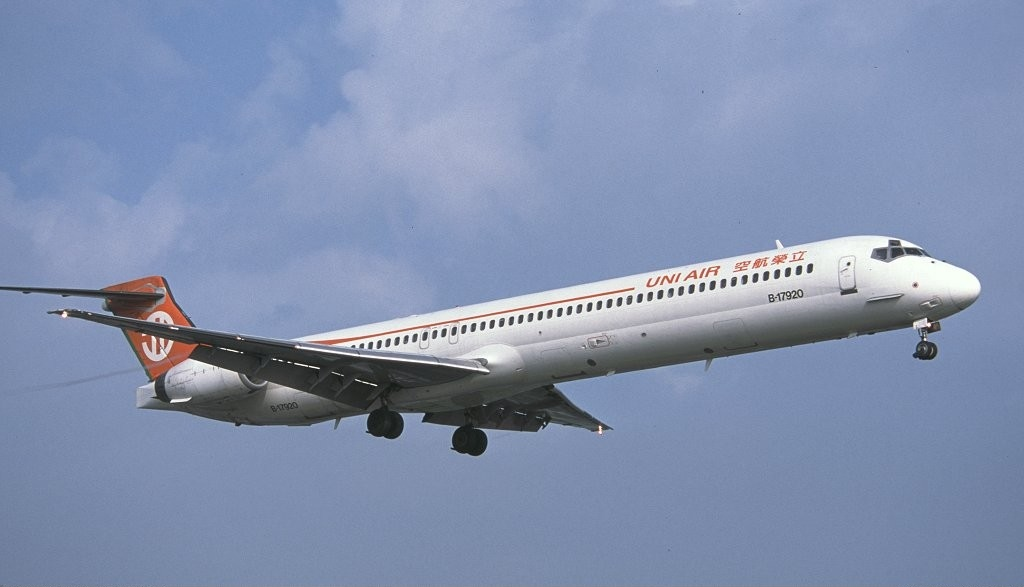
A former UNI Air McDonnell Douglas MD-90-30 in 2001

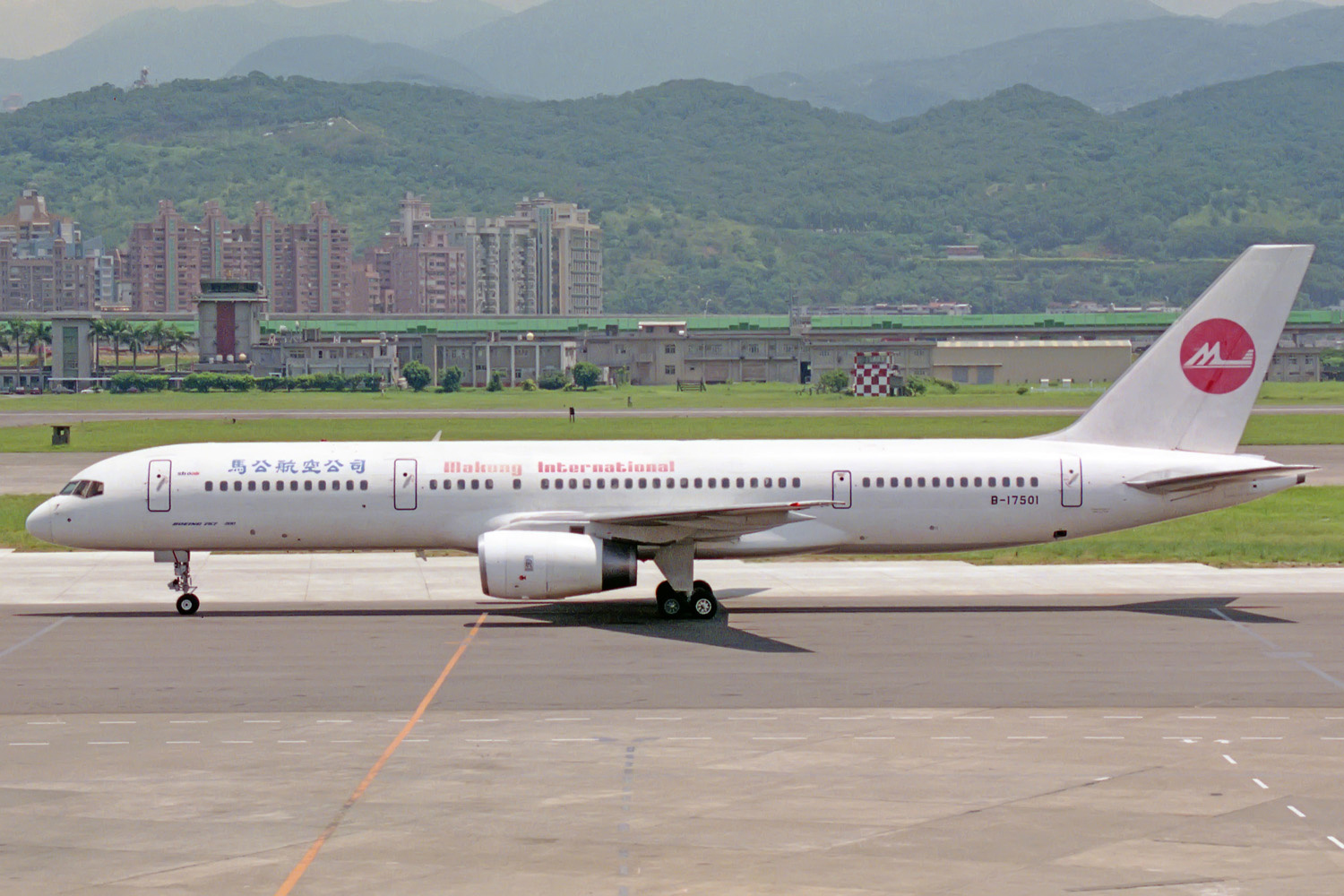
A Boeing 757-200 of Makung Airlines (previous name of Uni Air) in 1996. The airline had only one Boeing 757 in their fleet.

=== Current fleet ===
As of August 2025, Uni Air operates the following aircraft:

UNI Air fleet
Aircraft	In service	Orders	Passengers			Notes
Aircraft	In service	Orders	J	Y	Total	Notes
ATR 72-600	14	19	—	70	70	Order with 3 purchase rights. Deliveries from 2027.
Total	14	19				

=== Former fleet ===
UNI Air (including its predecessors Great China Airlines and Makung International Airlines) has previously operated the following aircraft types:

UNI Air former fleet
Aircraft	Total	Introduced	Retired	Notes
Airbus A321-200	2	2015	2022	
Boeing 757-200	1	1995	1996	
BAe 146-300	5	1990	1999	
De Havilland Canada Dash 8-100	4	1988	1996	
De Havilland Canada Dash 8-200	1	1991	2009	
De Havilland Canada Dash 8-300	2	1991	1997	Sold to Eastern Australia Airlines and De Havilland Canada.
De Havilland Canada Dash 8-300	12	1993	2014	
De Havilland Canada Dash 8-300	1	2001	2014	Sold to Hawker Pacific.
McDonnell Douglas MD-90-30	14	1996	2016	One burned as Flight 873.

== Accidents and incidents ==
- On 24 August 1999, Flight 873, a McDonnell Douglas MD-90, landed at Hualien Airport and was rolling on Runway 21 when an explosion was heard in the front section of the passenger cabin, followed by smoke and fire. The pilot brought the aircraft to a stop on the runway and fire squads rushed to the scene to extinguish the fire. While the upper part of the fuselage was completely destroyed, 90 passengers plus the crew of six were safely evacuated. 14 passengers were seriously injured, and another 14 suffered minor injuries. Most of the injured passengers suffered burns. There was eventually one death due to fragments produced by the explosion striking one passenger.
- On 10 May 2021, Flight 9091, an ATR 72-600, clipped its main landing gear and tail skid on the perimeter wall at Nangan Airport after the pilots initiated a late go-around due to fog during a non-precision approach. The pilots returned to Songshan Airport, where they landed without injury, although the aircraft and runway were damaged. The cause was determined to be the pilot's loss of situational awareness during approach and not following procedure to immediately go around after losing sight of the runway.

== See also ==
- List of airlines of Taiwan
- List of companies of Taiwan
- List of airports in Taiwan
- Transportation in Taiwan
- Air transport in Taiwan
- EVA Air
- Chang Yung-fa
- Evergreen Group
