= Ku Chin-shui =

Amis Taiwanese decathlete and pole vaulter

Personal information
- Native name: 古金水
- Nationality: Taiwanese
- Born: 15 January 1960 Hualien City, Taiwan
- Died: 25 May 2016 (aged 56) Taipei, Taiwan
- Height: 180 cm (5 ft 11 in)
- Weight: 73 kg (161 lb)

Chinese name
- Chinese: 古金水
Transcriptions
Standard Mandarin
- Hanyu Pinyin: Gǔ Jīnshuǐ
- Wade–Giles: Ku Chin-shui

Sport
- Country: Chinese Taipei
- Sport: Men's track and field
- Event(s): Decathlon, pole vault

Achievements and titles
- Personal best: Decathlon: 7623 pts (1990)
Medal record
Men's athletics
Representing Chinese Taipei
Asian Games
Silver medal – second place	1990 Beijing	Decathlon
Asian Championships
Gold medal – first place	1985 Jakarta	Decathlon
Silver medal – second place	1983 Kuwait	Pole vault
Silver medal – second place	1983 Kuwait	Decathlon
Bronze medal – third place	1987 Singapore	Pole vault
Bronze medal – third place	1989 New Delhi	Pole vault
Bronze medal – third place	1991 Kuala Lumpur	Pole vault

Ku Chin-shui (Chinese: 古金水; pinyin: Gǔ Jīnshuǐ; Wade–Giles: Ku Chin-shui, 15 January 1960 – 25 May 2016) was an Amis Taiwanese decathlete and pole vaulter. He medaled for Chinese Taipei at the Asian Athletics Championships six times, winning one gold medal, two silver medals, and three bronze medals. At the 1990 Asian Games, he earned a silver medal in the decathlon. Upon retiring from athletics, he became a physical education teacher.

== Post-athletic life ==
On 24 August 1999, an explosion on board a landed Uni Air plane, Flight 873, injured 28 people and killed Ku Jing-chi (C: 古金池, P: Gǔ Jīnchí), the older brother of Ku Chin-shui.

A report from the Aviation Safety Council (ASC) stated that the cause of the fire was the interaction of two luggage items that happened to be in overhead compartments. Firstly, gasoline had leaked from a plastic bottle and, secondly, a motorcycle battery had been jostled, causing an electric arc that ignited fumes from the gasoline.

Prosecutors accused Ku Chin-shui of asking his nephew to take gasoline on the flight. Ku was convicted and sentenced to ten years in prison. Upon appeal, the sentence was shortened to seven and a half years. After a fifth retrial, he was declared not guilty. The ASC had commissioned an analysis from the Chungshan Institute of Science and Technology, which said the ASC's simulation environment differed from that of the aircraft which had exploded."

The court case caused Ku to lose his teaching position, and he worked part-time at a steel factory until 2008, when he returned to teaching full-time.

Ku was diagnosed with cancer in 2014 and died of plasma cell leukemia on 25 May 2016 at National Taiwan University Hospital in Taipei. Aged 56 at the time of his death, Ku was survived by his wife and two children.

== International competitions ==
Year	Competition	Venue	Position	Event	Notes
1983	Asian Championships	Kuwait City, Kuwait	2nd	Pole vault	4.80 m
1983	Asian Championships	Kuwait City, Kuwait	2nd	Decathlon	7438 pts
1984	Olympic Games	Los Angeles, United States	16th	Decathlon	7629 pts
1985	Asian Championships	Jakarta, Indonesia	1st	Decathlon	7538 pts^{[nb1]}
1987	Asian Championships	Singapore	3rd	Pole vault	5.10 m
1989	Asian Championships	New Delhi, India	3rd	Pole vault	5.20 m
1990	Asian Games	Beijing, China	2nd	Decathlon	7623 pts
1991	Asian Championships	Kuala Lumpur, Malaysia	3rd	Pole vault	5.10 m

- ^{nb1} This performance was calculated using the 1977 IAAF scoring tables and in the modern 1985 IAAF tables, is worth 7614 points

== See also ==
- List of Asian Games medalists in athletics
- Uni Air Flight 873, the related aircraft accident
