= Boeing X-66 =

Experimental aircraft

X-66
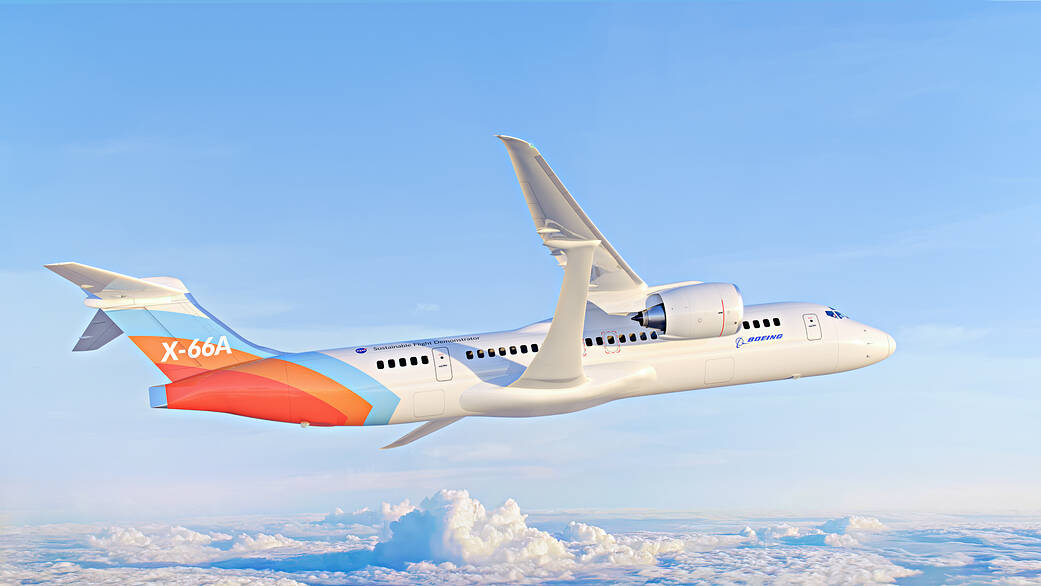
- X-66 rendering showing its trussed high wing configuration

General information
- Type: Experimental aircraft
- Manufacturer: Boeing
- Status: On pause
- Primary user: NASA
- Number built: 1

History
- Developed from: McDonnell Douglas MD-90

The Boeing X-66 was an experimental airliner that was under development by Boeing. It was part of the X-plane series created in collaboration with NASA and the Sustainable Flight Demonstrator program. It used an extra-long and thin wing design stabilized by diagonal bracing struts, which is known as a Transonic Truss-Braced Wing. The aircraft configuration was based on research studies referred to as "Subsonic Ultra-Green Aircraft Reach (SUGAR)" which extensively studied truss-bracing and hybrid electric technologies.

== Development ==
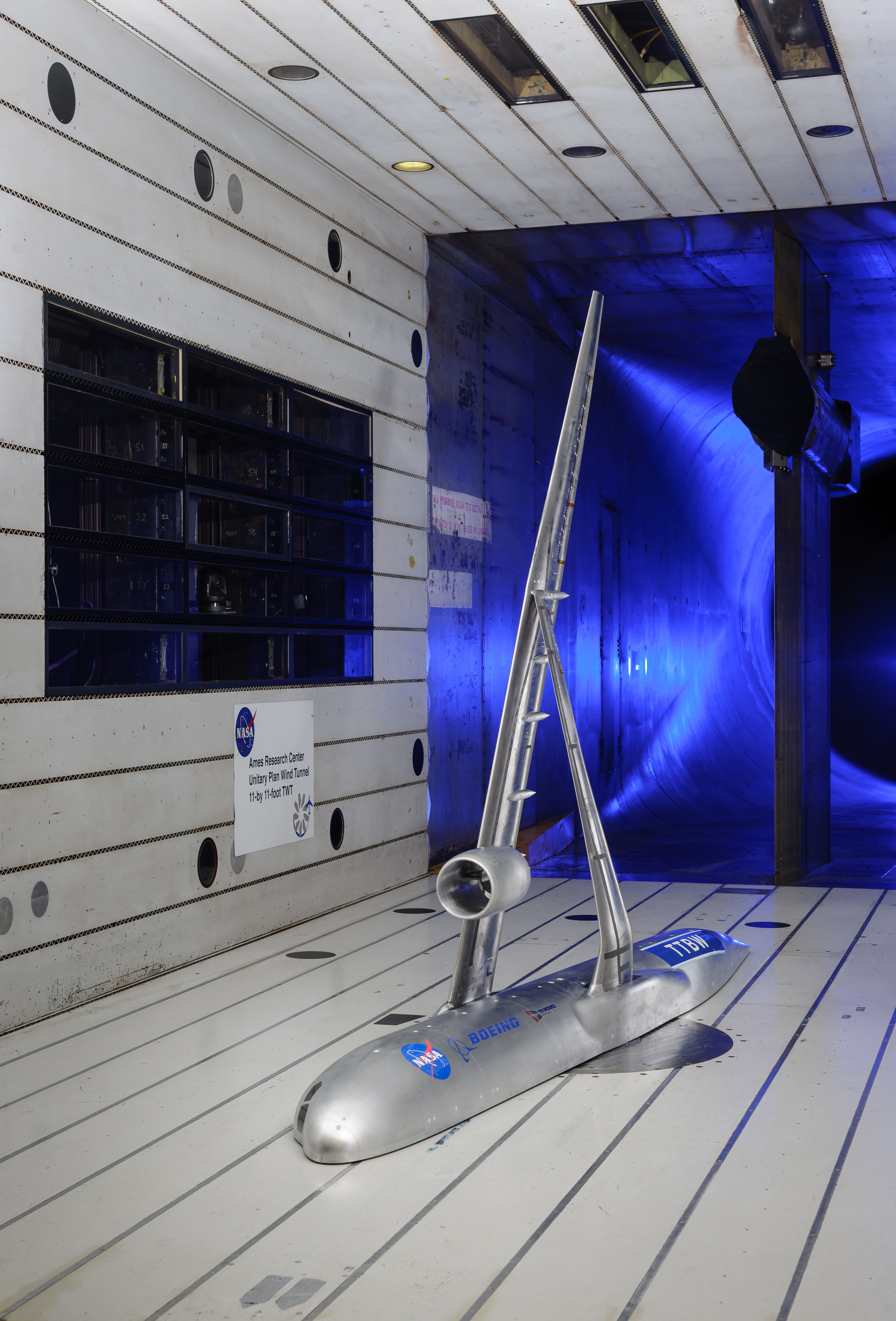
A model of the Transonic Truss-Braced Wing aircraft in a wind tunnel at NASA's Ames Research Center

By early 2019, following extensive wind tunnel testing at NASA Ames Research Center, an optimized truss and more sweep for the 170 ft (52 m) span wing allowed flying higher and faster, up from Mach 0.70–0.75 to Mach 0.80 like current jetliners. Compared to aircraft with cantilevered wings, fuel burn will be reduced by 8-10%, and the technology should be ready by 2030-2035. Aspect ratios up to 27 were evaluated, up from 8-10 for current narrow-bodies. The design was presented at the January 2019 American Institute of Aeronautics and Astronautics (AIAA) conference and the wing folds outboard of the truss to enable its use of airport gates like the 118 ft (36 m)-span 737. (ICAO aerodrome code C)

Later the wing was improved with 20° of sweep and moved forward, the truss section was optimised, tapered with an increased root chord, and optimized with a trailing edge with forward sweep that generates lift. It was tested in early 2019 at the NASA Ames 11 ft (3.4 m) transonic tunnel, then later in 2019 at the 14 by 22 ft (4.3 by 6.7 m) subsonic tunnel at NASA Langley. A full-scale X-plane is being developed and tested under NASA's Ultra-Efficient Subsonic Transport (UEST) plan, outlined in the New Aviation Horizons flight demonstration from 2023. Boeing proposed to modify an MD-80 powered by turbofan engines, but it could test a series/parallel hybrid electric propulsor based on Rolls-Royce LibertyWorks' EVE concept of a geared turbofan. A 1.5 MW (2,000 hp) electric motor/generator mounted between the compressor and the variable pitch fan, fed by batteries to boost the takeoff and climb, allows for a smaller engine and improves efficiency by 4.5% over a 3,500 nmi (4,000 mi; 6,500 km) mission. A tail-mounted BLI fan would ingest and reenergize the slow airflow over the fuselage.

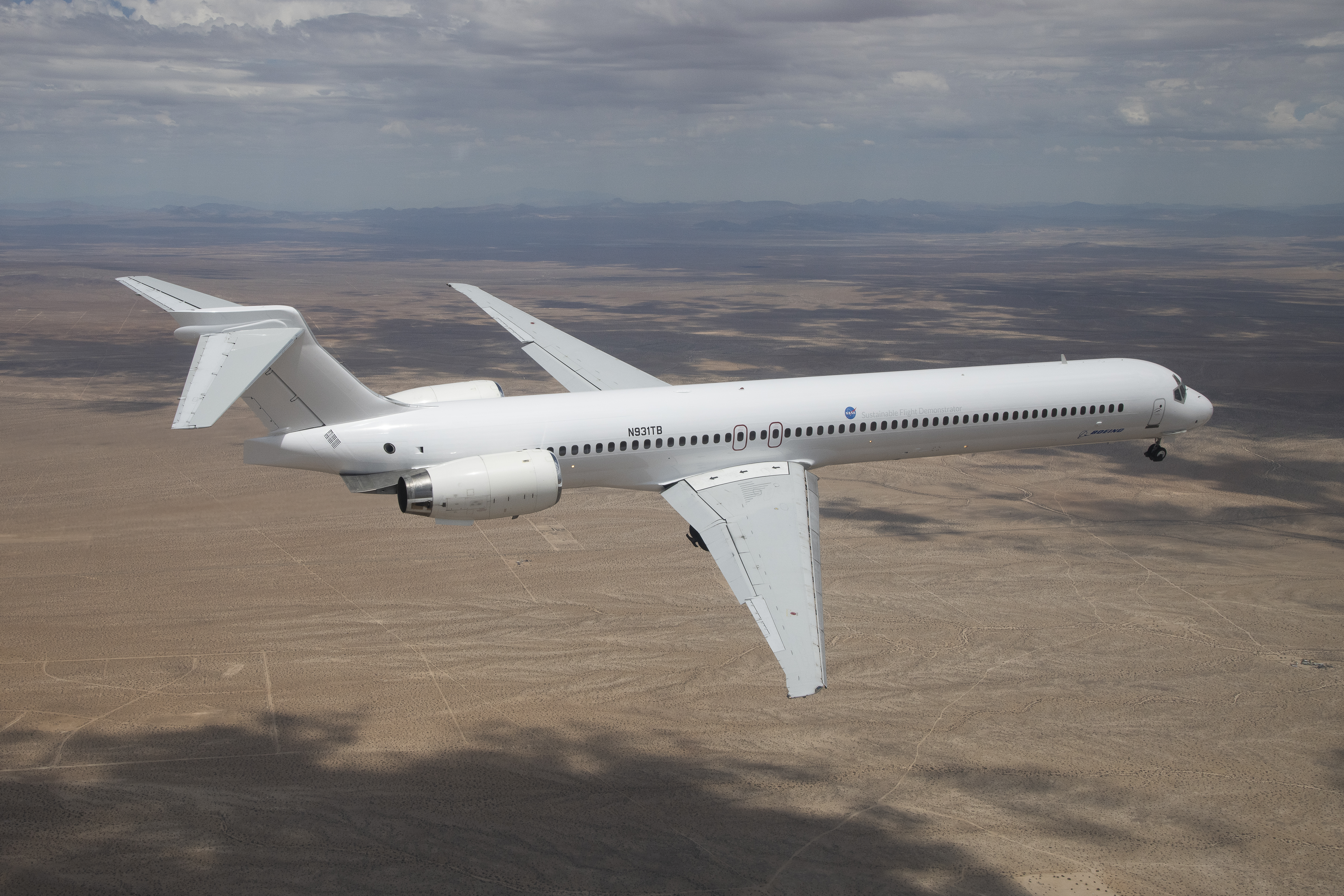
The ex-China Northern Airlines, ex-Delta Air Lines McDonnell Douglas MD-90 to be modified

A full-scale demonstrator based on the McDonnell Douglas/Boeing MD-90 was announced on January 18, 2023, with NASA funding $425 million over seven years while Boeing and its partners will invest the remainder of the agreed funding, estimated at about $725 million. Separately, Boeing had already internally invested $110 million in sustainable aviation research. Combined with better propulsion and materials, efficiency is targeted at 30% better than current Boeing 737 MAX and Airbus A320neo. Using a shortened MD-90 airframe and CFM International RISE engines, the demonstrator is scheduled to fly in 2028, providing the basis for a possible family of 130-to-210-seat aircraft. The full-scale Sustainable Flight Demonstrator (SFD) is designated "X-66A". In August 2023, the MD-90 airframe was ferried to Palmdale Regional Airport for complete rebuild into the X-66.

In June 2024, Boeing and Pratt & Whitney announced that a dedicated derivative of the geared turbofan (GTF) engine PW1500G/1900G series, named PW102XG, will be installed. This selection was made due to weight concerns regarding the previously anticipated application of a PW1100G derivative.

On April 24, 2025, Boeing announced that they have indefinitely paused the X-66 program, but will continue sustainable thin-wing research.
