= McDonnell Douglas MD-90 =

Single-aisle airliner by McDonnell Douglas

MD-90
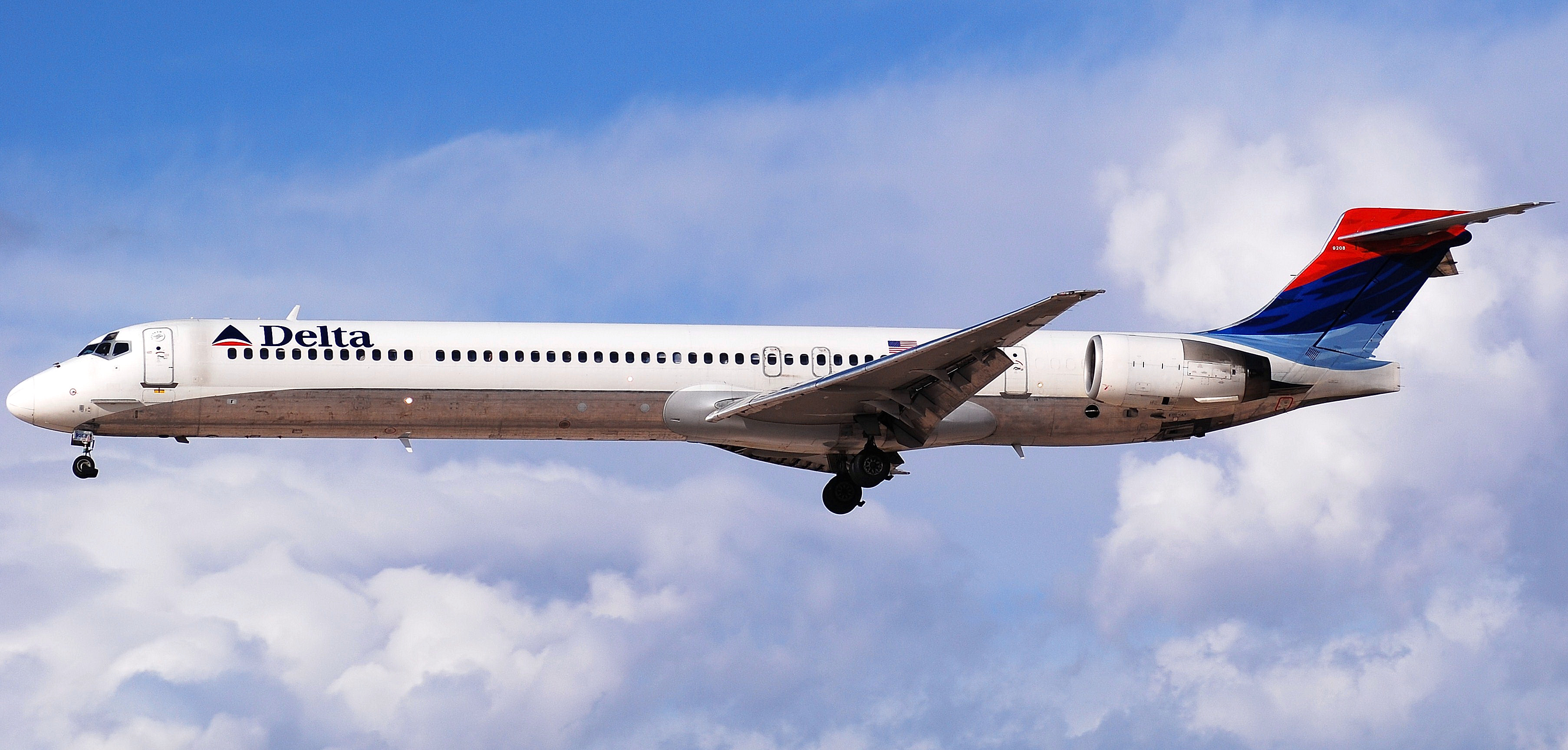
- An MD-90 of Delta Air Lines, both its launch customer and final operator, in 2008

General information
- Type: Narrow-body jet airliner
- National origin: United States
- Manufacturer: McDonnell Douglas (1993–1997); Boeing Commercial Airplanes (1997–2000); Shanghai Aircraft Manufacturing Company (under license)
- Status: Retired from commercial use
- Primary users: Delta Air Lines (historical) Saudi Arabian Airlines (historical); Japan Airlines (historical); NASA (X-66)
- Number built: 116

History
- Manufactured: 1993–2000
- Introduction date: 1995 with Delta Air Lines
- First flight: February 22, 1993
- Retired: June 2, 2020 (commercially)
- Developed from: McDonnell Douglas MD-80
- Variants: McDonnell Douglas MD-94X; Boeing 717 (MD-95)
- Developed into: Boeing X-66

The McDonnell Douglas (later Boeing) MD-90 is a retired American five-abreast single-aisle airliner developed by McDonnell Douglas from the earlier MD-80. The airliner was produced by the developer company until 1997 and then by Boeing Commercial Airplanes. It was a stretched derivative of the MD-80 and thus part of the DC-9 family. After the more fuel-efficient IAE V2500 high-bypass turbofan was selected, Delta Air Lines became the launch customer on November 14, 1989. The MD-90 first flew on February 22, 1993, and the first delivery was in February 1995 to Delta.

The MD-90 competed with the Airbus A320ceo family and the Boeing 737 Next Generation. Its 5 ft (1.4 m) longer fuselage seats 153 passengers in a mixed configuration over up to 2,455 nautical miles [nmi] (4,547 km; 2,825 mi), making it the largest member of the DC-9 family. It kept the MD-88's electronic flight instrument system (EFIS).

The shrunken derivative of MD-80 or shorter variant of MD-90, originally marketed as MD-95, was later renamed the Boeing 717 following McDonnell Douglas' merger with Boeing in 1997.

Production ended in 2000 after 116 deliveries. Delta Air Lines flew the final MD-90 passenger flight on June 2, 2020. It was briefly retired before being put into testing with Boeing Commercial Airplanes for the NASA X-66 program. It was involved in three hull-loss accidents with only one fatality being a fire related or non-aeronautical accident.

== Development ==
The DC-9 series, the first generation of the DC-9 family with five members or variants (DC-9-10 / DC-9 Series 10, Series 20, Series 30, Series 40, and Series 50) and ten production versions (Series 11, Series 12, Series 14, Series 15, Series 21, Series 31, Series 32, Series 33, Series 34, Series 41, and Series 51), was a commercial success with 976 units built when production ended in 1982. The aircraft series was an all-new design, using two rear fuselage-mounted turbofan engines, a T-tail configuration, and a narrow-body fuselage design with five-abreast seating for 80 to 135 passengers. The success prompted the manufacturer to further develop the first generation DC-9 family into its second generation.

=== Baseline: MD-80 ===
The MD-80 series, the first derivative or the second generation of the DC-9 family, entered service in 1980. The aircraft series was originally designated as Series 80 or stylized as the Super 80, which was a 14 ft 3 in (4.34 m) lengthened Series 50 with a higher maximum take-off weight (MTOW) and higher fuel capacity, as well as next-generation Pratt and Whitney JT8D-200 series engines and an improved wing design. The MD-80 series has five variants or production versions, which are designated with a non-zero second digit similar to the DC-9 series, the MD-81, MD-82, MD-83, MD-87, and the MD-88. A total of 1,191 MD-80 airliners were delivered from 1980 to 1999, making it the company's most successful airliner model. In 1983, McDonnell Douglas began studies on derivatives of the MD-80 series or the third generation of the DC-9 family, which later became known as the MD-90 series.

=== Stretching: MD-90 ===
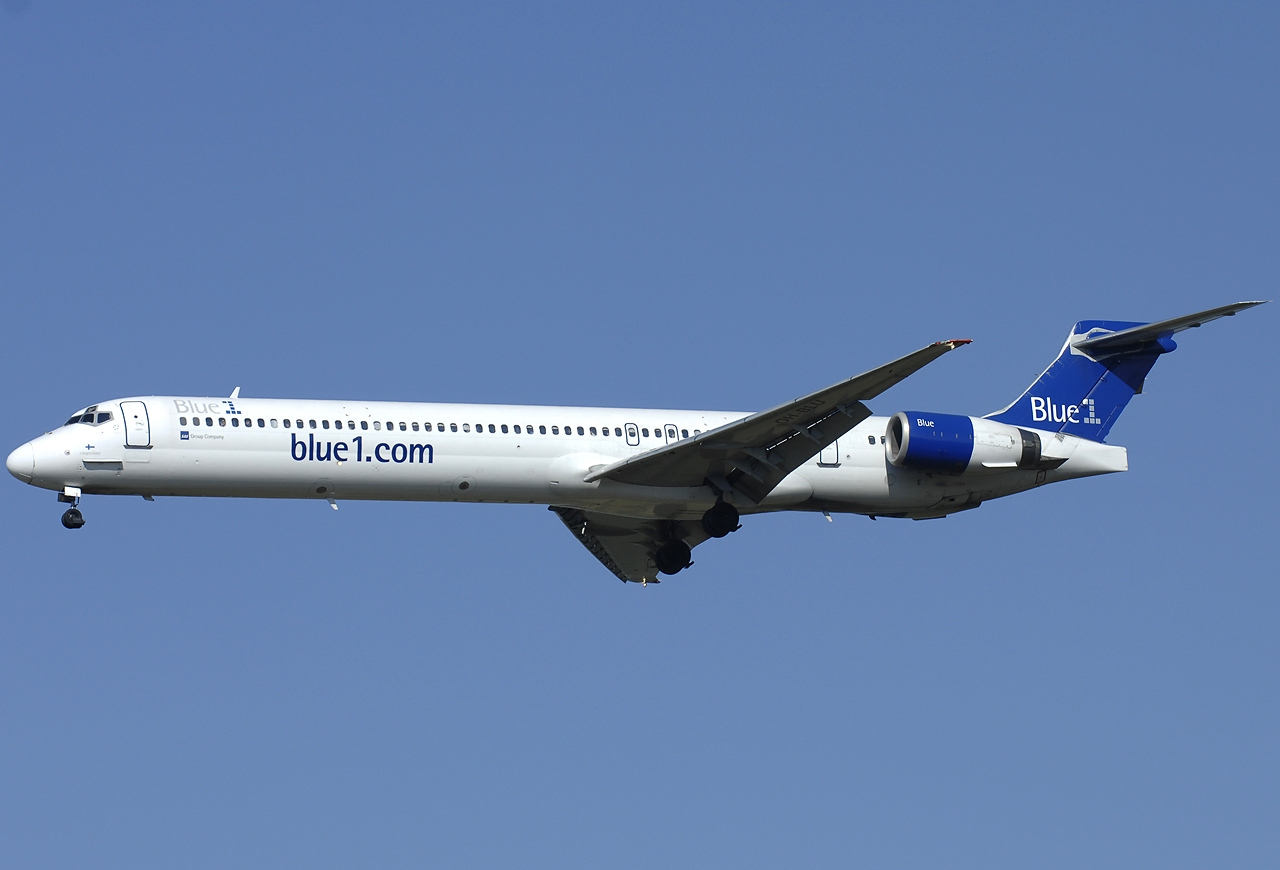
Blue1 MD-90-30 (2008)

The MD-90, the stretched derivative of the MD-80 and thus the third generation of the DC-9 family, was launched on November 14, 1989 when Delta Air Lines placed an order for 50 MD-90s, with options to purchase a further 110 aircraft. The type was 57-inch-longer (1.4 m) longer than MD-80 and featured a glass cockpit (electronic instrumentation) and more powerful, quieter, fuel-efficient IAE V2525-D5 engines, with the option of upgrading to an IAE V2528 engine.

==== Large stretch: MD-90X ====
Starting in late 1986, McDonnell Douglas began offering the MD-90X, a 25 ft (7.6 m) stretch of the MD-80. Unlike the MD-91 and MD-92 derivatives and the clean-sheet MD-94X proposal, the MD-90X would still use turbofan engines. The MD-90X would carry 180 passengers. Powered by the 26,500 lbf thrust (118 kN) CFM56-5 or V2500, the MD-90X replaced the MD-89 as McDonnell Douglas's proposed new turbofan offering, and it was designed to compete with the Boeing 757.

==== Propfan engine ====
===== Civilian: MD-94X =====
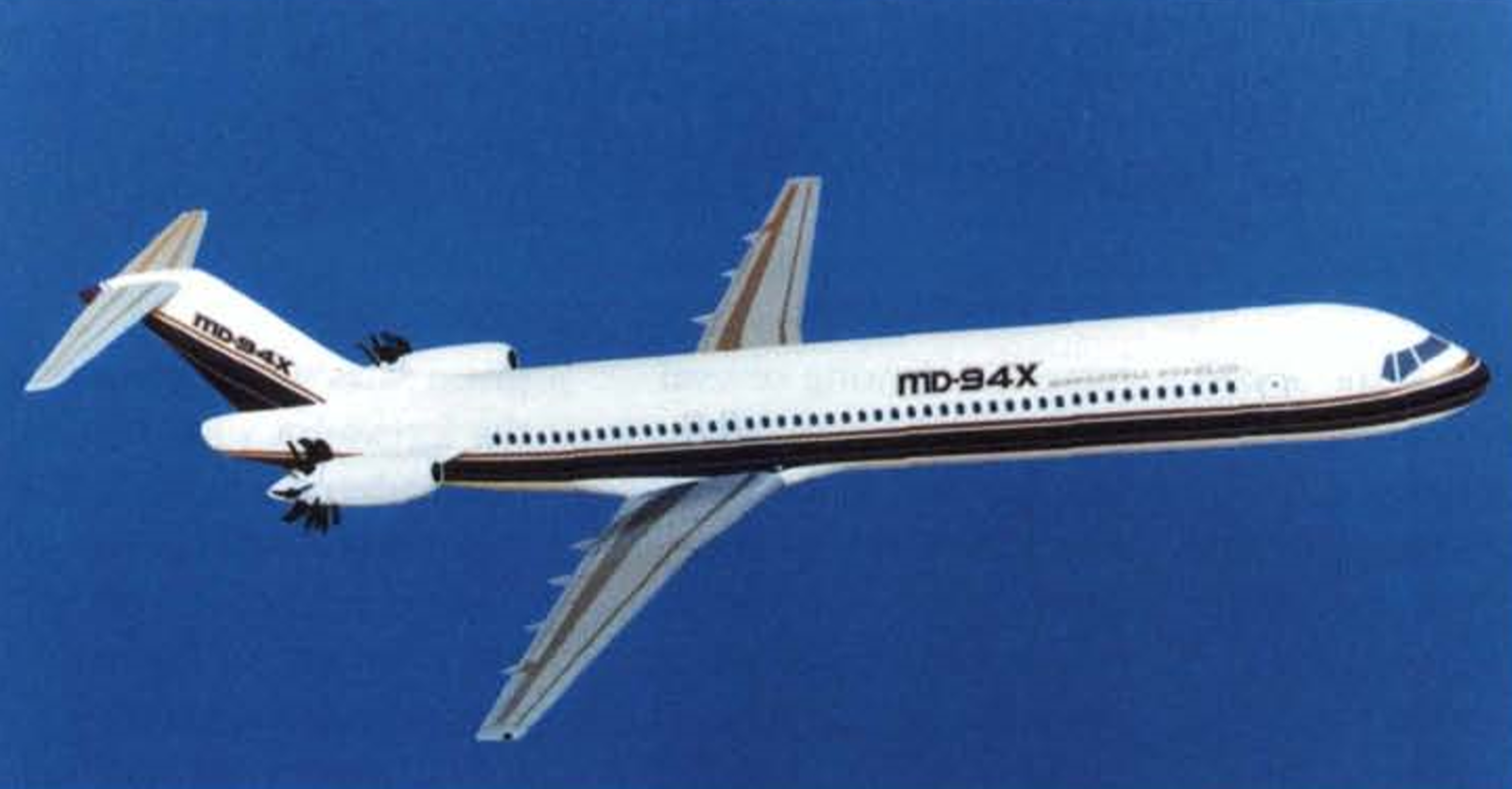
A concept illustration of the McDonnell Douglas MD-94X

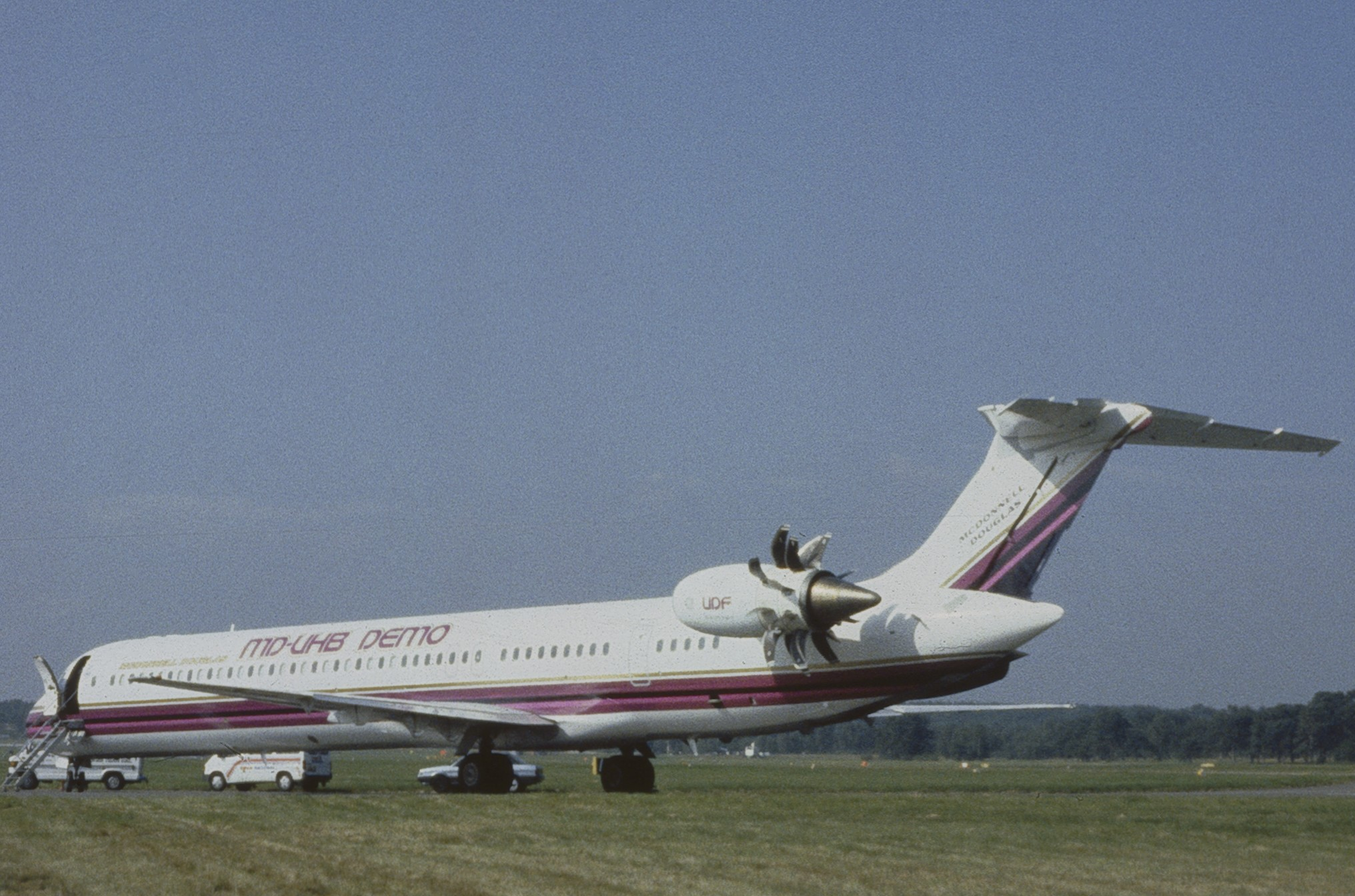
An MD-81 testbed for propfan engines at Farnborough Airshow 1988

For several years, McDonnell Douglas proposed powering the MD-90 with two unducted fan (UDF) or propfan engines, designated the MD-94X. Previously, an MD-81 was used as a testbed for propfan engines, such as the General Electric GE36 and the Pratt & Whitney/Allison 578-DX.

By mid-1989, it was clear that there was insufficient interest in propfan-powered aircraft, so the company reworked its proposals to instead feature the IAE V2500 turbofan, which was estimated to be $1 million cheaper than the GE36 and had already been certified for the Airbus A320. Within six weeks of eliminating the propfan option, the MD-90 secured a large launch order.

===== Military: P-9D =====
When the United States Navy wanted to replace its 125 Lockheed P-3 Orion anti-submarine warfare (ASW) aircraft, McDonnell Douglas offered the P-9D, which would be a propfan-powered version of the MD-91. The 25,000 lbf (110 kN) thrust engine would be either the General Electric GE36 or the Pratt & Whitney/Allison 578-DX. Lockheed won the competition with its P-3 derivative, the Lockheed P-7, but the replacement program was later canceled.

=== MD-95 ===
In 1991, McDonnell Douglas revealed that it was again considering developing a specialized 100-seat version of the MD-80, to be some 8 ft (2.4 m) shorter than the MD-87, powered with engines in the 16,000–17,000 lbf (71–76 kN) thrust class. At the Paris Airshow, McDonnell Douglas announced the development of a 105-seat version of the MD-80, designated MD-95. In early 1994, the MD-95 re-emerged as similar to the DC-9-30, its specified weight, dimensions, and fuel capacity being almost identical. Major changes included a fuselage "shrink" back to 124 ft 0 in (37.80 m) length (slightly longer than the DC-9-30), and the reversion to the original DC-9 wingspan of 93 ft 5 in (28.47 m). At this time, McDonnell Douglas said that it expected the MD-95 to become a family of aircraft with the capability of increased range and seating capacity.

The MD-95 was developed to satisfy the market need to replace early DC-9s, then approaching 30 years old. The MD-95 was a complete overhaul, going back to the original DC-9-30 design and applying new engines, cockpit and other more modern systems. McDonnell Douglas first offered the MD-95 for sale in 1994. The airliner was later renamed the Boeing 717-200 after McDonnell Douglas merged with Boeing in 1997.

=== Early operations ===
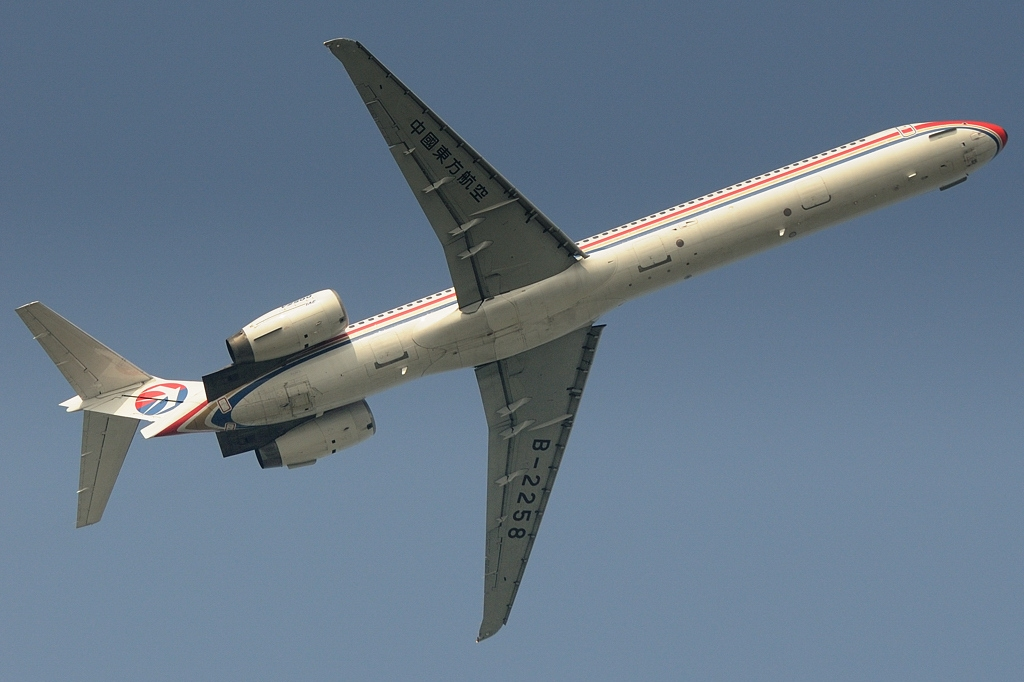
Bottom view of a China Eastern MD-90-30

The type first flew on February 22, 1993, and the first MD-90 was delivered to Delta in February 1995. No MD-90 orders were received after Boeing and McDonnell Douglas merged in 1997 due to internal competition with Boeing's 737. Delta Air Lines had initially placed a large order for the MD-90 to replace some aging Boeing 727s. After the Boeing-McDonnell Douglas merger, Delta canceled their remaining 19 MD-90 orders in favor of the Boeing 737–800.

=== Production ===
The MD-90 was produced adjacent to the Long Beach Airport in Long Beach, California, USA. A total of 40 MD-90s (later 20) were to be assembled under contract in Shanghai, People's Republic of China under the Trunkliner program, but Boeing's decision to phase out the MD-90 resulted in only two built by Shanghai Aircraft. MD-90 production at Long Beach, California ended in 2000 with the last airplane being delivered to Saudi Arabian Airlines, and MD-90T production at Shanghai ended in 2000. With 116 MD-90 aircraft produced, the MD-90 production run was the smallest among the DC-9 family. Two aircraft were also produced at Jiangwan Airfield in Shanghai, People's Republic of China.

=== Retirement ===
The main competitors of the MD-90 included the Airbus A320ceo and the Boeing 737-800. Aeronautical Engineers Inc (AEI) planned to begin an MD-90 freighter conversion program in 2016/2017 when the 737-400SF conversions were expected to be phased out, but canceled it in 2015. A converted MD-90 freighter would be longer than a 12-pallet capacity MD-80SF and would have one more pallet position, or 13 pallets total. However, as with the MD-80SF, the narrow fuselage cross-section only allows for non-standard 88" x 108" pallets or containers, which is the main disadvantage in cargo operations and limits its potential market. The main reason for AEI's decision not to continue the 13-pallet freighter program was the limited availability of MD-90 in the market. At the time, fewer than 100 aircraft were still active, most of which were in Delta Air Lines fleet. On June 2, 2020, Delta operated its last MD-90 on the type's final commercial flights, and so the MD-90 was retired without a freighter conversion to extend its service life.

== Design ==
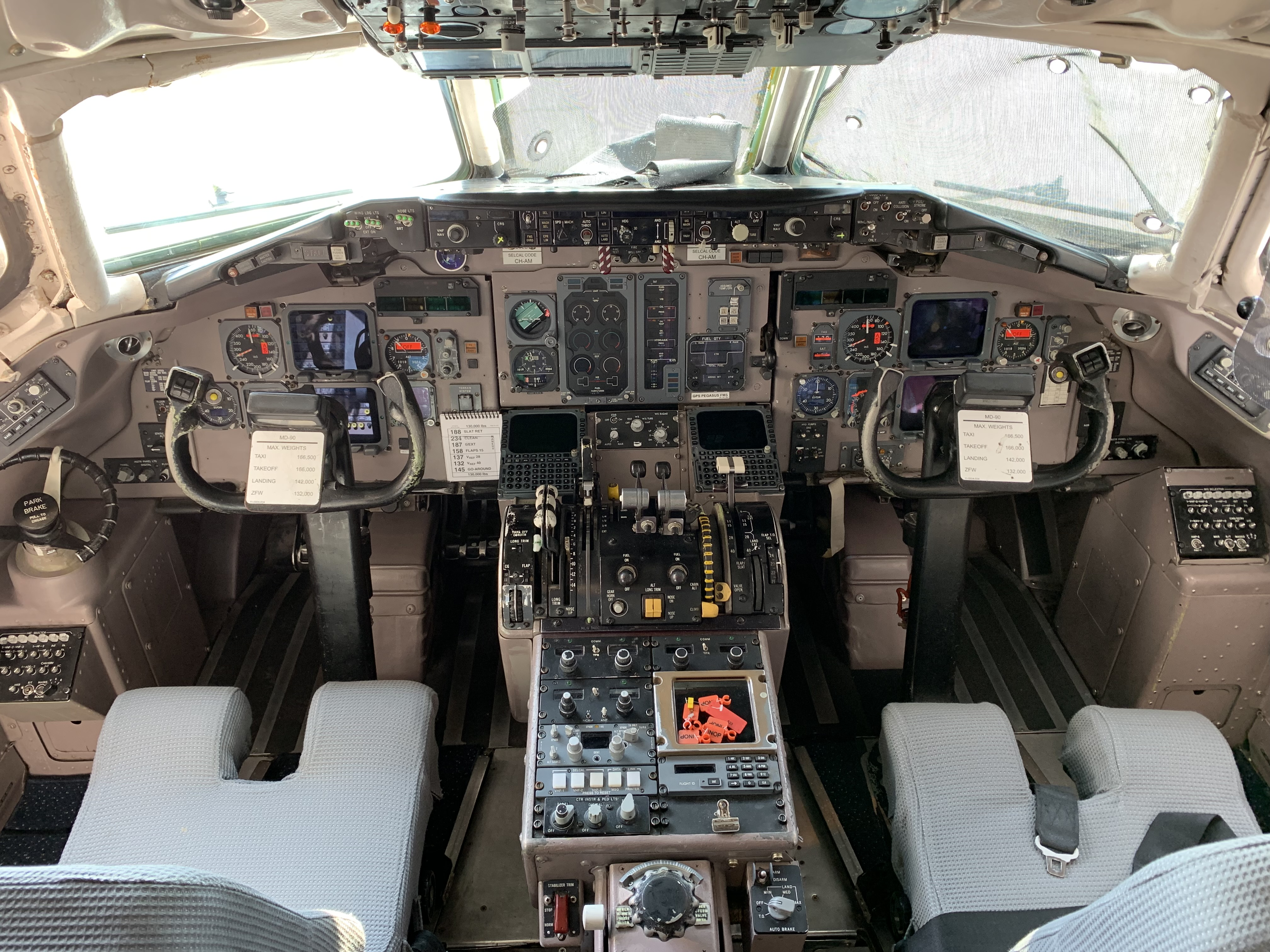
Initial MD-88-style MD-90s EFIS cockpit of Delta Air Lines

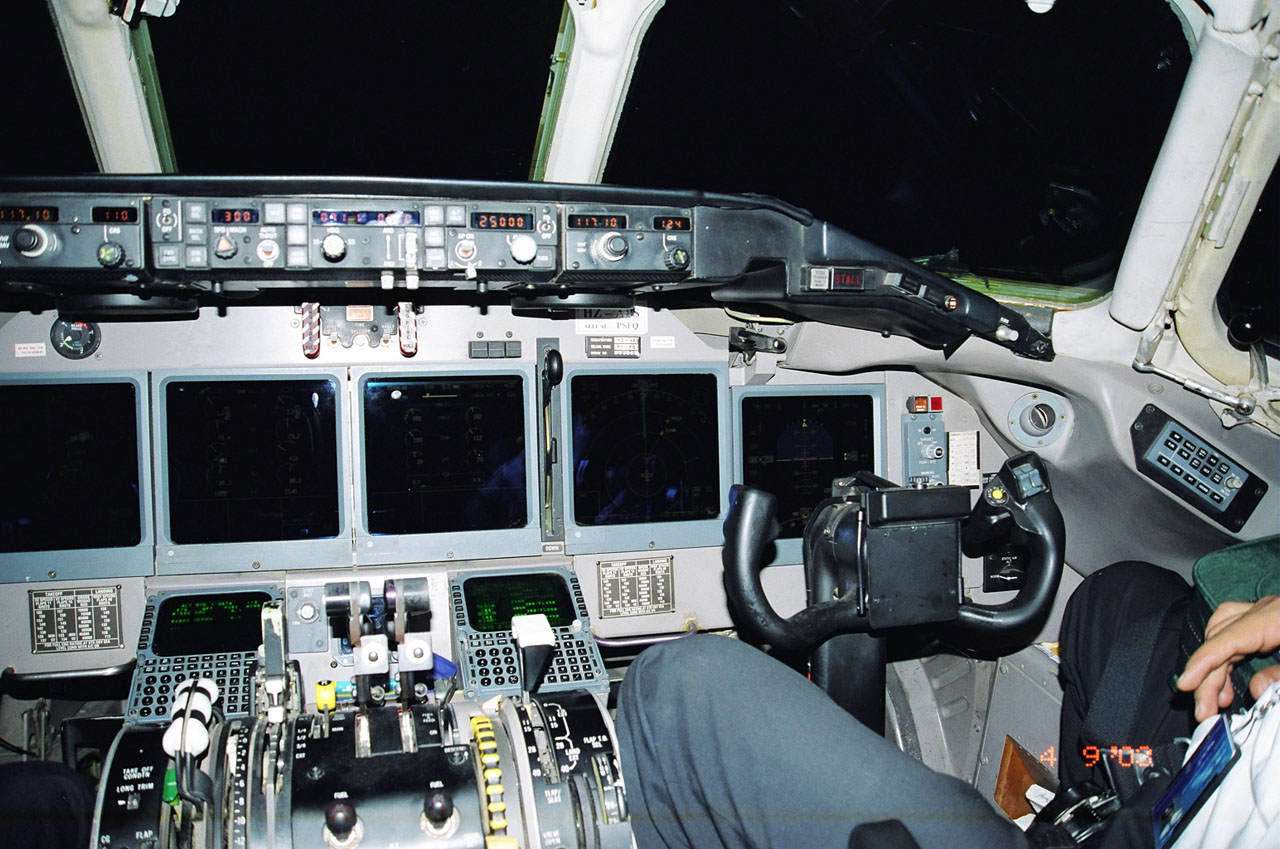
Enhanced MD-90EFD glass cockpit of Saudi Arabian Airlines

The MD-90 is a mid-size, medium-range airliner that was developed from the MD-80 series. Resembling the preliminary version of the MD-88 from March 1984, the MD-90 is a 57-inch-longer (1.4 m), updated version of the base MD-80 with similar electronic flight instrument system (EFIS) and more powerful, quieter and fuel efficient IAE V2500 engines instead of the JT8D engines, which power the MD-80 series. This made the MD-90 the first derivative variant of the DC-9 to use a high-bypass turbofan engine. Due to the heavier engines, the engine pylons feature flaps that deflect 30° downward to assist in pitching down for stall recovery. The system activates automatically when the control column is pushed fully forward.

Typical seating for the MD-90 ranges from 153 to 172 passengers, depending on the cabin configuration and interior layout. The MD-90 was produced in two versions: -30 and −30ER. The −30 has a range of 2,045 nmi (3,787 km; 2,353 mi). The −30ER has a higher gross weight and range up to 2,455 nmi (4,547 km; 2,825 mi) with an extra 565 US gal (2,140 L) auxiliary fuel tank. An even longer-range version, the −50, was offered but was never ordered.

The initial MD-90s feature an EFIS cockpit similar to the MD-88's cockpit. The 29 MD-90s delivered to Saudi Arabian Airlines feature a full glass cockpit with avionics and an overhead display panel similar to the MD-11's cockpit for easy transition for the airline's pilots of the MD-11, also operated by the airline.

== Variants ==
=== Production variants ===
MD-90-30
Base variant with two V2525-D5 or V2528-D5 engines and an EFIS cockpit similar to that of the MD-88. An option was offered to equip cockpit selection between 25K or 28K ratings. Aircraft with this option were fixed at 25K or 28K ratings.
MD-90-30IGW
Increased Gross Weight version, one built.
MD-90-30ER
Extended Range (ER) version of MD-90-30, two built.
MD-90-30T "Trunkliner"
Variant of the MD-90-30 assembled by Shanghai Aviation Industrial Corporation in the People's Republic of China. Production was initially planned to be 40, later reduced to 20, with only two built in the end. To accommodate the heavy aircraft on unsuitable runways, a dual tandem landing gear with more tires to spread the weight of the aircraft was designed for the Trunkliner, but ultimately not used in the two aircraft produced. The Comac ARJ21 is built using tooling retained by the Chinese after the end of the Chinese MD-90-30 program.
MD-90-30EFD
Enhanced Flight Deck version of MD-90 with similar instrumentation to the MD-11, 29 built, all but one scrapped in 2013. One remains preserved for training purposes in unknown condition.

=== Proposed variants ===
MD-90-10
A shorter variant with the same length as the MD-87, carrying from 114 passengers in a three-class layout to 139 passengers in a high-density configuration. It has a maximum takeoff weight (MTOW) of 69.49 short tons (63.04 t; 138,980 lb; 63,040 kg) and a range of 2,410 nmi (2,780 mi; 4,470 km) with fuel reserves. Engine thrust would be 22,000 lbf (99 kN). This variant was not built.
MD-90-10EC
Unbuilt "European Community" version of the MD-90-10, with a higher MTOW and the engine thrust raised to MD-90-30 levels for an increased range of 3,000 nmi (3,450 mi; 5,550 km).
MD-90-20
Proposed re-engining of MD-80 series aircraft to V2500 engines.

MD-90-30EC
Unbuilt "European Community" version of the MD-90-30, with a higher MTOW and the engine thrust raised to MD-90-40 levels for an increased range of 2,800 nmi (3,220 mi; 5,180 km).
MD-90-40
A proposed 172 ft long (52.3 m) variant with a maximum capacity of up to 217 passengers, though the normal three-class layout would hold 170–180 passengers. The derivative would have a storage capacity of 1,610 cu ft (45.6 m^{3}), a maximum takeoff weight of 81.74 short tons (74.15 t; 163,470 lb; 74,150 kg), and a height of 31 ft (9.4 m). Engine thrust would be 28,000 lbf (126 kN). This variant was never built.
MD-90-40EC
Unbuilt "European Community" version of the MD-90-40, with a higher MTOW for an increased range of 1,910 nmi (2,190 mi; 3,530 km). Other improvements include wing area enlargement/strengthening, one-person baggage loading improvements, and better interiors.
MD-90-50ER
A proposed variant similar to the MD-90-30, but with two extra auxiliary fuel tanks mounted on the belly. The aircraft had an MTOW of 86.3 short tons (78.2 t; 172,500 lb; 78,200 kg), used IAE V2528 engines with 28,000 lbf (120 kN) thrust, and had an estimated range of 3,022 nmi (3,478 mi; 5,597 km).
MD-90-55
A proposed variant with two extra passenger doors and room for 187 passengers in a single-class configuration.

== Operators ==
There are no longer any MD-90 aircraft in service as Delta Air Lines was the last remaining operator in 2020. They began phasing out its MD-90s in 2017, before retiring its remaining MD-90s after their final flights on June 2, 2020.

=== Deliveries ===
Deliveries
Type	Total	2000	1999	1998	1997	1996	1995
MD-90-30	113	3	13	34	25	25	13
MD-90-30ER	1				1		
MD-90-30T	2	2					
MD-90 series	116	5	13	34	26	25	13

== Accidents and incidents ==
During its service life, the MD-90 was involved in three hull-loss accidents, resulting in one fatality.

- On August 24, 1999, Uni Air Flight 873, an MD-90, caught fire after a passenger's carry-on luggage containing gasoline was ignited by a motorcycle battery contained in another passenger's carry-on luggage. 27 people were injured with one fatality as a result of the cabin fire. The aircraft was damaged beyond economic repair.
- On February 23, 2009, a Lion Air MD-90 with 156 passengers and 6 crew members, performing flight JT-972 from Medan to Batam in Indonesia, could not extend the nose gear while on approach to runway 04 of Batam's Hang Nadim Airport. The crew aborted the approach and circled the airport while trying to troubleshoot the problem. After around one hour, they were forced to land without the nose gear at around 18:30 local time (11:30 GMT). The airport's emergency services had sprayed foam on the runway for the landing, which the crew performed safely.
- On March 9, 2009, a Lion Air MD-90 overran runway 25L at Soekarno–Hatta International Airport, due to an unstable approach 330 ft (100 m) before the runway in rainfall and strong winds, in which the aircraft touched down to the left of the centerline. Although its thrust reversers were functioning, it veered to the right, resulting in the aircraft resting 90 degrees off the runway.
- On May 8, 2009, a Saudi Arabian Airlines MD-90EFD with seven crew members and no passengers on a repositioning flight from Jeddah was substantially damaged during a runway excursion at Riyadh airport. On touchdown, the captain manually extended the speed brake (spoiler) lever, but did not latch it in the fully extended (EXT) position (fully aft and latched upwards), and the lever automatically returned to the forward retracted (RET) position which was not noticed by the cockpit crew. After touchdown, the aircraft banked to the right and began to drift right of the runway center line and left the runway at high speed, traversed the full width of the G4 taxiway, where the left main landing gear collapsed during this time. The aircraft came to rest on taxiway GOLF and all crew members escaped with no injuries. The aircraft was written off.

== Specifications (MD-90-30) ==
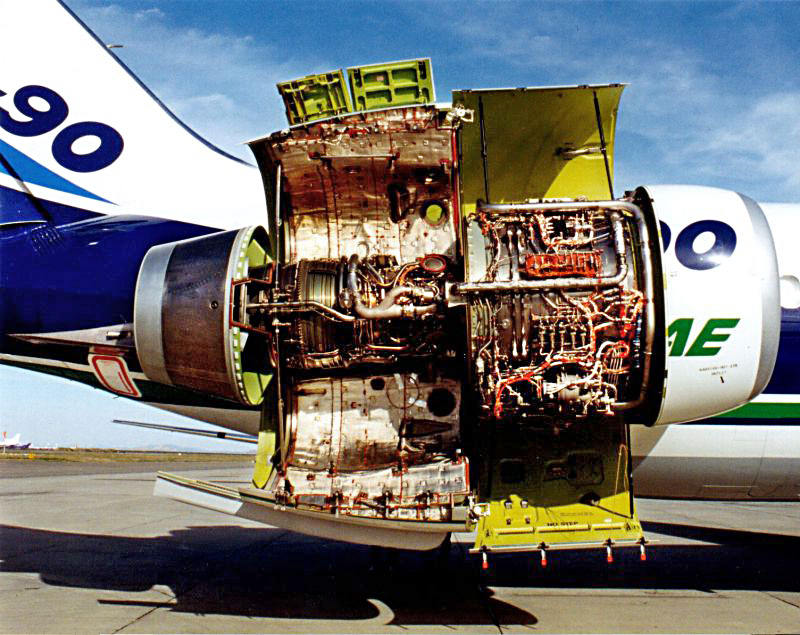
International Aero Engines V2500 engine powering the MD-90

Specifications
Cockpit crew	Two
Seating, 2–class	153–158: 12J@36" + 141/146Y@31-33"
Seating, 1–class	163-172Y@29–33"
Cargo	1,300 cu ft (36.8 m^{3})
Length	152.6 ft (46.51 m)
Fuselage	131.6×142 in (334.3×360.7 cm) width × height
Wingspan	107.8 ft (32.86 m)
Height	30.6 ft (9.33 m)
MTOW	156,000 lb (70,760 kg)
Empty weight	88,200 lb (40,007 kg)
Max. payload	41,800 lb (18,960 kg)
Fuel capacity	39,128 lb (17,748 kg) (Note: with aux fuel tank: 42,913 lb (19,465 kg))
Turbofan engines (2×)	IAE V2525-D5 or V2528-D5
Unit thrust	25,000–28,000 lbf (111.21–124.55 kN)
VMO	Mach 0.84 (501 kn; 928 km/h; 576 mph) at 27,240 ft (8,303 m)
Cruise speed	Mach 0.76 (439 kn; 812 km/h; 505 mph) at 34,777 ft (10,600 m)
Ceiling	37,000 ft (11,278 m)
Range, 153 pax	2,045 nmi (3,787 km; 2,353 mi)
Takeoff runway	7,000 ft (2,134 m) at 156,000 lb, ISA, SL

== See also ==
Related development

- Boeing 717
- Comac ARJ21
- McDonnell Douglas C-9
- McDonnell Douglas DC-9
- McDonnell Douglas MD-80

Aircraft of comparable role, configuration, and era

- Airbus A320 family
- Boeing 737 Next Generation

Related lists

- List of civil aircraft
- List of jet airliners

== Sources ==
- Becher, Thomas. Douglas Twinjets, DC-9, MD-80, MD-90 and Boeing 717. The Crowood Press, 2002. ISBN 1-86126-446-1.
- Swanborough, Gordon. "A 'Ninety for the 'Nineties". Air International, August 1993, Vol 45 No 2. Stamford, UK:Key Publishing. pp. 90–95
- Norris, Guy (June 9–15, 1993). "Smooth operator". Flight International. Photographs by Mark Wagner. Cutaway drawing by John Marsden. pp. 45–48, 50.
