= List of defunct airlines of Taiwan =

This is a list of defunct airlines of Taiwan.

Airline	Image	IATA	ICAO	Callsign	Commenced operations	Ceased operations	Notes
Astro Airlines					1998	2000	
Chian Airlines					1998	1999	
China-Asia Airlines					1989	1994	Rebranded as U-Land Airlines
Civil Air Transport		CT	CAT	MANDARIN	1946	1968	Cargo division turned over to Flying Tiger Line. Passenger division shut down after crash
Dragon Air					1947	1952	
Far Eastern Air Transport		FE	FEA	FAR EASTERN	1957	2019	Ceased operations from 2008 to 2011
Formosa Airlines		VY	FOS		1987	1999	Merged into Mandarin Airlines
Foshing Airlines		GE	FHA		1951	1992	Regional domestic scheduled passenger airline. Rebranded as TransAsia Airways
Golden Eagle Air Transport					1993	2003	Performed target tugging for the ROCAF.
Great China Airlines		IF	GCA		1966	1998	Merged into Uni Air
Imperial Japanese Airways					1938	1945	Part of Japan.
Japan Air Transport					1928	1938	Merged into Imperial Japanese Airways. Part of Japan.
Makung Airlines		GS;B7	MKO		1988	1994	Renamed Makung International Airlines
Makung International Airlines		B7			1994	1996	Renamed Uni Air
SunRise Airlines					1992	2021	
Taiwan Airlines		WG			1976	1997	Renamed/merged to Taiwan Airways
Taiwan Airways (Company)		WG			1990s	1998	Merged into Uni Air
TransAsia Airways		GE	TNA	TRANSASIA	1992	2016	Went bankrupt
U-Land Airlines		WI			1994	2000	Went bankrupt
UOB Airlines					1966	1998	Merged into Uni Air
V Air		ZV	VAX	VANTAGE	2014	2016	Integrated back into TransAsia Airways
Winner Airways	Winner_Airways_Lockheed_L-188_Electra_B-3057_at_Oakland_prior_to_delivery_to_Taiwan_in_the_late_1960s				1966	1973	
Yung Shing Airlines					1966	1987	Rebranded as Formosa Airlines
Yung Shing Air Transport					1968	1968	Helicopter Operator

== See also ==
- List of airlines of Taiwan
- List of airports in Taiwan
