= 1994 Han Kuang 11 exercise shootdown incident =

Aviation shootdown accident, Taiwan

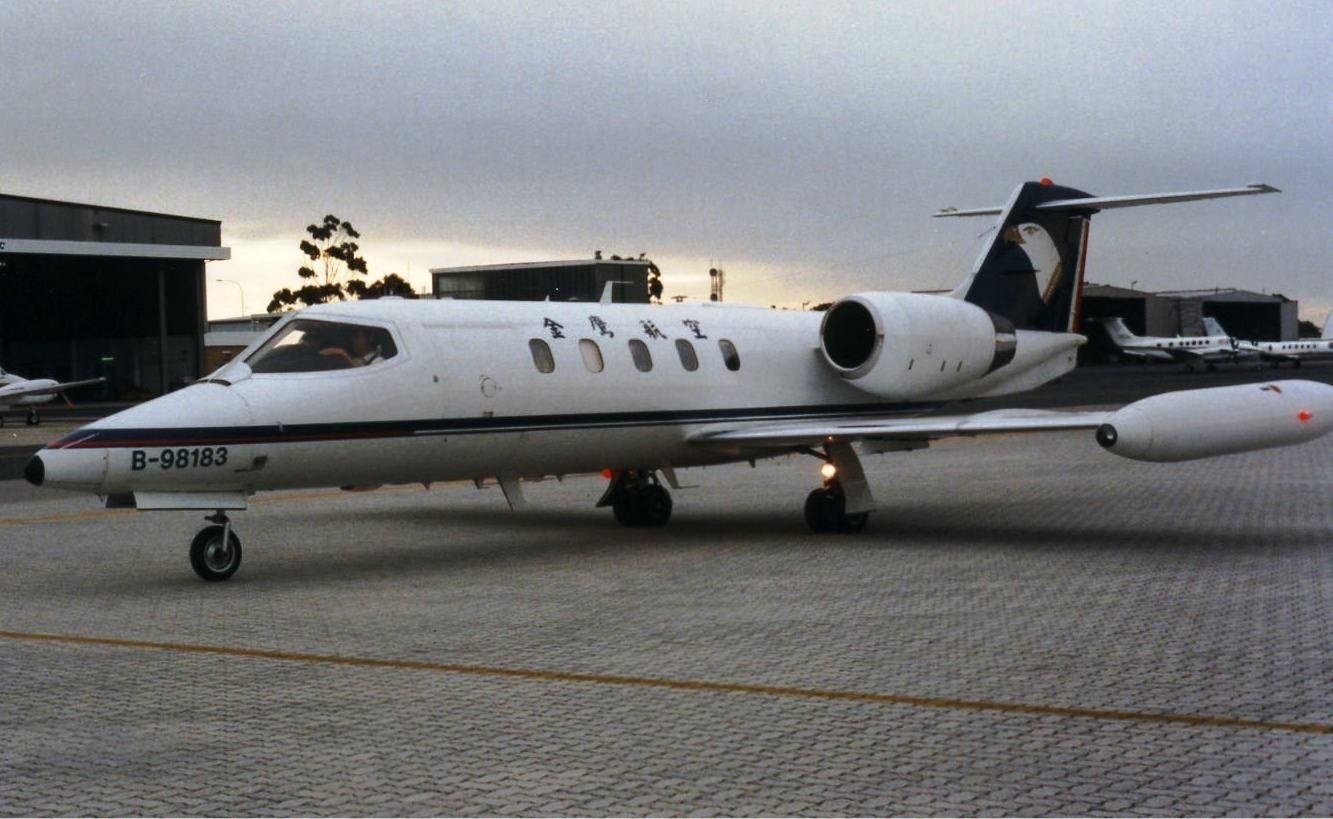
- Target tug of the same type, also operated by Golden Eagle Air Transport

Shootdown
- Date: 17 September 1994
- Summary: ROCN Cheng Kung mistakenly shot down a target tug during exercise, killing all 4 on board
- Site: Off the coast of Taiwan Taitung County

Aircraft
- Aircraft type: Learjet 35A
- Operator: Golden Eagle Air Transport
- Registration: B-98181
- Flight origin: Taiwan Tainan Airport
- Crew: 4
- Fatalities: 4
- Survivors: 0

1994 Han Kuang 11 exercise shootdown incident occurred on September 17, 1994, 14:02 (GMT +8) off the coast of Zhiben, Taitung, Taiwan during the second rehearsal for Han Kuang 11 exercise. Golden Eagle Air Transport, a military contractor, provided target tug operation with a Learjet 35A, but was unexpectedly shot down by Phalanx CIWS on the frigate ROCN Cheng Kung, killing all 4 civilians on board. Later investigation led to a series of human error by the ROC Navy.

External image
- B-98181 before the incident

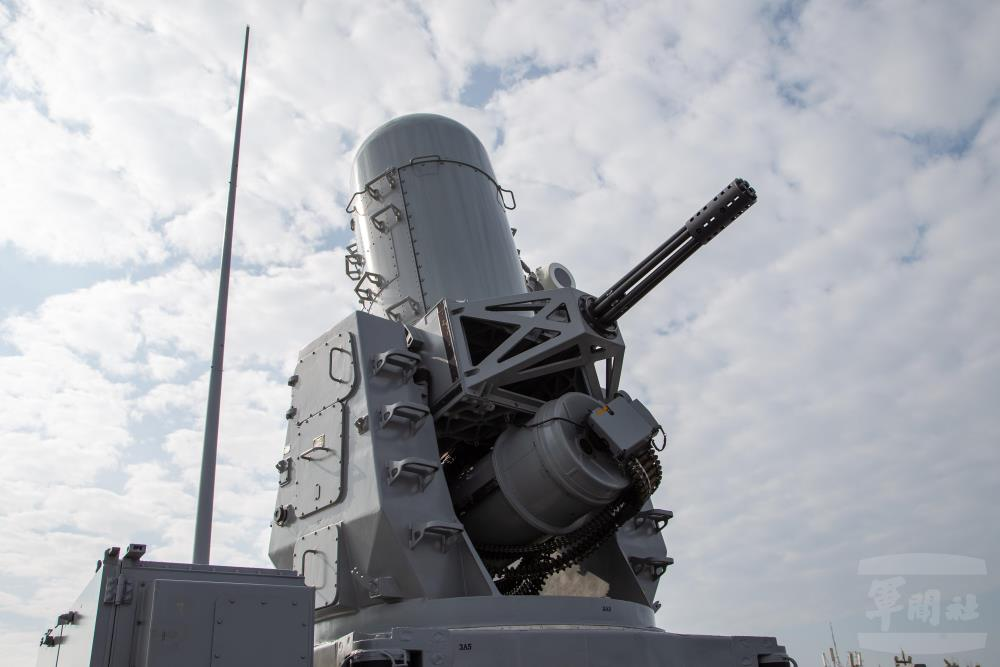
CIWS on another frigate of the same class in ROCN.

== Background ==
=== Victims ===
All four members on board the Learjet were killed, including:

- Pilot and the vice president of the company, Chen, Chien-Fu (Chinese: 陳乾福);
- Co-pilot, Huang, Huan-Chi (Chinese: 黃煥基);
- Flight engineer, Zhang, Kang (Chinese: 張康);
- Observer, Yang, Dai-Kun (Chinese: 楊代鯤).

=== Golden Eagle Air Transport ===
Golden Eagle Air Transport Co., Ltd. (Chinese: 金鷹航空股份有限公司) was a military contractor established by a small group of veterans of ROC Air Force in February 1993, with their main focus being providing target tug operations. They signed a contract with ROC Armed Forces Combined Logistics Command in December 1993, and they have leased one aircraft for target tug from China Leasing Co., Ltd. (Chinese: 中國租賃公司, now Chailease Finance Co., Ltd). The aircraft was a Learjet 35A (registration B-98181, serial number 35-675) manufactured in 1993, stationed in a hangar in Tainan Airport maintained by Taiwan's Air Asia Co., Ltd.

After the incident, they procured another Learjet 35A (registration B-98183, serial number 35-654) to continue on their target tug operation. This aircraft was later sold and struck off of Taiwan registration on June 4, 2002, not long before the company ceased their operations and dissolved in January 2003. This Learjet was later sold to a German defense contractor GFD Gesellschaft für Flugzieldarstellung (Company for Aerial Target Presentation, LLC) in December 2014 under German registration D-CGFN. This contractor is now a subsidiary of Airbus Defense and Space, and specifically uses Learjets for target tug operations.

=== ROCS Cheng Kung ===
The first ship in her class, ROCS Cheng Kung (Chinese: 成功艦; lit. 'Success'), a modified version of United States' Oliver Hazard Perry-class frigate, were newly built by the ROC Navy under the codename Project Kuang Hua 1 (Chinese: 光華一號計畫; lit. 'Glorify the China Project No. 1'). At the time of the incident, this ship had just entered service for merely one year. As a recent addition to the ROC Navy and the first capital ship built in Taiwan, the ship's sailors endured much pressure and had to go on missions way longer than other navy vessels.

== Incident ==
On the afternoon of September 17, 1994, the drill for naval weapon systems antimissile shooting (Chinese: 艦載武器反飛彈射擊) commenced off the coast of Zhiben, Taitung County (Chinese: 台東知本). The target tug arrived on local time 13:39 and received order from the ASW officer on ROCN Cheng Kung to head for the standby area. The target tug would wait for the RIM-72C Sea Chaparral onboard ROCN Kwei Yang (Chinese: 貴陽艦) to conduct live fire exercise before it flew NNW towards ROCN Cheng Kung, which was heading SW off the estuary of Zhiben River (Chinese: 知本溪). The target tug approached the frigate on the port side, bearing 280, with the altitude of 1200 feet and the speed of 250 knots, and the target drone altitude 298 feet.

The Phalanx CIWS was expected to open fire only after the target tug flew past ROCN Cheng Kung and entered the safe zone. However, at local time 14:02, the Learjet proceeds to the designated route with a delay of around 20 seconds. Instead of waiting for the Learjet to flew past the frigate, the CIWS unexpectedly opened fire when the target tug still had a distance of 3.9 seconds. The Learjet was fatally struck, causing it to explode in midair and crashed into the Pacific Ocean.

The military postponed search and rescue efforts until the rehearsal has concluded. Ships in the area, including 14 missile boats and 12 frigates, recovered all four bodies with parts of the Learjet's wreckage. Military prosecutors performed autopsy and the wreckage was sent to the military for investigation. Taiwan's Civil Aviation Administration (CAA) also sent an investigation team by helicopter the next day, however as the military had refused to work with them, things did not went further.

== Investigation ==
Under immense pressure from Taiwan's congress, Legislative Yuan, Taiwan's Ministry of National Defense (MND) established September 17 Incident Investigation Team (Chinese: 九一七專案小組), led by the deputy director of MND Inspector General's Office Lieutenant General Lin, Suo-Li (Chinese: 林所里) and ROC Air Force General Headquarters. The team reported directly to MND and Legislative Yuan, and superseded the Navy General Headquarters. Investigation revealed that the incident was caused by a series of human errors.

=== Understaffed frigate ===
The frigate ROCN Cheng Kung was the flagship of the exercise task force, but due to understaff, many sailors related to the CIWS operation were removed from their role or severely affected:

- One spotter was supposed to visually confirm the target tug on the deck of the frigate, but the captain did not assign this role. This was considered the most significant error by the investigation report.
- The frigate's Tactical Action Officer (TAO) was supposed to also look out for the position of the target tug. However, the officer had been assigned additional tasks related to the communcation between the Combat Information Center (CIC) and the Command Deck, and the TAO simply could not track the target tug at the same time.
- The Missile Officer was supposed to locate the target on the CIWS' radar before open fire, but he was assigned to the Command Deck during the exercise to assist on navigation of the frigate instead.

=== Communication error ===
The standard communication protocol dictated that the target tug pilot would report On top. Cleared to fire. before the Air Traffic Controller (ATC) on the frigate responded with Cleared to fire., and only then were the weapon systems allowed to engage and open fire. However the radio transcript revealed their disregard in the standard protocol. One day prior to the exercise, the ATC first radioed Ready., and the target tug responded with On top., with the ATC responded On top. before the frigate engage the weapon systems. During the exercise, the ATC radioed Prepare on top. The target tug, despite not being in a safe zone, replied OK, ready. The Weapon System Officer (WSO) misunderstood the reply and engaged the CIWS.

=== Fear for not being able to react in time ===
- A regular target tug protocol required a target drone cable length of 13,000 to 15,000 feet, with the target tug altitude of 900 to 1,200 feet. This is the optimal setting that the target drone would be at around 300 feet in altitude. In this exercise, however, mountains exceed 2,700 feet in height were only 6,000 yards from the coast line. Golden Eagle Air Transport therefore shortened the cable length to 10,000 feet to allow for their target tug to escape in time. Previous drills performed by them and the frigate deemed feasible, but the sailors of ROCN Cheng Kung had less than standard time to react if things went south.
- The Captain of ROCN Cheng Kung further ordered the anti-air weapon systems set to automatic engage, due to the concern of not being able to open fire in time.

=== Violation of firing protocol ===
- The automatic engage setting forcifully skipped important safety measurements.
- Sailors did noy employ the remote control panel in CIC, and as a consequence, the Captain cannot use the Disengage button on the panel to disengage the weapon systems.
- WSO ordered to only report the track for the target drone, and not to report the target tug. As a result, the WSO cannot be certain if the CIWS had locked on the correct target.

== Reactions ==
=== Critics on the search and rescue efforts ===
- During the exercise, the military invited 3,000 civilians to participate on the beach for the live fire exercise. As the incident occurred, the master of ceremony only concluded that this exercise has been cancelled, with no details provided, and the exercise went on like nothing happened. At the same time, Navy officers inquired the headquarters for abortion of the exercise. The headquarters responded that the show must go on.
- Reporters rushed to the beach at 20:30 on the day of incident, and the beach was completely quite with no efforts of search and rescue could be seen. Some military personnel told the reporters they knew nothing about any search and rescue, and some of them were even unaware of the incident.
- The military did not report the police about the incident. The responsible police department, Taitung County Police, inquired about the incident and providing assistance for search and rescue after they knew the incident occurred, but the military rejected them outright.

=== Critics on the exercise ===
- Editorials criticized that CIWS was designed to shoot down an incoming missile, and a target drone would not simulate a missile in altitude or speed. Therefore, this exercise did nothing in proving the CIWS's usefulness.
- Taiwanese Legislator Zhao, Zheng-Peng (Chinese: 趙振鵬), an ex-Army Major General, told the media that this "naval gun air-defense firing" drill was planned to demonstrate with naval artilleries like 5-inch guns, 7-inch guns, 76mm guns, or 40mm guns. But the military hastily changed to the CIWS only three days prior to the exercise, for the sake of "achieving the stunning effect of shooting down the target drone in a single shot".

=== Relatives of the victim ===
The son of the target tug's pilot accused the military that they rejected search and rescue for the sake of exercise; it was Golden Eagle Air Transport who assembled a private search and rescue team to recover the victims' remains. He also accused Gu, Shang-Chih (Chinese: 顧尚智) on board ROCN Cheng Kung as WSO, being a relative of then Navy Commander-in-chief Gu Chung-Lian (Chinese: 顧崇廉), scolded the victims' relatives that Three million TWD is all you'll get. Take it or leave it. Gu was still promoted to the rank of Captain after this incident, seemingly not affected at all. He said that the innocent frigate captain, Captain Zhao, Chung-Hsin (Chinese: 趙中行) took all the blame and was discharged with dishonor.

=== Court judgment ===
- Taiwan Fire & Marine Insurance Co., Ltd. reimbursed both companies, Golden Eagle Air Transport and China Leasing Co., Ltd., TWD$170,846,591 for the loss of aircraft, and demanded compensation in the same amount from the military. In 1995, Taiwan Taipei District Court ruled in favor of the insurance company that Taiwan's Navy General Headquarters and MND Procurements Bureau had to compensate the very same amount, at the time the greatest amount awarded under State Compensation Law.
- Three officers of ROCN Cheng Kung, Captain Zhao, Chung-Hsin (Chinese: 趙中行), WSO Gu, Shang-Chih (Chinese: 顧尚智), and TAO, were court-martialled but were given probation. Fleet Commander of ROC Navy 124 Fleet, Rear-Admiral Jing, Feng-Shian (Chinese: 金豐鄉) was also punished.
- The son and daughter of the target tug's pilot, Chen, Chien-Fu, rejected their pension TWD$600,000 offered by the military as a protest. Other relatives of Chen received a total of TWD$2,400,000 in pension given by the military.

=== Censure by Control Yuan ===
On March 23, 1995, Control Yuan issued a censure that condemns the gross negligence of the military, citing several crucial points that the military failed to comply. The translated censure text goes:

ROCN Cheng Kung failed to comply with standard operating procedure and violated firing safety protocols, resulted in the Phalanx CIWS locked on to the target tug by synchronous tracking and aiming of the CIWS cannon and fire control radar, with live annunition chambered and ready to fire. Furthermore, the frigate failed to employ remote control panel to effectively enforce the cease fire procedures. The exercise personnel disregarded the weapon system's automatic functions and resorted to manual control, which is a highly improper act. Additionally, on the day of exercise, the CIWS radar detection range was increased by the original manufacturer's technical consultant at the Navy's request. This act of arbitrarily altering weapon functions and the complete disregard of technical orders ultimately culminated in a catastrophic disaster. Therefore, a censure must be issued.

== Similar incidents ==
- In the 1980s, a ROCAF F-5E Tiger II conducting target tug mission was accidentally shot down by another fighter, resulted in the loss of both the F-5E and the pilot. The details for this incident was not released to the public.
- On June 4, 1996, during RIMPAC 96, a US Navy A-6E Intruder from USS Independence providing target tug service was shot down in a live-fire CIWS exercise by the Phalanx CIWS on the JMSDF destroyer JS Yūgiri. Two pilots ejected and were promptly rescued by JS Yūgiri. This is the first time since the end of World War II that a US plane was shot down by the Japanese.
