= TransAsia Airways Flight 791 =

2002 aviation accident

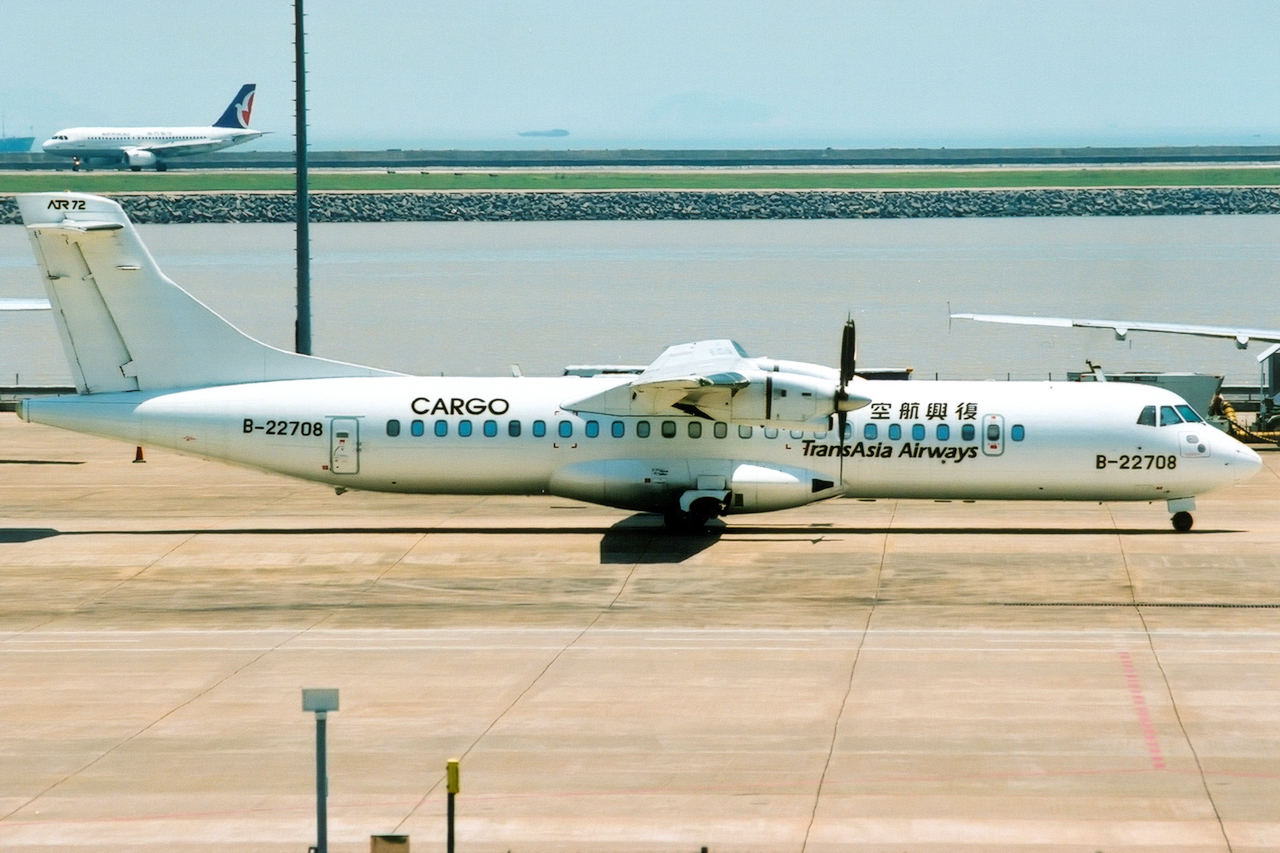
- B-22708, the ATR 72-202 involved, photographed in August 2002

Accident
- Date: 21 December 2002
- Summary: Atmospheric icing leading to loss of control
- Site: 17 kilometres (11 mi; 9.2 nmi) southwest of Magong, Penghu, Taiwan

Aircraft
- Aircraft type: ATR 72-202
- Operator: TransAsia Airways
- IATA flight No.: GE791
- ICAO flight No.: TNA791
- Call sign: TRANSASIA 791
- Registration: B-22708
- Flight origin: Chiang Kai Shek International Airport (now Taoyuan International Airport), Taipei, Taiwan
- Destination: Macau International Airport, Macau
- Occupants: 2
- Passengers: 0
- Crew: 2
- Fatalities: 2
- Survivors: 0

TransAsia Airways Flight 791 was a regular cargo flight between Chiang Kai Shek International Airport (now Taiwan Taoyuan International Airport) and Macau International Airport. At 01:52 am local time on 21 December 2002, the ATR 72 operating the flight crashed into the sea 17 kilometres (11 mi; 9.2 nmi) southwest of Magong, Penghu, Taiwan. The two crew members on board were killed.

== Accident ==
Flight GE791 was operated using an ATR 72-200 freighter. The captain and first officer were the only occupants of the aircraft. The flight was from Chiang Kai Shek International Airport (now Taoyuan International Airport) to Macau International Airport.

Flight 791 departed from Taoyuan at 1:04 am local time (17:04 UTC). At 1:51 am, the first officer requested permission from Air Traffic Control (ATC) to descend from flight level (FL) 180 (18,000 feet (5,500 m)) to FL160 (16,000 feet (4,900 m)). The controller approved the request and the first officer acknowledged. However, the aircraft began a rapid descent and disappeared from the radar screens one minute later, at 01:52 am. The last known position of the aircraft was about 17 kilometres (11 mi; 9.2 nmi) southwest of Magong, Penghu.

At 03:05 am, the Civil Aeronautics Administration of the Ministry of Communications of Taiwan declared an emergency and dispatched helicopters and boats of the Air Force, Navy and Coast Guard Administration to search for Flight 791.

At 08:05 one of the rescue boats found the first pieces of debris and subsequently confirmed that Flight 791 had crashed. It is not known if the bodies of the flight crew were recovered. The captain was presumed dead by a court.

== Aircraft and crew ==
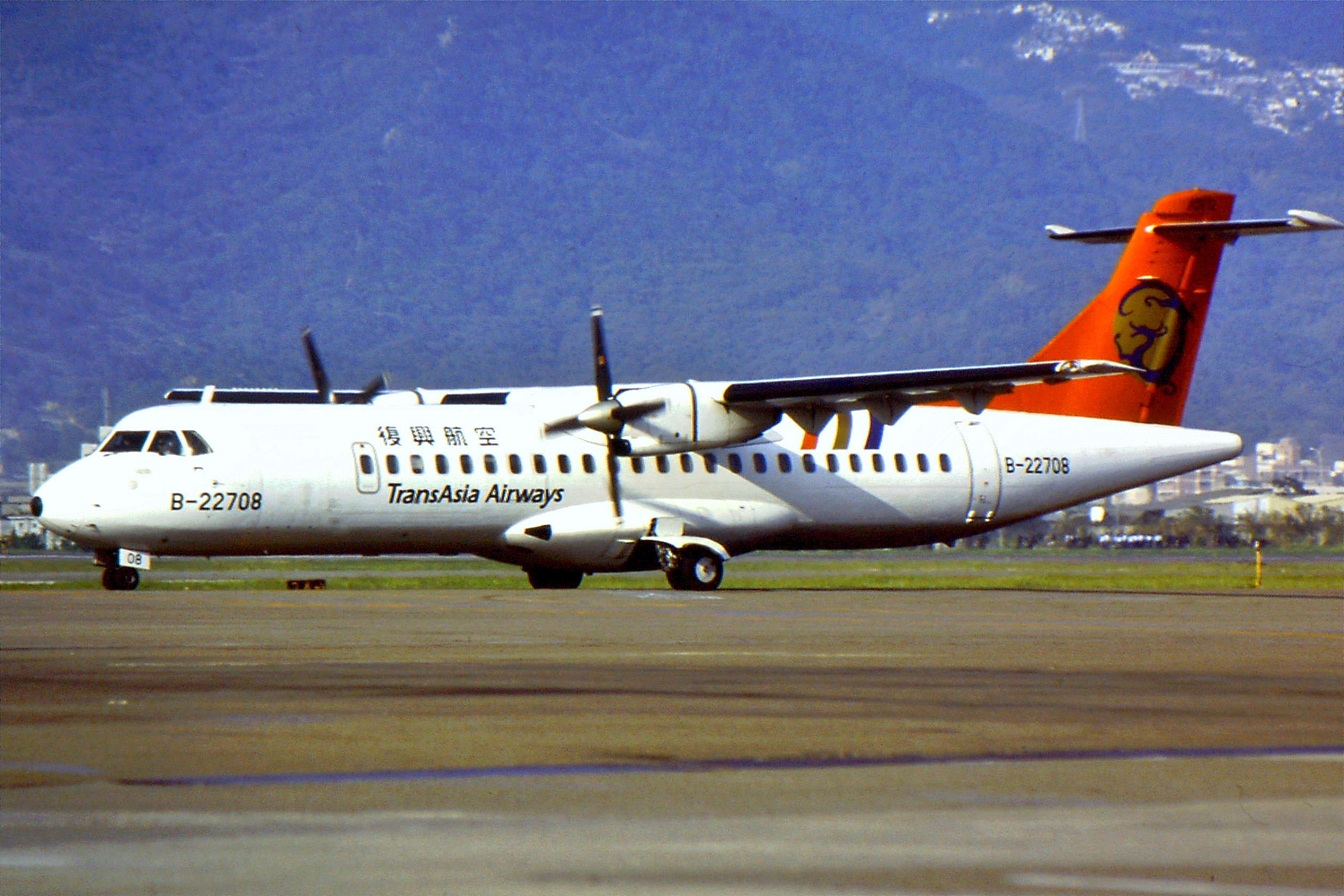
The aircraft involved in the accident in October 1994 at Taipei Songshan Airport while still as a passenger aircraft.

The aircraft involved was an ATR 72-200, registration B-22708. It entered service as a passenger aircraft with TransAsia Airways on 25 August 1992. In February 2002 the aircraft was converted to a freighter. At the time of the accident, the aircraft had 19,254 hours, and 25,529 takeoff and landing cycles. The aircraft was powered by two Pratt and Whitney PW124B engines.

Captain Pan Teh-chung, aged 53, had been with TransAsia Airways since 1991. He had 14,277 hours of flight experience, including 10,608 hours on the ATR 42/72. First Officer Liu Ching-hai, aged 34, had been with TransAsia Airways since 1997 and had logged 4,578 flight hours, with 4,271 of them on the ATR 42/72.

== Investigation ==
Taiwan's Aviation Safety Council (now the Taiwan Transportation Safety Board) investigated the accident. The ASC reviewed the flight crew's training records. During recurrent training, the captain had "satisfactory" scores in icing conditions, however the instructor noted that the captain had a "tendency to lose situational awareness". According to his instructor, the captain repeated the training, and his results improved. Despite this, the instructor said that the captain was "still unsteady." There were no issues reported during the first officer's training.

=== Salvage and recovery ===
The majority of the wreckage was found 180 metres (590 ft) away from where Flight 791 last made contact with ATC. On 9 January 2003, the ASC commenced a salvage operation assisted by the coast guard administration and TransAsia Airways staff. The first salvage operation was performed on 10 January, after being delayed due to weather. The flight data recorder (FDR) was recovered on 11 January, and the cockpit voice recorder (CVR) was recovered on 14 January.

=== Examination of wreckage ===
Investigators discovered ice accumulation around the aircraft's major components. The aircraft's de-icing system was examined as well.

=== Analysis of the flight recorders ===
The CVR recorded a large amount of non-pertinent conversation. The first indication of any problem occurred at 1:34 am, when a "single chime" caution was heard. The captain then explained about how ice was accumulating on the aircraft at 1:44. The captain then brought this up a second time at 1:50. The crew then requested their descent. A short non-pertinent conversation was then heard, after which several alarms sounded until the end of the recording.

The FDR indicated that the autopilot was disengaged at the moment of impact. The anti-ice system had been activated twice. The first was from 1:34 to 1:37, and the second was from 1:41 until the accident.

=== Sequence of events based on recorder analysis ===
Flight 791 was normal until 1:34 am with the "single chime" alert going off. At 1:44 the captain said, "It’s iced up quite a huge chunk," and then four minutes later shouted, "Wow it’s a huge chunk," to which the first officer responded "what an ice," followed by, "this speed is getting slower it was a hundred two hundred one hundred and ninety now one hundred seventy." The captain expressed concern to the first officer about the pitot-static system getting blocked but he did not express the concern of the aircraft stalling. He also requested that they should descend as a precaution. After the first officer requested and obtained clearance to descend by ATC, the captain again said that there was ice accumulating on the aircraft. The stick shaker then activated, followed by the aural stall warning. The autopilot was disengaged in an attempt to recover the aircraft, which had entered an aerodynamic stall. The attempt was unsuccessful and the aircraft rapidly lost altitude and crashed into the Ocean, killing the crew.

=== Conclusion ===
The Aviation Safety Council released its final report on 25 October 2003. The report determined that the flight crew had lacked situational awareness and thus did not respond to the severe icing conditions.

Findings related to probable causes:

1. The accident flight encountered severe icing conditions. The liquid water content and maximum droplet size were beyond the icing certification envelope of FAR/JAR 25 [located in] Appendix C.
2. TNA's training and rating of aircraft severe icing for this pilots has not been effective and the pilots have not developed a familiarity with the note, CAUTION and WARNING set forth in Flight Crew Operating Manual and Airplane Flight Manual to adequately perform their duties.
3. After the flight crew detected icing condition and the airframe de-icing system was activated twice, the flight crew did not read the relative handbook, thereby the procedure was not able to inform the flight crew and to remind them of "be alert to severe icing detection".
4. The "unexpected decrease in speed" indicated by the airspeed indicator is an indication of severe icing [conditions encountered by the aircraft].
5. The flight crew did not respond to the severe Icing conditions with pertinent alertness and situation[al] awareness that the aircraft might have encountered conditions which was "outside that for which the aircraft was certificated and might seriously degrade the performance and controllability of the aircraft".
6. The flight crew was too late in detecting the severe icing conditions. After detection, they did not change altitude immediately, nor take other steps required in the Severe Icing Emergency Procedures.
7. The aircraft was in an "unusual or uncontrolled rolling and pitching" state, and a stall occurred thereafter.
8. After the aircraft had developed a stall and an abnormal attitude, the recovery maneuvering did not comply with the operating procedures and techniques for Recovery of Unusual Attitudes. The performance and controllability of the aircraft may have been seriously degraded by then. It cannot be confirmed whether [or not] the unusual attitudes of the aircraft could have been recovered if the crew's operation had complied with the relevant procedures and techniques.
9. During the first 25 minutes, the extra drag increased about 100 counts, inducing a speed diminishing about 10 knots.
10. During the [time that the] airframe de-icing system was intermittently switched off, it is highly probable that residual ice [accumulated and] covered on the wings of the aircraft.
11. Four minutes prior to [the] autopilot [being] disengaged, the extra drag increased about 500 counts, and [the] airspeed decayed to 158 knots, and lift-drag ratio loss about 64% rapidly.
12. During the 10s [seconds] before the roll upset, the longitudinal and lateral stability [of the aircraft] has been modified by the severe ice accumulated on the wings producing the flow separation. Before [the] autopilot disengaged, the aerodynamic of the aircraft (lift/drag) was degraded of about 40%.

— ASC final report

== See also ==
- American Eagle Flight 4184 - another ATR 72 that crashed after a loss of control due to atmospheric icing.
