= JS Yūdachi (DD-103) =

Destroyer of the Japan Maritime Self-Defense Force

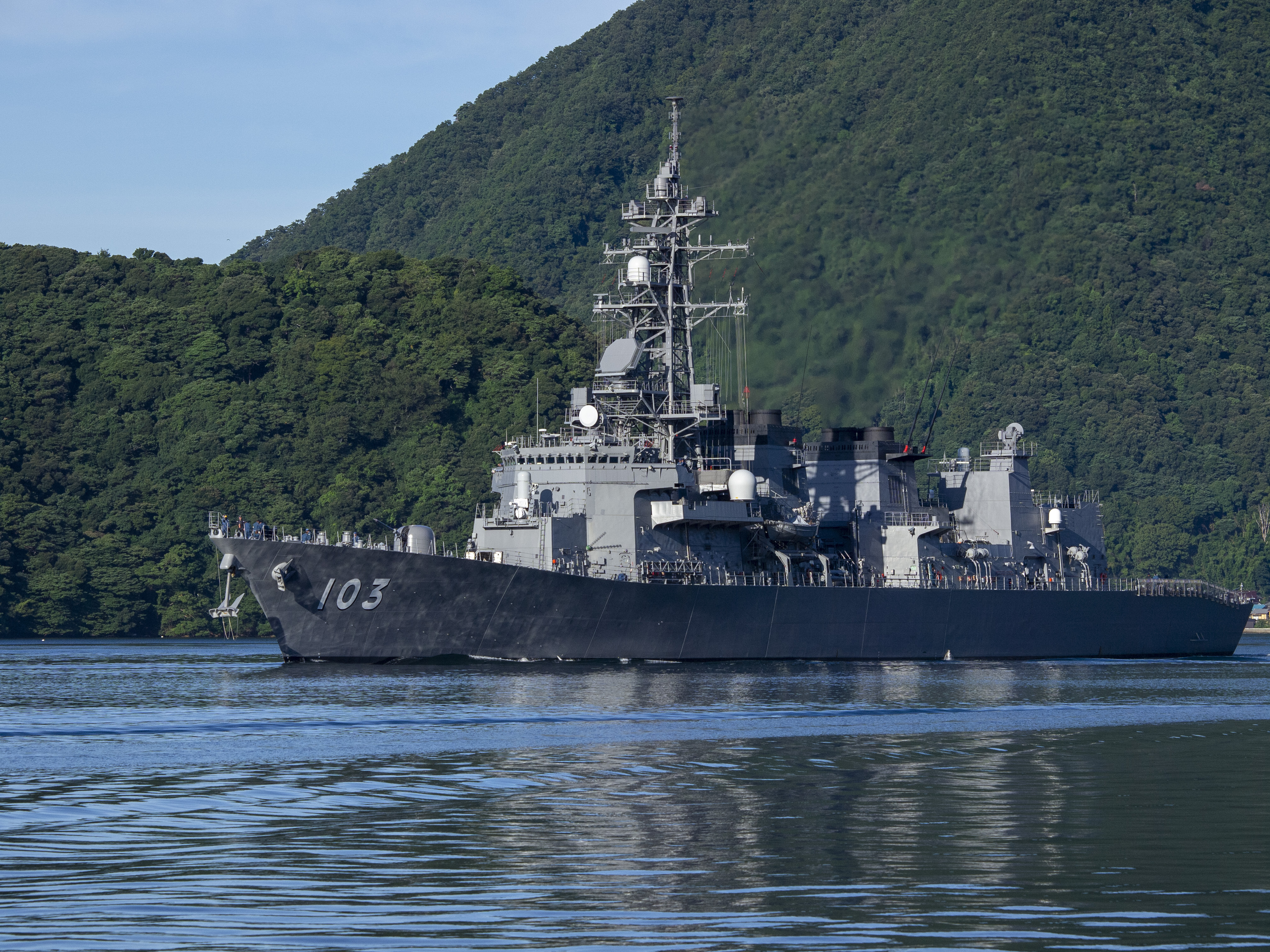
- JS Yūdachi on 7 September 2019.

History

Japan
- Name: Yūdachi; (ゆうだち)
- Ordered: 1994
- Builder: Mitsui, Tamano
- Laid down: 18 March 1996
- Launched: 19 August 1997
- Commissioned: 4 March 1999
- Home port: Ōminato
- Identification: MMSI number: 431999643; Pennant number: DD-103
- Status: Active

General characteristics
- Class & type: Murasame-class destroyer
- Displacement: 4,550 tons standard, 6,200 tons hull load
- Length: 151 m (495 ft 5 in)
- Beam: 17.4 m (57 ft 1 in)
- Draft: 5.2 m (17 ft 1 in)
- Propulsion: 2 × IHI-GE LM2500 gas turbines; 2 × KHI-RR SM1C gas turbines; 60,000 shp (45 MW); 2 shafts, cp props
- Speed: 30 knots (56 km/h; 35 mph)
- Complement: 165
- Sensors & processing systems: OYQ-9 CDS (w/ Link-11); OYQ-103 ASWCS; FCS-2-31 fire-control systems; OPS-24B air search radar; OPS-28 surface search radar; OQS-5 hull sonar; OQR-2 TASS
- Electronic warfare & decoys: NOLQ-3 suite; Mk. 36 SRBOC Chaff and Decoy Launching System; AN/SLQ-25 torpedo decoys
- Armament: 1 × OTO Melara 76 mm gun; 2 × 20 mm Phalanx CIWS; 8 × SSM-1B anti-ship missiles in quad canisters; 2 × triple 324 mm torpedo tubes; 16-cell Mk. 48 VLS with Evolved Sea Sparrow SAM; 16-cell Mk. 41 VLS with VL-ASROC
- Aircraft carried: 1 × SH-60J/K anti-submarine helicopter

JS Yūdachi (DD-103) is the third ship of the Murasame-class destroyers. She was commissioned on 4 March 1999.

== Design ==
The hull design was completely renovated from first-generation DDs. In addition to increasing the size in order to reduce the underwater radiation noise, both superstructure and hull was inclined to reduce the radar cross-section. There is however no angled tripod mainmast like that of the American Arleigh Burke-class destroyer because of the heavy weather of the Sea of Japan in winter. The aft was designed like a "mini-Oranda-zaka" as with the Kongō class to avoid interference between helicopters and mooring devices. Destroyers built under the First Defense Build-up Plan, including the former Murasame class, adopted a unique long forecastle style called "Oranda-zaka".

The engine arrangement is COGAG as same as Asagiri class, but a pair of engines are updated to Spey SM1C. And the remaining one pair are replaced by LM2500, same as Kongō class.

== Construction and career ==
Yūdachi was laid down on 18 March 1996 at Sumitomo Heavy Industries Yokosuka as the 1994 plan and launched on 19 August 1997. Commissioned on 4 March 1999, was incorporated into the 6th Escort Corps of the 4th Escort Corps and deployed to Ōminato.

On 6 March 2016, as the 24th dispatched anti-piracy action surface corps, she departed from Ominato base for the Gulf of Aden off the coast of Somalia with the escort ship JS Yūgiri and returned to Ominato on 8 September. In addition, on 1 September, on the way back to Japan, a goodwill training was conducted with the Philippine Navy's BRP Rajah Humabon.

Yūdachi left with the 40th Surface Force from Ominato on 10 October 2021 to conduct a 14-day anti-piracy operation off the coast of Somalia and in the Gulf of Aden. Owing to the spread of COVID-19 at the time, all of Yūdachi's crew underwent PCR testing before departure. While sailing through the South China Sea, Yūdachi conducted joint training with the Independence-class littoral combat ship USS Jackson on 28 October 2021.

Under Captain Wakushima Hidetaka, on 29 January 2022, Yūdachi was involved in a training exercise with the German frigate Bayern in the Gulf of Aden, with cross-deck, tactical and close-combat maneuvers being conducted. In the same year, from 1 to 4 March, Yūdachi participated in the Indian Navy-led multinational joint exercise MILAN 2022, near Visakhapatnam, which also marked the first time the JMSDF had taken part in this particular event. On 5 March Yūdachi conducted joint training with HMAS Arunta in the Bay of Bengal, and on the following day, she met RSS Tenacious of the Republic of Singapore Navy in a goodwill training. From 14 to 16 March 2022, Yūdachi joined USS Momsen and HMAS Arunta in a joint training in the South China Sea, accompinaied by the US Navy's P-8 and the RAAF's AP-3C. She returned to Ominato on 11 April of the same year.

On 21 September 2023 Yūdachi conducted joint training with USS Robert Smalls in Sagami Bay. In the same year, from 30 September to 10 October, she and Noshiro participated in a joint US-Japanese training south of Kanto region in the East China Sea with the aircraft carrier USS Ronald Reagan, cruisers Antietam and Robert Smalls, and the destroyer Shoup.

Yūdachi participated in another US-Japanese joint training in the East China Sea off the coast of southern Shikoku from 19 to 21 November 2023, this time with the carrier USS Carl Vinson, and destroyers Hopper, Kidd, Sterett, and William P. Lawrence.

Yūdachi participated at the International Fleet Review 2026 held at Visakapatanam in India in February 2026.

== Bibliography ==
- Abe, Yasuo (July 2000). "History of JMSDF Destroyers". Ships of the World (in Japanese) (571). Kaijinn-sha. NAID 40002155847.
