= TransAsia Airways Flight 510A =

1995 aviation accident in Taiwan

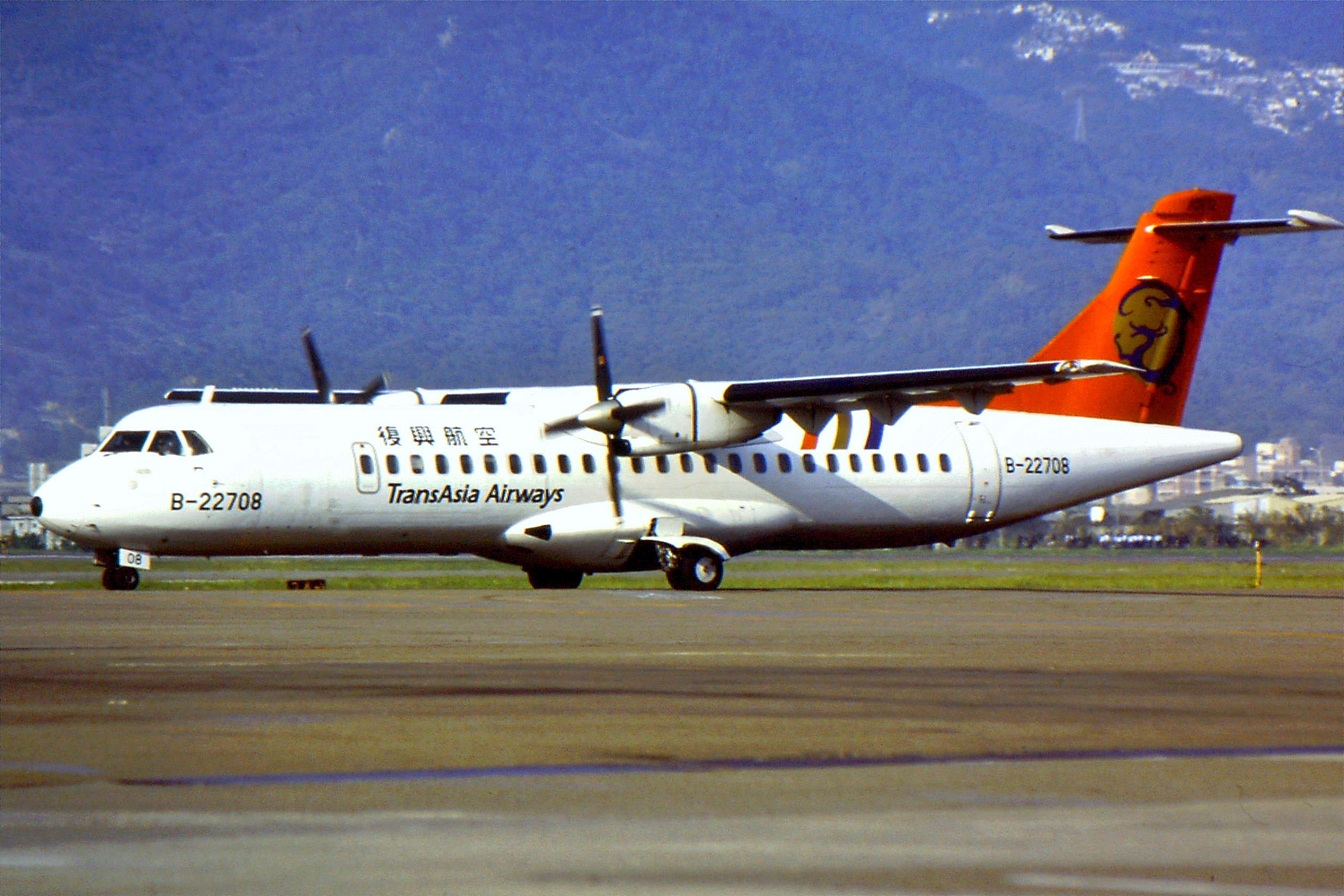
- A TransAsia Airways ATR 72-202 similar to the aircraft involved.

Accident
- Date: 30 January 1995
- Summary: Controlled flight into terrain due to pilot error
- Site: Tu-keng, Guishan District, Taoyuan, Taiwan; 24°59′7.977″N 121°22′8.982″E

Aircraft
- Aircraft type: ATR 72-200
- Operator: TransAsia Airways
- IATA flight No.: GE510A
- ICAO flight No.: TNA510A
- Call sign: TRANSASIA 510 ALPHA
- Registration: B-22717
- Flight origin: Magong Airport
- Destination: Songshan Airport
- Occupants: 4
- Crew: 4
- Fatalities: 4
- Survivors: 0

On 30 January 1995, TransAsia Airways Flight 510A crashed in Taiwan's Guishan District during a ferry flight.

== Background ==
=== Aircraft ===
The aircraft involved in the accident was an ATR 72-200. Registered B-22717 with serial number 435, it was manufactured on 16 November the previous year and had since accumulated 265 hours and 47 minutes of flight time. It was equipped with two Pratt & Whitney PW124B turboprops, both had flown for nearly 275 hours.

=== Crew ===
The captain, 54-year-old Wang Hongjia, was the pilot monitoring. He had clocked over 17,000 hours of flight time with almost 2,000 hours on the ATR 72. The first officer, 58-year-old Li Guangzhi, was the pilot flying. He had accumulated a total flying experience of nearly 6,900 hours, of which more than 4,400 hours were on the make and model. Two flight attendants, 26-year-old Lau Wai-hing and 25-year-old Lin Ziya, were also on-board the flight.

== Accident ==
The aircraft, an ATR 72-200, had just dropped off passengers in Penghu for the Lunar New Year and was being ferried back to Taipei. During approach the aircraft deviated from its assigned course and crashed into a hill, killing all four crew members on board.

== Investigation ==
The investigation revealed that the flight crew failed to maintain situational awareness and did not cross check their navigation aids.
