= TransAsia Airways =

Airline of Taiwan (1951–2016)

TransAsia Airways 復興航空

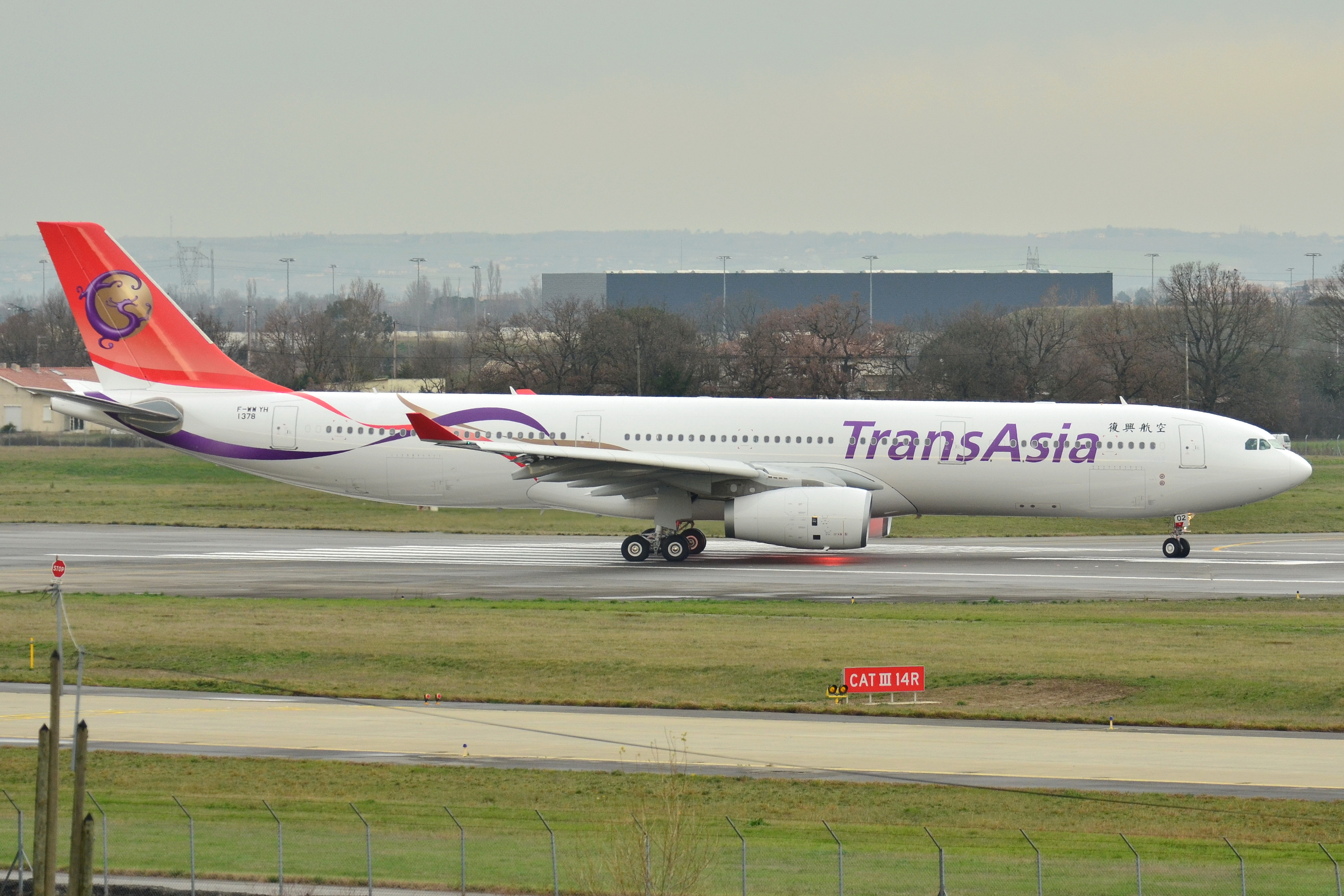
- Airbus A330-300
IATA	ICAO	Call sign
GE	TNA	TRANSASIA
- Founded: 21 May 1951 (as Foshing Airlines)
- Commenced operations: 1 January 1992 (as TransAsia Airways)
- Ceased operations: 22 November 2016
- Hubs: Kaohsiung; Taipei–Songshan; Taipei–Taoyuan
- Frequent-flyer program: Legend Flight Club
- Subsidiaries: V Air; TransAsia Catering Services; Legend Travel Service
- Parent company: Goldsun Construction & Development
- Headquarters: Neihu, Taipei, Taiwan
- Key people: Vincent M. Lin (chairman); Daniel Liu (CEO)

TransAsia Airways (TNA, until January 1992 known in English by its Chinese-transliterated name Foshing Airlines; traditional Chinese: 復興航空; simplified Chinese: 复兴航空; pinyin: Fùxīng Hángkōng) was a Taiwanese airline based in Neihu District in Taipei. Though the company started its operations focusing mainly on the Taiwanese domestic market, it operated on many scheduled international routes and focused mainly on Southeast and Northeast Asia and cross-strait flights at the time of closure.

TransAsia suspended operations and shut down indefinitely on 22 November 2016 after a pair of hull loss incidents that occurred within months. Its low-cost subsidiary V Air had already ceased operations in October 2016.

== History ==
=== Foshing Airlines ===
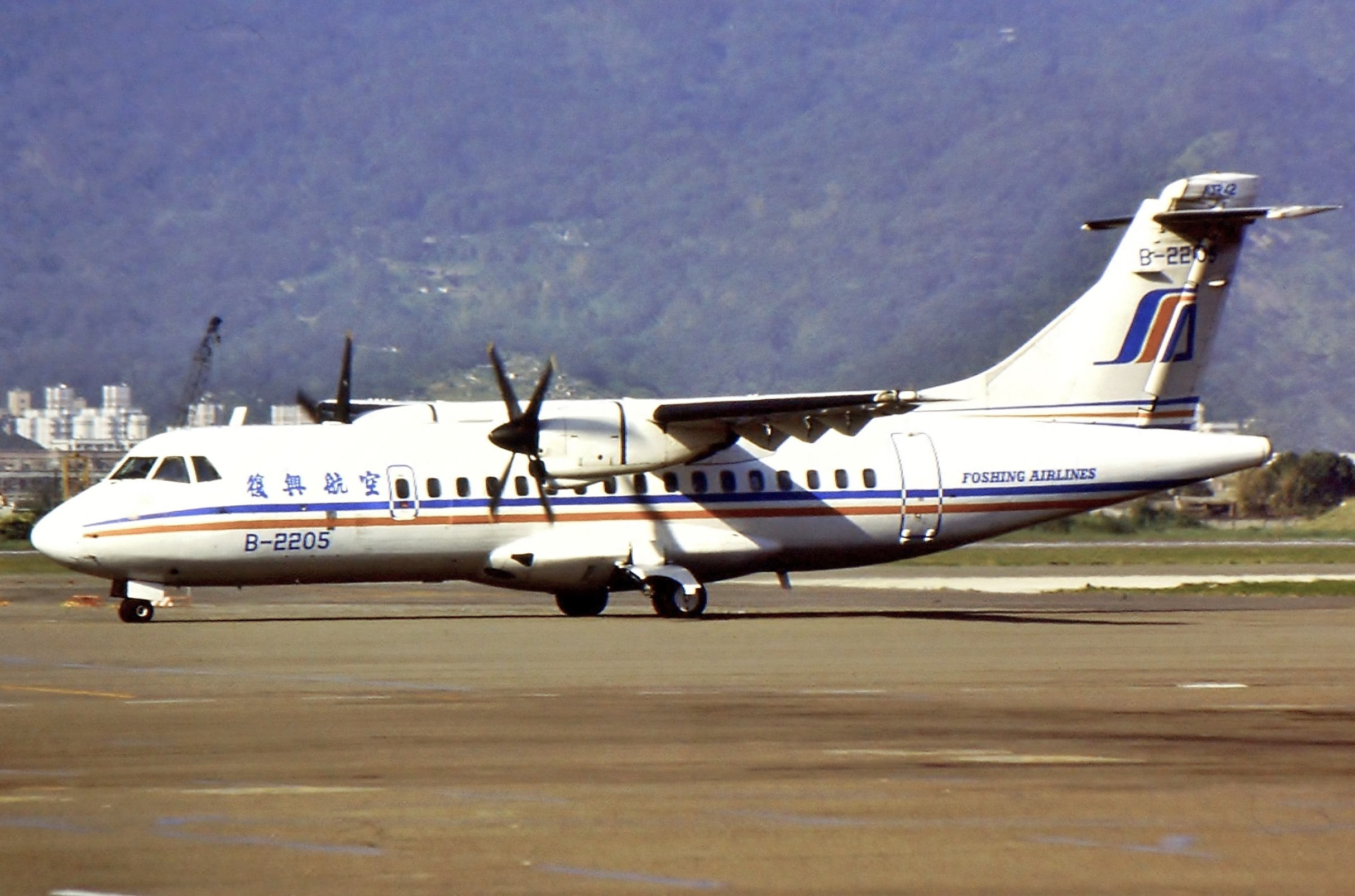
Foshing Airlines ATR 42-300

On 21 May 1951, FOSHIN TRANSPORT CORP. (Foshing Airlines) was formed as the first private civil airline in Taiwan, flying the Taipei - Hualien - Taitung - Kaohsiung route. It also served as local agent for foreign airlines and provided airport ground handling services for foreign airlines.

On 16 October 1958, the management of the airline decided to concentrate its attention on the agency businesses, ceasing domestic services, and strengthening the agency business. It established its airline meal catering services at Songshan Airport (TSA) in 1966. The airline completed a restructure in 1983 and in 1988, domestic flights resumed after a 30-year absence from the market. In 1991, the first ATR 72 aircraft joined the airline.

=== TransAsia Airways ===
Upon launching international routes in January 1992, the English translation changed to "TransAsia Airways" while the Chinese name remained the same. In 1992, unscheduled charter services to international destinations, including Laoag, Manila, Cebu, Phnom Penh, Surabaya, Yangon, Phuket, Danang, and Manado, started. The Airbus A320 joined the fleet, becoming the airline's first jet aircraft.

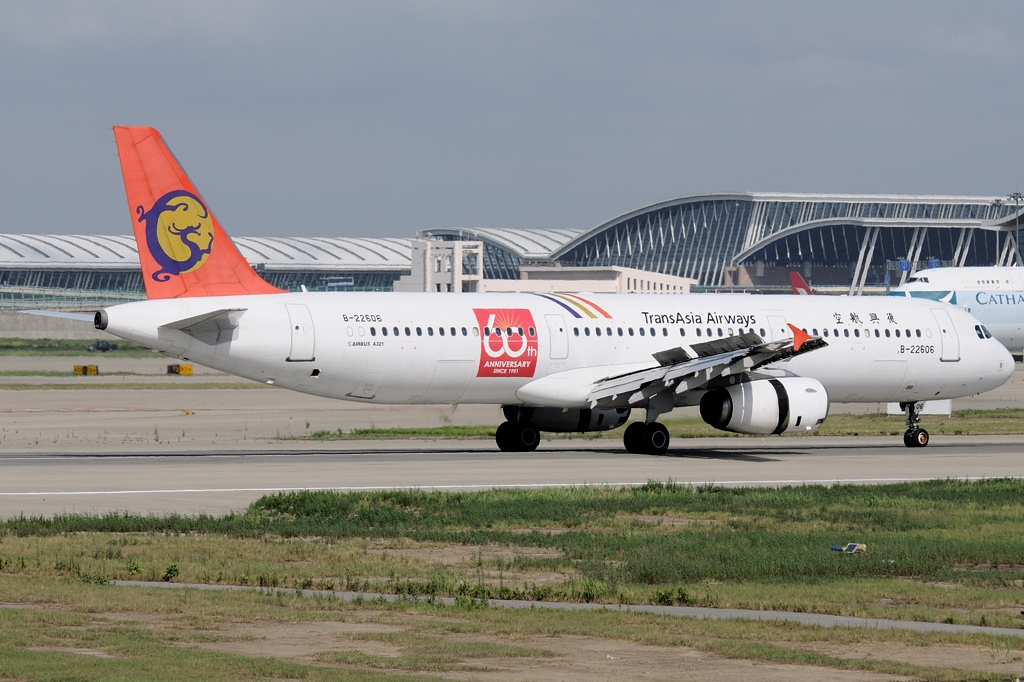
Airbus A321

In 1995, the first scheduled international services started to Macau and Surabaya. In early 2012, the airline was reported to be considering an order for Airbus A380 aircraft to facilitate expansion to the United States.

On 1 November 2011, TransAsia Airways was listed on the Taiwan Stock Exchange. In May 2013, the headquarters moved from Datong District, Taipei to Neihu District, Taipei.

In January 2014, the airline announced plans to launch a budget airline named V Air. It commenced operations in December of that year. The budget airline closed on 1 October 2016 and merged with TransAsia.

On 21 November 2016, due to a financial crisis caused by the crashes of Flight 222 and Flight 235, the airline suspended all operations and refunded ticketed passengers. The trading of its stock was suspended simultaneously. The next day, the airline announced an indefinite suspension of operations and refunded all passengers with outstanding tickets. As of 2017, some routes operated by TransAsia Airways had been reopened by EVA Air, specifically Taipei Songshan to Chongqing, Hangzhou (operated by UNI air), and Tianjin.

On 11 January 2017, the company's shareholders voted to liquidate it.

On 29 June 2018, the company entered bankruptcy and its license was permanently revoked on July 1.

== Corporate affairs ==
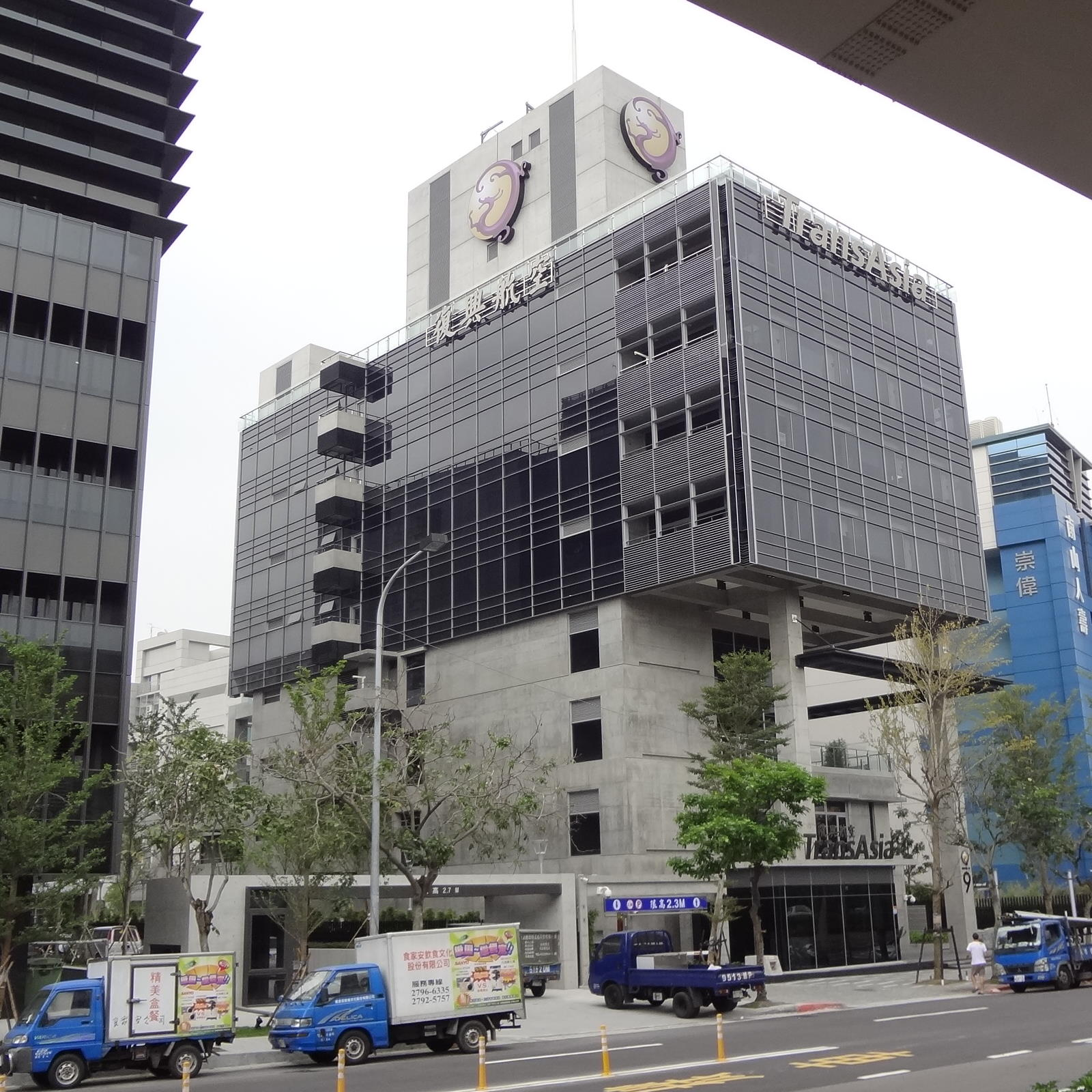
TransAsia headquarters

=== Ground services ===
Besides flight operations, the airline undertook ground handling and ticketing for a number of foreign airlines, such as Thai Airways International, Jetstar, XiamenAir, Sichuan Airlines, and Cebu Pacific. In addition, private jet service was also part of agency services. Since 2006, the airline had cooperated with International SOS to serve medical flights between Mainland China and Taiwan. The airline began its catering service near the Taipei SongShan Airport in 1966 and was officially named TransAsia Catering Services in 2002. Legend Travel Service Ltd, founded in 2011, provided travel- and tourism-related services under the airline group resources.

=== Brand and livery ===
TransAsia Airways introduced a new livery for both staff and aircraft in 2012. Former Shiatzy Chen designer Yin Pei Gun was responsible for the new cabin attendant and ground staff uniforms that appeared that August. The new plane livery, designed by local Taipei company Pace Design, was to be painted on the new Airbus A330, A321ceo, A321neo, and ATR 72-600.

== Destinations ==
As of November 2016, when it ceased its operations, TransAsia Airways flew to the following destinations:

Country	City	Airport	Notes	Refs
China	Changsha	Changsha Huanghua International Airport		
China	Chongqing	Chongqing Jiangbei International Airport		
China	Fuzhou	Fuzhou Changle International Airport		
China	Guiyang	Guiyang Longdongbao International Airport		
China	Hangzhou	Hangzhou Xiaoshan International Airport		
China	Hefei	Hefei Xinqiao International Airport		
China	Nanning	Nanning Wuxu International Airport		
China	Shanghai	Shanghai Hongqiao International Airport		
China	Shanghai	Shanghai Pudong International Airport		
China	Tianjin	Tianjin Binhai International Airport		
China	Wuhan	Wuhan Tianhe International Airport		
China	Wuxi	Sunan Shuofang International Airport		
China	Xiamen	Xiamen Gaoqi International Airport		
China	Xuzhou	Xuzhou Guanyin Airport		
China	Zhangjiajie	Zhangjiajie Hehua Airport		
Japan	Asahikawa	Asahikawa Airport		
Japan	Fukuoka	Fukuoka Airport	Planned	
Japan	Hakodate	Hakodate Airport		
Japan	Naha	Naha Airport		
Japan	Osaka	Kansai International Airport		
Japan	Sapporo	New Chitose Airport		
Japan	Sendai	Sendai Airport		
Japan	Tokyo	Narita International Airport		
Singapore	Singapore	Changi Airport		
South Korea	Busan	Gimhae International Airport	Planned	
South Korea	Jeju	Jeju International Airport		
Taiwan	Hualien	Hualien Airport		
Taiwan	Kaohsiung	Kaohsiung International Airport	Hub	
Taiwan	Kinmen	Kinmen Airport		
Taiwan	Makung	Makung Airport		
Taiwan	Taichung	Taichung International Airport		
Taiwan	Taipei	Songshan Airport	Hub	
Taiwan	Taipei	Taoyuan International Airport	Hub	
Thailand	Bangkok	Suvarnabhumi Airport	Planned	
Thailand	Chiang Mai	Chiang Mai International Airport		

=== Codeshare agreements ===
TransAsia Airways had codeshare agreements with the following airlines:

- Shenzhen Airlines
- Sichuan Airlines
- XiamenAir

== Fleet ==
Throughout its existence, TransAsia Airways (and its predecessor Foshing Airlines) had operated the following aircraft types:

TransAsia Airways fleet
Aircraft	Total	Introduced	Retired	Notes
ATR 42-300	3	1988	1999	
ATR 42-320	2	1992	1993	
ATR 72-201	8	1990	2007	
ATR 72-202	5	1992	2006	
ATR-72-500	9	1997	2016	
ATR 72-600	8	2014	2018	
Airbus A320-200	15	1992	2016	
Airbus A321-100	6	1995	2016	
Airbus A321-200	6	2015	2018	
Airbus A330-300	4	2012	2016	

Most of the TransAsia fleet was leased and quickly reclaimed by lessors after TransAsia shut down, leaving just the ATR fleet, two Airbus A321 aircraft, and two Airbus A330-300 aircraft, which had been owned by TransAsia. The Airbus aircraft were auctioned off to Avianca for US$364 million, financed by a sale-leaseback on Avianca's end. After the disposal of the Airbus aircraft to Avianca, only the 7 ATR 72-600 remained, initially stored at Taoyuan International Airport, but reregistered to the Guernsey civil register and since moved to Mönchengladbach Airport.

== Services ==
=== Business Class ===
The business class seating offered on the Airbus A330-300 was in a 2-2-2 configuration, using seats with a 172-degree recline. Each seat had an AVOD system with a 15.4-inch monitor, AC and USB sockets, adjustable reading lights, and multiple storage bins. The seats on the Airbus A320-200 and Airbus A321-100 used a 2-2 seating configuration, with a 160-degree recline.

=== Economy Class ===
Economy Class was in a 2-4-2 configuration on the Airbus A330, a 3-3 configuration on the Airbus A320 and Airbus A321, and a 2-2 configuration on the ATR series. The seats had a pitch of 30 to 32 inches and a 6-degree recline. The AVOD system was only on the Airbus A330, with a 9-inch monitor.

=== In-flight amenities ===
The In-flight entertainment system of TransAsia Airways, named Sky Legend, used Panasonic's eX2 IFE system. It contained real-time flight information, music, movies, and video games. Available languages were English, Japanese, Traditional Chinese, and Simplified Chinese. Renaissance was the in-flight magazine published by TransAsia Airways; it had content in Traditional Chinese, English, and Japanese. The magazine introduced culture, arts, food, people, design, and style from its destinations.

== Accidents and incidents ==
- 30 January 1995: Flight 510A, an ATR 72-200 (registered B-22717), crashed into a hillside during flight from Penghu to Taipei. All four crew members died.
- 6 January 1996: Flight 529, an Airbus A321-100 en route to Tainan, was hijacked by a man, who was disappointed with domestic political and social developments in Taiwan. He gave a note to one of the flight attendants, claiming to have a bomb. He demanded that the aircraft be flown to Fujian Province, China. The hijacker agreed to allow the crew to land the aircraft in Tainan for refueling; he was arrested after the aircraft landed.
- 21 December 2002: Flight 791, an ATR 72-200 (registered B-22708), crashed due to icing during a flight from Taipei to Macau. Both crew members died. The aircraft encountered severe icing conditions beyond the certification envelope of the aircraft for such conditions and crashed into the sea 17 km (11 mi) southwest of Makung city. The investigation by the Aviation Safety Council of Taiwan found that the crash was caused by ice accumulation around the aircraft's major components, resulting in the crew losing control. The investigation identified that the flight crew did not respond to the severe icing conditions with the appropriate alert situation awareness and did not take the necessary actions.
- 21 March 2003: Flight 543, an Airbus A321-100 (registered B-22603), collided with a truck while landing at Tainan Airport at the end of a flight from Taipei Songshan Airport. The truck trespassed onto the runway without its occupants noticing the incoming aircraft. None of the 175 passengers and crew were injured but the two people inside the truck were injured in the collision. The aircraft was severely damaged in the accident and was written off.
- 18 October 2004:, Flight 536, an Airbus A320-200 (registered B-22310) overran runway 10 while landing at Taipei Songshan Airport and sustained damage to its landing gear and engines. All 106 people survived without any injuries. The aircraft was repaired and returned to service.
- 19 July 2005: Flight 028, an ATR 72-212A (registered B-22805), landed at Taipei Songshan Airport. As the aircraft taxied on Taxiway CC after landing, it made an early right turn onto a service road. The aircraft's right wing hit a light pole and stopped. Two pilots, two flight attendants, and 24 passengers were on board. One flight attendant suffered a minor injury. The front spar of the right wing was damaged.

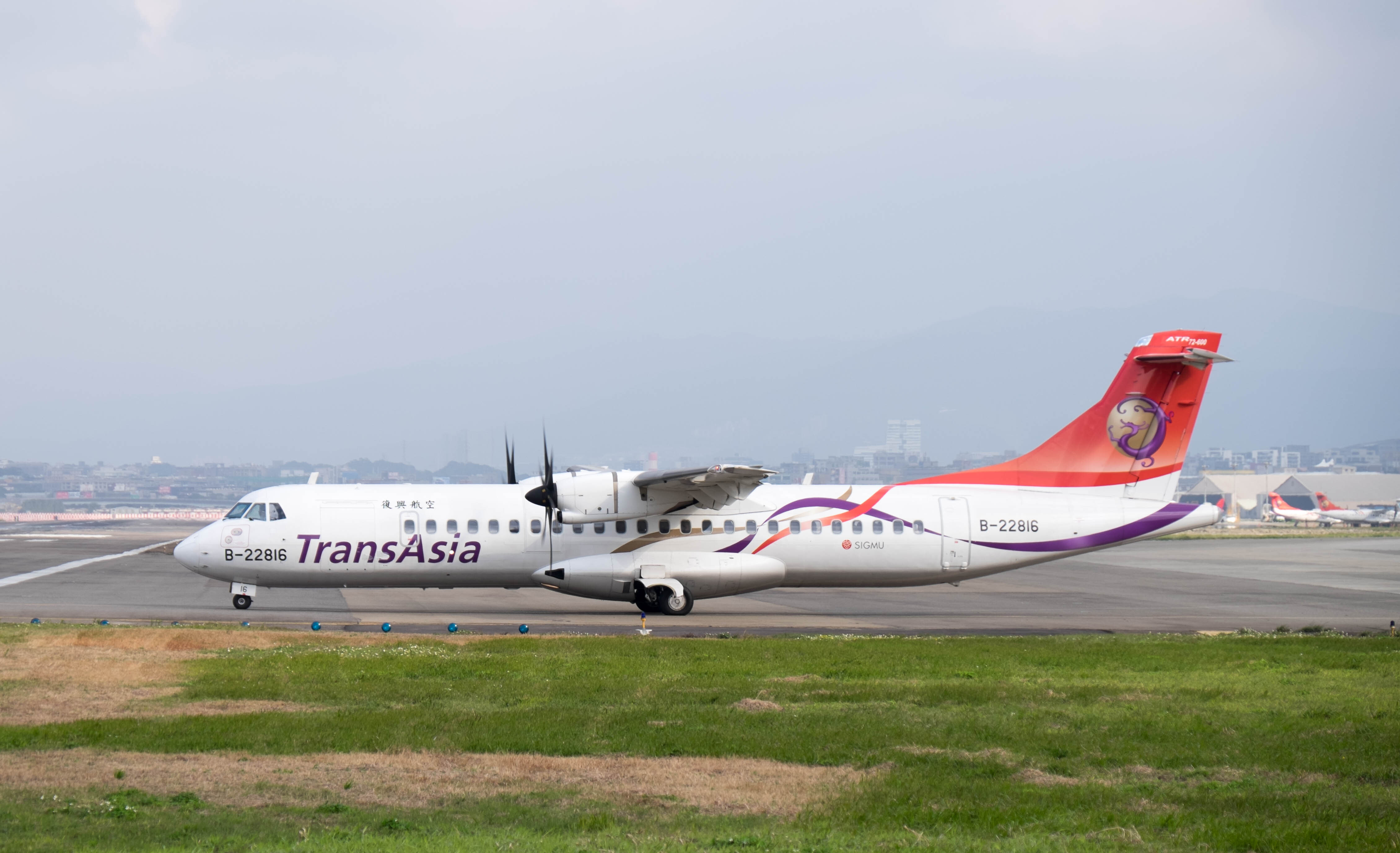
TransAsia Airways ATR 72-600 which crashed when operating Flight 235

- 23 July 2014: Flight 222, an ATR 72-500 (registered B-22810) carrying 54 passengers and four crew members from Kaohsiung to Magong, crashed near Magong Airport on Penghu Island. 48 people were confirmed dead while at least seven of the eleven survivors were seriously injured. Some reports suggest there were also five casualties on the ground when the aircraft impacted residential buildings. This crash was the deadliest for the airline. The cause was the pilot's intentional descent below the minimum descent altitude during an approach in Typhoon Matmo.
- 4 February 2015: Flight 235, an ATR 72-600 (registered B-22816), had an engine failure after takeoff from Songshan Airport and crashed at 10:56 a.m. local time into the Keelung River near Taipei, killing 43 of the 53 passengers and five crew on board. This was the second deadly crash in eight months for the airline, prompting an order to ground all of the airline's ATR pilots until they had successfully taken part in an oral exam about emergency procedures.

== See also ==
- List of companies of Taiwan
- List of defunct airlines of Taiwan
