= U-Land Airlines =

Airline of Taiwan (1989–2000)

IATA	ICAO	Call sign
WI	—	—
- Founded: May 1989 (as China-Asia Airlines)
- Commenced operations: November 1994 (as U-Land Airlines)
- Ceased operations: June 2000
- Hubs: Taipei–Songshan
- Focus cities: Kaohsiung; Kinmen
- Fleet size: 6
- Parent company: U-Land Building Co., Ltd
- Headquarters: Taipei, Taiwan
- Key people: Zhou Qirui; Zhou Qichang; K. G. Wang; Alexis Page

U-Land Airlines (Chinese: 瑞聯航空; pinyin: Ruìlián hángkōng) was a Taiwanese low-cost carrier based in Taipei. The airline was the first low-cost carrier in Taiwan, which operated domestic and short-haul international routes. Having gone bankrupt in 2001, it was affiliated to U-Land Building Co., Ltd before it ceased operations, and is known to be the first Taiwanese airline company to have gone bankrupt.

== History ==
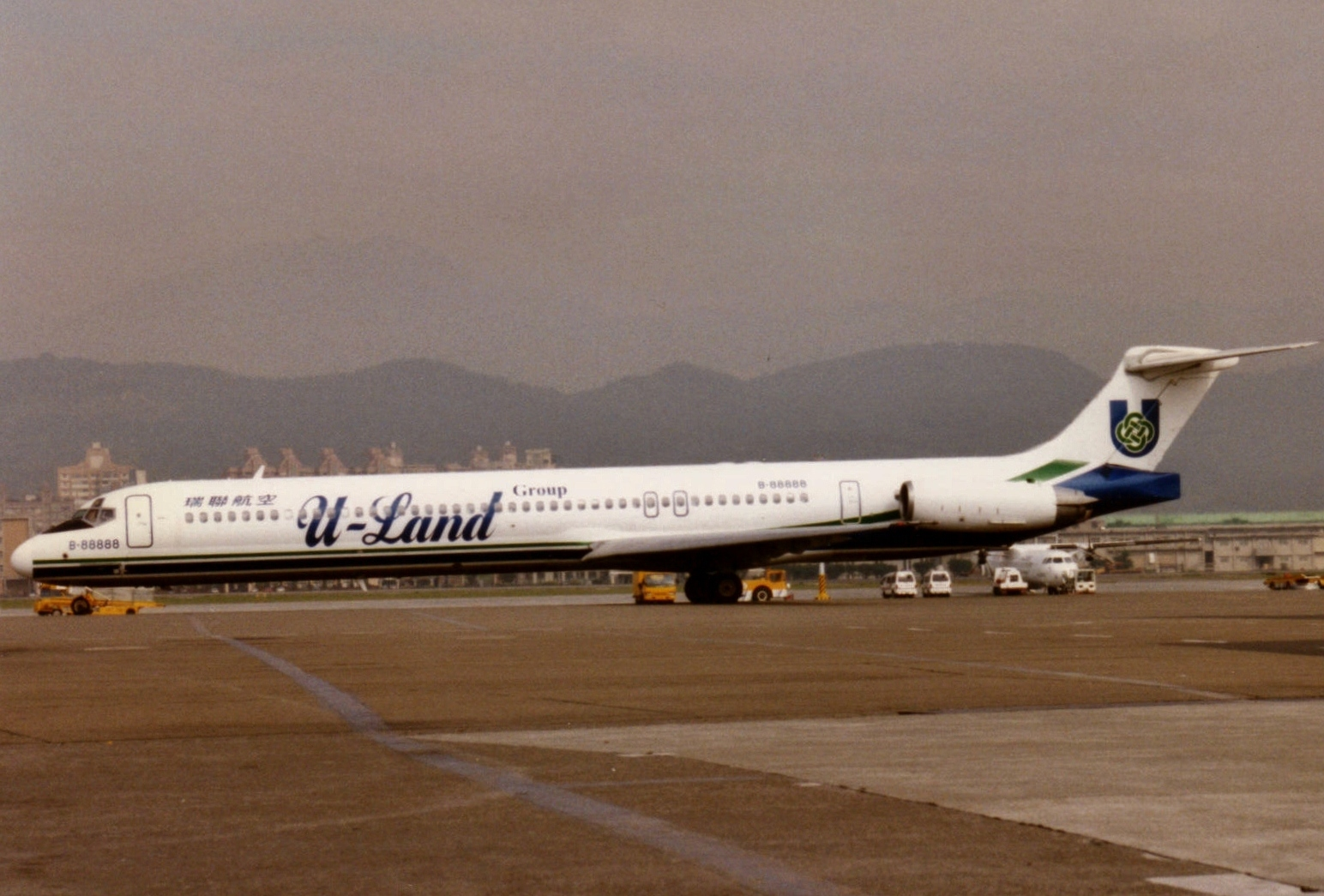
U-Land Airlines B-88888 McDonnell Douglas MD-82 in 1997

U-Land Airlines was previously known as China-Asia Airlines, established on May 19, 1989, with capital registered of NT $200 million and 120 employees, authorized to fly the regular route from Taipei–Kaohsiung, as well as Taipei–Kinmen. China-Asia Airlines was affiliated to Chinese Kuomintang legislators from the company owned by the family of Wu De-mei, An Feng Industrial. The company only had a 36-seater Short 360 propeller aircraft when it was established and was mainly responsible for non-scheduled charter operations.

In the early 1990s, the company introduced a project named "U-Land World" and several other large construction cases in the middle area of Taiwan and was well known for a time. The funders–Zhou Qi-Rui and Zhou Qi-Chang–decided to expand to different industries and planned to buy China-Asia Airlines which at the time had nearly ceased any operations. In November 1994, China-Asia Airlines was bought and renamed as U-Land Airlines. It also became a member of the U-Land Corporation and purchased six McDonnell Douglas aircraft.

=== Financial troubles ===
In 1997, the Asian financial crisis began, and Taiwan's real estate market declined. The issue of an excess of empty newly built properties had hit the U-Land Building corporation hardly, and their losses reached nearly NT $2.5 billion, associated with U-Land Airlines. In December 1998, they leased B-88898, a McDonnell Douglas MD-82, to Air Philippines (now PAL Express) to carry out the Taiwan route. In March 2000, U-Land Airlines leased the same plane to Pacific Airlines (now Jetstar Pacific) to carry out Taiwan routes.

== Grounding ==
Due to its weak financial status and flight safety record, U-Land Airlines had been ordered to cease operating twice by the Civil Aeronautics Administration of Taiwan. As of June 26, 2000, U-Land Airlines had accumulated a total of NT $18,396,377, including nine cash grants of NT $11,106,486 and 2000. The CAA informed the relevant airlines according to Article 14 of the "charges for the use of aeronautical stations, aircraft, aids to navigation facilities and those related" and Article 9 of the "regulations on the use of buildings, land, and other equipment under the jurisdiction of [them]" on July 1, 2000 to stop the airline from using Taipei Songshan Airport and other related facilities, and talked to the lawyer Li Chao-Xiong for a follow-up to remind about debt matters.

On November 13, 2001, the CAA revoked the "civil air transport industry permit" for U-Land Airlines. By August 2003, the Kaohsiung District Court auction by the Farmers Bank of China and Taiwan Business Bank filed to seize a pair of McDonnell Douglas MD-82 aircraft formerly operated by the airline. The reserve prices were NT $279,366,120 and NT $262,368,480, but no bidders were found.

By the end of 2001, all the former U-Land Airlines employees decided to protest on the streets for their own rights to work, but the CAA denied them and still maintained the license's 'to remove' status. Within a decade, most of them had been re-employed in other airlines to work: the last wave of protests ended in late 2004. At that time, the U-Land Airlines name had officially been withdrawn from use by local media outlets.
