= JS Yūgiri =

Asagiri-class destroyer

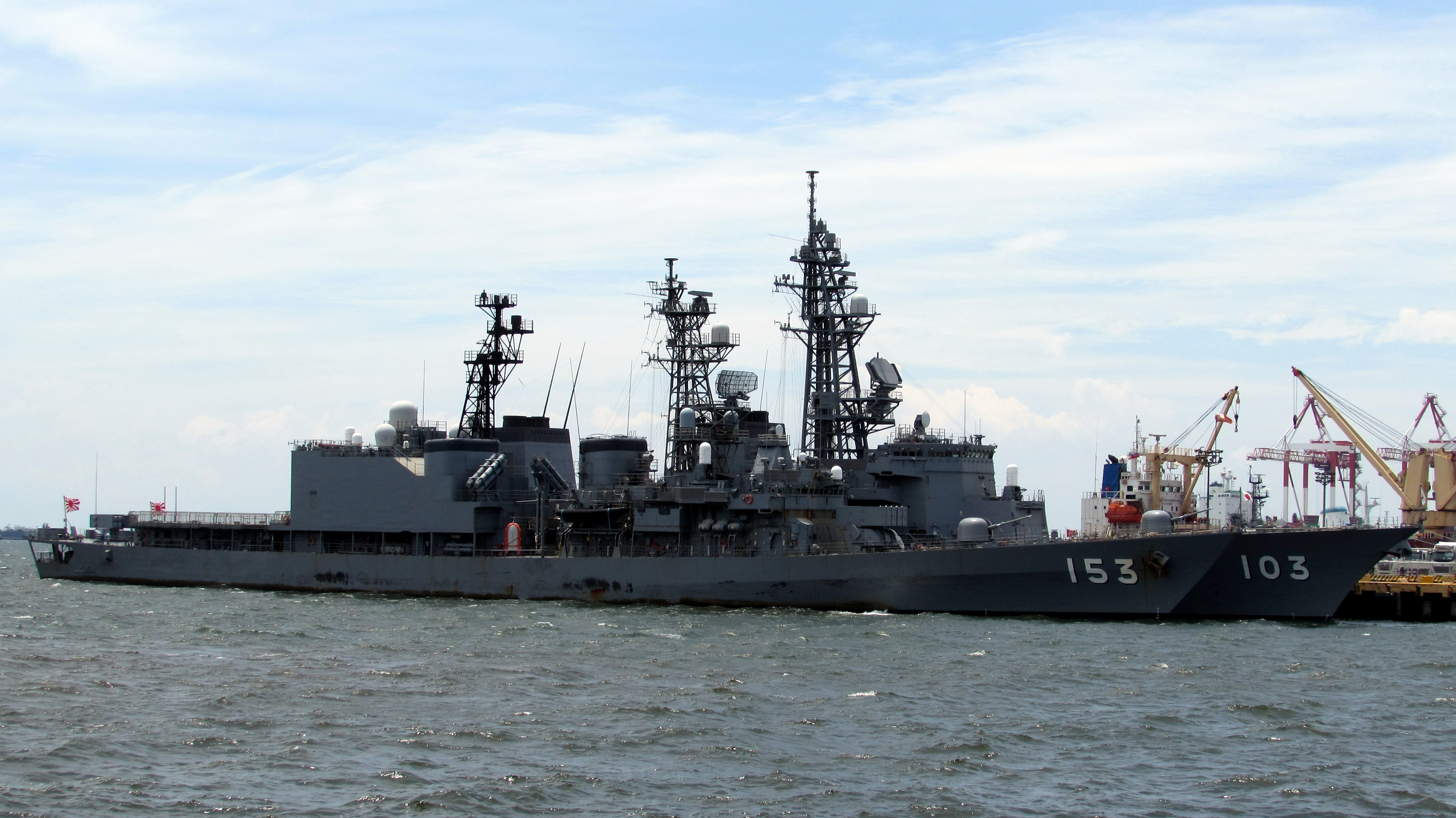
- JS Yūgiri and JS Yūdachi at Manila on 31 August 2016

History

Japan
- Name: Yūgiri; (ゆうぎり)
- Ordered: 1984
- Builder: Sumitomo, Uraga
- Laid down: 25 February 1986
- Launched: 21 September 1987
- Commissioned: 28 February 1989
- Home port: Yokosuka
- Identification: MMSI number: 431999535; Pennant number: DD-153
- Status: Active

General characteristics
- Class & type: Asagiri-class destroyer
- Length: 137 m (449 ft 6 in)
- Beam: 14.6 m (47 ft 11 in)
- Draft: 4.5 m (14 ft 9 in)
- Propulsion: 4 gas turbines 54,000 shp (40,000 kW)
- Speed: 30 knots (56 km/h; 35 mph)
- Range: 8,030 nmi (14,870 km; 9,240 mi) at 14 knots (26 km/h; 16 mph)
- Complement: 220
- Sensors & processing systems: OYQ-6/7 CDS (w/ Link-11); OPS-14/24 Air search radar; OPS-28 surface search radar; OQS-4A hull sonar; OQR-1 TACTASS
- Electronic warfare & decoys: NOLR-8 intercept; OLT-3 jammer; Mark 36 SRBOC
- Armament: 1 × Otobreda 76 mm gun; 2 × missile canister up to 8 Harpoon SSM; 2 × 20 mm Phalanx CIWS; 1 × Mk.29 Sea Sparrow SAM octuple launcher; 1 × Mk.16 ASROC anti-submarine rocket octuple launcher; 2 × HOS-302A triple 324 mm (12.8 in) torpedo tubes
- Aircraft carried: 1 SH-60J(K) anti-submarine helicopter

JS Yūgiri (DD-153) is an Asagiri-class destroyer of the Japan Maritime Self-Defense Force.

== Development and design ==
The Asagiri class is equipped for combat and interception missions, and is primarily armed with anti-ship weapons. They carry two of the Mk-141 Guided Missile Launching System (GMLS), which are anti-ship missile systems. The ship is also fitted to be used against submarines. She also carries the Mk-32 Surface Vessel Torpedo Tubes (SVTT), which can be used as an anti-submarine weapon. The ship has two of these systems abeam to starboard and to port. They are fitted with an Oto-Melara 76/62-caliber gun to be used against sea and air targets.

They are 137 m (449 ft 6 in) long. The ship has a range of 8,000 nautical miles (15,000 km; 9,200 mi) at 14 knots (26 km/h; 16 mph) with a top speed of 30 knots (56 km/h; 35 mph). The ship can have up to 220 personnel on board. The ship is also fitted to accommodate one aircraft. The ship's flight deck can be used to service a SH-60J9(K) Seahawk helicopter.

== Construction and career ==
Yūgiri was laid down on 25 February 1986 and launched on 19 September 1986 by Sumitomo Heavy Industries, Uraga. She was commissioned on 17 March 1988.

The destroyer participated in maritime training in the Philippines from 1 July to 4 August 1995. On 2 November, the same year, US Secretary of Defense William J. Perry visited the ship. The ship participated in the Exercise RIMPAC from 19 May to 13 August 1996. On 4 June, the vessel was involved in an exercise with a US Navy aircraft carrier towing a target during a shooting training with a 20 mm cannon (CIWS) over the western Pacific Ocean about 2,400 km (1,500 mi) west of Hawaii. An incident occurred in which an A-6E carrier-based attack aircraft from USS Independence was shot down by mistake (the pilots were rescued by an escape internal fireboat of Yūgiri). Though a malfunction in the Phalanx CIWS was initially implicated as the cause of the incident, human error was later blamed.

The vessel was dispatched to the Great East Japan Earthquake caused by the 2011 off the Pacific coast of Tōhoku Earthquake on 11 March 2011.

On 31 August 2012, the 13th dispatched anti-piracy action water squadron departed from Ōminato for the Gulf of Aden off the coast of Somalia with JS Makinami. On 23 January 2013, on her way home after completing her mission, she conducted goodwill training with the Maldives National Defense Force Coast Guard patrol boat Shaheed Ali in the Indian Ocean, and returned to Ōminato on 11 February. On 7 March 2013, she was transferred to the 11th Escort Squadron under the direct control of the escort fleet due to reorganization, and the fixed port became Yokosuka again and transferred to the same area. After the transfer, undergo regular inspections and life extension work at Hakodate Dock.

On 6 March 2016, as the 24th dispatched anti-piracy action water squadron, sailed from Yokosuka base to the Gulf of Aden off the coast of Somalia with JS Yūdachi and returned to Yokosuka on 7 September. In addition, on 1 September on the way back to Japan, a goodwill training was conducted with the Philippine Navy's BRP Rajah Humabon.

In 2021, the ship participated in Exercise AMAN-21 in Pakistan and later visited Karachi port for joint naval exercises with the Pakistan Navy.

JS Yūgiri participated in JIMEX 24 (Japan-India Maritime Exercise) exercise along with INS Shivalik of Indian Navy from 11 June 2024.

== Gallery ==
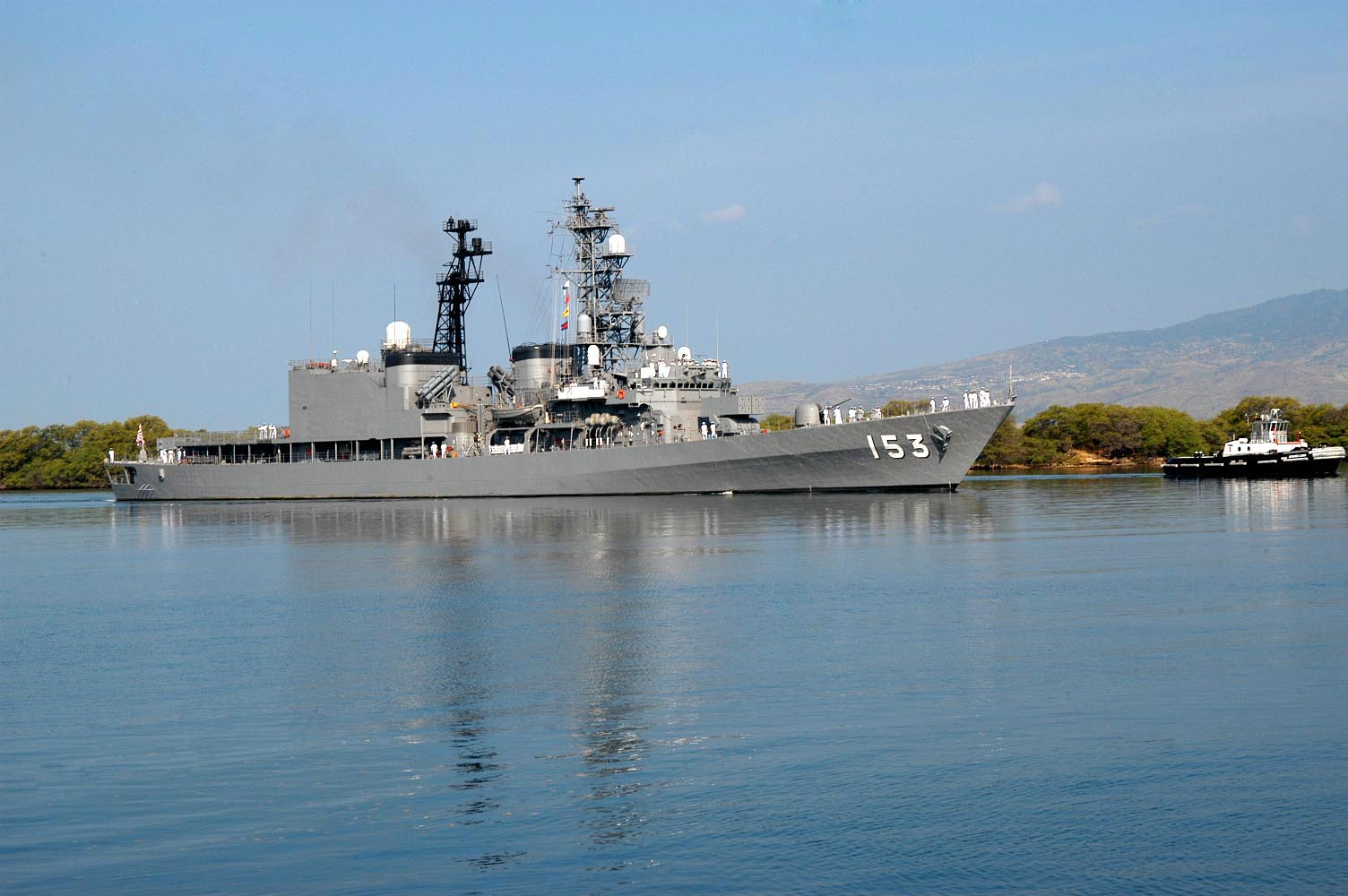
JS Yūgiri in Pearl Harbor, 3 May 2005

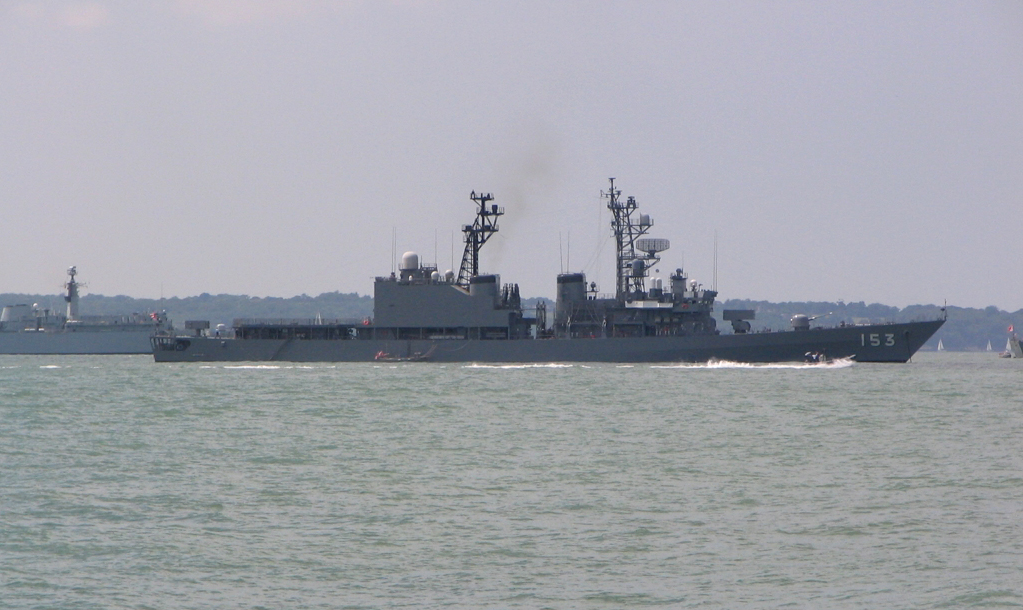
JS Yūgiri at Trafalgar on 26 June 2005.

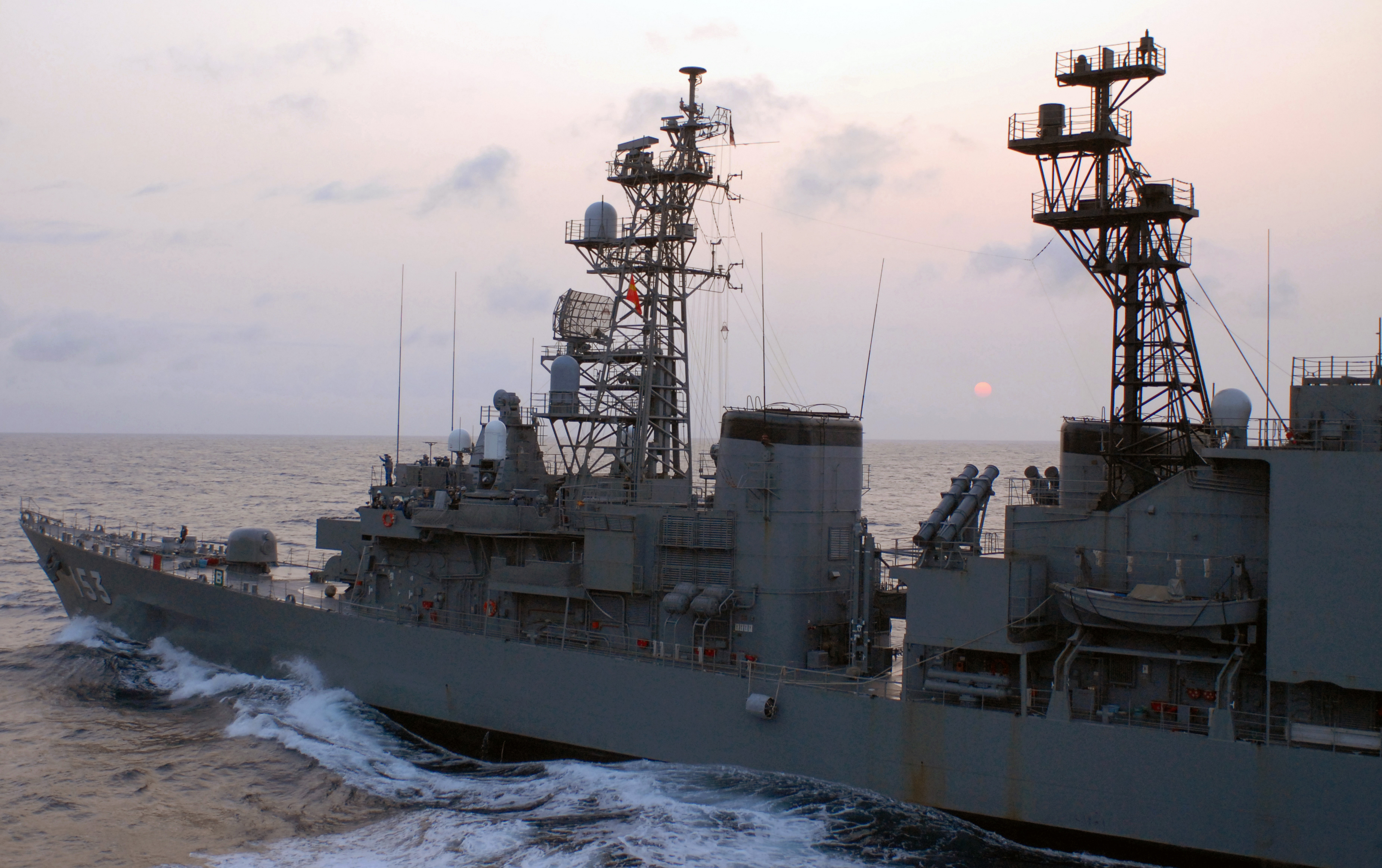
JS Yūgiri on 17 March 2007.

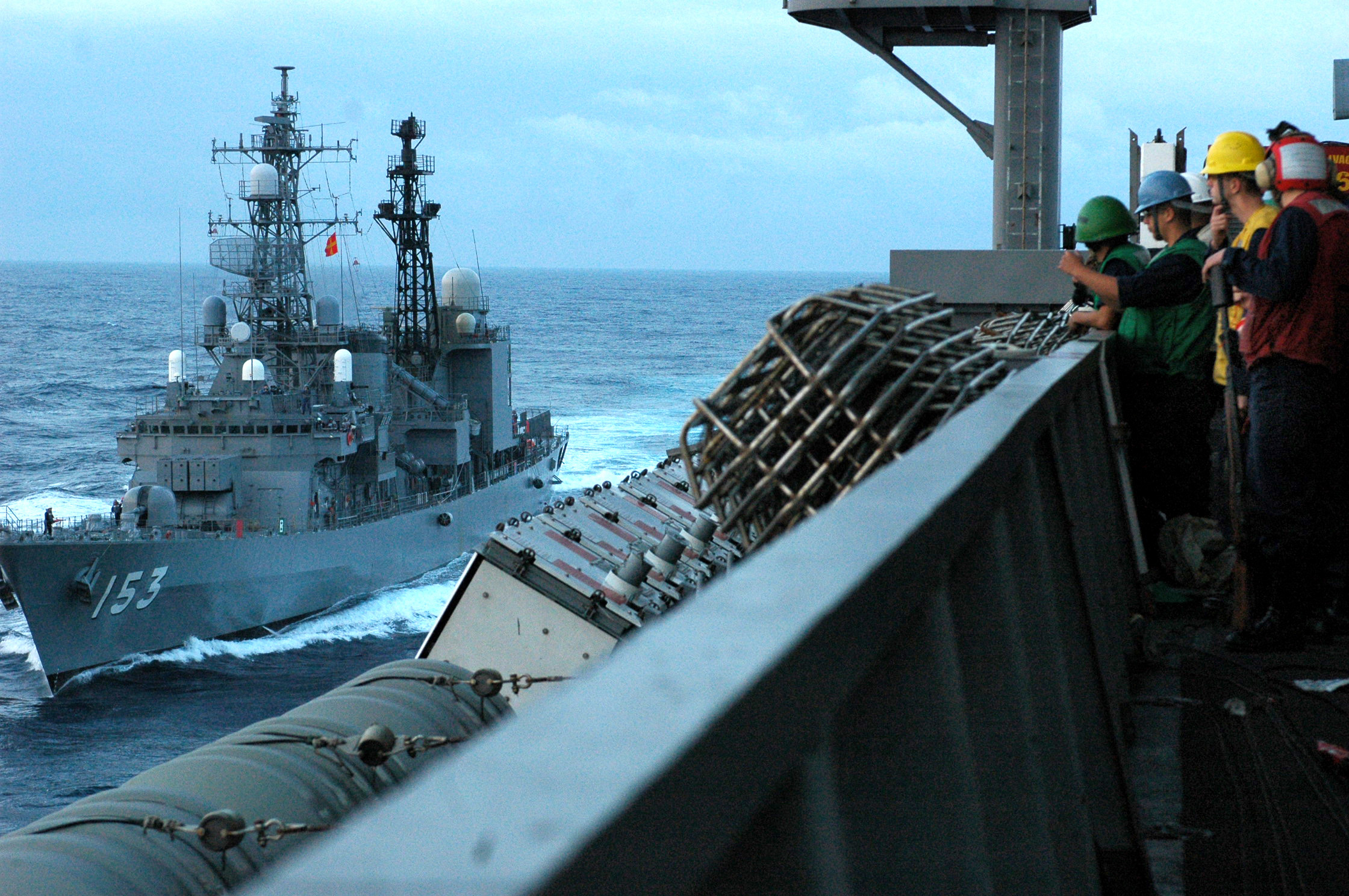
JS Yūgiri alongside USS Ronald Reagan on 17 March 2007.

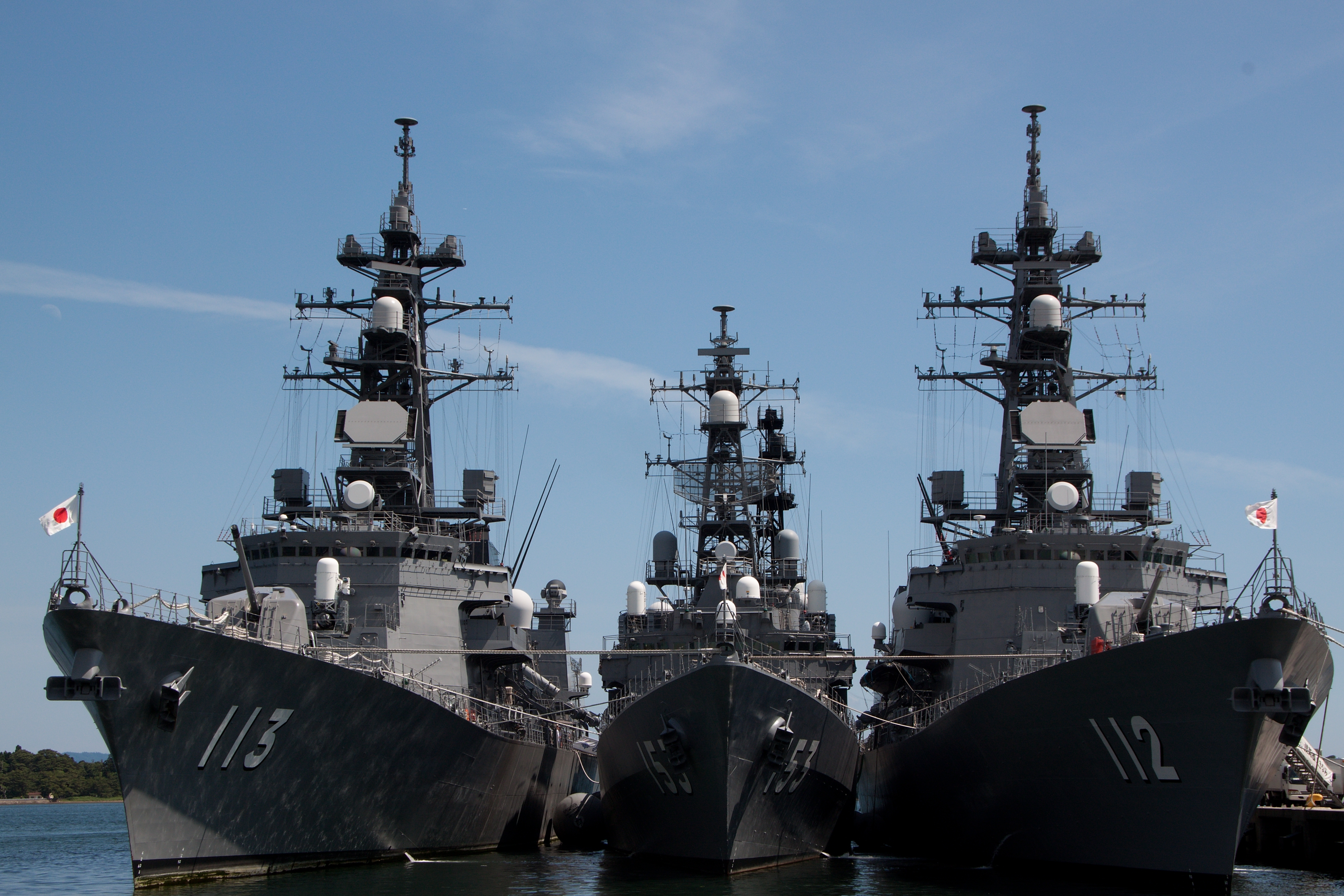
JS Sazanami, JS Yūgiri, and JS Makinami at Ōminato, 26 July 2012.

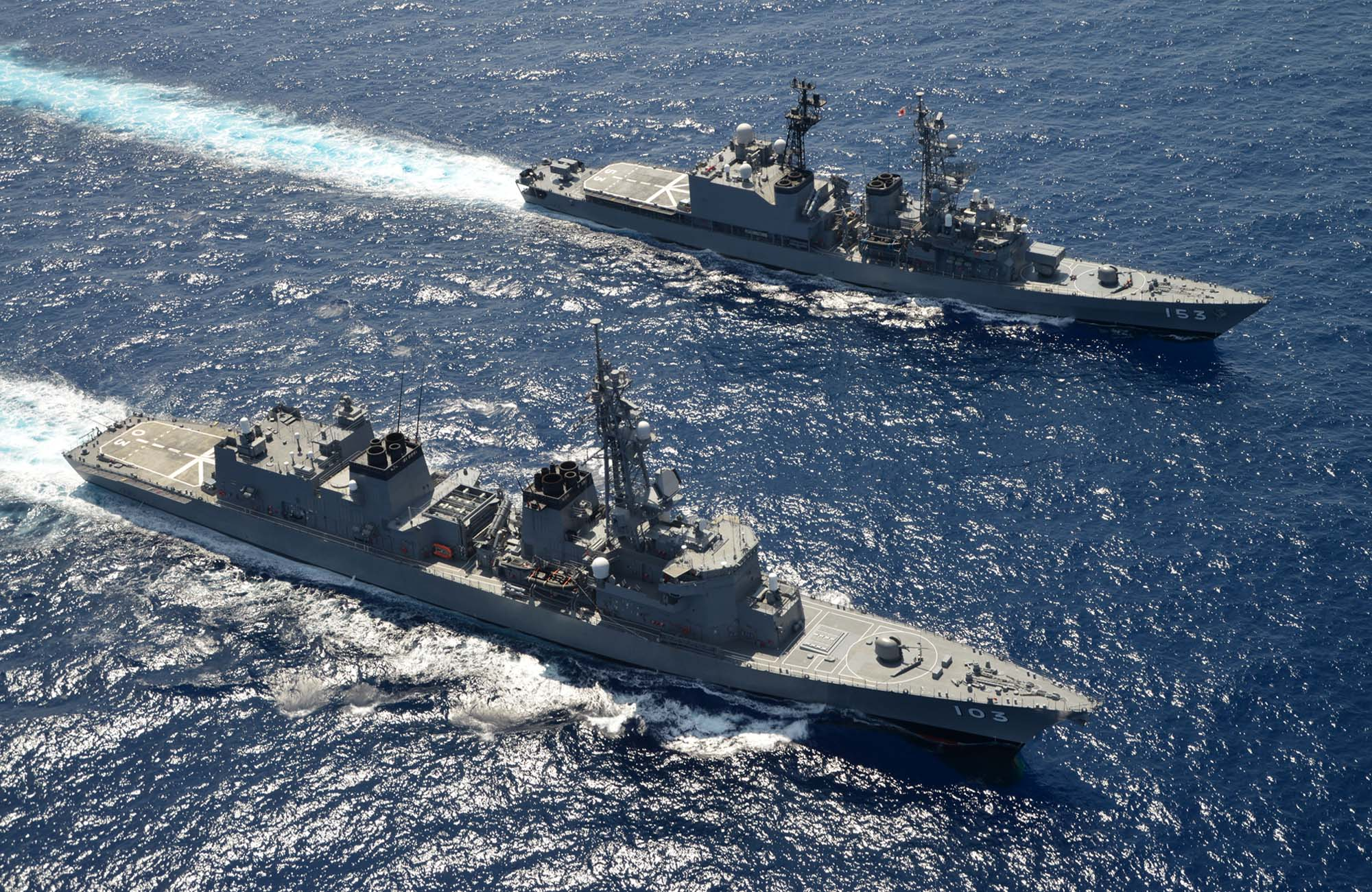
JS Yūgiri alongside JS Yūdachi in March 2016.

JS Yūgiri alongside JS Yūdachi at Manila on 31 July 2016.

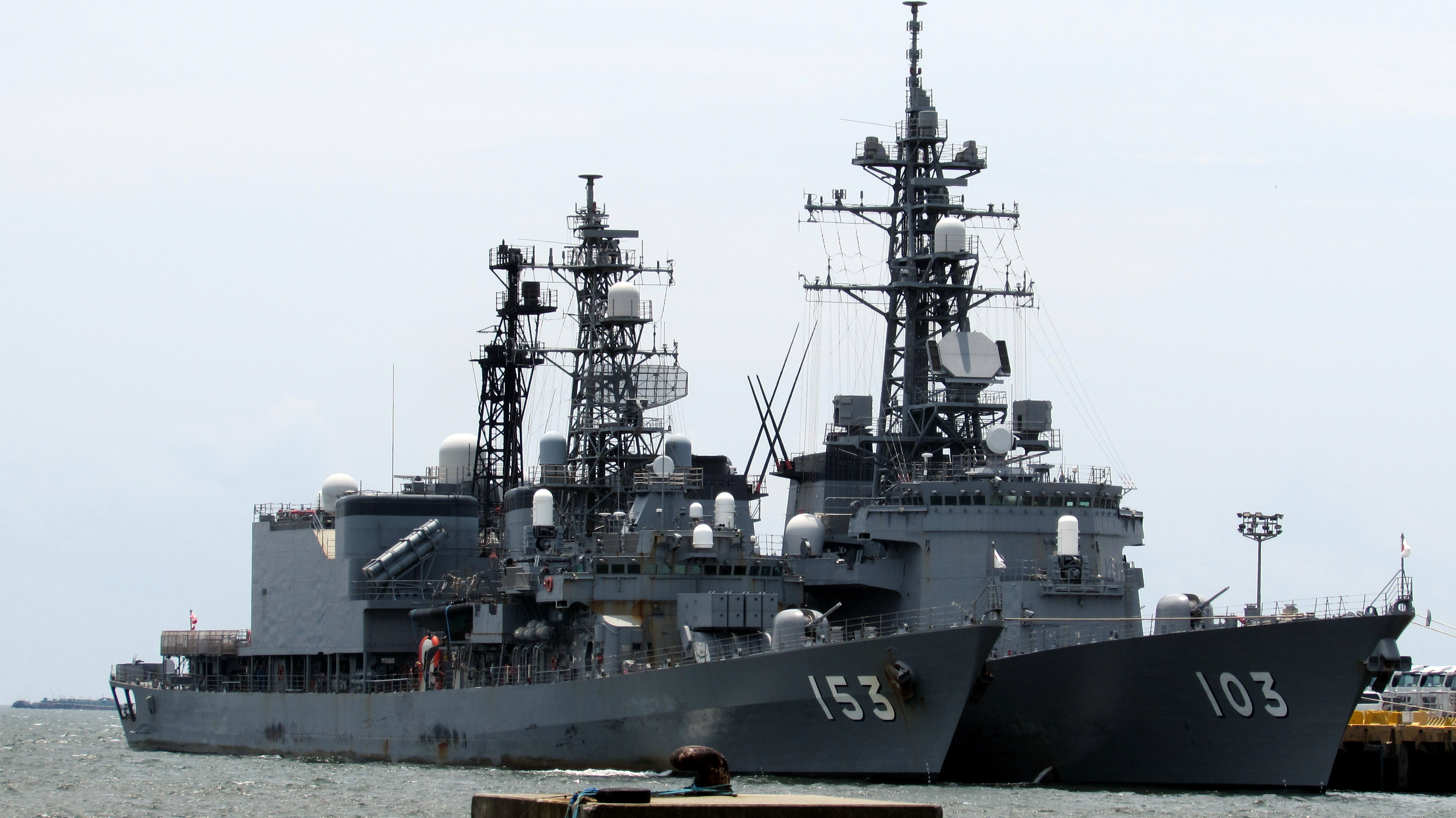
JS Yūgiri alongside JS Yūdachi on 31 August 2016.

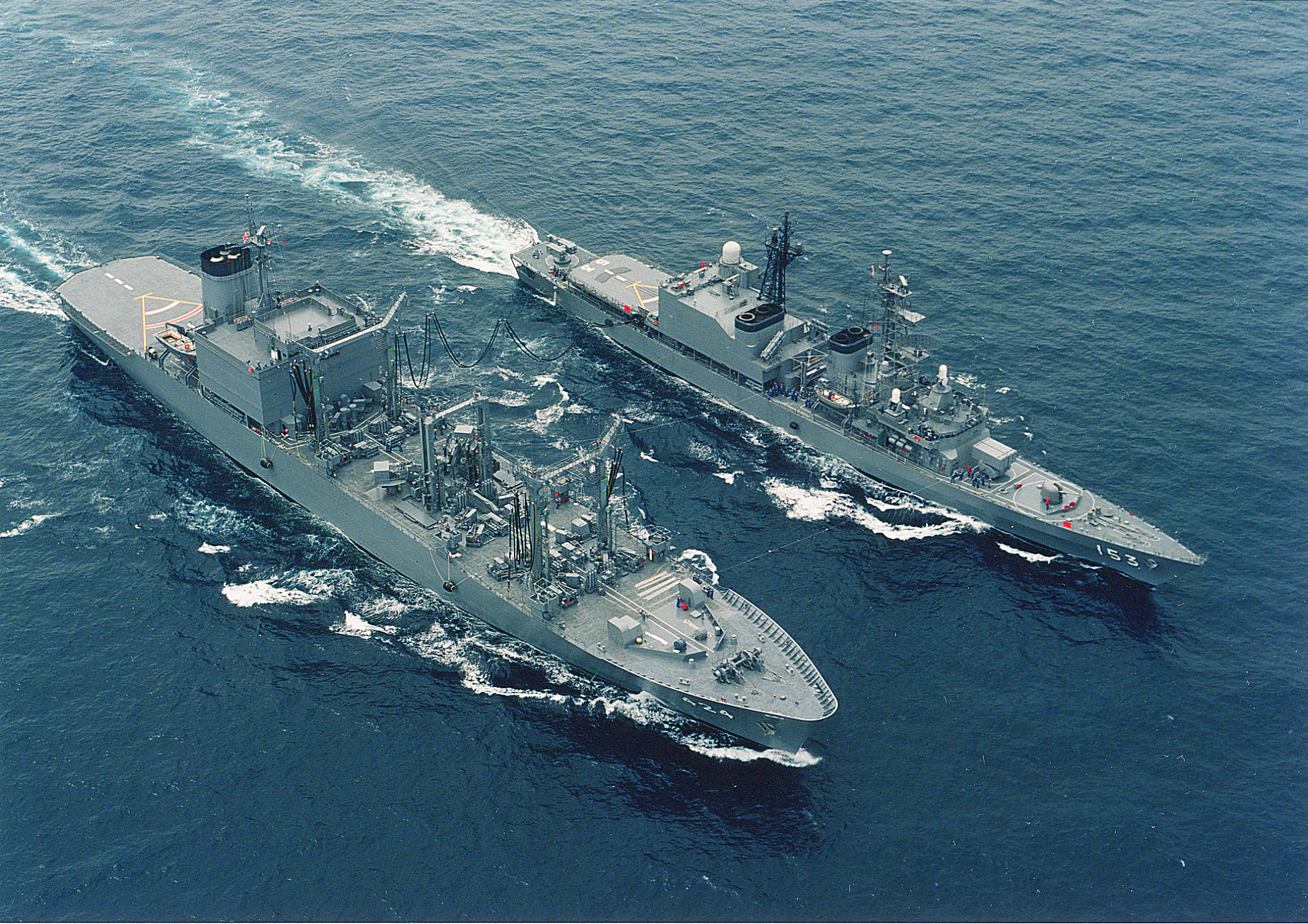
JS Yūgiri being replenished by JS Hamana, 11 March 2021.

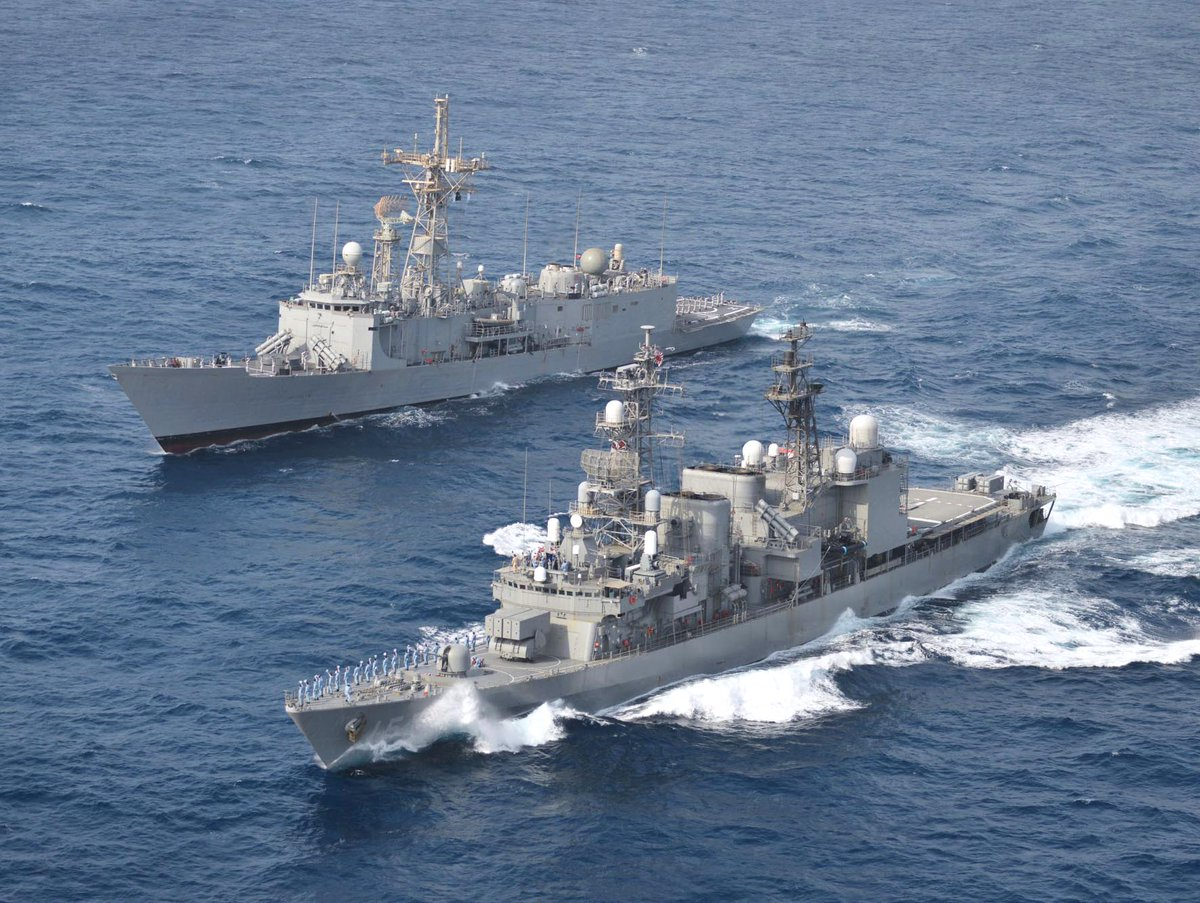
JS Yūgiri sails with PNS Alamgir, 10 July 2021

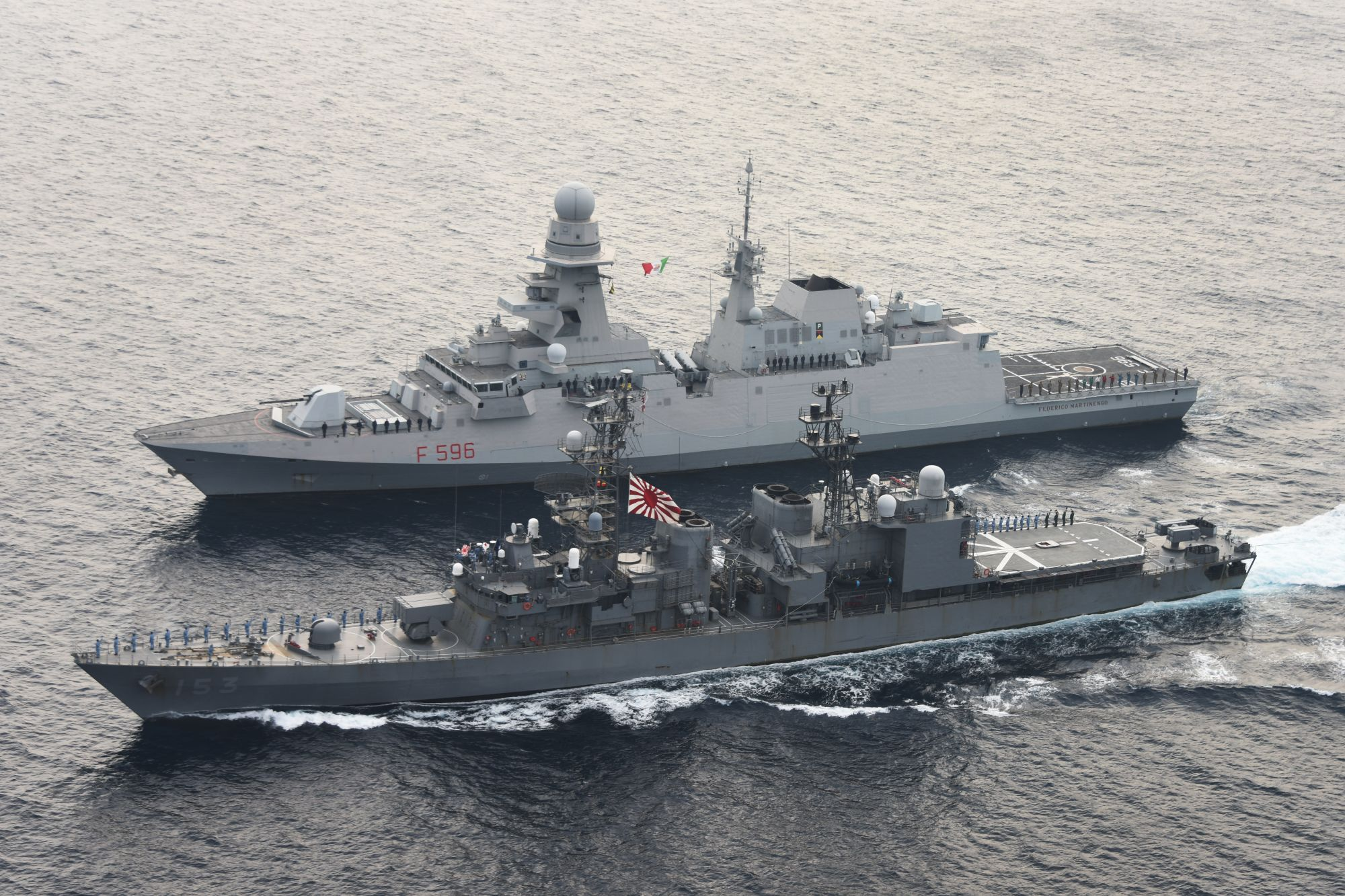
JS Yūgiri sails with Italian frigate Federico Martinengo, 14 September 2021.

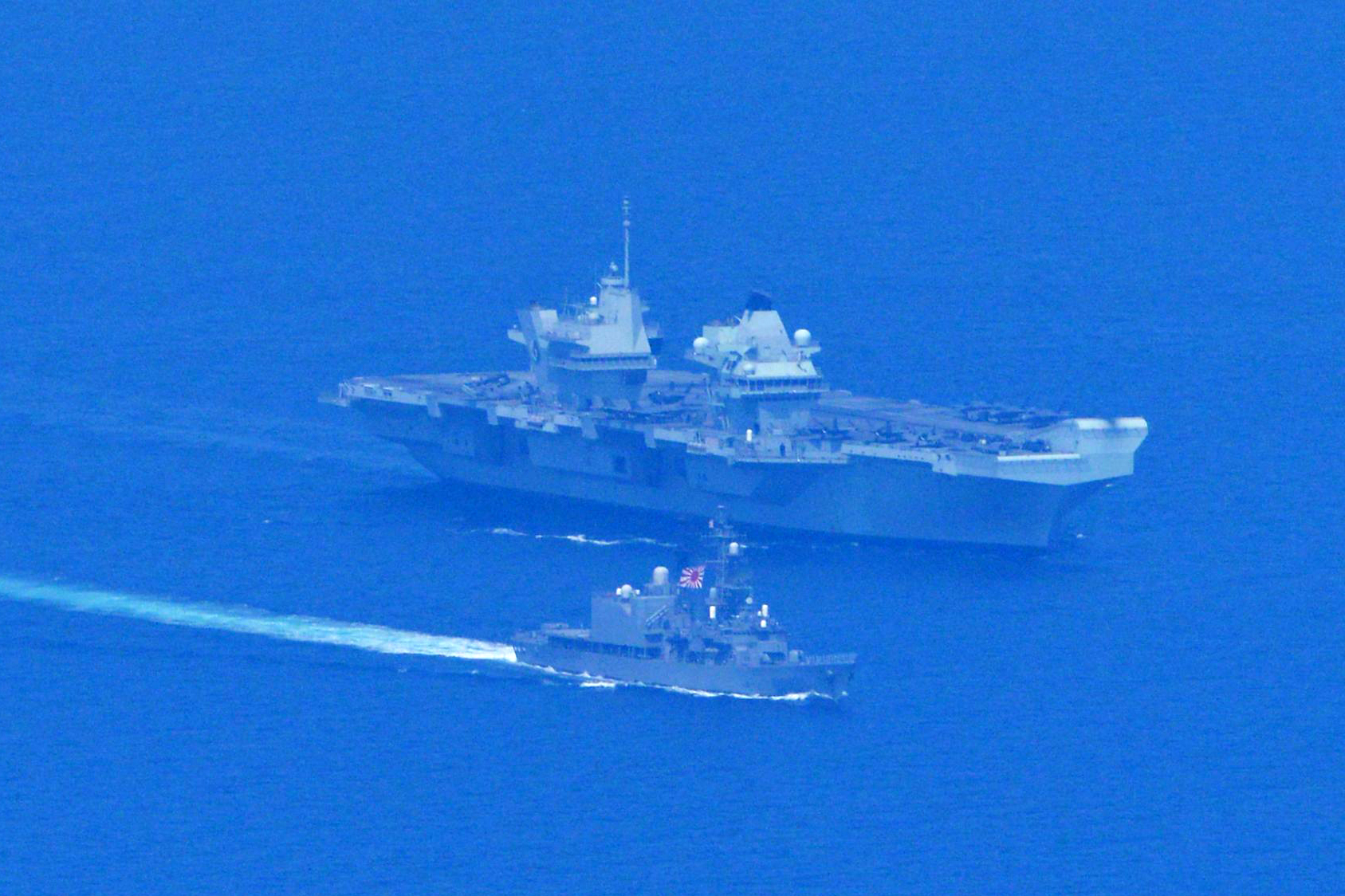
JS Yūgiri with HMS Queen Elizabeth, 11 November 2021.
