= V Air =

Low-cost airline of Taiwan (2014–2016)

V Air 威航 Wēi Háng
IATA	ICAO	Call sign
ZV	VAX	VANTAGE
- Founded: 20 January 2014
- Commenced operations: 17 December 2014
- Ceased operations: 1 October 2016
- Operating bases: Taoyuan International Airport
- Frequent-flyer program: Legend Flight Club
- Fleet size: 4
- Destinations: 12
- Parent company: TransAsia Airways
- Headquarters: Datong, Taipei, Taiwan
- Key people: Vincent M. Lin (Chairman); Eleni Lung (CEO); Bernard Hsu (CCO); Michael Coltman (COO)

V Air (Chinese: 威航) was a short-lived Taiwanese low-cost airline based in Taipei active from 2014 through 2016. It was a franchise subsidiary of TransAsia Airways serving flights to Japan, South Korea, Thailand and Cambodia from its base at Taoyuan International Airport.

== History ==
On 24 March 2014, V Air announced that its corporate identity would be the Formosan black bear. The airline commenced services on 17 December 2014 with its maiden flight from Taipei to Bangkok, Thailand. On 7 January 2015, a second route, to Chiang Mai, Thailand, was launched. On 10 April 2015, V air opened its third scheduled flight route to Macau. The airline also flew from Taipei to Manila, Philippines, but the service was soon discontinued due to strong competition on the Taipei - Manila sector. V Air offered Taiwanese cuisine and beverage for sale on its flights. Its aircraft were in an all-economy seating layout with a seat pitch of 32 inches (81 cm).

Citing harsh competition and a revamped business model, V Air announced in August 2016 that it would cease all operations on 1 October 2016 and be folded back to its parent company TransAsia Airways, which itself declared bankruptcy 1 month later.

== Destinations ==
During its four-year existence, V Air flew to the following destinations:

Country	City	Airport	Notes
Cambodia	Siem Reap	Siem Reap International Airport	Charter
Japan	Fukuoka	Fukuoka Airport	
Japan	Nagoya	Chubu Centrair International Airport	
Japan	Naha	Naha Airport	
Japan	Omitama	Ibaraki Airport	
Japan	Osaka	Kansai International Airport	
Japan	Tokyo	Haneda Airport	
Philippines	Manila	Ninoy Aquino International Airport	
South Korea	Busan	Gimhae International Airport	
Taiwan	Taipei	Taoyuan International Airport	Base
Thailand	Bangkok	Don Mueang International Airport	
Thailand	Chiang Mai	Chiang Mai International Airport	

== Fleet ==
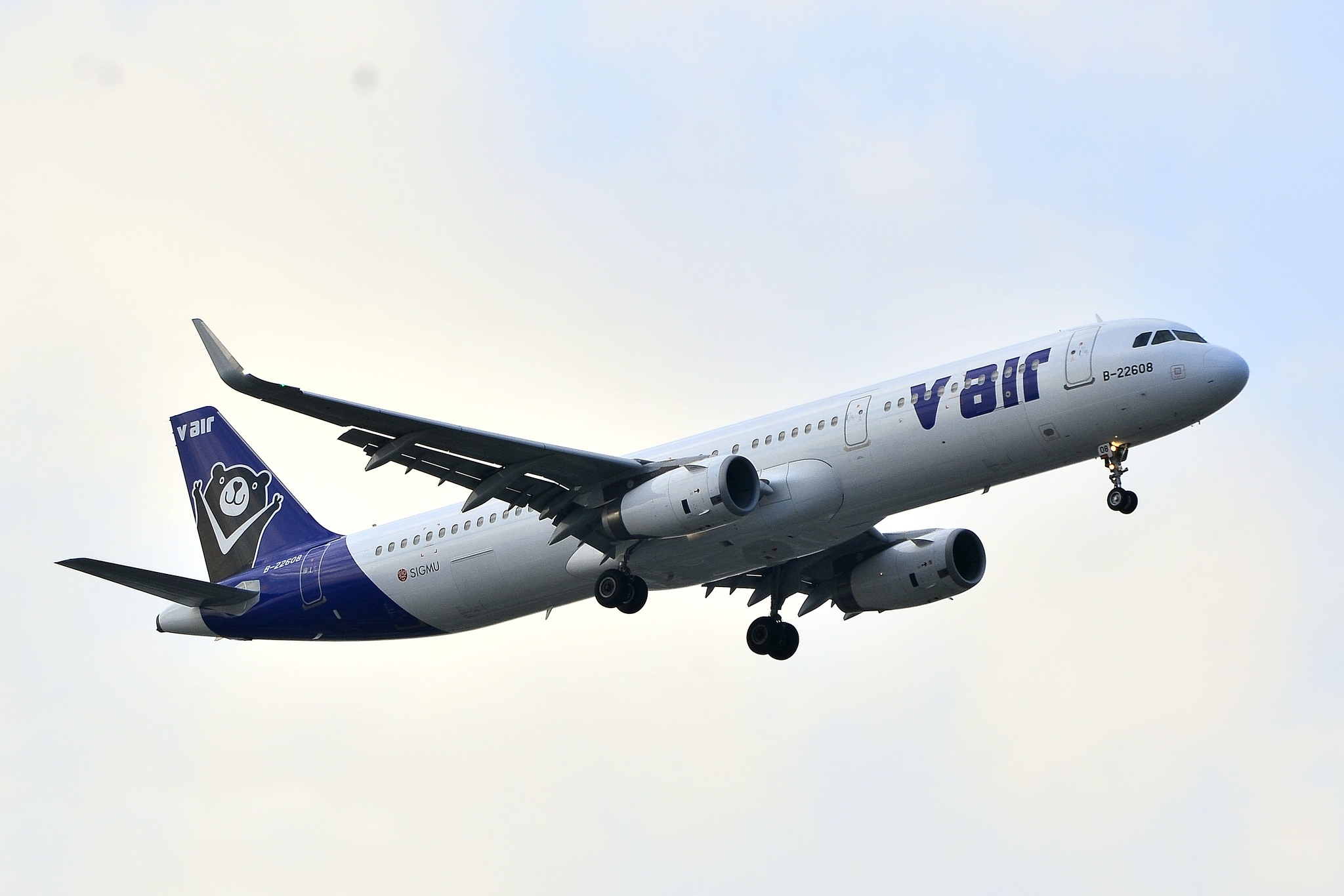
V Air Airbus A321-200

At the time the airline ceased operations, the V Air fleet consisted of the following aircraft:

V Air Fleet
Aircraft	In service	Passengers	Notes
Airbus A320-200	2	180	
Airbus A321-200	2	194	
Total	4		
