= EcoDemonstrator =

Technology research program to improve the ecological footprint of airliners

ecoDemonstrator Program
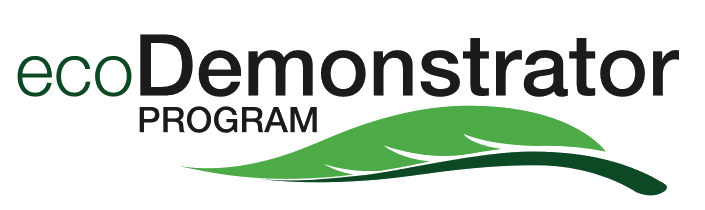

General information
- Project for: Improved fuel economy and ecological footprint Reduced noise

History
- Initiated: 2011
- Predecessors: Quiet Technology Demonstrator
- Successors: ecoDemonstrator Explorer

The ecoDemonstrator Program is a Boeing flight test research program, which has used a series of specially modified aircraft to develop and test aviation technologies designed to improve fuel economy and reduce the noise and ecological footprint of airliners.

Starting in 2012, several aircraft have tested a total of over 250 technologies as of 2024; half remain in further development, but nearly a third have been implemented commercially, such as iPad apps for pilot real-time information to reduce fuel use and emissions; custom approach paths to reduce community noise; and cameras for ground navigation and collision avoidance.

Boeing's named airliner technology programs started in 2001 with the Quiet Technology Demonstrator, and have continued, through the ecoDemonstrator, to the ecoDemonstrator Explorer program announced in 2023.

== Quiet Technology Demonstrator program ==
The ecoDemonstrator program followed the joint Rolls-Royce and Boeing Quiet Technology Demonstrator (QTD) program, which ran in 2001, 2005 and 2018 to develop a quieter engine using chevrons on the rear of the nacelle and exhaust nozzles, as well as an acoustically enhanced inlet liner. In 2001 an American Airlines Boeing 777-200ER with Rolls-Royce Trent 800 engines was used for the flight tests. Much testing was carried out at Glasgow Industrial Airport, Montana, the airport of Boeing's subsidiary, Montana Aviation Research Company (MARCO). The tests were successful, demonstrating better noise reduction than predicted and leading to redesign of wing leading edge de-icing holes to eliminate whistling, a modification which was immediately applied on the 777 production line. Once the QTD2 program began, this program started to be referred to as QTD1.

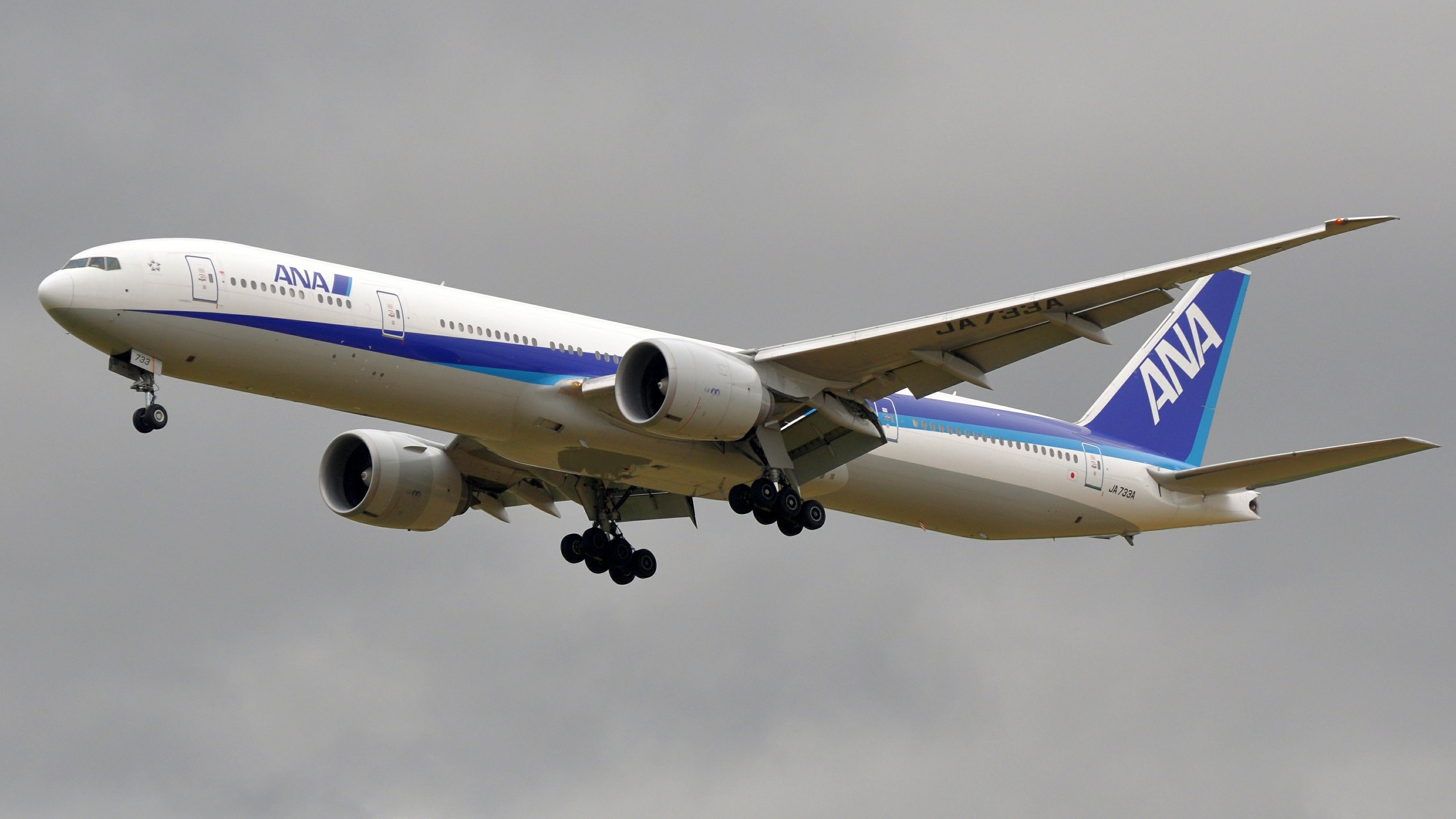
QTD2 went on to fly with All Nippon Airways as JA733A

The resulting design changes were demonstrated in the 2005 Quiet Technology Demonstrator Two (QTD2) program in which a new Boeing 777-300ER, fitted with General Electric GE90-115B engines, was used for a three-week trial, again mainly at Boeing's flight test centre at Glasgow Industrial Airport. As well as the modifications, the aircraft was equipped with extensive sound measurement equipment, and microphone arrays were laid out around the airfield. The chevrons have since been adopted on the Boeing 737 MAX series, 747-8 and 787 Dreamliner aircraft. Also tested on the QTD2 were streamlined toboggan fairings on the main landing gear to reduce noise.

In 2018 a new design of engine inlet liner was flight tested in a successor program, Quiet Technology Demonstrator 3 (QTD3), using acoustic arrays at Moses Lake, Washington. The NASA-designed inlet was installed in the right-hand nacelle of one of Boeing's two 737 MAX 7 prototypes, powered by CFM International LEAP 1B engines. The testing took place between July 27 and August 6.

=== QTD aircraft summary ===
Year	Program	Aircraft	Previously	Registration	Livery	Fate
2001	QTD (QTD1)	Boeing 777-200ER	New	N757AN	American Airlines	Delivered to American Airlines
2005	QTD2	Boeing 777-300ER	New	N5014K	All Nippon Airways (ANA)	Delivered to ANA as JA733A
2018	QTD3	Boeing 737 MAX 7	Boeing	N7201S	Boeing house colors	Returned to Boeing

== ecoDemonstrator program ==
The ecoDemonstrator program was formally launched in 2011, in partnership with American Airlines and the FAA. The first ecoDemonstrator aircraft, a Boeing 737-800, operated during 2012. Since then a different aircraft has been used each year, excepting 2013 and 2017 and a single aircraft from 2022 to 2024, with testing operations lasting from a few weeks to over six months. The testing is usually done in collaboration with many industry partners, including NASA, the FAA, airlines, makers of engines, equipment and software, and academic institutions. The results of the tests are rarely publicised, respecting the confidentiality of the industrial partners. As of 2024 the program has tested over 250 technologies, of which 28% have been implemented, 52% are still under development, and 20% "provided helpful learnings" and were abandoned.

The 2022-4 aircraft, the ninth in the program, wore a special 10th anniversary livery.

=== Participating aircraft ===
==== 2012: Boeing 737-800 ====
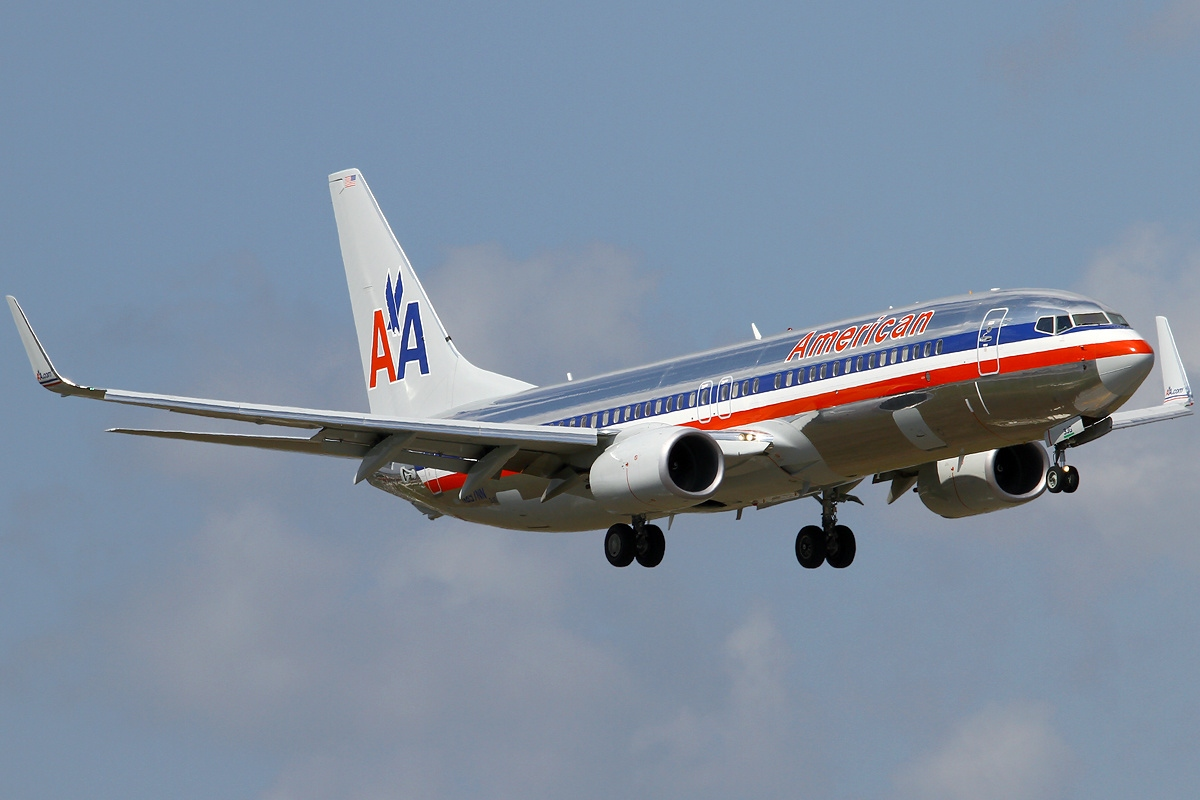
American Airlines Boeing 737-800 N897NN soon after its use as the first ecoDemonstrator

This was a new aircraft destined for American Airlines and in their livery. With this, the first ecoDemonstrator, Boeing tested laminar flow technology for winglets, improving fuel efficiency by 1.8 percent. This fed directly into the design of the winglets used on the subsequent 737 MAX series. The aircraft tested other technologies, including:

- variable area fan nozzle to optimize engine efficiency
- regenerative hydrogen fuel cell for aircraft electrical power
- adaptive outer wing trailing edges for greater take-off lift and decreased drag in cruise
- active engine vibration control
- flightpath optimization for operational efficiency
- carpet made from recycled materials
- sustainable aviation fuel (SAF).

==== 2014: Boeing 787-8 ====
The fourth production 787, a Boeing test airframe, was employed as the second ecoDemonstrator. It conducted 35 projects including:

- use of a 15% blend of SAF by both engines for nine flights
- acoustic ceramic matrix composite nozzle for weight and noise reduction
- aerodynamic and flight control improvements.
- advanced wing coatings to reduce ice accumulation.
- software applications and connectivity technologies that can improve flight planning, fuel-load optimization, in-flight routing, and landing.
- touchscreen displays on the flight deck.
- wireless sensors to reduce wiring, reduce weight and save fuel.
- outer wing access doors made from recycled 787 carbon fibre.
- development of the Airborne Spacing for Terminal Arrival Routes (ASTAR) system to reduce spacing between aircraft on approach to airports.

==== 2015: Boeing 757-200 ====
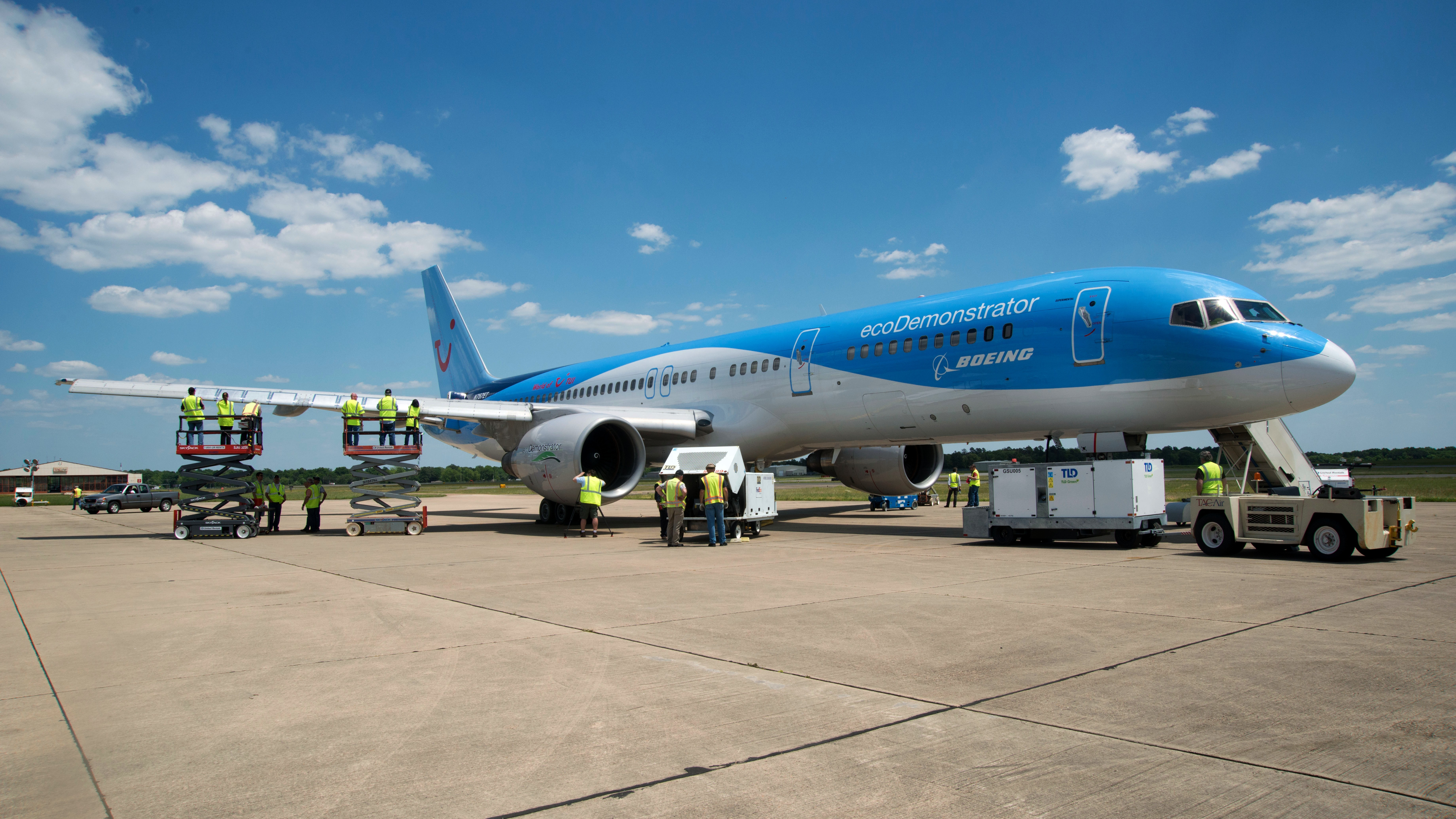
Boeing 757-200 N757ET being inspected for insect debris by NASA researchers

This aircraft served with United Airlines for 23 years before being used by Boeing for the ecoDemonstrator program. The aircraft was painted in the TUI Group livery as a mark of their collaboration in the project, particularly in the environmental efficiency aspects. NASA's Langley Research Center was also a major participant as part of its Environmentally Responsible Aviation (ERA) project. At the end of the testing period the aircraft was, in conjunction with the Aircraft Fleet Recycling Association and the aircraft lessor Stifel, disassembled for recycling. Around 90% of materials were reused or recycled.

Among the 20 technologies explored were:

- improvement of airflow with insect shields and anti-bug coatings on one wing
- active flow control over the vertical tail with the aim of increasing efficiency and reducing its size
- cabin food cart that converts to a waste cart
- green diesel fuel testing.

==== 2016: Embraer E170 ====
The third E170 prototype first flew in 2002 and was retained by Embraer as a test and demonstration aircraft. It was the only non-Boeing aircraft so far to participate as an ecoDemonstrator. Testing projects included:

- use of LIDAR to complement existing air data sensors
- ice-phobic paint to reduce icing and insect debris buildup
- new noise-reducing flaps
- special sensors to investigate airflow and improve aerodynamics
- use of 10% Brazil-produced bio-fuel and 90% standard kerosene.

==== 2018: Boeing 777F ====
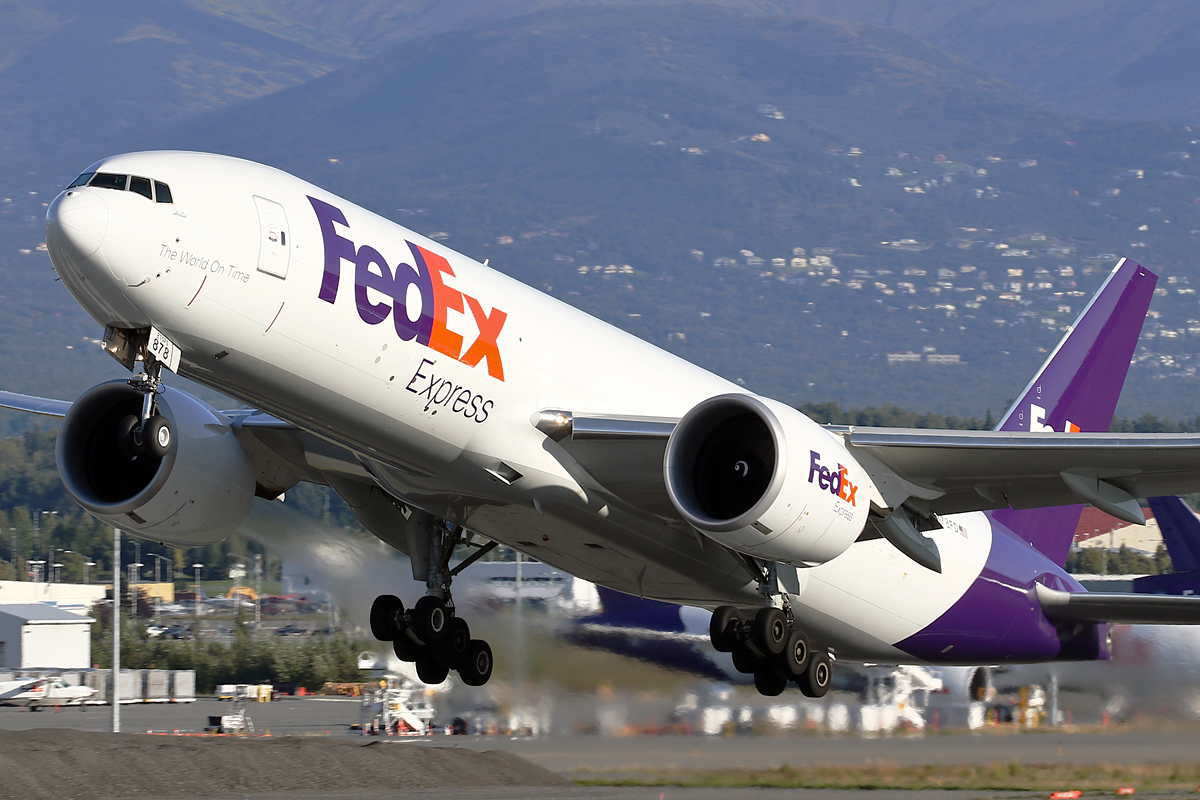
FedEx Boeing 777F N878FD after its use as an ecoDemonstrator

FedEx supplied a newly delivered 777 freighter for use in the ecoDemonstrator program. After two months of conversion, it was used in the testing program for around three months before restoration to its freighter role. Technologies explored included:

- smaller, lighter weight thrust reverser
- Safran electrical power distribution system
- use of 100% biofuel – the first commercial airliner to be entirely powered by SAF. The engines were not modified in any way
- 3D printed titanium tail fin cap using waste material and reducing the weight
- synthetic ILS using GPS giving increased reliability and potentially allowing reduced separation of aircraft on approach
- wake riding, involving flying closely behind another aircraft to give a fuel efficiency increase of up to 10%
- LIDAR clear-air turbulence detector
- SOCAS – Surface Operations and Collision Avoidance System, merging radar and video images for obstacle detection
- FLYHT Aerospace Solutions’ Automated Flight Information Reporting System (AFIRS) for tracking, distress and data-streaming from flight data recorders.

==== 2019: Boeing 777-200 ====
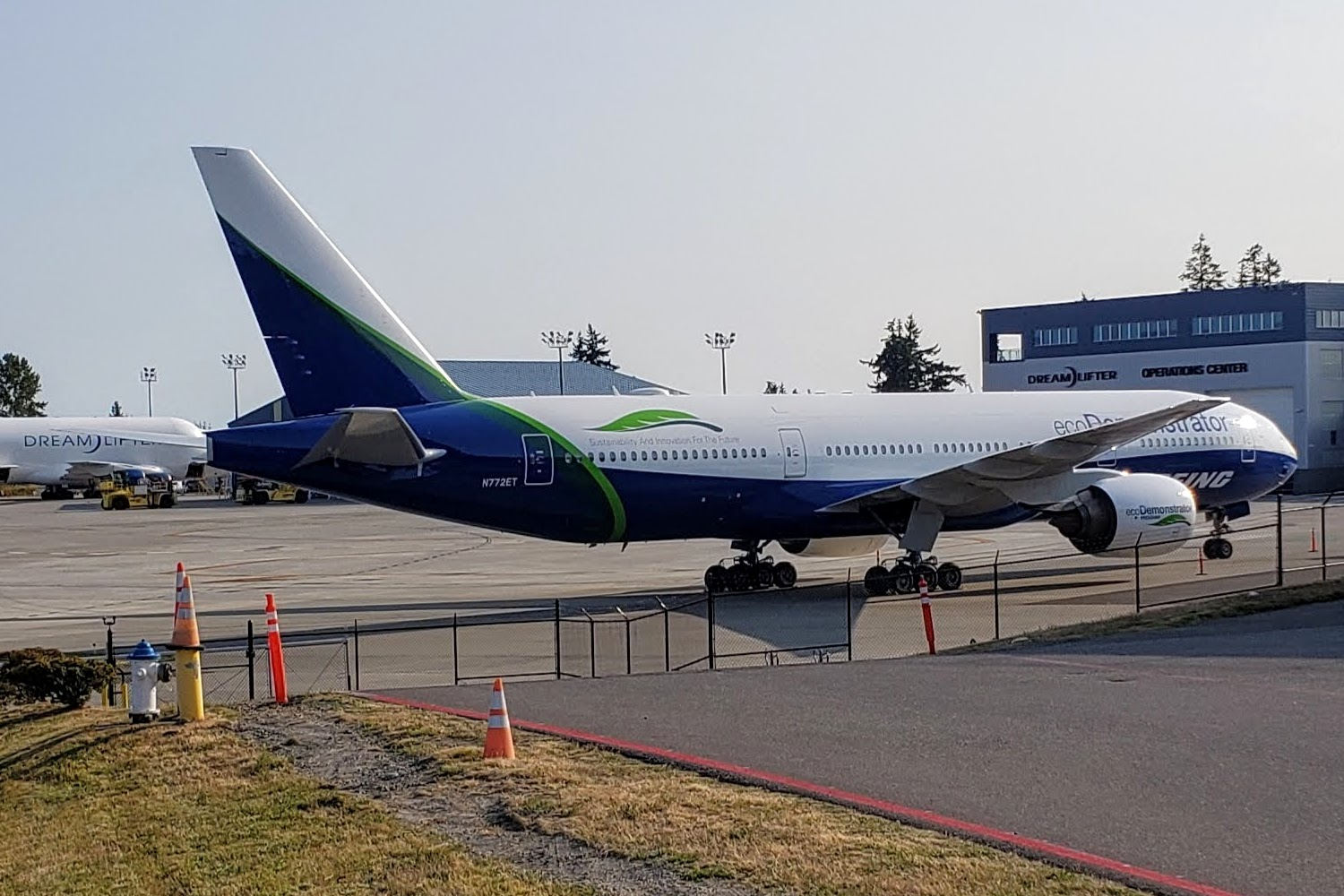
Boeing 777-200 N772ET in the 2019 ecoDemonstrator livery at the Future of Flight Museum in Everett, WA

This airliner had served Air China since 2001 before Boeing purchased it to join the ecoDemonstrator program. During testing, the aircraft visited Frankfurt, Germany, as several experiments were sponsored by German organisations including the German Aerospace Center (DLR), Diehl Aerospace, and Fraport. Among the 50 projects trialled were:

- recyclable cabin carpet tiles
- moisture-absorbent toilet floor made from recycled carbon fibre
- chromate-free primer for aluminium parts to reduce manufacturing health risks
- sharing digital information between air traffic control (ATC), the flight deck and an airline's operations center to optimize routing efficiency and safety
- a connected electronic flight bag (EFB) application to provide re-routing information
- connected galleys, lavatories, and cabin temperature and humidity sensors
- cameras for an outside view for passengers.

==== 2020: Boeing 787-10 ====
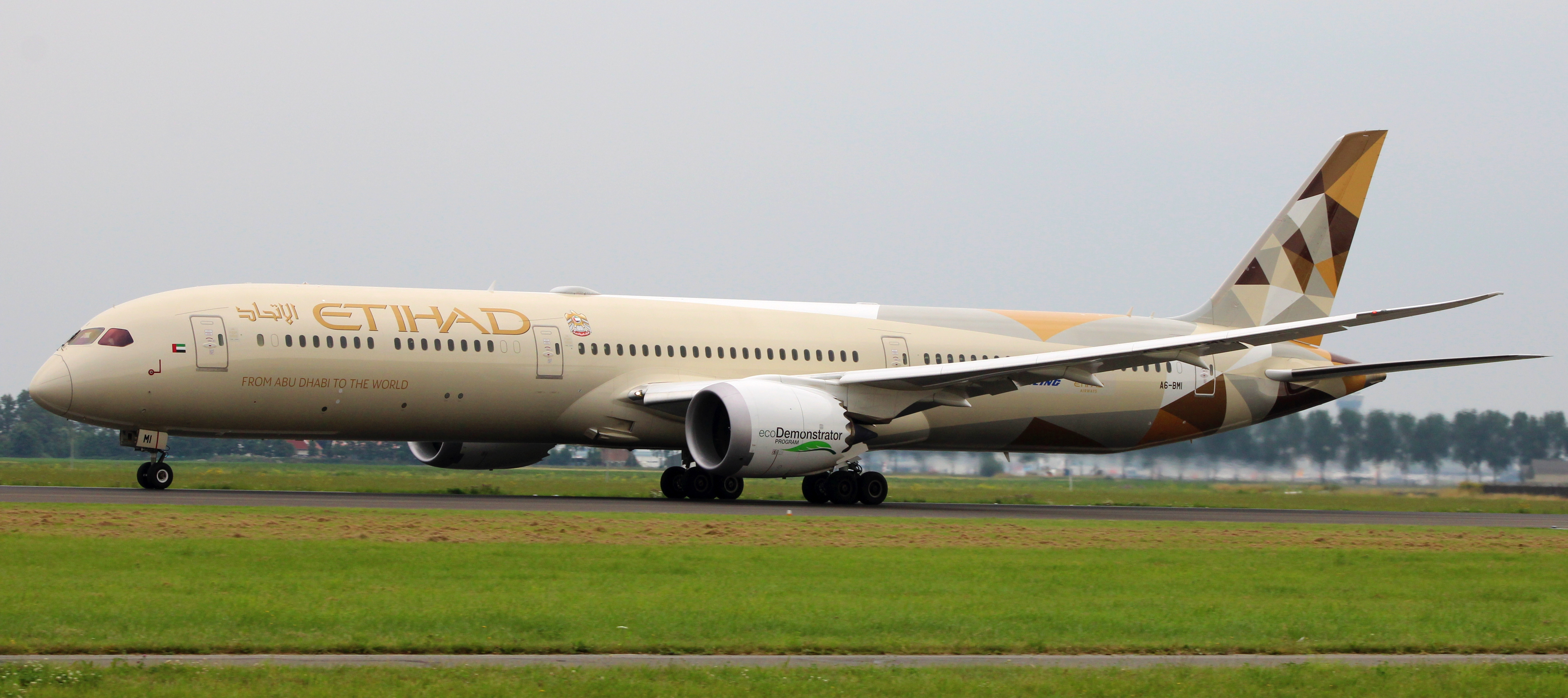
Etihad 787-10 A6-BMI in 2021, after being the 2020 ecoDemonstrator

This new aircraft for Etihad Airways was used for just a few weeks between August and September 2020, with testing mainly carried out at Boeing's Glasgow Industrial Airport, Montana. The program included:

- noise measurement with over 1400 sensors for internal and external measurements
- noise reduction including Safran undercarriage modifications
- SAF testing with blends of 30% to 50%
- sanitisation methods for the COVID-19 pandemic.
- digital text-based ATC routing communications.

==== 2021: Boeing 737 MAX 9 ====
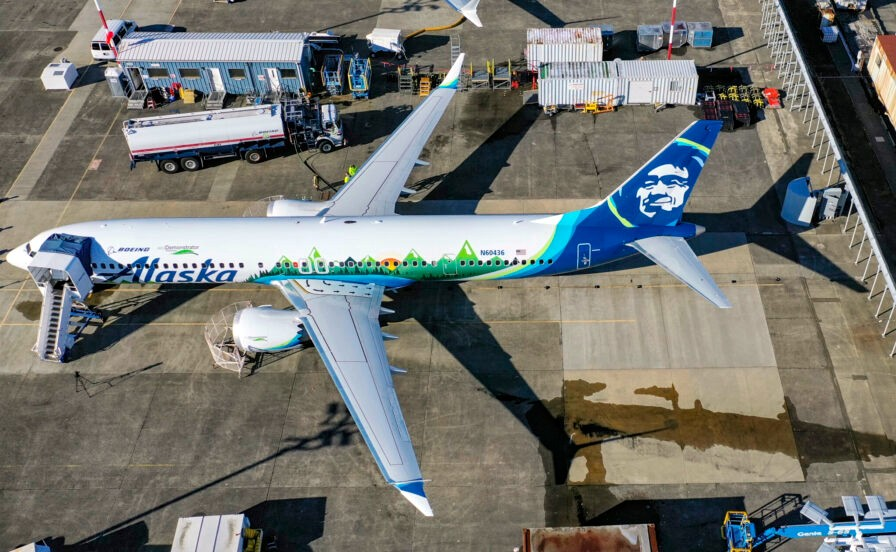
Boeing 737 MAX 9 ecoDemonstrator in its special Alaska Airlines livery

This 5-month program was conducted with a new airframe originally destined for Corendon Dutch Airlines but was painted in a special Alaska Airlines livery with ecoDemonstrator stickers. In October 2021 the aircraft flew from Seattle to Glasgow, Scotland, for the United Nations COP26 Climate Change Conference, bringing executives from Boeing and Alaska Airlines and fuelled by a 50% SAF fuel blend. The testing program included:

- low profile anti-collision light for weight and drag reduction and increased visibility
- modernised ATC communications including the Inmarsat IRIS satellite communications system
- halon-free fire extinguishing (ground testing only)
- noise reduction engine nacelles including testing at Glasgow Industrial Airport, Montana
- cabin walls made from recycled material
- 50% SAF blend
- atmospheric greenhouse gas measurement system integration for airliners
- passenger air vent designs to create an air curtain between seat rows.

==== 2022: Boeing 777-200ER ====
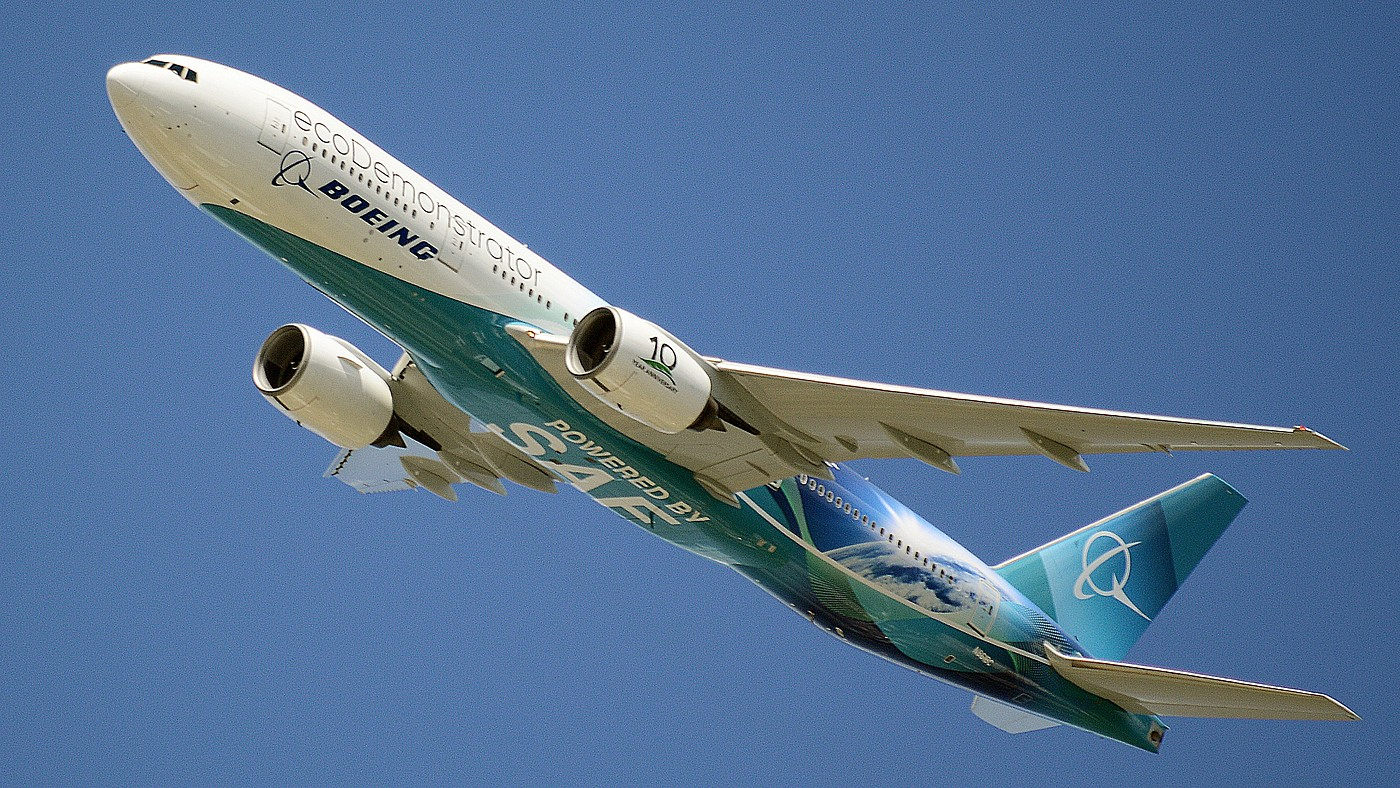
Boeing 777-200ER ecoDemonstrator N861BC at EAA AirVenture Oshkosh in 2022

The aircraft was originally delivered to Singapore Airlines in 2002, and flew most recently for Surinam Airways. It wears a livery celebrating the 10th anniversary of the ecoDemonstrator program. Boeing implied that this aircraft will operate as the ecoDemonstrator test aircraft until 2024. The company stated that the six-month 2022 program would demonstrate 30 new technologies, among which were:

- the use of a 30% SAF blend
- disinfection of water from sinks for reuse in toilet flushing
- weight reduction through 3D printed parts
- noise reduction techniques
- vortex generators which retract during cruise
- head-worn head-up display enhanced vision system
- fire-fighting system that does not use Halon
- environmentally-friendly galley cooler refrigerant
- ground measurement of engine particle emissions with different fuel types.

===== 2023 =====
In April 2023, Boeing announced that the 777-200ER would be testing 19 technologies during the year, including:

- cargo hold wall panels made from recycled and sustainable materials
- fibre-optic fuel quantity sensors compatible with SAF
- smart airport maps by Boeing subsidiary Jeppesen for active airport taxiing monitoring for EFBs
- all flights to use SAF in the highest available blend

Between June 25 and 29, 2023, the aircraft operated from London Stansted Airport, performing flights over The Netherlands, Belgium, Germany and the Czech Republic, subsequently returning to its base at Seattle. As of January 2024 no announcement had been made about the purpose of these flights.

In December 2023, in cooperation with Nav Canada, the aircraft taxied from stand to runway at Vancouver International Airport using only digital communications via the EFB, with no voice contact with ATC.

===== 2024 =====
In May 2024, Boeing announced that the aircraft would be flying its program with a 30/70 mix of SAF and conventional fuel, starting later the same month. Among the 36 technologies to be tested would be:

- cabin seat sensors to detect if a passenger leaves their seat during taxiing, takeoff and landing, touchless lavatory and more efficient galleys to increase efficiency and reduce food waste
- single-engine taxiing and digital taxi clearances
- steeper, continuous landing approaches for noise, fuel and emissions reduction
- recyclable, lighter and more durable cabin flooring and ceiling panels
- improved cabin insulation and bulkhead and galley acoustic panels.
- OLED display screens integrated into cabin structure.

Also tested were enhancements of the Jeppesen EFB which included in-flight fuel saving recommendations and prediction of taxi times using historical and real-time data.

In September 2024, Boeing announced that during this round of testing it had performed 85 ground and 15 flight testing hours, testing 10 technologies, and highlighting the fuel and noise reduction benefits of modified approaches, some of which had already been adopted by the ICAO.

On September 9, the aircraft flew from Seattle to Victorville, California.

=== ecoDemonstrator aircraft summary ===
Year	Aircraft	Previously	Registration	Livery	Fate
2012	Boeing 737-800	New	N897NN	American Airlines	Delivered to American Airlines
2014	Boeing 787-8	Boeing	N7874	Boeing house colors	Retained by Boeing. Retired to Pinal Airpark February 11, 2026
2015	Boeing 757-200	United Airlines N506UA	N757ET	TUI	Parted-out at Moses Lake
2016	Embraer E170	Embraer	PP-XJB	Special	Returned to Embraer
2018	Boeing 777F	FedEx Express	N878FD	FedEx	Returned to FedEx Express
2019	Boeing 777-200	Air China B-2068	N772ET	Boeing house colors	Stored at Victorville
2020	Boeing 787-10	New	N8572C	Etihad Airways	Delivered to Etihad Airways as A6-BMI
2021	Boeing 737 MAX 9	New	N60436	Alaska Airlines special	Delivered to Alaska Airlines as N979AK
2022-4	Boeing 777-200ER	Surinam Airways PZ-TCU	N861BC	Special	Stored at Victorville

All aircraft apart from the 2022 777 had ecoDemonstrator stickers applied to the fuselage or engine nacelles, at least one retaining them for some time after its participation in the program ended.

== ecoDemonstrator Explorer program ==
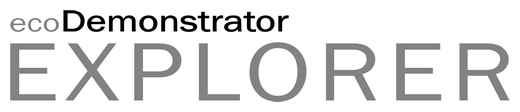

In April 2023 Boeing announced a new program, ecoDemonstrator Explorer, using "platforms that will focus on short-term testing of a specific technology"'.

=== Projects ===
==== First project ====
The first ecoDemonstrator Explorer was a 787-10. using the aircraft's technologies along with coordination with the air navigation service providers (ANSPs) of the US, Japan, Singapore and Thailand to optimise routings for greatest possible efficiency across variables such as weather, air traffic and airspace closures. This is the basis of an international form of trajectory-based operations (TBO), already part of the US FAA's national NextGen project. The ANSPs will coordinate to streamline the flow of traffic through multiple national jurisdictions. The test flights will use the highest available blends of SAF in the process. Boeing expects that the fuel burn could be reduced by up to 10%.

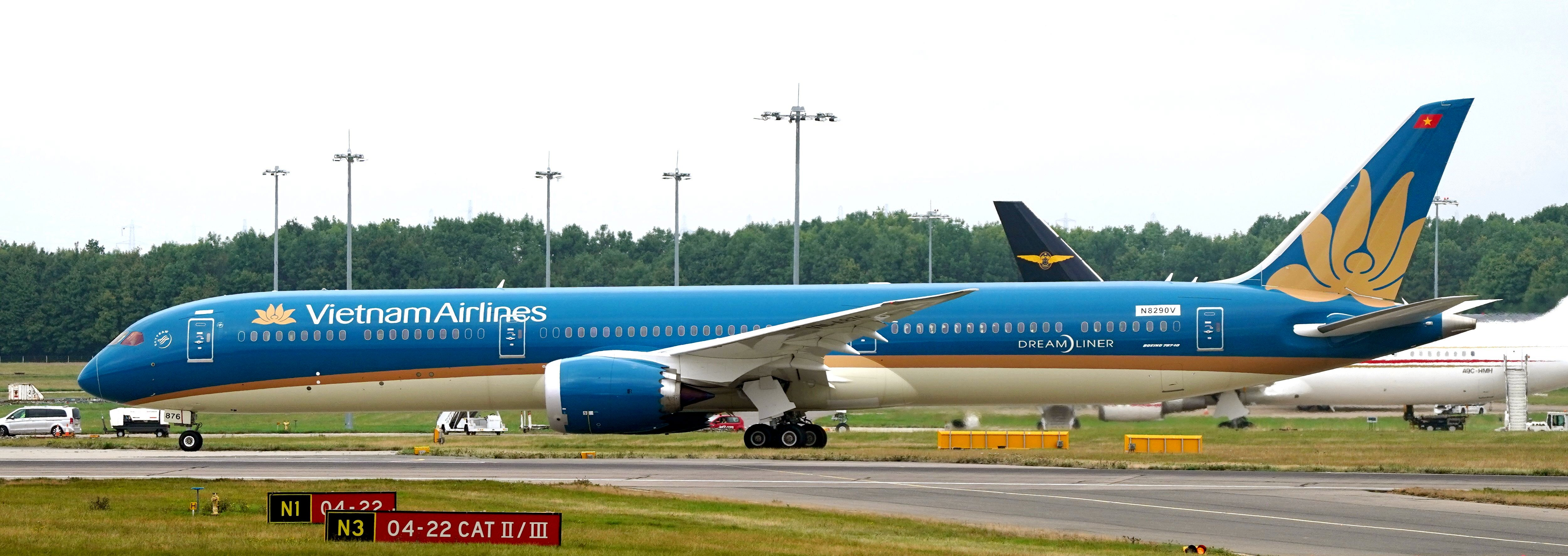
N8290V in Vietnam Airlines livery at London Stansted Airport in 2022

In June 2023 787-10 N8290V (a Boeing test registration) was used for the first Explorer test/demonstration flights. (Note: This aircraft, in full Vietnam Airlines livery, had already been used as a Boeing test aircraft, notably in the UK during 2022. The purpose of the testing was not revealed by Boeing, but was rumoured to be in connection with 5G wireless radio transmissions.) The aircraft, built in 2021 for Vietnam Airlines but not taken up, was unmarked except for basic Boeing logos and “ecoDemonstrator EXPLORER” stickers. It left Seattle on June 11, flying first to Tokyo (Narita). From there it flew to Singapore (Changi) on June 13, then on to Bangkok (Suvarnabhumi) on June 14, and returned direct to Seattle (Everett) on June 16.

The Civil Aviation Authority of Singapore (CAAS) stated that this was part of a three-year programme. Boeing's chief pilot for product development stated that the TBO system, using technologies already in use aboard many modern airliners, allows pilots and air traffic controllers to make trial route change requests to see the cascading effects of the change on their, and other aircraft's flights, all the way through to airport gate availability, to see if they are likely to be approved.

In October 2023 it was announced that the ANSPs of China, Indonesia, Japan, New Zealand, the Philippines, Singapore, Thailand, and the USA would create a Pathfinder project to demonstrate TBO across the region within four years. Separately the ANSPs of Indonesia, New Zealand and Singapore, along with the Civil Air Navigation Services Organisation (CANSO), and IATA agreed to implement within a year a similar Free Route Operations (FRTO) project to provide routings between defined city pairs.

==== Second project ====
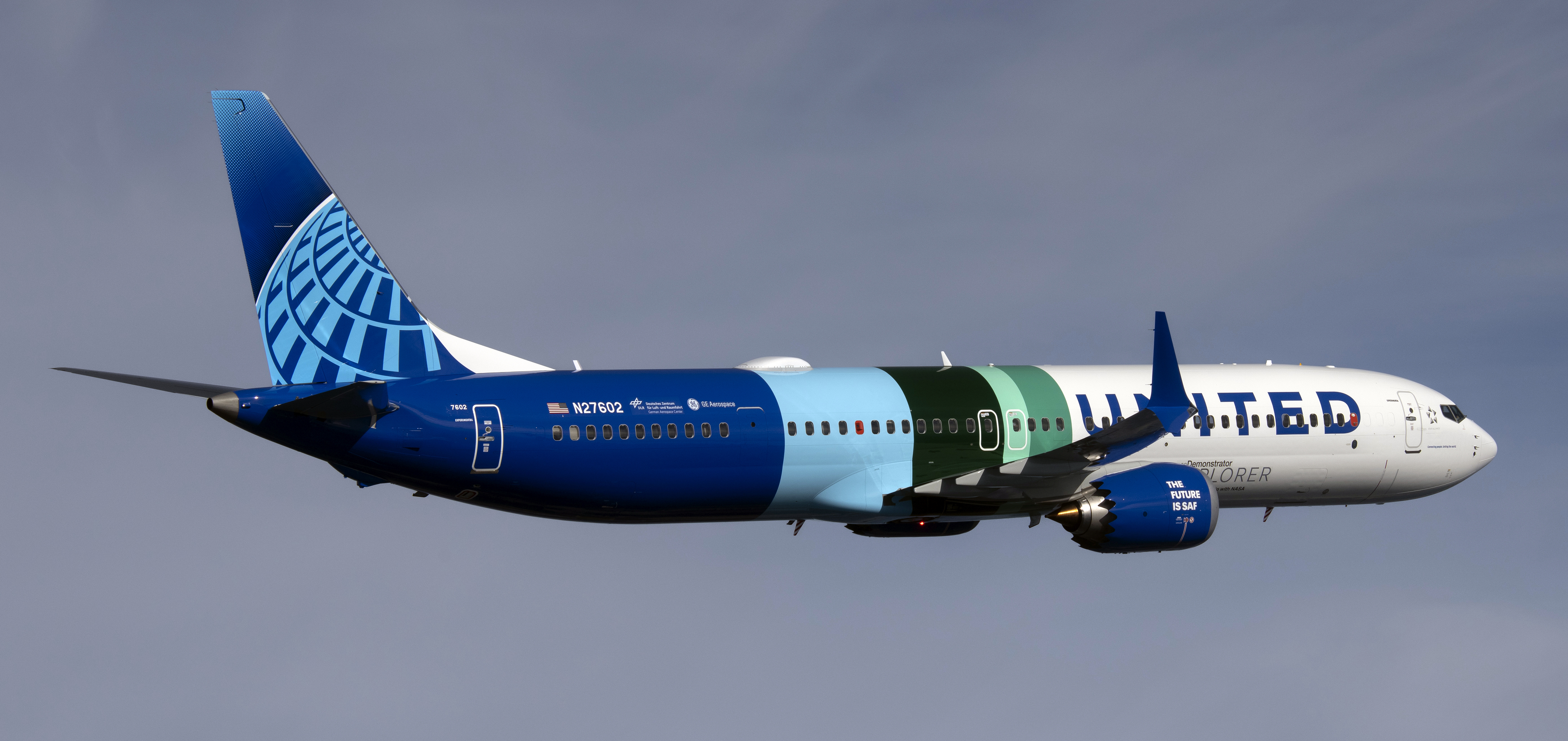
737 MAX 10 ecoDemonstrator Explorer N27602 in its special United Airlines livery

On October 12, 2023, Boeing announced a second ecoDemonstrator Explorer project. It evaluated the environmental characteristics of SAF using a new 737 MAX 10 destined for United Airlines. Registered N27602, it made its first flight on September 14, 2023, and wore a special livery with "ecoDemonstrator EXPLORER" titles and "The Future is SAF" markings on the nacelles. It flew running on SAF from one fuel tank, alternating with conventional fuel from another tank. The emissions from the CFM International LEAP 1B engines were sampled by the NASA Douglas DC-8 Airborne Science Lab, registered N817NA, which flew behind the test aircraft. The characteristics of contrails produced were evaluated. Also collaborating on the project are the FAA, GE Aerospace, and the DLR.

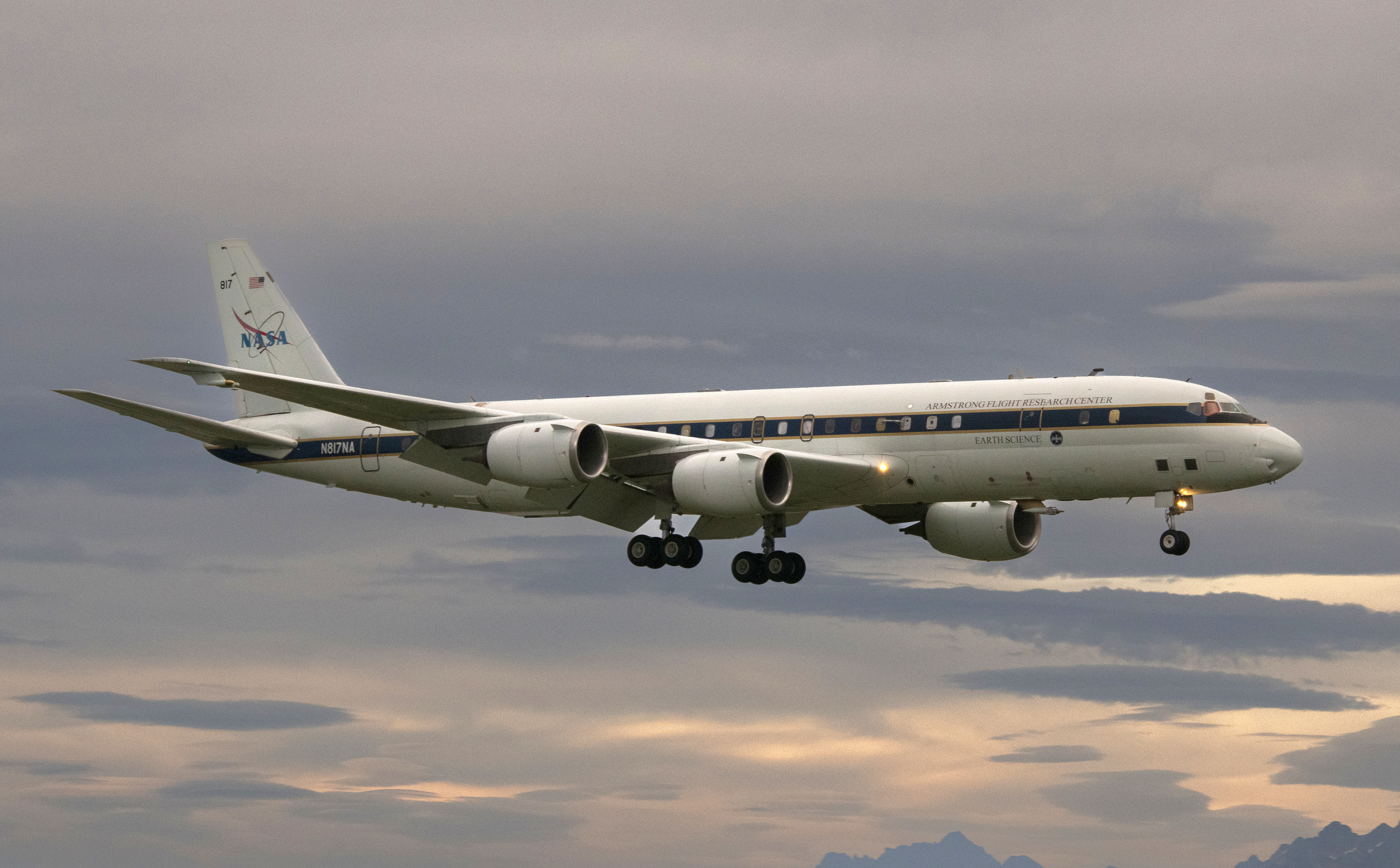
NASA’s DC-8 approaching Everett during the SAF emissions tests

Test flights started on October 12, 2023, based at Everett Paine Field. 11 flights were performed, 8 over Montana and three over the Pacific off the coast of Oregon, at constant altitudes ranging from 30,000 ft (9,100 m) to 38,000 ft (12,000 m). The average duration of each flight was around five hours, generally flying an extended racetrack pattern. At the end of the final test flight on November 1, the Explorer aircraft returned to Everett while the DC-8 flew back to Plant 42, Palmdale, California.

NASA stated that the test results will be released to the public. In January 2026 Boeing released some interim findings and further details of the testing.

==== Third project ====
On December 10 2025, Boeing announced that it had completed the third ecoDemonstrator Explorer project, using a 737 MAX 8 of United Airlines who also provided the pilots. The project tested Internet Protocol Suite (IPS) communications, designed to replace existing systems to offer a network with improved safety and strengthened security, using satellite links between the aircraft, air traffic control, and airline operation centers. IPS is a component of Trajectory Based Operations (TBO) as trialled in the first ecoDemonstrator Explorer project.

Collaborating organisations on the project were Collins Aerospace, Embry-Riddle Aeronautical University, The European Space Agency (ESA), the US FAA, Honeywell, SITA, Thales, Viasat, and NASA.

The aircraft used was temporarily withdrawn from United's active fleet and spent seven days in preparation at Houston's George Bush Intercontinental Airport. The aircraft wore standard UAL livery, but "Boeing ecoDemonstrator EXPLORER" stickers were added to the rear fuselage, surrounded by the logos of the participating organisations. The aircraft made its first test flight on October 29, and a total of nine flights were performed out of Houston until November 2. It then flew via Bangor, Maine, to Edinburgh, Scotland from where it made a test flight on November 6 over The Netherlands and Germany, returning to Houston, again via Bangor, on the 7th. After a week of preparations, the aircraft returned to airline service on November 14.

==== Fourth project ====
In July 2026 Boeing announced that the next ecoDemonstrator Explorer project would be a 787-9 destined for Lufthansa. It would be testing a Next Generation short engine inlet designed for the aircraft's Rolls-Royce Trent 1000 TEN engines with the aims of improving engine efficiency and reducing noise. The inlets are also equipped with an expanded acoustic liner. The testing, focussing on noise measurements, would take place at the airfield at Glasgow, Montana.

Also being tested are modified departure and arrival procedures with Intelligent Operations flightpaths for further noise reduction near airports.

The tests took place during July 2026 and were completed ahead of schedule. They consisted of 12 flights totalling around 52 flight hours.

=== ecoDemonstrator Explorer aircraft summary ===
Date	Test topic	Aircraft	Previously	Registration	Livery	Fate
June 2023	Trajectory-based operations	Boeing 787-10	Boeing testbed (Vietnam Airlines VN-A876 not taken up)	N8290V	Plain white with stickers	Delivered to TAAG Angola Airlines as D2-TET
October/November 2023	SAF emissions	Boeing 737 MAX 10	New	N27602	United Airlines special	To be delivered to United Airlines (Note: At that time the MAX 10 model had not been certificated, so could not be delivered to any airlines.)
October/November 2025	Internet Protocol Suite	Boeing 737 MAX 8	United Airlines	N47345	United Airlines with stickers	United Airlines
July 2026	Next Generation Inlet	Boeing 787-9	Boeing testbed (LOT Polish Airlines SP-LSH not taken up)	N20168	Lufthansa with stickers	To be delivered to Lufthansa

== See also ==
- Boeing Truss-Braced Wing
- Boeing X-66
- Environmental impact of aviation
