= Hurel-Dubois HD.31 =

French high aspect wing aircraft, 1953

HD.31, HD.32, and HD.34
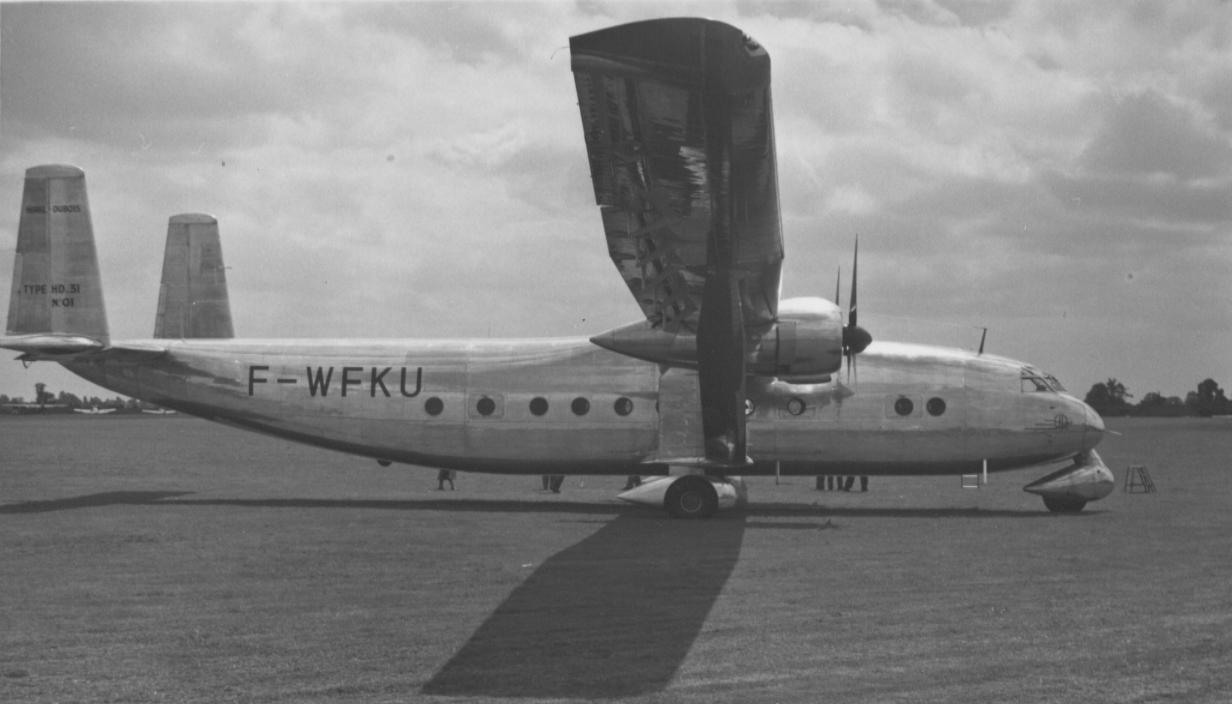
- The prototype HD.31 demonstrating at Coventry Airport in June 1954

General information
- Type: Airliner
- National origin: France
- Manufacturer: Hurel-Dubois
- Primary user: Institut Géographique National
- Number built: 11

History
- First flight: 27 January 1953 (HD.31); 29 December 1953 (HD.32)

The Hurel-Dubois HD.31, HD.32, and HD.34 were a family of civil aircraft produced in France in the 1950s, based on the high-aspect ratio wing designs of Maurice Hurel.

== Design and construction ==
Tests with the Hurel-Dubois HD.10 research aircraft had validated Hurel's ideas about the practicality of such wings, and the French government agreed to sponsor the construction of two prototypes of a medium-range airliner utilising this same principle. These aircraft, the HD.31 and HD.32 were conventional designs in all respects other than their unorthodox wings, and differed from one another only in their powerplants, although both were later converted to use the same engines. The twin-tails originally fitted were also later replaced by a large single tail fin assisted by smaller auxiliary fins. With their new engines and tails, they were redesignated HD.321.01 and HD.321.02. Apart from the HD.34 survey aircraft, all had fixed, faired tricycle undercarriages.

== Production and operational history ==
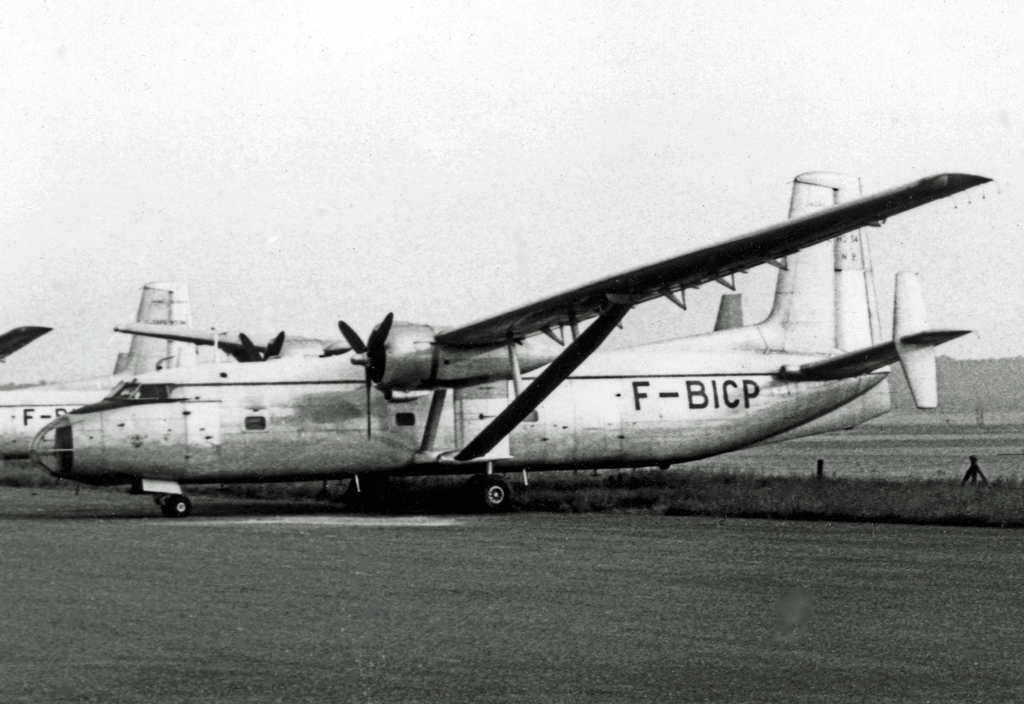
HD.34 survey aircraft of the IGN at its base at Creil airfield in 1967

Two HD.31s were ordered by the French government but only one was built, the Wright Cyclone-powered HD.31 F-WFKU flew on the 27 January 1953. The company then produced a Pratt & Whitney R-1830-92-powered variant, the HD.32. Other than the engines it was the same as the HD.31. Keeping the original twin tails of the prototype the first HD.32 flew on 29 December 1953. The engines were changed to 1525 hp Wright 982-4 engines and to counter the increased power the twin fin was replaced by a single one and the type was redesignated the HD.321. The second HD.32 which first flew in February 1955 was also modified to HD.321 standard.

Air France originally placed an order for 24 aircraft in November 1953 to use as feederliners, it was followed by an order for four for the Institut Géographique National and four for Aigle Azur. With these orders discussion took place with SNCASE to build and market up to 150 aircraft. None were actually built for Air France or Aigle Azur but the IGN continued to be interested in an aerial photography variant to replace the Boeing B-17 Flying Fortress the company was then using. Eight aircraft were ordered by the IGN, based at Creil airfield to the north of Paris. The aircraft's wing design made it ideal for long-duration, low-speed flight, ideal for aerial photography and survey work. These machines were designated HD.34 and were fitted with an extensively glazed nose and an offset retractable nosewheel. They flew with IGN between the late 1950s and mid 1970s. A single example remains airworthy, operated by the Association des Mécaniciens-Pilotes d'Aéronefs Anciens.

The Aeronatique Naval evaluated the HD.31 and the company proposed an anti-submarine warfare variant to meet a requirement for 100 aircraft but nothing materialised.

== Variants ==
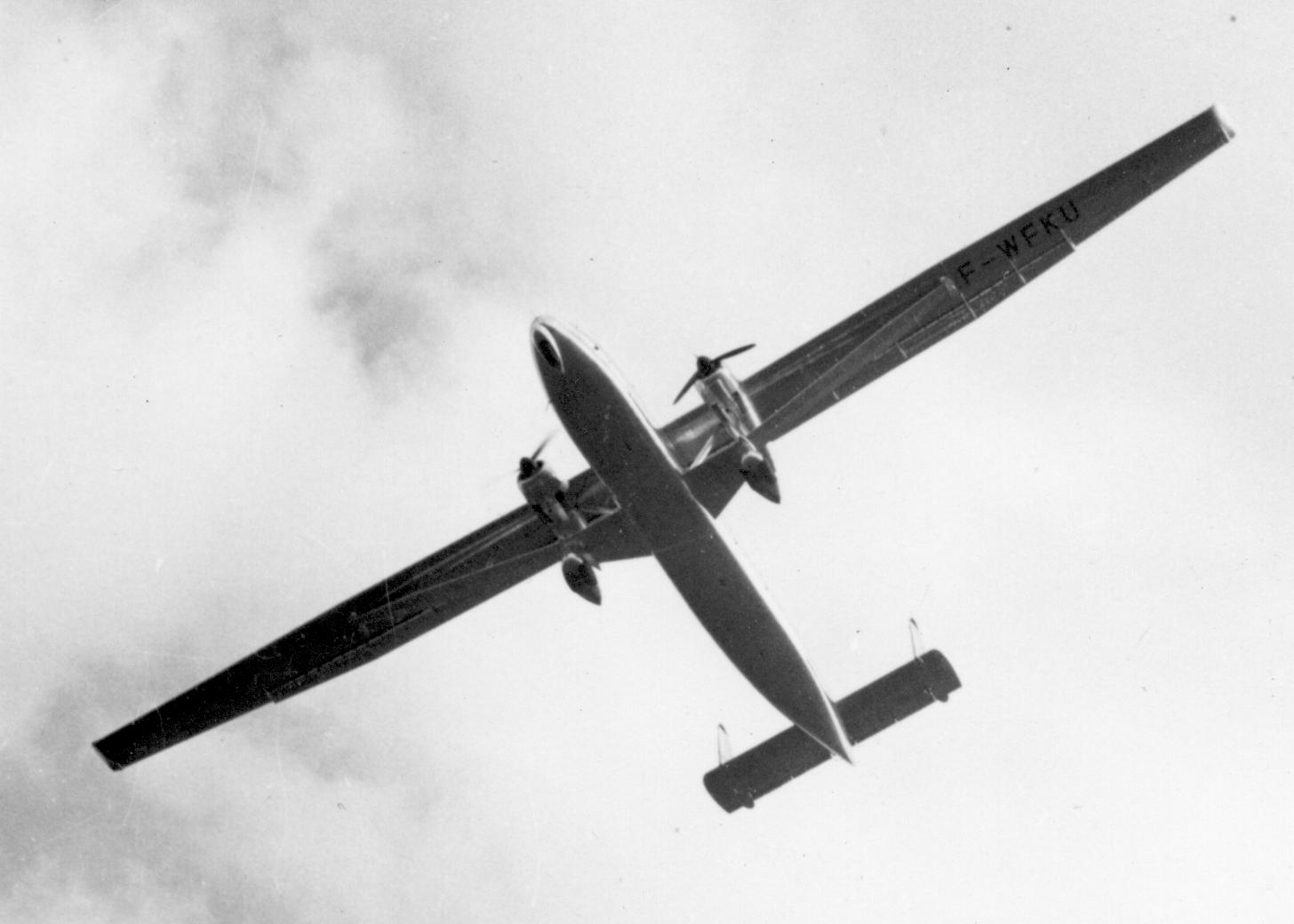
The prototype HD31 demonstrating at Coventry Airport in June 1954

- HD.31 - Prototype with 800 hp (600 kW) Wright Cyclone C7BA1 radial engines. One built.
- HD.32 - Two 1,200 hp (890 kW) Pratt & Whitney R-1830-92 radial engines and fitted with twin fins. Two built - later converted to HD.321s.
  - HD.321 - Conversion of HD.32 with 1,525 hp (1,137 kW) Wright Cyclone 982 engines and single central and two small auxiliary fins.
  - HD.324 - turboprop version with Rolls-Royce Dart engines. (not built)
- HD.33
  - HD.331 - projected militarised version for use as troop transport or air ambulance. (not built)
- HD.34 - Aerial survey version for IGN, powered by 1,475 hp (1,100 kW) Cyclone R1820 C.9 HE engines, with retractable, offset nosewheel and lengthened, glazed nose. Eight built.
- HD.35 - Proposed anti-submarine variant for the French Navy, not built.
- HD.36 - Proposed anti-submarine variant for the French Navy, not built.
- HD.37 - a proposed car-ferry version, not built.

== Operators ==
France

- French Air Force - one HD.321
- French government - one HD.321
- French Naval Aviation - the HD.31 was used for evaluation
- Institut Geographique National - eight HD.34s

== Accidents and incidents ==
Of the HD.31, HD.32, and HD.34 family, there have been two accidents, both involving Hurel-Dubois HD.32s;

- On 30 October, 1956, an HD.321 crashed into Guanabara Bay near Rio de Janeiro, Brazil, during a demonstration flight prior to celebrations in Rio de Janeiro surrounding the 50th anniversary of Alberto Santos-Dumont's first flight. One passenger died in the accident.
- On 10 May 1960, an HD.32 overran the wet grass runway at Villemoleix, France, hit a power pole and came to rest in a pond. The aircraft, operated by l'Armée de L'Air, was damaged beyond repair.

== Specifications (HD.321) ==
Data from Jane's All the World's Aircraft 1958–59

General characteristics

- Crew: Three
- Capacity: 44 passengers
- Length: 23.27 m (76 ft 4 in)
- Wingspan: 45.30 m (148 ft 7 in)
- Height: 8.73 m (28 ft 8 in)
- Wing area: 100.0 m^{2} (1,076 sq ft)
- Aspect ratio: 20.2:1
- Empty weight: 11,112 kg (24,498 lb)
- Gross weight: 18,700 kg (41,226 lb)
- Powerplant: 2 × Wright Cyclone 982-C9-HE1 nine-cylinder air-cooled radial engine, 1,137 kW (1,525 hp) each

Performance

- Cruise speed: 275 km/h (171 mph, 148 kn)
- Stall speed: 120 km/h (75 mph, 65 kn)
- Range: 2,200 km (1,400 mi, 1,200 nmi)
- Rate of climb: 4.8 m/s (940 ft/min)

== See also ==
- Short Skyvan
- Short 330
- Short 360
- Boeing Truss-Braced Wing

== Bibliography ==
- Barnier, Pierre (October 1993). "Pierre Barnier et le Hurel Dubois HD 34" [Pierre Barnier and the Hurel Dubois 34]. Le Fana de l'Aviation (in French) (287): 34–39. ISSN 0757-4169.
- Bridgman, Leonard, ed. (1953). Jane's All the World's Aircraft 1953–54. London: Jane's All the World's Aircraft Publishing Co. Ltd.
- Bridgman, Leonard, ed. (1958). Jane's All the World's Aircraft 1958–59. London: Sampson Low, Marston & Company, Ltd.
- Chillon, Jacques; Dubois, Jean-Pierre & Wegg, John (1980). French Post-War Transport Aircraft. Tonbridge, UK: Air-Britain. ISBN 0-85130-078-2.
- Cuny, Jean (1989). Les avions de combat français, 2: Chasse lourde, bombardement, assaut, exploration [French Combat Aircraft 2: Heavy Fighters, Bombers, Attack, Reconnaissance]. Docavia (in French). Vol. 30. Ed. Larivière. OCLC 36836833.
- Simpson, R. W. (1995). Airlife's General Aviation. Shrewsbury: Airlife Publishing. ISBN 1-85310-577-5.
