= Glasgow Airport (disambiguation) =

Glasgow Airport is the primary airport serving Glasgow, Scotland, United Kingdom.

Glasgow Airport may also refer to:

== Canada ==
- Rodney (New Glasgow) Airport, in Rodney, Ontario

== United Kingdom ==
- Glasgow Prestwick Airport, in South Ayrshire, a secondary airport serving Glasgow, Scotland
- Glasgow (Renfrew) Airport, also known as RAF Renfrew, the predecessor of Glasgow International Airport
- Glasgow Seaplane Terminal, in Glasgow, Scotland

== United States ==
- Glasgow Airport (Montana), also known as Wokal Field, in Glasgow, Montana
- Glasgow Air Force Base, a former United States Air Force base near Glasgow, Montana
- Glasgow Industrial Airport, a private airport located on the site of the former Glasgow Air Force Base near Glasgow, Montana
- Glasgow Municipal Airport, in Kentucky
