= TBW =

TBW may refer to:

== Science and medicine ==
- Terabytes written, the number of terabytes that can be written to a solid-state drive within its warranty service
- Total body water, concept in physiology

== Transport ==
- TBW, the IATA code of Tambov Donskoye Airport, Russia
- TBW, the National Rail station code of Tunbridge Wells railway station, Kent, England

== Organisations ==
- Tampa Bay Water, American drinking water company

== Other ==
- Boeing Truss-Braced Wing, a proposed airplane design with high aspect ratio wings
- "That Bloody Woman", derogatory nickname for Margaret Thatcher
- The Bridge World, American magazine about contract bridge
- That Bloody Woman, a 2015 New Zealand musical about Kate Sheppard and New Zealand women's suffrage
- That Bloody Woman, the title of a 2008 biography of welfare campaigner Emily Hobhouse
