= St. Marie, Montana =

- CDP
- Location of St. Marie, Montana
- Coordinates: 48°24′11″N 106°31′58″W
- Country: United States
- State: Montana
- County: Valley

Area
  - Total: 22.90 sq mi (59.31 km^{2})
  - Land: 22.90 sq mi (59.31 km^{2})
  - Water: 0 sq mi (0.00 km^{2})
- Elevation: 2,730 ft (830 m)

Population (2020)
  - Total: 489
  - Density: 21.4/sq mi (8.25/km^{2})
- Time zone: UTC-7 (Mountain (MST))
  - Summer (DST): UTC-6 (MDT)
- ZIP code: 59231
- Area code: 406
- FIPS code: 30-65400
- GNIS feature ID: 2409228

St. Marie or Saint Marie is a census-designated place (CDP) in Valley County, Montana, United States. As of the 2020 census, St. Marie had a population of 489. It is located at the site of the former Glasgow Air Force Base.

When the Air Force base was decommissioned, the on-base housing was purchased and offered for sale to private individuals. While many of the bids for the houses were from salvage companies, the community ultimately escaped demolition. Homes which had housed thousands of military personnel when the base was in operation were briefly promoted as condominiums for retirees.

Despite local efforts, most of the re-purposed housing units sit empty and abandoned. A few hundred residents remain in what is otherwise a partial ghost town. The runway remains in use as Glasgow Industrial Airport (FAA LID: 07MT), a test site for Boeing aircraft. The nearby city of Glasgow, Montana has dropped in population by half (from 6400 in the 1960s to 3250 in 2010) after the base closure.

Beginning in 2012 the community became embroiled in a series of legal and political conflicts with an anti-government group called the "Citizens Action Committee of Valley County," part of the larger Sovereign Citizen movement, with a similar philosophy to that of the Montana Freemen. The group intended to take ownership of the community through buying and seizing up a large amount of mostly vacant properties through bogus liens and litigation, while ostensibly planning a handful of investment schemes to redevelop them. The situation led to a number of St. Marie property owners being sued and a community backlash against the group followed.

The post office and town hall are still in operation along with a small handful of local businesses, but the school and a majority of businesses have closed. St. Marie has gained some interest from ghost town enthusiasts and back road explorers in recent years for its uniquely Atomic Age appeal, being much more intact and modern than most vacated locales and containing a fair number of larger buildings. In 2024, the town was used as a filming location for the short film "Orchards of a Futile Heaven."

== History ==
At its peak, 7000 people lived in St. Marie in the mid 1970s. The community was established to provide housing for the servicemen and their families stationed at Glasgow Air Force Base.

Despite the closure, the legacy of Glasgow Air Force Base lives on through the town of St. Marie, Montana. In 1976, the former on-base housing areas were purchased and offered for sale to private individuals.

== Geography ==
According to the United States Census Bureau, the CDP has a total area of 22.9 square miles (59 km^{2}), of which 22.8 square miles (59 km^{2}) is land and 0.1 square miles (0.26 km^{2}) (0.44%) is water.

== Climate ==
According to the Köppen Climate Classification system, St. Marie has a cold semi-arid climate, abbreviated "BSk" on climate maps. The hottest temperature recorded in St. Marie was 103 °F (39.4 °C) on July 24–25, 2007, while the coldest temperature recorded was −39 °F (−39.4 °C) on January 13, 2024.

Climate data for St. Marie, Montana, 1991–2020 normals, extremes 1959–present
Month	Jan	Feb	Mar	Apr	May	Jun	Jul	Aug	Sep	Oct	Nov	Dec	Year
Record high °F (°C)	56 (13)	62 (17)	73 (23)	85 (29)	90 (32)	96 (36)	103 (39)	102 (39)	100 (38)	88 (31)	75 (24)	62 (17)	103 (39)
Mean maximum °F (°C)	45.7 (7.6)	45.8 (7.7)	60.3 (15.7)	75.1 (23.9)	81.5 (27.5)	90.0 (32.2)	96.5 (35.8)	95.6 (35.3)	89.3 (31.8)	76.8 (24.9)	62.0 (16.7)	46.2 (7.9)	98.3 (36.8)
Mean daily maximum °F (°C)	24.3 (−4.3)	27.9 (−2.3)	41.4 (5.2)	56.1 (13.4)	66.5 (19.2)	74.7 (23.7)	84.5 (29.2)	83.9 (28.8)	72.8 (22.7)	56.5 (13.6)	39.3 (4.1)	27.2 (−2.7)	54.6 (12.5)
Daily mean °F (°C)	15.0 (−9.4)	18.3 (−7.6)	30.6 (−0.8)	43.5 (6.4)	53.8 (12.1)	62.7 (17.1)	70.6 (21.4)	69.8 (21.0)	59.3 (15.2)	44.8 (7.1)	29.8 (−1.2)	18.3 (−7.6)	43.0 (6.1)
Mean daily minimum °F (°C)	5.7 (−14.6)	8.7 (−12.9)	19.7 (−6.8)	30.8 (−0.7)	41.1 (5.1)	50.7 (10.4)	56.8 (13.8)	55.7 (13.2)	45.9 (7.7)	33.0 (0.6)	20.3 (−6.5)	9.4 (−12.6)	31.5 (−0.3)
Mean minimum °F (°C)	−21.0 (−29.4)	−13.6 (−25.3)	−5.7 (−20.9)	14.4 (−9.8)	27.3 (−2.6)	40.1 (4.5)	47.9 (8.8)	43.8 (6.6)	30.7 (−0.7)	15.0 (−9.4)	−2.0 (−18.9)	−14.4 (−25.8)	−25.6 (−32.0)
Record low °F (°C)	−39 (−39)	−37 (−38)	−25 (−32)	−4 (−20)	18 (−8)	32 (0)	40 (4)	37 (3)	19 (−7)	−1 (−18)	−20 (−29)	−34 (−37)	−39 (−39)
Average precipitation inches (mm)	0.25 (6.4)	0.20 (5.1)	0.23 (5.8)	0.82 (21)	1.94 (49)	3.08 (78)	1.57 (40)	1.32 (34)	0.99 (25)	0.95 (24)	0.26 (6.6)	0.16 (4.1)	11.77 (299)
Average precipitation days (≥ 0.01 in)	3.4	2.9	3.1	5.5	8.8	11.4	7.4	6.3	5.7	5.6	3.3	3.4	66.8
Source 1: NOAA
Source 2: National Weather Service

== Demographics ==
Historical population
Census	Pop.	Note	%±
2020	489		—
U.S. Decennial Census

As of the census of 2000, there were 183 people, 92 households, and 59 families residing in the CDP. The population density was 8.0 people per square mile (3.1/km^{2}). There were 1,035 housing units at an average density of 45.3 per square mile (17.5/km^{2}). The racial makeup of the CDP was 63.44% White, 2.19% African American, 2.73% Native American, 20.55% Asian, and 1.09% from two or more races. Hispanic or Latino of any race were 10.55% of the population.

There were 92 households, out of which 14.1% had children under the age of 18 living with them, 57.6% were married couples living together, 6.5% had a female householder with no husband present, and 34.8% were non-families. 32.6% of all households were made up of individuals, and 17.4% had someone living alone who was 65 years of age or older. The average household size was 1.99 and the average family size was 2.45.

In the CDP, the population was spread out, with 14.8% under the age of 18, 2.7% from 18 to 24, 12.0% from 25 to 44, 35.5% from 45 to 64, and 35.0% who were 65 years of age or older. The median age was 60 years. For every 100 females, there were 103.3 males. For every 100 females age 18 and over, there were 97.5 males.

The median income for a household in the CDP was $33,750, and the median income for a family was $34,792. Males had a median income of $18,750 versus $17,188 for females. The per capita income for the CDP was $16,314. None of the families and 2.3% of the population were living below the poverty line.

At its peak, St. Marie was home to over 7,000 permanent residents and intended to house nearly 10,000.
