= Leonard Bridgman =

British artist and book editor (1895–1980)

Leonard Bridgman (1895–1980) was a British artist and the former editor of Jane's All the World's Aircraft.

== First assignment ==
Bridgman's first assignment in aviation was in 1913 at the age of 18 years. One of his drawings was used to illustrate the Hendon Air Race program. As payment, he received a flight in a 70-horsepower Maurice Farman biplane.

== Career in the army ==
During the First World War, Bridgman served as an officer in the Honourable Artillery Company.

== Journalism career ==
He is best remembered within the aviation industry as the journalist who joined C G Grey in 1923 on the staff of Jane's All the World's Aircraft after working on the staff at The Aeroplane.

== Career as an editor ==
Bridgman also edited a book by the name of Esso Air World from 1939 to 1963.

== Awards ==
In 1956, in recognition of his contribution to technology, principally his work on Jane's All the World's Aircraft, Bridgman was awarded a Paul Tissandier Diploma by the Federation Aeronautique Internationale. By that time, he had been associated with flying and publishing for 43 years.

== Career as an artist ==
Bridgman was also a talented artist and produced many aviation paintings, wash drawings and illustrations. He received commissions for numerous advertisements for British companies and illustrated Oliver Stewart's text for The Clouds Remember, one of the classics of aviation literature.
