= Boeing Truss-Braced Wing =

Aircraft research program

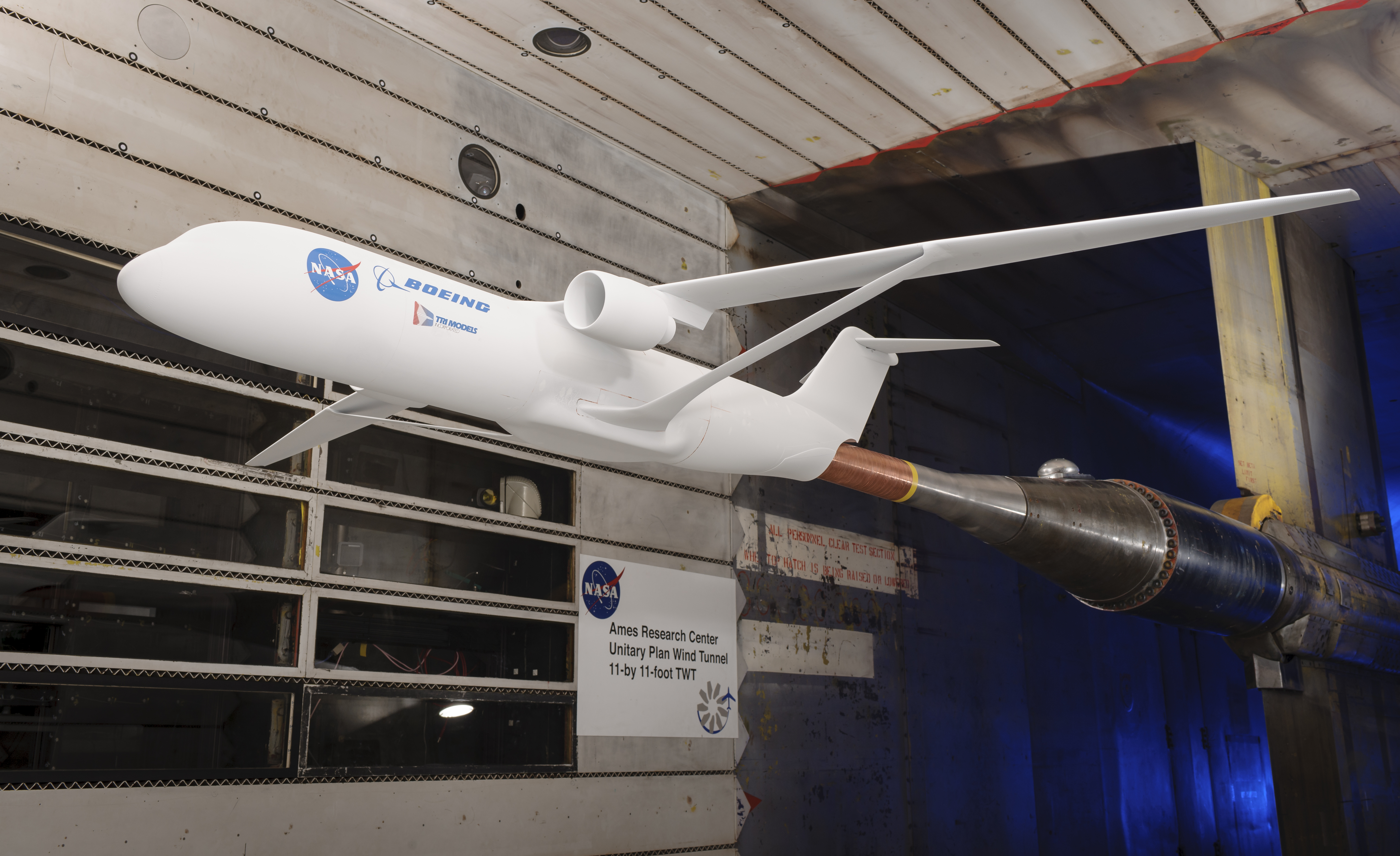
Model at NASA Ames wind tunnel

Boeing Truss-Braced Wing are airliner designs studied by Boeing with braced, high aspect ratio wings.

== SUGAR Volt ==
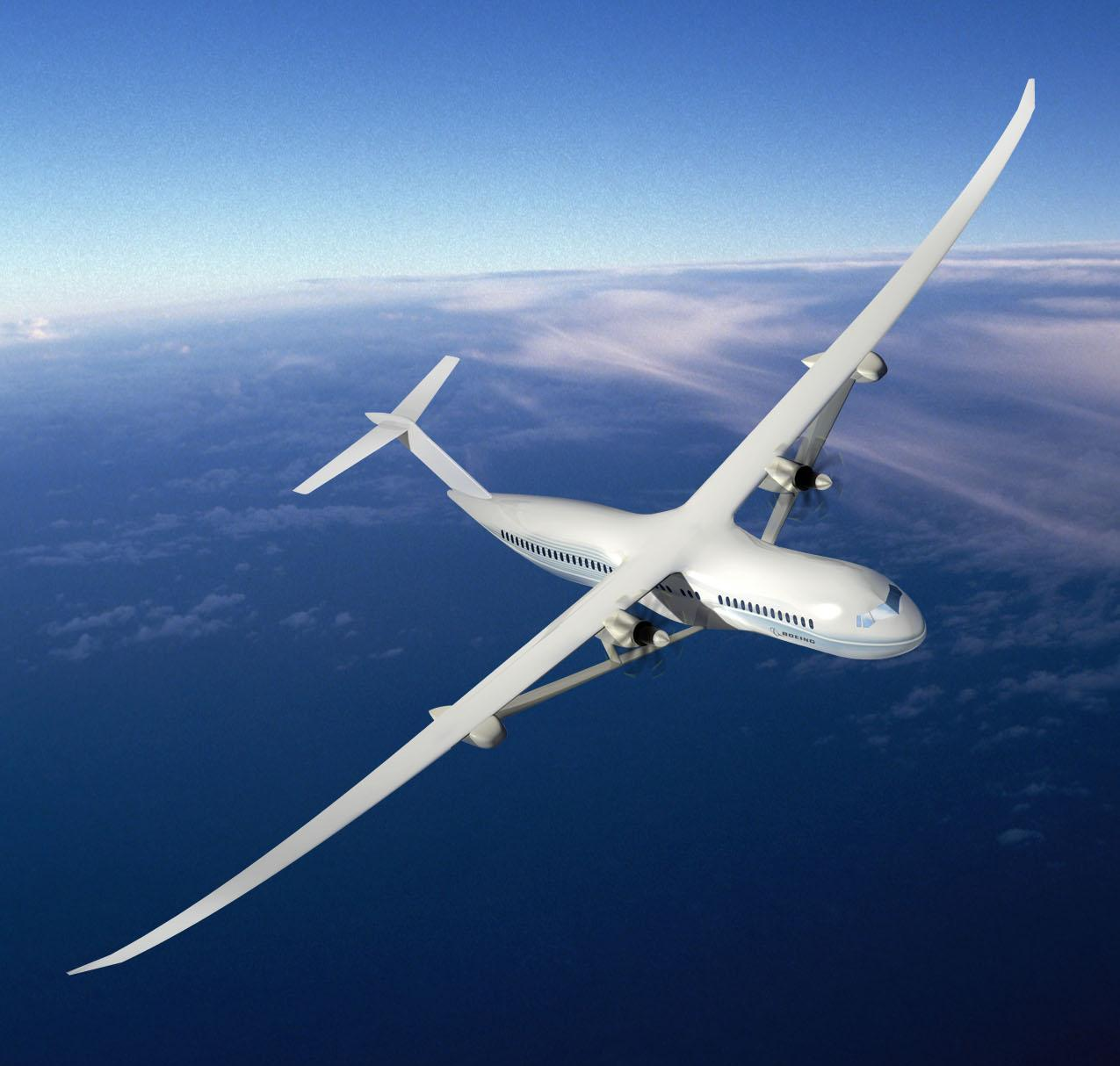
Illustration of the Boeing SUGAR Volt concept aircraft

SUGAR Volt is the hybrid aircraft concept proposed by a team led by Boeing's Research & Technology division. It is one of a series of concepts put forward in response to a request for proposals for future aircraft issued by NASA. It is proposed that SUGAR Volt would use two hybrid turbofans that burn conventional jet fuel when taking off, then use electric motors to power the engines while flying. SUGAR stands for Subsonic Ultragreen Aircraft Research; "Volt" suggests that it would be at least partly powered by electricity.

SUGAR Volt would have emissions about 70 percent lower than average airliners today. Noise pollution will also be lower than airliners today. This hybrid-electric approach however remains to be balanced against increased complexity, large electric engine and battery size and weight. Relying partly on electric power might reduce specific fuel consumption (SFC) compared to a standard turbine-only design (turbofan or lower-consumption turboprops).

SUGAR Volt is designed with a long, braced, high aspect ratio wing that decreases induced drag due to lift. The wings of SUGAR Volt would enable it to take off in a shorter distance and generate less noise. The outer wings of the SUGAR Volt should fold to save ground space, increasing weight.

== Transonic truss-braced wing ==
Using a shortened MD-90 airframe, a full-scale Sustainable Flight Demonstrator (SFD), designated X-66A, should fly in 2028, outlining a possible family of 130-to-210-seat aircraft.

== See also ==
- ecoDemonstrator
- Airbus: Wing of Tomorrow
- Hurel-Dubois HD.31
