= Glasgow Industrial Airport =

Airport in Montana, US

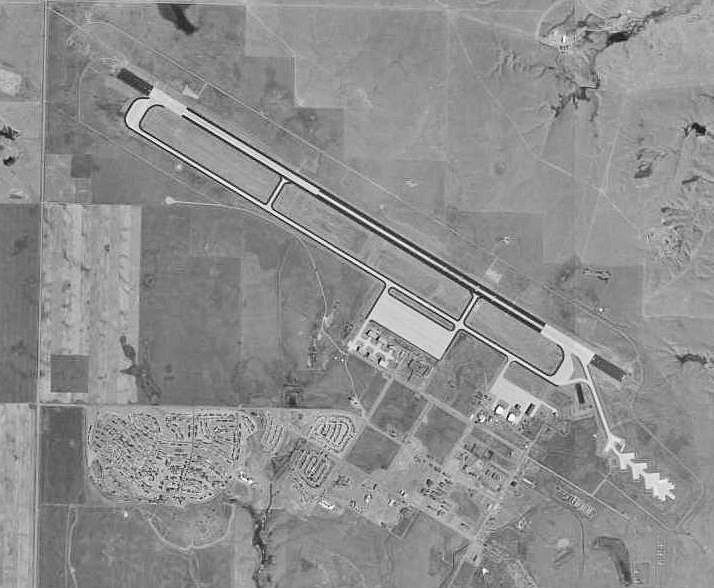
- USGS aerial photo as of 11 August 1996
- IATA: none; ICAO: none; FAA LID: 07MT

Summary
- Airport type: Private
- Owner: Montana Aviation Research Company
- Location: St. Marie, Valley County, near Glasgow, Montana
- Elevation AMSL: 2,762 ft (842 m)
- Coordinates: 48°25′16″N 106°31′40″W
- Interactive map of Glasgow Industrial Airport

Runways
| Direction | Length | | Surface |
| Direction | ft | m | Surface |
|---|---|---|---|
| 11/29 | 13,500 | 4,115 | Concrete |
- Source: Federal Aviation Administration

Glasgow Industrial Airport (FAA LID: 07MT) is a private airport located 14 nautical miles (16 miles or 26 km) northeast of the central business district of Glasgow, a city in Valley County, Montana, United States.

The airport is located on the site of the former Glasgow Air Force Base which was in operation from 1957 to 1968, then again from 1972 to 1976.

The Boeing Company operates a Flight Test Facility at this airport, which is maintained and operated by the Montana Aviation Research Company (MARCO), a Boeing subsidiary.

== Facilities ==
Glasgow Industrial Airport covers an area of 3,800 acres (1,500 ha) at an elevation of 2,762 feet (842 m) above mean sea level. It has one runway designated 11/29 with a 13,500 ft by 300 ft (4,115 m x 91 m) concrete surface.

== See also ==
- List of airports in Montana
