= List of the busiest airports in the Philippines =

Busiest airports in the Philippines

Mactan-Cebu International Airport Terminal 2 exterior

This is a list of the busiest airports in the Philippines by passenger traffic published by the Civil Aviation Authority of the Philippines. Passenger traffic data includes commercial passengers on domestic and international flights, general aviation flights and military flights.

Note that passenger statistics for only the country's national civilian airports is compiled by the CAAP. Among the 85 national airports, the statistics for airports managed by other government corporations (such as Clark International Airport, managed by the Clark International Airport Corporation; Subic Bay International Airport, managed by the Subic Bay Metropolitan Authority; San Fernando Airport, managed by the Poro Point Management Corporation), as well as other smaller community airports (often unstaffed) are frequently unpublished or simply not recorded. In such cases an em dash ( — ), which the CAAP also uses in its tables, will be used below; note that this does not necessarily indicate a value of 0. Moreover, in some instances the data published by the CAAP pertains to only part of a calendar year. This will be indicated in the tables below, where known. An 'x' indicates that statistics for the airport were not tracked for the year, because the facility is yet to be transferred to CAAP management, has already been transferred to private ownership, or has been closed down.

The CAAP does not compile statistics for private or non-CAAP aerodromes or airfields solely used by the military.

== Impact of the COVID-19 pandemic ==
Air traffic volumes at airports worldwide dramatically declined in 2020 due to the COVID-19 pandemic, including in the Philippines. The rate at which traffic volumes will recover to pre-pandemic levels will depend on numerous factors, including economic recovery and the easing of domestic and international traffic restrictions, however it is anticipated to take several years.

== Passenger traffic (2021–present) ==
Rank	Airport name	Area/island served	IATA	ICAO	2025	2024	2023	2022	2021
1	Ninoy Aquino International Airport	Manila	MNL	RPLL	52,107,504	50,356,465	45,299,607	30,912,162	7,817,120
2	Mactan–Cebu International Airport	Cebu	CEB	RPVM	11,604,218	11,327,070	10,050,340	5,560,258	2,495,491
3	Francisco Bangoy International Airport	Davao	DVO	RPMD	4,390,098	4,339,556	3,844,895	2,769,546	591,982
4	Iloilo International Airport	Iloilo	ILO	RPVI	3,101,280	2,787,791	2,330,053	1,708,764	341,950
5	Clark International Airport	Clark (Angeles/Mabalacat)	CRK	RPLC	2,753,101	2,404,407	1,999,542	768,826	141,402
6	Laguindingan Airport	Cagayan de Oro	CGY	RPMY	2,350,000	2,281,464	1,990,201	1,664,643	611,469
—	Godofredo P. Ramos Airport	Boracay	MPH	RPVE	—	2,036,593	3,288,166	2,308,195 (Note: Data missing for December 2022.)	599,956
7	Bacolod–Silay Airport	Bacolod	BCD	RPVB	2,079,342	1,967,503	1,874,261	1,458,149	511,882
8	Puerto Princesa International Airport	Puerto Princesa	PPS	RPVP	2,020,527	1,907,291	1,717,976	1,121,373	132,420
9	Daniel Z. Romualdez Airport	Tacloban	TAC	RPVA	1,647,489	1,681,655	1,539,674	1,489,803	519,158
10	General Santos International Airport	General Santos	GES	RPMR	1,259,144	1,149,523	904,290	768,749	177,001
11	Zamboanga International Airport	Zamboanga	ZAM	RPMZ	1,174,625	1,179,804	1,078,343	929,985	265,073
12	Bicol International Airport (from Oct 2021)	Daraga	DRP	RPLK	1,056,658	808,977	662,580	526,742	—
13	Bancasi Airport	Butuan	BXU	RPME	983,527	857,017	820,774	736,502	265,124
14	Sibulan Airport	Dumaguete	DGT	RPVD	844,982	740,295	650,831	554,261	120,885
15	Bohol–Panglao International Airport	Tagbilaran	TAG	RPSP	2,220,000	2,351,851	1,653,868	1,199,283	248,596
16	Francisco B. Reyes Airport	Busuanga	USU	RPVV	690,747	655,791	594,526	374,644	42,255
17	Kalibo International Airport	Kalibo	KLO	RPVK	648,874	862,183	952,994	628,803	95,541
18	Sayak Airport	Siargao	IAO	RPNS	611,050	589,635	529,822	169,642	64,820
19	Labo Airport	Ozamiz	OZC	RPMO	372,267	374,172	320,295	251,333	78,342
20	Roxas Airport	Roxas	RXS	RPVR	369,618	414,943	404,463	289,861	72,051
21	Pagadian Airport	Pagadian	PAG	RPMP	336,339	482,363	306,277	302,856	152,044
22	Tuguegarao Airport	Tuguegarao	TUG	RPUT	333,895	273,747		147,865	21,870
23	Dipolog Airport	Dipolog	DPL	RPMG	307,467	284,253	257,779	235,553	71,487
24	Laoag International Airport	Laoag	LAO	RPLI	268,421	228,536		78,229	6,307
25	Cauayan Airport	Cauayan	CYZ	RPUY	210,569	119,079		127,572	66,415
26	Cotabato Airport	Cotabato	CBO	RPMC	209,870	140,835	234,606	295,801	161,246
27	Sanga-Sanga Airport	Bongao	TWT	RPMN	166,770	161,942		106,711	24,391
28	Virac Airport	Virac	VRC	RPUV	96,913	96,204		56,529	9,129
29	Calbayog Airport	Calbayog	CYP	RPVC	75,720	68,496		27,540	2,212
30	Naga Airport	Naga	WNP	RPUN	71,896	91,604		71,487	8,999
31	Camiguin Airport	Camiguin	CGM	RPMH	66,125	63,215		5,661	2,105
32	Basco Airport	Basco	BSO	RPUO	61,510	55,654		29,919	8,364
33	Moises R. Espinosa Airport	Masbate	MBT	RPVJ	48,269	49,276		51,339	20,402
34	Surigao Airport	Surigao	SUG	RPMS	47,456	75,717		37,583	11,864
35	Catarman Airport	Catarman	CRM	RPVF	42,982	35,196		15,135	3,913
36	San Jose Airport	San Jose (Occidental Mindoro)	SJI	RPUH	39,982	44,307		37,712	13,502
37	Evelio Javier Airport	San Jose de Buenavista	EUQ	RPVS	17,217	20,818		12,146	—
38	Borongan Airport	Borongan	-	RPVW	15,806	11,207		455	58
39	San Vicente Airport	San Vicente	-	-	12,101	6,197		2,708	1,640
40	Tugdan Airport	Tablas	TBH	RPVU	478	8,892		2,308	458
41	Loakan Airport	Baguio	BAG	RPUB	—	8,832		968	1,532
—	Legazpi Airport (until Oct 2021)	Legazpi	LGP	RPLP	—	—	—	—	116,960
—	Palanan Airport	Palanan	-	RPLN				17,630	21,250
—	Jolo Airport	Jolo	JOL	RPMJ				2,484	3,782
—	Mindoro Airport	Vigan	-	RPUQ				1,978	14,623
—	Sangley Point Airport	Cavite City	SGL	RPLS				683	2
—	Cuyo Airport	Cuyo	CYU	RPLO				327	943
—	Bagabag Airport	Bagabag	-	RPUZ				48	704
—	Alabat Airport	Alabat	-	RPLY				—	—
—	Allah Valley Airport	Surallah	AAV	RPMA				—	—
—	Bacon Airport	Sorsogon	-	-				—	1
—	Bagasbas Airport	Daet	DTE	RPUD				—	—
—	Bantayan Airport	Bantayan	-	RPSB				—	—
—	Biliran Airport	Biliran	-	RPVQ				—	168
—	Bislig Airport	Bislig	BPH	RPMF				—	—
—	Bulan Airport	Bulan	-	RPUU				—	15
—	Calapan Airport	Calapan	CPP	RPUK				—	852
—	Cagayan de Sulu Airport	Mapun	CDY	RPMU				—	—
—	Catbalogan Airport	Catbalogan	-	RPVY				—	221
—	Dr. Juan C. Angara Airport	Baler	BQA	RPUR				—	818
—	Guiuan Airport	Guiuan	-	RPVG				—	329
—	Hilongos Airport	Hilongos	-	RPVH				–	29
—	Iba Airport	Iba	-	RPUI				—	15,827
—	Ipil Airport	Ipil	IPE	RPMV				–	—
—	Jomalig Airport	Jomalig	-	RPLJ				—	—
—	Itbayat Airport	Itbayat	-	RPLT				—	1,431
—	Liloy Airport	Liloy	-	RPMX				—	24
—	Lingayen Airport	Lingayen	-	RPUG				—	27,346
—	Lubang Airport	Lubang	LBX	RPLU				—	23,956
—	Malabang Airport	Malabang	MLP	RPMM				—	—
—	Mamburao Airport	Mamburao	MBO	RPUM				—	540
—	Maria Cristina Airport	Iligan	IGN	RPMI				—	—
—	Marinduque Airport	Marinduque	MRQ	RPUW				—	740
—	Mati Airport	Mati	MXI	RPMQ				—	—
—	Ormoc Airport	Ormoc	OMC	RPVO				—	554
—	Panan-awan Airport	Maasin	-	RPSM				—	334
—	Plaridel Airport	Plaridel	-	RPUX				—	—
—	Pinamalayan Airport	Pinamalayan	-	RPLA				—	—
—	Rosales Airport	Rosales	-	RPLR				—	—
—	San Fernando Airport	San Fernando (La Union)	SFE	RPUS				—	—
—	Siocon Airport	Siocon	XSO	RPNO				—	—
—	Siquijor Airport	Siquijor	-	RPVZ				—	401
—	Sorsogon Airport	Sorsogon	-	RPLZ				—	—
—	Subic Bay International Airport	Subic Bay Freeport	SFS	RPLB				—	—
—	Tandag Airport	Tandag	TDG	RPMW				—	59
—	Ubay Airport	Ubay	-	RPSN				—	—
—	Wasig Airport	Mansalay	-	RPLG				—	—

== Passenger traffic (2016–2020) ==
2020 rank	Airport name	Area/island served	IATA	ICAO	2020	2019	2018	2017	2016
1	Ninoy Aquino International Airport	Manila	MNL	RPLL	11,145,614	47,898,046	45,054,308	42,022,484	39,516,782
2	Mactan–Cebu International Airport	Cebu	CEB	RPVM	2,748,633	12,662,055	11,377,887	10,050,940	8,830,638
3	Francisco Bangoy International Airport	Davao	DVO	RPMD	989,089	4,490,086	4,435,557	4,234,667	3,553,201
4	Clark International Airport	Angeles City	CRK	RPLC	941,532	4,000,211	2,664,378	1,514,531	951,007
5	Iloilo International Airport	Iloilo	ILO	RPVI	686,578	2,834,898	2,295,983	2,023,016	1,943,719
6	Laguindingan Airport	Cagayan de Oro	CGY	RPMY	581,136	2,310,473	2,079,684	1,814,644	1,776,353
7	Puerto Princesa International Airport	Puerto Princesa	PPS	RPVP	475,322	2,163,731	2,146,350	1,790,115	1,644,003
8	Bacolod–Silay Airport	Bacolod	BCD	RPVB	445,480	1,706,229	1,770,266	1,579,199	1,498,741
9	Godofredo P. Ramos Airport	Boracay	MPH	RPVE	439,893	1,789,511	902,594	1,330,719	736,559
10	Kalibo International Airport	Kalibo	KLO	RPVK	391,429	1,750,560	1,421,504	2,520,168	2,711,036
11	Daniel Z. Romualdez Airport	Tacloban	TAC	RPVA	363,782	1,405,701	1,443,318	1,165,194	1,182,951
12	Zamboanga International Airport	Zamboanga	ZAM	RPMZ	310,053	1,202,407	1,214,078	1,076,372	980,476
13	Bohol–Panglao International Airport (from Nov 2018)	Tagbilaran	TAG	RPSP	308,270	1,333,938	1,018,699 (Note: Data missing for December 2018.)	921,586	871,383
13	Tagbilaran Airport (till Nov 2018)	Tagbilaran	TAG	RPVT	308,270	1,333,938	1,018,699	921,586	871,383
14	General Santos International Airport	General Santos	GES	RPMR	243,754	1,049,842	920,670	816,037	838,941
15	Sibulan Airport	Dumaguete	DGT	RPVB	181,757	775,214	714,721	597,626	546,276
16	Bancasi Airport	Butuan	BXU	RPME	173,873	736,394	757,842	716,344	681,263
17	Francisco B. Reyes Airport	Busuanga	USU	RPVV	169,297	688,909	676,823	525,044	321,595
18	Legazpi Airport	Legazpi	LGP	RPLP	130,980	680,649	569,535	621,474	564,372
19	Labo Airport	Ozamiz	OZC	RPMO	129,092	371,945	333,891	294,661	290,966
20	Dipolog Airport	Dipolog	DPL	RPMG	87,323	277,717	282,242	249,505	243,418
21	Sayak Airport	Siargao	IAO	RPNS	86,789	447,784	332,309	127,943	53,150
22	Cotabato Airport	Cotabato	CBO	RPMC	83,957	309,556	298,345	289,229	258,529
23	Pagadian Airport	Pagadian	PAG	RPMP	76,649	186,525	192,728	194,476	188,920
24	Roxas Airport	Roxas	RXS	RPVR	67,174	312,519	307,786	281,487	267,388
25	Tuguegarao Airport	Tuguegarao	TUG	RPUT	41,931	225,747	384,819	209,358	186,193
26	Cauayan Airport	Cauayan	CYZ	RPUY	39,818	130,453	222,591	103,011	85,691
27	Laoag International Airport	Laoag	LAO	RPLI	35,780	143,054	151,808	161,019	204,156
28	Basco Airport	Basco	BSO	RPUO	35,215	148,112	151,093	104,089	82,853
29	Sanga-Sanga Airport	Bongao	TWT	RPMN	25,467	144,179	124,439	102,564	108,030
30	Mindoro Airport	Vigan	-	RPUQ	18,486	73,959	47,856	39,733	15,874
31	Lingayen Airport	Lingayen	-	RPUG	17,113	33,844	31,036	22,847	22,454
32	Naga Airport	Naga	WNP	RPUN	15,855	113,012	94,175	143,618	137,329
33	Camiguin Airport	Camiguin	CGM	RPMH	14,971	86,252	64,034	—	—
34	Virac Airport	Virac	VRC	RPUV	14,658	68,334	67,936	53,265	54,021
35	Jolo Airport	Jolo	JOL	RPMJ	13,896	29,170	29,625	24,244	16,463
36	San Jose Airport	San Jose (Occidental Mindoro)	SJI	RPUH	12,991	49,039	47,838	50,846	49,010
37	Lubang Airport	Lubang	LBX	RPLU	12,346	53,803	69,237	85,573	30,513
38	Iba Airport	Iba	-	RPUI	11,994	19,080	16,861	15,932	13,140
39	Moises R. Espinosa Airport	Masbate	MBT	RPVJ	10,639	50,594	75,572	65,627	30,078
40	Catarman Airport	Catarman	CRM	RPVF	9,093	45,804	30,534	25,813	40,237
41	Palanan Airport	Palanan	-	RPLN	6,786	13,223	27,820	13,771	11,462
42	Surigao Airport	Surigao	SUG	RPMS	6,430	31,511	50,400	59,945	104,313
43	Calbayog Airport	Calbayog	CYP	RPVC	6,284	37,143	32,859	44,085	33,961
44	San Vicente Airport	San Vicente	-	-	6,269	36,643	7,632	—	—
45	Tugdan Airport	Tablas	TBH	RPVU	3,678	16,860	19,303	22,373	8,265
46	Marinduque Airport	Marinduque	MRQ	RPUW	2,825	8,929	202	—	—
47	Loakan Airport	Baguio	BAG	RPUB	2,084	1,716	2,145	1,722	1,859
48	Calapan Airport	Calapan	CPP	RPUK	1,094	2,754	3,460	3,052	3,932
49	Evelio Javier Airport	San Jose de Buenavista	EUQ	RPVS	932	11,779	—	—	—
50	Cuyo Airport	Cuyo	CYU	RPLO	852	2,149	4,482	5,255	2,506
51	Siquijor Airport	Siquijor	-	RPVZ	688	6,745	2,114 (Note: Data missing for September to December 2018.)	—	—
52	Mamburao Airport	Mamburao	MBO	RPUM	488	1,562	1,357	1,206	—
53	Tandag Airport	Tandag	TDG	RPMW	335		16,875	15,433	17,775
54	Ormoc Airport	Ormoc	OMC	RPVO	331	47	1,194	32,047	2,294
55	Dr. Juan C. Angara Airport	Baler	BQA	RPUR	277	1,856	1,423	2,040	2,363
56	Biliran Airport	Biliran	-	RPVQ	120	145	806	721	—
57	Catbalogan Airport	Catbalogan	-	RPVY	105	39	168	8	—
58	Bagabag Airport	Bagabag	-	RPUZ	94	1,213	1,714	809	509
59	Panan-awan Airport	Maasin	-	RPSM	75	26	507	1,595	—
60	Hilongos Airport	Hilongos	-	RPVH	46		—	1,226	—
61	Guiuan Airport	Guiuan	-	RPVG	15	57	126	135	—
62	Pinamalayan Airport	Pinamalayan	-	RPLA	14	98	196	—	—
63	Itbayat Airport	Itbayat	-	RPLT	2	407	438	6	669
—	Jomalig Airport	Jomalig	-	RPLJ			4,253	—	—
—	Subic Bay International Airport	Subic Bay Freeport	SFS	RPLB			—	—	—
—	Alabat Airport	Alabat	-	RPLY			—	—	—
—	Allah Valley Airport	Surallah	AAV	RPMA			—	—	—
—	Bantayan Airport	Bantayan	-	RPSB			—	—	—
—	Bislig Airport	Bislig	BPH	RPMF			—	—	—
—	Borongan Airport	Borongan	-	RPVW		1,330	—	—	—
—	Bulan Airport	Bulan	-	RPUU			—	—	—
—	Bagasbas Airport	Daet	DTE	RPUD			—	—	—
—	Maria Cristina Airport	Iligan	IGN	RPMI			—	—	—
—	Ipil Airport	Ipil	IPE	RPMV		—	—	—	—
—	Liloy Airport	Liloy	-	RPMX		—	—	—	—
—	Malabang Airport	Malabang	MLP	RPMM			—	—	—
—	Wasig Airport	Mansalay	-	RPLG			—	—	—
—	Cagayan de Sulu Airport	Mapun	CDY	RPMU			—	—	—
—	Mati Airport	Mati	MXI	RPMQ			—	—	—
—	Plaridel Airport	Plaridel	-	RPUX			—	—	—
—	Rosales Airport	Rosales	-	RPLR			—	—	—
—	San Fernando Airport	San Fernando (La Union)	SFE	RPUS			—	—	—
—	Siocon Airport	Siocon	XSO	RPNO			—	—	—
—	Sorsogon Airport	Sorsogon	-	RPLZ			—	—	—
—	Ubay Airport	Ubay	-	RPSN			—	—	—
—	Wao Airport	Wao	-	-			—	—	—

== Passenger traffic (2011–2015) ==
2015 rank	Airport name	Area/island served	IATA	ICAO	2015	2014	2013	2012	2011
1	Ninoy Aquino International Airport	Manila	MNL	RPLL	36,681,601	34,094,159	32,866,599	31,878,935	31,558,002
2	Mactan–Cebu International Airport	Cebu	CEB	RPVM	7,781,239	6,839,849	6,996,112	6,771,318	6,215,946
3	Francisco Bangoy International Airport	Davao	DVO	RPMD	4,150,105	3,452,303	2,795,250	2,791,123	2,629,096
4	Kalibo International Airport	Kalibo	KLO	RPVK	2,378,147	2,321,162	2,255,543	1,832,168	1,378,535
5	Iloilo International Airport	Iloilo	ILO	RPVI	1,915,822	1,677,632	1,870,722	1,862,223	1,707,969
6	Laguindingan Airport (from Jun 2013) / Lumbia Airport (till Jun 2013)	Cagayan de Oro	CGY	RPMY / RPML	1,756,445	1,553,346	1,732,518	1,614,157	1,442,959
7	Bacolod–Silay Airport	Bacolod	BCD	RPVB	1,642,391	1,317,841	1,329,299	1,305,790	1,198,637
8	Puerto Princesa International Airport	Puerto Princesa	PPS	RPVP	1,591,718	1,378,580	1,335,825	1,318,766	986,775
9	Daniel Z. Romualdez Airport	Tacloban	TAC	RPVM	1,110,789	863,634	538,727 (Note: Data missing for June–December 2013.)	1,149,592	1,009,575
10	Clark International Airport	Angeles City	CRK	RPLC	868,528	877,757	1,200,592	1,315,757	767,109
11	Zamboanga International Airport	Zamboanga	ZAM	RPMZ	688,781 (Note: Data missing for October–December 2015.)	901,041	796,530	904,668	804,052
12	Tagbilaran Airport	Tagbilaran	TAG	RPVT	776,434	651,837	789,800	734,045	754,911
13	Bancasi Airport	Butuan	BXU	RPME	618,584	514,213	415,262	524,194	385,420
14	General Santos International Airport	General Santos	GES	RPMR	592,311	714,523	688,673	611,274	492,572
15	Legazpi Airport	Legazpi	LGP	RPLP	550,781	483,743	574,776	578,767	514,630
16	Godofredo P. Ramos Airport	Boracay	MPH	RPVE	544,822	507,621	430,305	595,564	732,172
17	Sibulan Airport	Dumaguete	DGT	RPVB	510,316	451,795	464,972	451,112	411,357
18	Francisco B. Reyes Airport	Busuanga	USU	RPVV	260,043	205,251	272,979	107,262 (Note: Data missing for June–December 2012.)	177,709
19	Awang Airport	Cotabato	COT	RPMC	241,642	232,742	239,265	246,209	192,017
20	Roxas Airport	Roxas	RXS	RPVR	227,612	227,583	212,191	217,552	189,681
21	Dipolog Airport	Dipolog	DPL	RPMG	227,459	226,030	227,010	189,200	165,613
22	Labo Airport	Ozamiz	OZC	RPMO	218,985	224,253	302,866	272,850	228,956
23	Laoag International Airport	Laoag	LAO	RPLI	204,550	196,525	243,016	188,048	169,655
24	Pagadian Airport	Pagadian	PAG	RPMP	179,600	150,602	137,778	152,470	117,794
25	Naga Airport	Naga	WNP	RPUN	140,250	148,285	121,099	204,458	168,640
26	Tuguegarao Airport	Tuguegarao	TUG	RPUT	129,889	151,608	141,151	223,907	127,595
27	Surigao Airport	Surigao	SUG	RPMS	100,097	110,389	118,293	119,879	90,026
28	Basco Airport	Basco	BSO	RPUO	73,383	60,683	32,467	25,588	28,428
29	Sanga-Sanga Airport	Tawi-Tawi	TWT	RPMN	72,144	26,922	20,303	—	21,527
30	Cauayan Airport	Cauayan	CYZ	RPUY	60,967	56,831	52,263	44,908	32,928
31	Virac Airport	Virac	VRC	RPUV	52,029	48,304	40,038	37,901	43,279
32	Catarman Airport	Catarman	CRM	RPVF	44,163	33,415	40,507	71,088	67,160
33	Sayak Airport	Siargao	IAO	RPNS	42,179	—	14,972	14,549	7,251
34	San Jose Airport	San Jose (Occidental Mindoro)	SJI	RPUH	40,604	62,108	61,911	108,657	106,465
35	Calbayog Airport	Calbayog	CYP	RPVC	35,742	40,778	32,605	45,186	48,515
36	Lubang Airport	Lubang	LBX	RPLU	31,563	29,155	22,320	8,380	18,422
37	Moises R. Espinosa Airport	Masbate	MBT	RPVJ	31,042	31,448	39,521	62,598	44,805
38	Lingayen Airport	Lingayen	-	RPUG	21,118	20,859	20,259	24,818	16,270
39	Mindoro Airport	Vigan	-	RPUQ	13,661	7,589	8,296	6,671	6,667
40	Iba Airport	Iba	-	RPUI	11,842	—	—	7,685	6,003
41	Tugdan Airport	Tablas	TBH	RPVU	7,304	112	4,634	12,820	18,507
42	Palanan Airport	Palanan	-	RPLN	7,048	—	—	—	3,603
43	Jolo Airport	Jolo	JOL	RPMJ	4,459	15,129	16,411	16,979	72,796
44	Calapan Airport	Calapan	CPP	RPUK	3,573	769	2,160	—	—
45	Plaridel Airport	Plaridel	-	RPUX	2,523 (Note: Data is only for October 2015.)	—	—	—	—
46	Dr. Juan C. Angara Airport	Baler	BQA	RPUR	2,341	—	2,369	998	510
47	Loakan Airport	Baguio	BAG	RPUB	2,224	2,035	2,050	2,271	1,607
48	Mamburao Airport	Mamburao	MBO	RPUM	2,008	—	—	—	1,770
49	Cuyo Airport	Cuyo	CYU	RPLO	1,496	1,603	—	70	478
50	Bagabag Airport	Bagabag	-	RPUZ	266	182	—	123	664
51	Itbayat Airport	Itbayat	-	RPLT	17	882	1,358	3,984	1,400
52	Biliran Airport	Biliran	-	RPVQ	12	—	—	—	—
53	Catbalogan Airport	Catbalogan	-	RPVY	7	—	—	—	—
—	Camiguin Airport	Camiguin	CGM	RPMH	—	8,654	—	—	—
—	Tandag Airport	Tandag	TDG	RPMW	—	5,148	—	—	—
—	San Fernando Airport	San Fernando (La Union)	SFE	RPUS	—	—	18,215	15,378	—
—	Ormoc Airport	Ormoc	OMC	RPVO	—	—	488	365	52
—	Marinduque Airport	Marinduque	MRQ	RPUW	—	—	—	16,372	22,602
—	Bantayan Airport	Bantayan	-	RPSB	—	—	—	1,512	743
—	Siquijor Airport	Siquijor	-	RPVZ	—	—	—	379	344
—	Alabat Airport	Alabat	-	RPLY	—	—	—	—	—
—	Allah Valley Airport	Surallah	AAV	RPMA	—	—	—	—	—
—	Bislig Airport	Bislig	BPH	RPMF	—	—	—	—	—
—	Borongan Airport	Borongan	-	RPVW	—	—	—	—	—
—	Bulan Airport	Bulan	-	RPUU	—	—	—	—	—
—	Bagasbas Airport	Daet	DTE	RPUD	—	—	—	—	—
—	Cagayan de Sulu Airport	Mapun	CDY	RPMU	—	—	—	—	—
—	Evelio Javier Airport	San Jose de Buenavista	EUQ	RPVS	—	—	—	—	—
—	Guiuan Airport	Guiuan	-	RPVG	—	—	—	—	—
—	Hilongos Airport	Hilongos	-	RPVH	—	—	—	—	—
—	Ipil Airport	Ipil	IPE	RPMV	—	—	—	—	—
—	Jomalig Airport	Jomalig	-	RPLJ	—	—	—	—	—
—	Liloy Airport	Liloy	-	RPMX	—	—	—	—	—
—	Malabang Airport	Malabang	MLP	RPMM	—	—	—	—	—
—	Mati Airport	Mati	MXI	RPMQ	—	—	—	—	—
—	Maria Cristina Airport	Iligan	IGN	RPMI	—	—	—	—	—
—	Panan-awan Airport	Maasin	-	RPSM	—	—	—	—	—
—	Pinamalayan Airport	Pinamalayan	-	RPLA	—	—	—	—	—
—	Rosales Airport	Rosales	-	RPLR	—	—	—	—	—
—	Siocon Airport	Siocon	XSO	RPNO	—	—	—	—	—
—	Sorsogon Airport	Sorsogon	-	RPLZ	—	—	—	—	—
—	Subic Bay International Airport	Subic Bay Freeport	SFS	RPLB	—	—	—	—	—
—	Ubay Airport	Ubay	-	RPSN	—	—	—	—	—
—	Wasig Airport	Mansalay	-	RPLG	—	—	—	—	—
—	Wao Airport	Wao	-	-	—	—	—	—	—

== Passenger traffic (2006–2010) ==
2010 rank	Airport name	Area/island served	IATA	ICAO	2010	2009	2008	2007	2006
1	Ninoy Aquino International Airport	Manila	MNL	RPLL	27,321,120	24,108,554	22,253,158	20,693,746	18,229,221
2	Mactan–Cebu International Airport	Cebu	CEB	RPVM	5,413,452	4,762,903	3,991,250	3,731,500	3,070,612
3	Francisco Bangoy International Airport	Davao	DVO	RPMD	2,229,616	1,967,950	1,692,877	1,555,222	1,341,814
4	Iloilo International Airport (from Jun 2007) / Mandurriao Airport (till Jun 2007)	Iloilo	ILO	RPVI	1,581,304	1,324,148	1,073,907	1,002,618	864,403
5	Lumbia Airport	Cagayan de Oro	CGY	RPML	1,301,502	1,110,468	902,184	781,020	606,216
6	Bacolod–Silay Airport (from Jan 2008) / Bacolod Domestic Airport (till Jan 2008)	Bacolod	BCD	RPVB	1,223,491	1,050,429	843,488	785,931	665,144
7	Kalibo International Airport	Kalibo	KLO	RPVK	1,048,288	649,747 (Note: Data missing for May–June 2009.)	400,042	470,169	343,346
8	Daniel Z. Romualdez Airport	Tacloban	TAC	RPVM	859,938	893,297	627,201	511,322	399,885
9	Puerto Princesa International Airport	Puerto Princesa	PPS	RPVP	822,536	587,753	481,756	392,039	284,110
10	Clark International Airport	Angeles City	CRK	RPLC	654,229	590,524	530,429	559,405	489,070
11	Zamboanga International Airport	Zamboanga	ZAM	RPMZ	623,639	582,917	469,540 (Note: Data missing for May 2008.)	485,218	397,910
12	Godofredo P. Ramos Airport	Boracay	MPH	RPVE	623,545	543,222	761,961	548,187	519,044
13	Tagbilaran Airport	Tagbilaran	TAG	RPVT	573,299	562,787	400,814	345,613	241,484
14	General Santos International Airport	General Santos	GES	RPMR	477,535	404,859	302,887	310,233	208,367
15	Legazpi Airport	Legazpi	LGP	RPLP	435,151	420,408	282,409	225,062	146,467
16	Bancasi Airport	Butuan	BXU	RPME	382,843	385,331	308,405	200,346	159,048
17	Sibulan Airport	Dumaguete	DGT	RPVB	363,021	360,515	306,182	276,228	164,244
18	Awang Airport	Cotabato	CBO	RPMC	219,104 (Note: Data missing for December 2010.)	199,133	104,535 (Note: Data missing for ]une–August, October–November 2008.)	127,198	125,539 (Note: Data missing for September 2006.)
19	Labo Airport	Ozamiz	OZC	RPMO	206,428	161,048	80,290 (Note: Data missing for May 2008.)	20,619 (Note: Data missing for December 2007.)	—
20	Roxas Airport	Roxas	RXS	RPVR	203,840	173,132 (Note: Data missing for February 2009.)	115,375	134,712	120,222
21	Dipolog Airport	Dipolog	DPL	RPMG	181,386	188,664	143,819	121,232	69,680 (Note: Data missing for June and September 2006.)
22	Laoag International Airport	Laoag	LAO	RPLI	177,339	135,473	154,319	143,027	128,857
23	Naga Airport	Naga	WNP	RPUN	162,444 (Note: Data missing for January and May 2010.)	125,890	87,168	52,997	50,757
24	Francisco B. Reyes Airport	Busuanga	USU	RPVV	140,660 (Note: Data missing for November–December 2010.)	141,093	51,431 (Note: Data missing for February and August 2008.)	33,673 (Note: Data missing for August–September 2007.)	28,867 (Note: Data missing for March and June 2006.)
25	Tuguegarao Airport	Tuguegarao	TUG	RPUT	116,525	94,350	68,821	38,123	29,814
26	San Jose Airport	San Jose (Occidental Mindoro)	SJI	RPUH	103,175	106,956	63,423	35,389	44,897
27	Surigao Airport	Surigao	SUG	RPMS	90,932	64,928	23,170 (Note: Data missing for May 2008.)	27,402	11,051 (Note: Data missing for February, June–October and December 2006.)
28	Catarman Airport	Catarman	CRM	RPVF	88,051	125,762	22,624	17,235	13,909 (Note: Data missing for January and June 2006.)
29	Calbayog Airport	Calbayog	CYP	RPVC	52,510	62,777	20,616	11,138	8,267 (Note: Data missing for January, May and July 2006.)
30	Moises R. Espinosa Airport	Masbate	MBT	RPVJ	44,068	1,384 (Note: Data missing for July–August 2009.)	23,585	22,859	22,187
31	Virac Airport	Virac	VRC	RPUV	42,573 (Note: Data missing for May 2010.)	62,360	28,946	18,655	17,916
32	Cauayan Airport	Cauayan	CYZ	RPUY	38,906	29,585	10,973	6,397	7,620
33	Ormoc Airport	Ormoc	OMC	RPVO	32,258 (Note: Data missing for December 2010.)	17,800	15,830	1,319	—
34	Basco Airport	Basco	BSO	RPUO	26,089	19,308	24,288	19,550 (Note: Data missing for March 2007.)	22,748
35	Pagadian Airport	Pagadian	PAG	RPMP	26,082	—	—	6,250 (Note: Data missing for June, August and November–December 2007.)	4,431 (Note: Data missing for May–December 2006.)
36	Tugdan Airport	Tablas	TBH	RPVU	17,050	11,795 (Note: Data missing for September 2009.)	7,980	747	10
37	Sanga-Sanga Airport	Tawi-Tawi	TWT	RPMN	14,230	5,539	—	14,489 (Note: Data missing for November–December 2007.)	2,410 (Note: Data missing for May–December 2006.)
38	Lubang Airport	Lubang	LBX	RPLU	13,961 (Note: Data missing for September–November 2010.)	11,039	12,952	11,136	4,277 (Note: Data missing for August and December 2006.)
39	Lingayen Airport	Lingayen	-	RPUG	11,655	20,597	13,217	6,474	1,302
40	Palanan Airport	Palanan	-	RPLN	10,750	5,907	3,383	4,498	5,030 (Note: Data missing for September 2006.)
41	Marinduque Airport	Marinduque	MRQ	RPUW	10,276	15,387	1,099 (Note: Data missing for April–October 2008.)	133	—
42	Jolo Airport	Jolo	JOL	RPMJ	9,931 (Note: Data missing for August 2010.)	9,029 (Note: Data missing for April 2009.)	18,749	14,245 (Note: Data missing for November–December 2007.)	7,331 (Note: Data missing for May–November 2006.)
43	Sayak Airport	Siargao	IAO	RPNS	8,850 (Note: Data missing for September–December 2010.)	10,170	781 (Note: Data missing for May 2008.)	225 (Note: Data missing for May–October and December 2007.)	522 (Note: Data missing for February, June–October and December 2006.)
44	Iba Airport	Iba	-	RPUI	6,826	6,643	10,194	6,474	1,467 (Note: Data missing for August and November 2006.)
45	Mindoro Airport	Vigan	-	RPUQ	6,157 (Note: Data missing for September 2010.)	22,254	47,548	9,365 (Note: Data missing for April 2007.)	2,742
46	Plaridel Airport	Plaridel	-	RPUX	5,326 (Note: Data is only for December 2010.)	222,525	234,098	200,559	22,482
47	Loakan Airport	Baguio	BAG	RPUB	1,784 (Note: Data missing for October 2010.)	2,279	9,805	15,571	18,352
48	Mamburao Airport	Mamburao	MBO	RPUM	1,552	1,201	2,629 (Note: Data missing for January and October 2008.)	343	477
49	Bagabag Airport	Bagabag	-	RPUZ	1,097	953	1,135	788	1,424
50	Dr. Juan C. Angara Airport	Baler	BQA	RPUR	376	994	2,615 (Note: Data missing for January 2008.)	1,121	336 (Note: Data missing for January and September–December 2006.)
51	Siquijor Airport	Siquijor	-	RPVZ	86	—	76	36	117
52	Guiuan Airport	Guiuan	-	RPVG	3	1	358	864	584
—	Subic Bay International Airport	Subic Bay Freeport	SFS	RPLB	—	7,059	10,682	17,648	17,135 (Note: Data missing for April–December 2006.)
—	Calapan Airport	Calapan	CPP	RPUK	—	604	1,188	—	—
—	Cuyo Airport	Cuyo	CYU	RPLO	—	556	1,206 (Note: Data missing for July and October 2008.)	547 (Note: Data missing for January–March, August–September and December 2007.)	173 (Note: Data missing for January–May and July–November 2006.)
—	Allah Valley Airport	Surallah	AAV	RPMA	—	88	238	159	118
—	Pinamalayan Airport	Pinamalayan	-	RPLA	—	74	—	—	—
—	Jomalig Airport	Jomalig	-	RPLJ	—	34	159	215	240
—	Sorsogon Airport	Sorsogon	-	RPLZ	—	4	4	—	2
—	Biliran Airport	Biliran	-	RPVQ	—	2	—	—	—
—	Evelio Javier Airport	San Jose de Buenavista	EUQ	RPVS	—	—	2,381	90	—
—	Camiguin Airport	Camiguin	CGM	RPMH	—	—	1,171	2,173 (Note: Data missing for January, March, June–July, September and November–December 2006.)	3,148 (Note: Data missing for April, June and December 2006.)
—	Itbayat Airport	Itbayat	-	RPLT	—	—	560	71	—
—	Bagasbas Airport	Daet	DTE	RPUD	—	—	300	20	34
—	Hilongos Airport	Hilongos	-	RPVH	—	—	181	163	119
—	Tandag Airport	Tandag	TDG	RPMW	—	—	25	12	4,834
—	Bulan Airport	Bulan	-	RPUU	—	—	4	2	8
—	Maria Cristina Airport	Iligan	IGN	RPMI	—	—	8	38	176
—	Ipil Airport	Ipil	IPE	RPMV	—	—	—	37 (Note: Data missing for August–December 2007.)	32
—	San Fernando Airport	San Fernando (La Union)	SFE	RPUS	—	—	—	—	2,510
—	Alabat Airport	Alabat	-	RPLY	—	—	—	—	—
—	Bantayan Airport	Bantayan	-	RPSB	—	—	—	—	—
—	Bislig Airport	Bislig	BPH	RPMF	—	—	—	—	—
—	Borongan Airport	Borongan	-	RPVW	—	—	—	—	—
—	Cagayan de Sulu Airport	Mapun	CDY	RPMU	—	—	—	—	—
—	Catbalogan Airport	Catbalogan	-	RPVY	—	—	—	—	—
—	Liloy Airport	Liloy	-	RPMX	—	—	—	—	—
—	Malabang Airport	Malabang	MLP	RPMM	—	—	—	—	—
—	Mati Airport	Mati	MXI	RPMQ	—	—	—	—	—
—	Panan-awan Airport	Maasin	-	RPSM	—	—	—	—	—
—	Rosales Airport	Rosales	-	RPLR	—	—	—	—	—
—	Siocon Airport	Siocon	XSO	RPNO	—	—	—	—	—
—	Ubay Airport	Ubay	-	RPSN	—	—	—	—	—
—	Wasig Airport	Mansalay	-	RPLG	—	—	—	—	—

== Passenger traffic (2001–2005) ==
2005 rank	Airport name	Area/island served	IATA	ICAO	2005	2004	2003	2002	2001
1	Ninoy Aquino International Airport	Manila	MNL	RPLL	16,485,178	15,428,521	13,138,535	12,987,980	12,806,628
2	Mactan–Cebu International Airport	Cebu	CEB	RPVM	2,778,664	2,611,762	2,272,782	2,135,216	2,252,733
3	Francisco Bangoy International Airport	Davao	DVO	RPMD	1,347,034	1,151,195	1,004,595	976,431	960,712
4	Mandurriao Airport	Iloilo	ILO	RPVI	708,469	739,584	681,477	677,075 (Note: Data missing for October 2002.)	639,512 (Note: Data missing for June 2001.)
5	Bacolod Airport	Bacolod	BCD	RPVB	563,571	574,125	523,312	514,013	537,809
7	Godofredo P. Ramos Airport	Boracay	MPH	RPVE	521,518	394,693	216,826	181,140 (Note: Data missing for October 2002.)	165,444
6	Lumbia Airport	Cagayan de Oro	CGY	RPML	511,854	545,036	472,457	468,884	457,612
8	Zamboanga International Airport	Zamboanga	ZAM	RPMZ	360,925	353,051	309,331	296,191	270,138 (Note: Data missing for June 2001.)
9	Daniel Z. Romualdez Airport	Tacloban	TAC	RPVM	328,358	289,669 (Note: Data missing for July–August 2004.)	283,573 (Note: Data missing for June 2003.)	303,490	299,295
10	Puerto Princesa International Airport	Puerto Princesa	PPS	RPVP	267,778	271,930	195,975	147,996	189,412
11	Kalibo International Airport	Kalibo	KLO	RPVK	242,183	246,355 (Note: Data missing for January 2004.)	229,850	253,563 (Note: Data missing for October 2002.)	238,123
12	Clark International Airport	Angeles City	CRK	RPLC	232,313	58,988	14,000 (est.)	—	—
13	Tagbilaran Airport	Tagbilaran	TAG	RPVT	198,605	162,862	105,556	77,251	39,268
14	General Santos International Airport	General Santos	GES	RPMR	181,306	151,048 (Note: Data missing for June and August–September 2004.)	186,870	129,945 (Note: Data missing for May–June and October 2002.)	148,204 (Note: Data missing for August and October 2001.)
15	Sibulan Airport	Dumaguete	DGT	RPVB	164,158	131,053 (Note: Data missing for January–March 2004.)	148,649	136,233	138,367
16	Laoag International Airport	Laoag	LAO	RPLI	119,462	134,869	99,867	185,761	108,273
17	Bancasi Airport	Butuan	BXU	RPME	117,944	136,066	121,117	100,564	94,757
18	Legazpi Airport	Legazpi	LGP	RPLP	99,566	100,090	92,123	89,523	76,515 (Note: Data missing for June 2001.)
19	Roxas Airport	Roxas	RXS	RPVR	94,249	75,603 (Note: Data missing for January–March 2004.)	35,554 (Note: Data missing for June–December 2003.)	68,381 (Note: Data missing for August and October 2002.)	80,347 (Note: Data missing for June 2001.)
20	Awang Airport	Cotabato	COT	RPMC	86,920	63,848 (Note: Data missing for July, September and November 2004.)	46,409 (Note: Data missing for March, May–June and October 2003.)	63,292 (Note: Data missing for February and October 2002.)	117,742
21	Dipolog Airport	Dipolog	DPL	RPMG	76,185	74,640	59,397	53,998	50,258
22	San Jose Airport	San Jose (Occidental Mindoro)	SJI	RPUH	41,990	39,746 (Note: Data missing for July 2004.)	40,948	39,005 (Note: Data missing for October 2002.)	32,827 (Note: Data missing for June 2001.)
23	Naga Airport	Naga	WNP	RPUN	37,003	43,906	45,224	45,115	64,084
24	Francisco B. Reyes Airport	Busuanga	USU	RPVV	33,213 (Note: Data missing for January 2005.)	17,422 (Note: Data missing for March–May, July, September and December 2004.)	9,352 (Note: Data missing for April–September and November–December 2003.)	18,607 (Note: Data missing for February–March, August and October 2002.)	23,485 (Note: Data missing for June and October–December 2001.)
25	Tuguegarao Airport	Tuguegarao	TUG	RPUT	31,992 (Note: Data missing for December 2005.)	31,973 (Note: Data missing for May 2004.)	17,786 (Note: Data missing for May and August–November 2003.)	27,000 (Note: Data missing for July and October 2002.)	33,485
26	Moises R. Espinosa Airport	Masbate	MBT	PRVJ	26,535	26,736	26,226	29,038	30,347
27	Basco Airport	Basco	BSO	RPUO	25,376	26,933	26,605 (Note: Data missing for January 2003.)	22,984	22,342
28	Virac Airport	Virac	VRC	RPUV	20,999	21,616	20,037	24,724	26,986
29	Jolo Airport	Jolo	JOL	RPMJ	20,471 (Note: Data missing for April and November 2005.)	15,239	10,651	9,018 (Note: Data missing for February and October 2002.)	3,530
30	Subic Bay International Airport	Subic Bay Freeport	SFS	RPLB	—	—	21,745 (Note: Data missing for March–October 2003.)	18,464 (Note: Data missing for January–May, August and October–November 2002.)	—
31	Loakan Airport	Baguio	BAG	RPUB	19,711	19,368	14,490	14,244	8,923 (Note: Data missing for February–March and July–November 2001.)
32	Cauayan Airport	Cauayan	CYZ	RPUY	7,164	10,805	10,423	18,748	9,254
33	Surigao Airport	Surigao	SUG	RPMS	14,845 (Note: Data missing for April and July–December 2005.)	8,973 (Note: Data missing for January–February, April–May and November–December 2004.)	2,149 (Note: Data missing for April–July and October–December 2003.)	3,571 (Note: Data missing for March–May and September–October 2002.)	4,412
34	Catarman Airport	Catarman	CRM	RPVF	12,755 (Note: Data missing for March and October–December 2005.)	11,424 (Note: Data missing for June–July and November 2004.)	9,787 (Note: Data missing for January and October 2003.)	13,468	11,630 (Note: Data missing for March 2001.)
35	Plaridel Airport	Plaridel	-	RPUX	8,012 (Note: Data missing for February 2005.)	9,527 (Note: Data missing for January–February 2004.)	11,415	12,398	6,889 (Note: Data missing for May–June 2001.)
36	Sanga-Sanga Airport	Tawi-Tawi	TWT	RPMN	8,770 (Note: Data missing for April, June and November–December 2005.)	6,342 (Note: Data missing for January–February and June–July 2004.)	5,695 (Note: Data missing for February and June 2003.)	5,031 (Note: Data missing for October 2002.)	231
37	Tandag Airport	Tandag	TDG	RPMW	7,100	5,061	2,589	2,384 (Note: Data missing for February and October 2002.)	802
38	Palanan Airport	Palanan	-	RPLN	5,051	7,143	9,463	8,876 (Note: Data missing for October 2002.)	7,869
39	Lubang Airport	Lubang	LBX	RPLU	4,920 (Note: Data missing for October 2005.)	5,504 (Note: Data missing for January–February 2004.)	7,125	5,086 (Note: Data missing for October 2002.)	3,519 (Note: Data missing for January, May–June and August 2001.)
40	Camiguin Airport	Camiguin	CGM	RPMH	3,387 (Note: Data missing for January, March, June and December 2005.)	1,566 (Note: Data missing for January–February, April–May and November–December 2004.)	1,619 (Note: Data missing for May, August, October and December 2003.)	1,300 (Note: Data missing for February, April–May and September–October 2002.)	980 (Note: Data missing for June, August and October–November 2001.)
41	Calbayog Airport	Calbayog	CYP	RPVC	3,269 (Note: Data missing for January–February, April–August and November–December 2005.)	5,264 (Note: Data missing for January, April–August and November 2004.)	14,539	12,015	10,598 (Note: Data missing for February 2001.)
42	San Fernando Airport	San Fernando (La Union)	SFE	RPUS	2,354	—	—	—	—
43	Mindoro Airport	Vigan	-	RPUQ	2,904	962	952	547	892
44	Pagadian Airport	Pagadian	PAG	RPMP	1,792	360	134	2,695	2,881
45	Tugdan Airport	Tablas	TBH	RPVU	1,345	933	130	573 (Note: Data missing for October 2002.)	346
46	Bagabag Airport	Bagabag	-	RPUZ	1,054	1,158	2,706 (Note: Data missing for January 2003.)	3,119	3,448
47	Cuyo Airport	Cuyo	CYU	RPLO	901	1,279 (Note: Data missing for April–July and October 2004.)	1,334 (Note: Data missing for January–March, May and December 2003.)	2,120 (Note: Data missing for February, June, August and October 2002.)	707 (Note: Data missing for January–February, August and November–December 2001.)
48	Iba Airport	Iba	-	RPUI	847	974	1,232 (Note: Data missing for January 2003.)	3,654 (Note: Data missing for October 2002.)	4,936
49	Sayak Airport	Siargao	IAO	RPNS	755	460	507 (Note: Data missing for February, April–July and October–December 2003.)	355	608
50	Lingayen Airport	Lingayen	-	RPUG	750	830	665	839	649
51	Marinduque Airport	Marinduque	MRQ	RPUW	589 (Note: Data missing for January–May and August–December 2005.)	1,207 (Note: Data missing for March–July and September–December 2004.)	3,277 (Note: Data missing for November–December 2003.)	2,648 (Note: Data missing for October 2002.)	3,342 (Note: Data missing for November–December 2001.)
52	Jomalig Airport	Jomalig	-	RPLJ	373	378	38	396	14
53	Allah Valley Airport	Surallah	AAV	RPMA	272	248	42	4	71
54	Mamburao Airport	Mamburao	MBO	RPUM	264	1,049	405	544 (Note: Data missing for October 2002.)	334 (Note: Data missing for January, March and December 2001.)
55	Calapan Airport	Calapan	CPP	RPUK	257	—	69 (Note: Data missing for February–December 2003.)	613	473 (Note: Data missing for April 2001.)
56	Guiuan Airport	Guiuan	-	RPVG	172	48	72	45	30
57	Maria Cristina Airport	Iligan	IGN	RPMI	170	—	—	—	2
58	Baler Airport	Baler	BQA	RPUR	168	243	10	—	—
59	Hilongos Airport	Hilongos	-	RPVH	81	39	81	98	124
60	Ipil Airport	Ipil	IPE	RPMV	76	332	212	1,048	919
61	Siquijor Airport	Siquijor	-	RPVZ	36	121 (Note: Data missing for August–December 2004.)	334	422	152
62	Labo Airport	Ozamiz	OZC	RPMO	39	238	94	318	184
63	Bulan Airport	Bulan	-	RPUU	20	62	—	6	—
64	Cagayan de Sulu Airport	Mapun	CDY	RPMU	15	46	26	—	—
65	Sorsogon Airport	Sorsogon	-	RPLZ	12	28	77	6	52
66	Liloy Airport	Liloy	-	RPMX	2	56	28	18	9
—	Evelio Javier Airport	San Jose de Buenavista	EUQ	RPVS	—	2,834 (Note: Data missing for January–March and August–October 2004.)	—	74	—
—	Siocon Airport	Siocon	XSO	RPNO	—	477	573	144	15
—	Bagasbas Airport	Daet	DTE	RPUD	—	51	—	—	—
—	Rosales Airport	Rosales	-	RPLR	—	28	—	15	4
—	Mati Airport	Mati	MXI	RPMQ	—	—	691	—	—
—	Catbalogan Airport	Catbalogan	-	RPVY	—	—	8	8	1
—	Alabat Airport	Alabat	-	RPLY	—	—	5	4	—
—	Pinamalayan Airport	Pinamalayan	-	RPLA	—	—	—	849	x
—	Ormoc Airport	Ormoc	OMC	RPVO	—	—	—	464	808
—	Biliran Airport	Biliran	-	RPVQ	—	—	—	1	5
—	Itbayat Airport	Itbayat	-	RPLT	—	—	—	—	2,111
—	Wasig Airport	Mansalay	-	RPLG	—	—	—	—	28
—	Bislig Airport	Bislig	BPH	RPMF	—	—	—	—	—
—	Borongan Airport	Borongan	-	RPVW	—	—	—	—	—
—	Malabang Airport	Malabang	MLP	RPMM	—	—	—	—	—
—	Panan-awan Airport	Maasin	-	RPSM	—	—	—	—	—
—	Ubay Airport	Ubay	-	RPSN	—	—	—	—	—
—	Lucena Airport	Lucena	-	~~RPUE~~	x	x	3	597 (Note: Data missing for October 2002.)	33
—	Malaybalay Airport	Malaybalay	-	~~RPMY~~	x	x	x	x	—

== Gallery ==
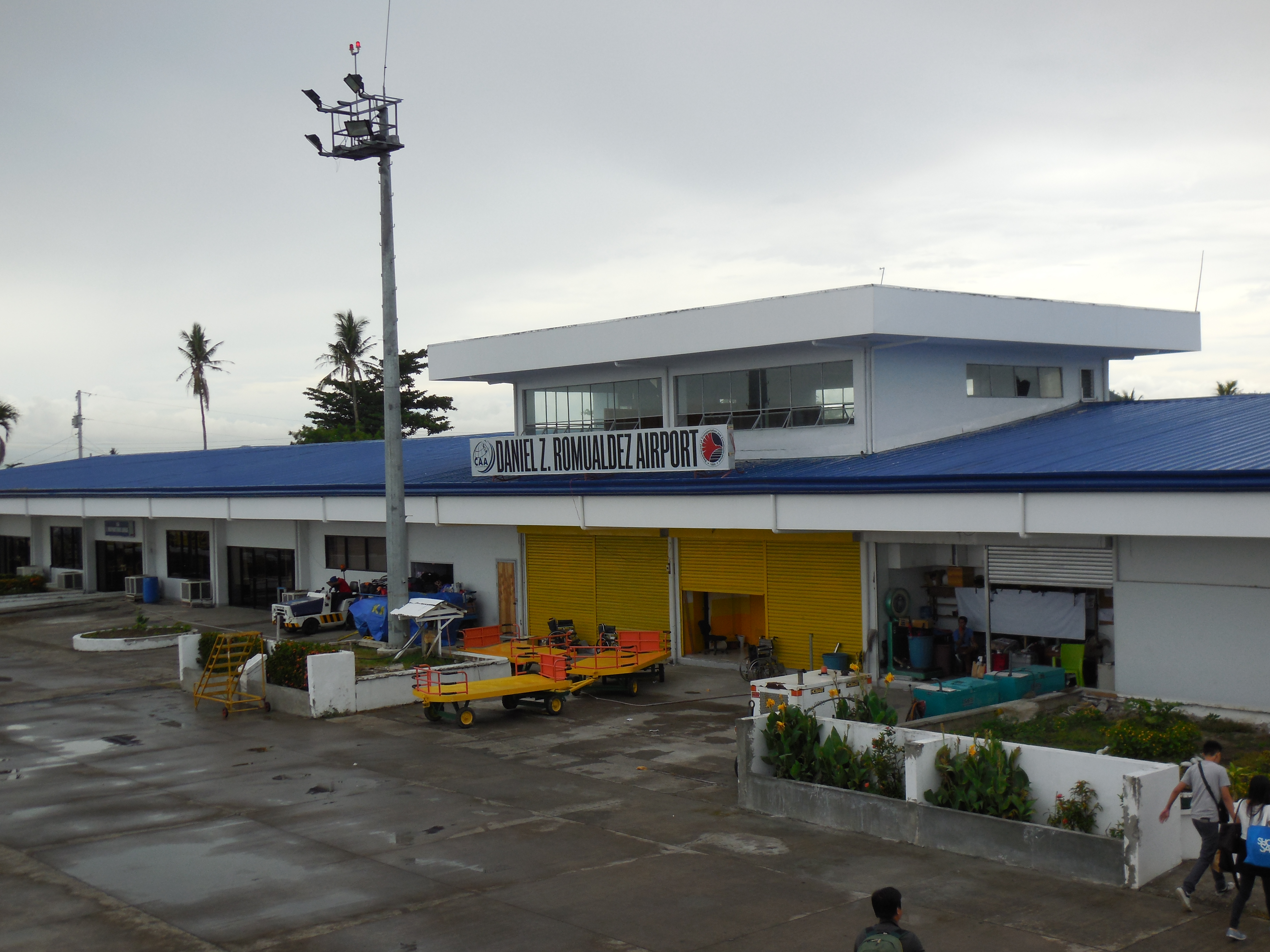
Passenger terminal building of Daniel Z. Romualdez Airport

Passenger terminal building of Clark International Airport

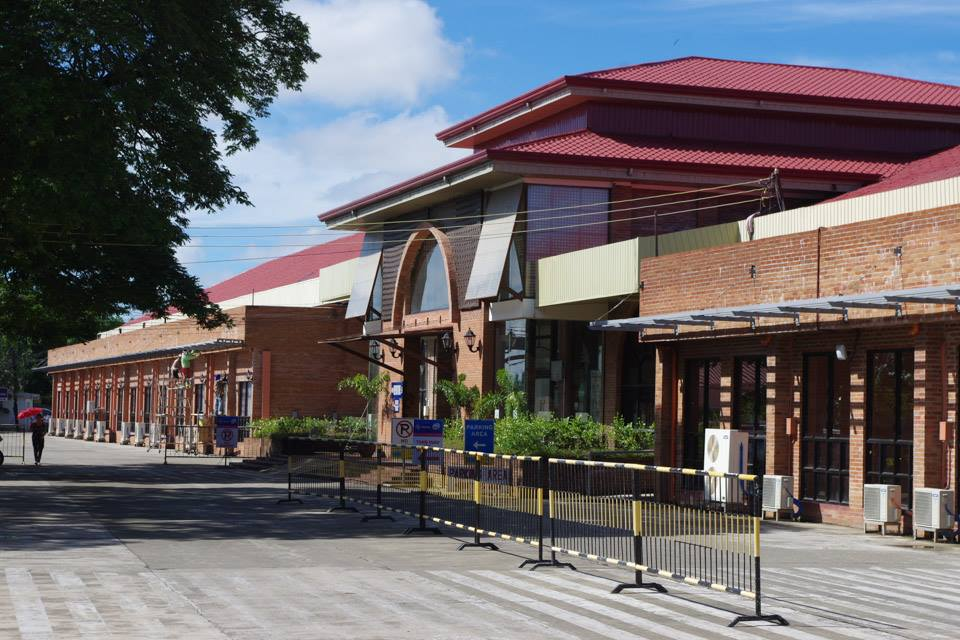
Passenger terminal building of Laoag International Airport

Interior of Puerto Princesa International Airport's terminal

Passenger terminal building of Iloilo International Airport

Interior of the Iloilo Airport passenger terminal

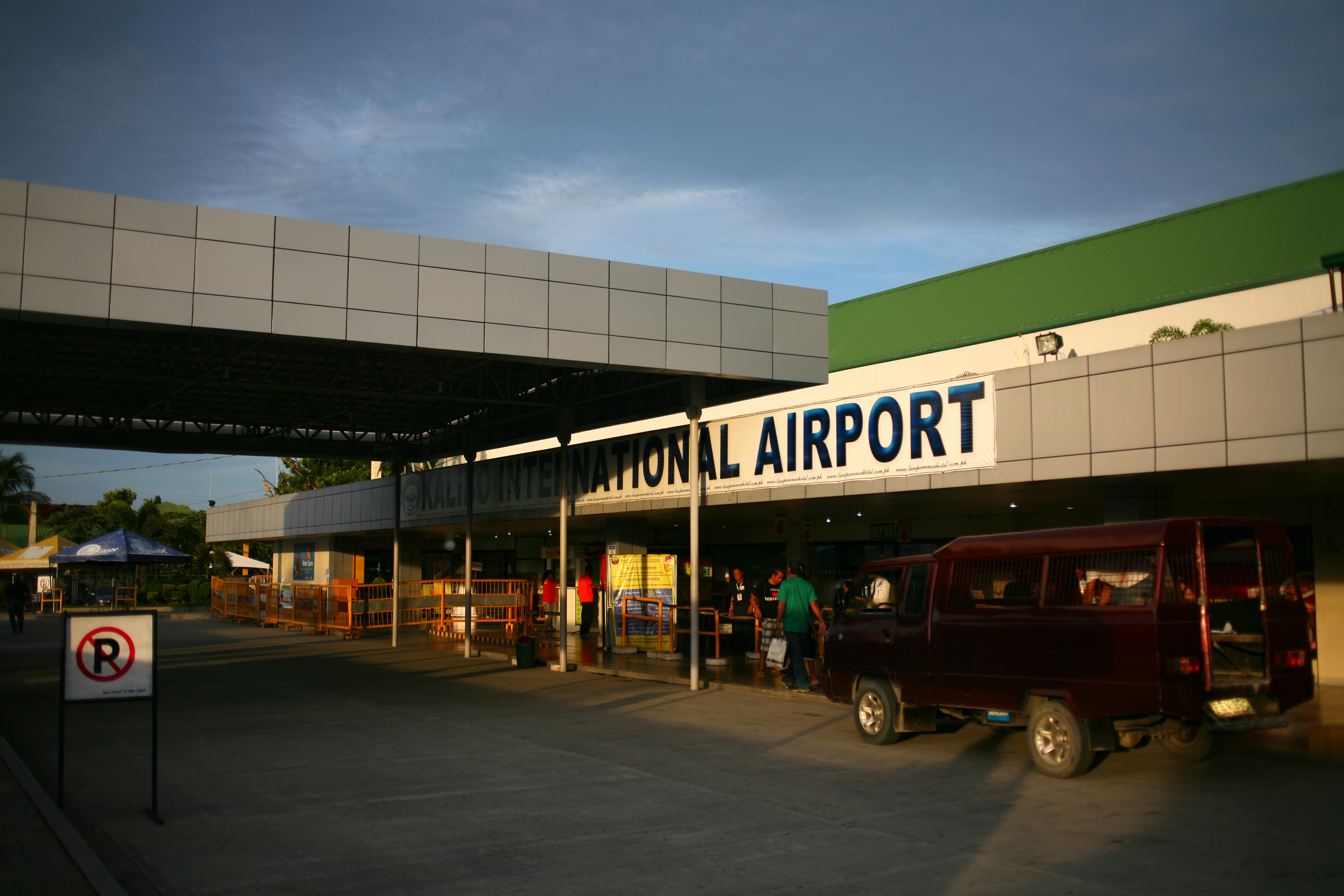
Exterior of Kalibo International Airport's terminal

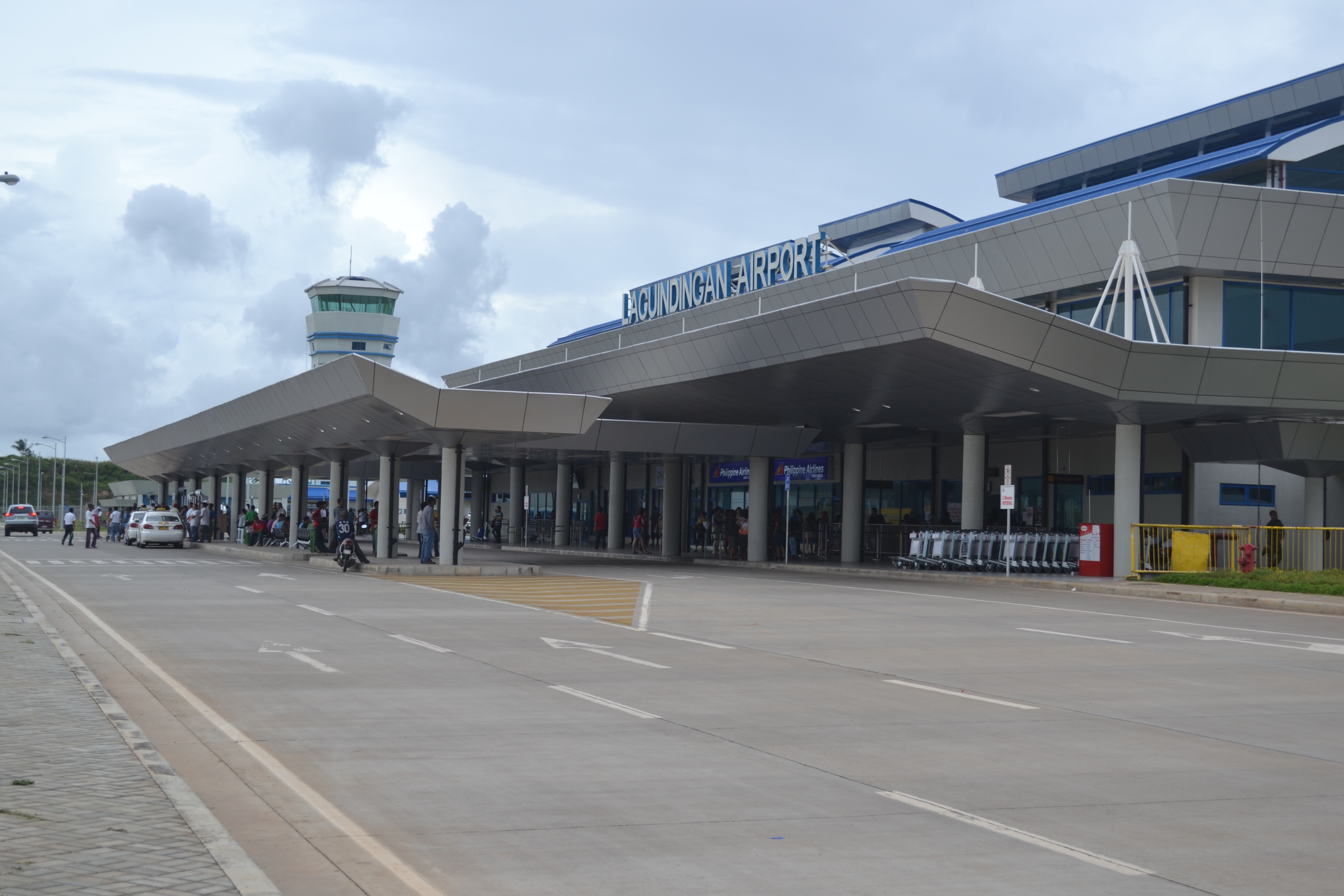
Passenger terminal building of Laguindingan Airport

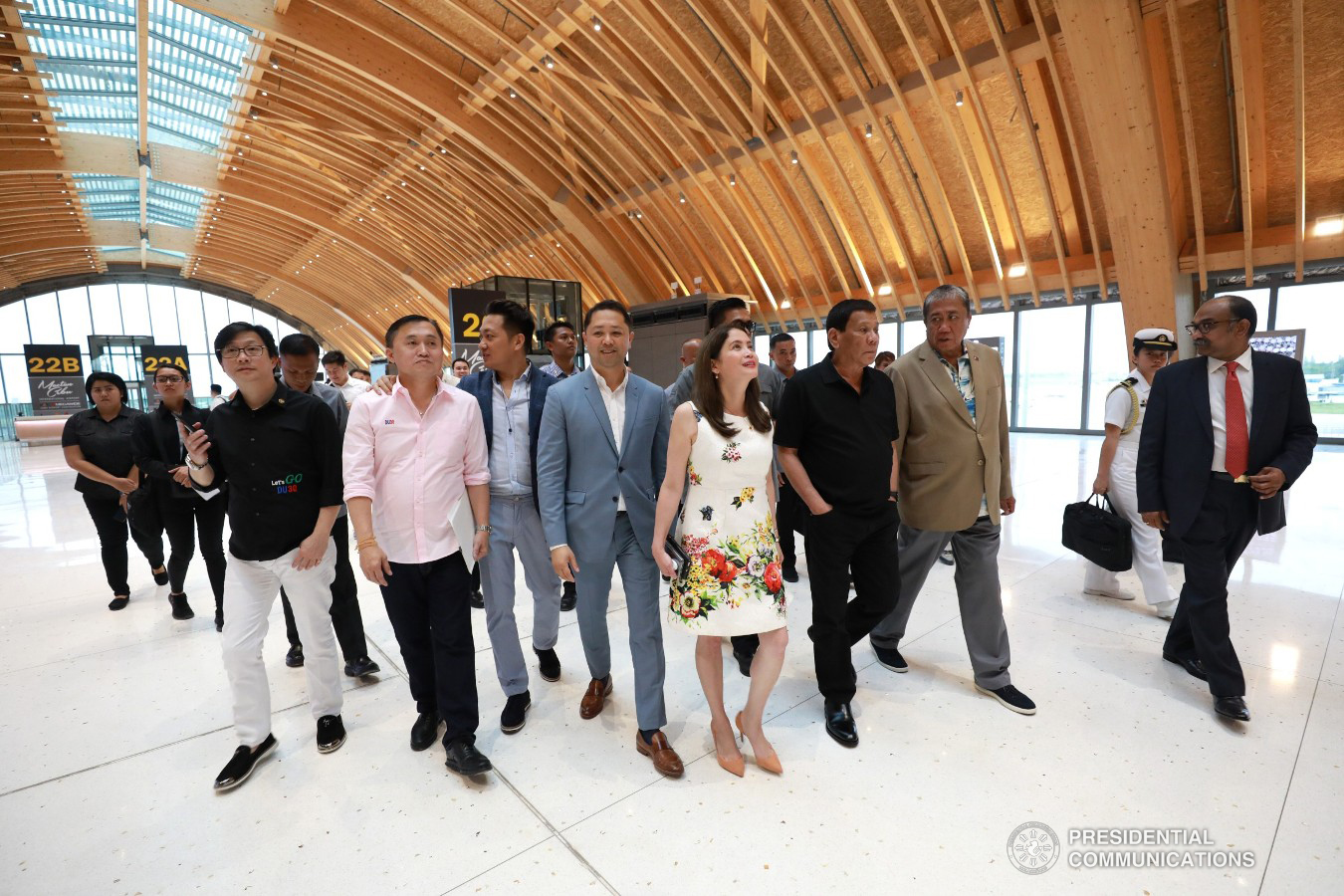
Interior of Mactan–Cebu International Airport, being toured by President Rodrigo Roa Duterte

Inside the terminal at Francisco Bangoy International Airport

== See also ==
- List of airports in the Philippines
