= Bantayan =

Bantayan may refer to:

- Bantayan Island, an island in the Philippines which is a part of Cebu province
  - Bantayan, Cebu, the titular largest municipality on the island
  - Bantayanon language, a language spoken on the island, closely related to Hiligaynon
  - Bantayan Airport (ICAO code: RPSB)
- King Bantayan, a fictional character from the 2005 fantasy film Exodus: Tales from the Enchanted Kingdom
- Bantayan, a civil structure in Morong, Rizal, Philippines

== See also ==
- Bentayan (state constituency), Johor, Malaysia
