= Biliran (disambiguation) =

Biliran is an island province in Eastern Visayas, Philippines. It may refer also to the following places in the Philippines:

- Biliran, Biliran, municipality in the province
- Biliran (volcano), the major volcano of the island province
- Biliran Airport, airport in the province
