= Bangsamoro Airport Authority =

Agency overview
- Agency executive: Atty. Ranibai D. Dilangalen, Director I
- Parent department: Ministry of Transportation and Communications
- Website: motc.bangsamoro.gov.ph/baa-barmm

Bangsamoro Airport Authority (BAA) is a regional civil aviation body under the Bangsamoro autonomous region's Ministry of Transportation and Communications. It is tasked to oversee the landside operation of airports in Bangsamoro. It is also run under the supervision of the Civil Aviation Authority of the Philippines (CAAP), the civil aviation authority of the Philippines, which maintains the airside operations of all airports in the country including those in Bangsamoro.

On September 20, 2022, a memorandum of agreement was signed between the MOTC and the CAAP where the two entities agreed upon the transfer of the landside management of six airports in Bangsamoro from the latter to the former. The transfer was made effective by January 10, 2023, when the airports were placed under the jurisdiction of the Bangsamoro's Ministry of Transportation and Communications.

== Airports ==
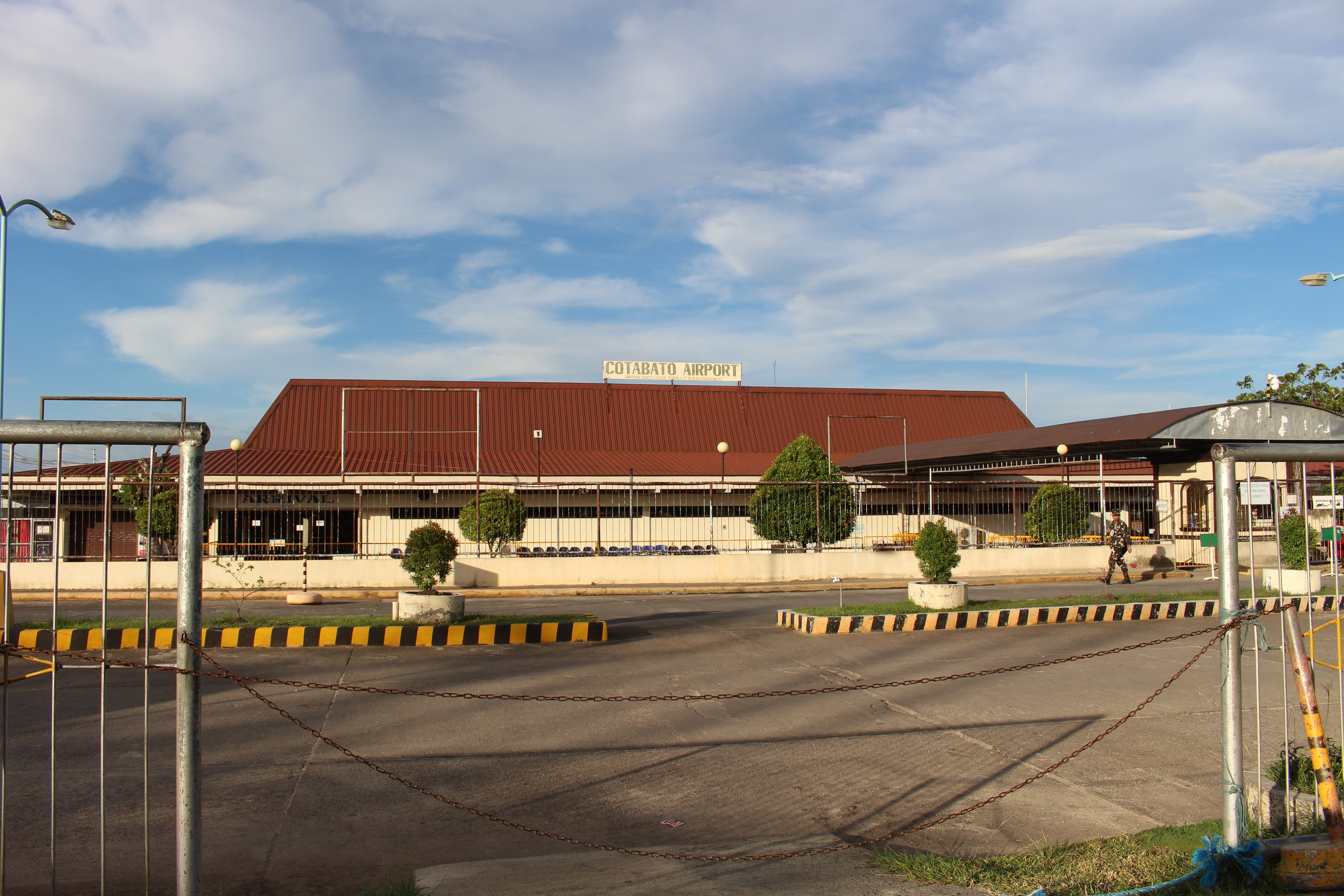
Cotabato (Awang) Airport

The landside operations of the following airports is managed by the Bangsamoro Airport Authority. Landside includes an airport's passenger terminal building, administrative building, vehicular parking area, and other non-restricted areas. This excludes "airside" operations which covers facilities and areas involving air navigation which includes runways and taxiways.

Current

- Malabang Airport – Malabang, Lanao del Sur (non-operational)
- Wao Airport – Wao, Lanao del Sur (non-operational)
- Cotabato Airport (Awang) Datu Odin Sinsuat, Maguindanao del Norte
- Jolo Airport – Jolo, Sulu
- Sanga-Sanga Airport – Bongao, Tawi-Tawi
- Cagayan de Sulu Airport – Mapun, Tawi-Tawi

Planned

- Cotabato international airport – Sultan Mastura, Maguindanao del Norte
