= Cagayan de Sulu Airport =

Cagayan de Sulu Airport Landing sin Cagayan de Sulu
- IATA: CDY; ICAO: RPMU

Summary
- Airport type: Public
- Operator: Civil Aviation Authority of the Philippines (airside and landside); Bangsamoro Airport Authority (landside)
- Serves: Mapun, Tawi-Tawi
- Location: Mapun, Tawi-Tawi
- Elevation AMSL: 98 ft / 30 m
- Coordinates: 07°00′49″N 118°29′42″E

Map
- Location in the Philippines

Runways
Direction	Length		Surface
Direction	ft	m	Surface
13/31	4,265	1,300	Macadam
- Statistics from the Development Plan for the Bangsamoro Final Report, August 2016

Cagayan de Sulu Airport (Tausug: Landing sin Cagayan de Sulu) (IATA: CDY, ICAO: RPMU) is an airport serving the island municipality of Mapun (formerly named Cagayan de Sulu), Tawi-Tawi, Philippines. The Civil Aviation Authority of the Philippines classifies this facility as a community airport.

Though no airlines currently serve the airport, it sees some use by the military.
