= Panan-awan Airport =

Airport in Maasin, Philippines

Pananawan Airport Paliparan ng Panan-awan Tugpahanan sa Panan-awan Luparan han Panan-awan
- IATA: none; ICAO: RPSM

Summary
- Airport type: Public
- Operator: Civil Aviation Authority of the Philippines
- Serves: Maasin
- Location: Barangay Panan-awan, Maasin
- Elevation AMSL: 100 m / 328 ft
- Coordinates: 10°11′13.46″N 124°47′0.28″E
- Interactive map of Pananawan Airport

Runways
| Direction | Length | | Surface |
| Direction | m | ft | Surface |
|---|---|---|---|
| 16/34 | 1,200 | 3,937 | Asphalt |

Panan-awan Airport (Filipino: Paliparan ng Panan-awan, Cebuano: Tugpahanan sa Panan-awan, Waray-Waray: Luparan han Panan-awan) (ICAO: RPSM), also known as Maasin Airport, is an airport serving the general area of Maasin, the provincial capital city of Southern Leyte in the Philippines. It is the only existing airport in Southern Leyte. The airport is classified as a feeder airport by the Civil Aviation Authority of the Philippines, a body of the Department of Transportation that is responsible for the operations of not only this airport but also of all other airports in the Philippines except the major international airports. The airport derives its name from its location, being located in Barangay Panan-awan in Maasin.

== Expansion and Renovation ==
In 2009 it was announced that The Department of Transportation and Communications had allocated ₱40 million for the expansion of the runway. A further ₱50 million has been requested for the terminal building

In 2018, the airport is set to receive additional infrastructure development funds of ₱122 million.
