= Ubay Airport =

Ubay Airport Tugpahanan sa Ubay Paliparan ng Ubay
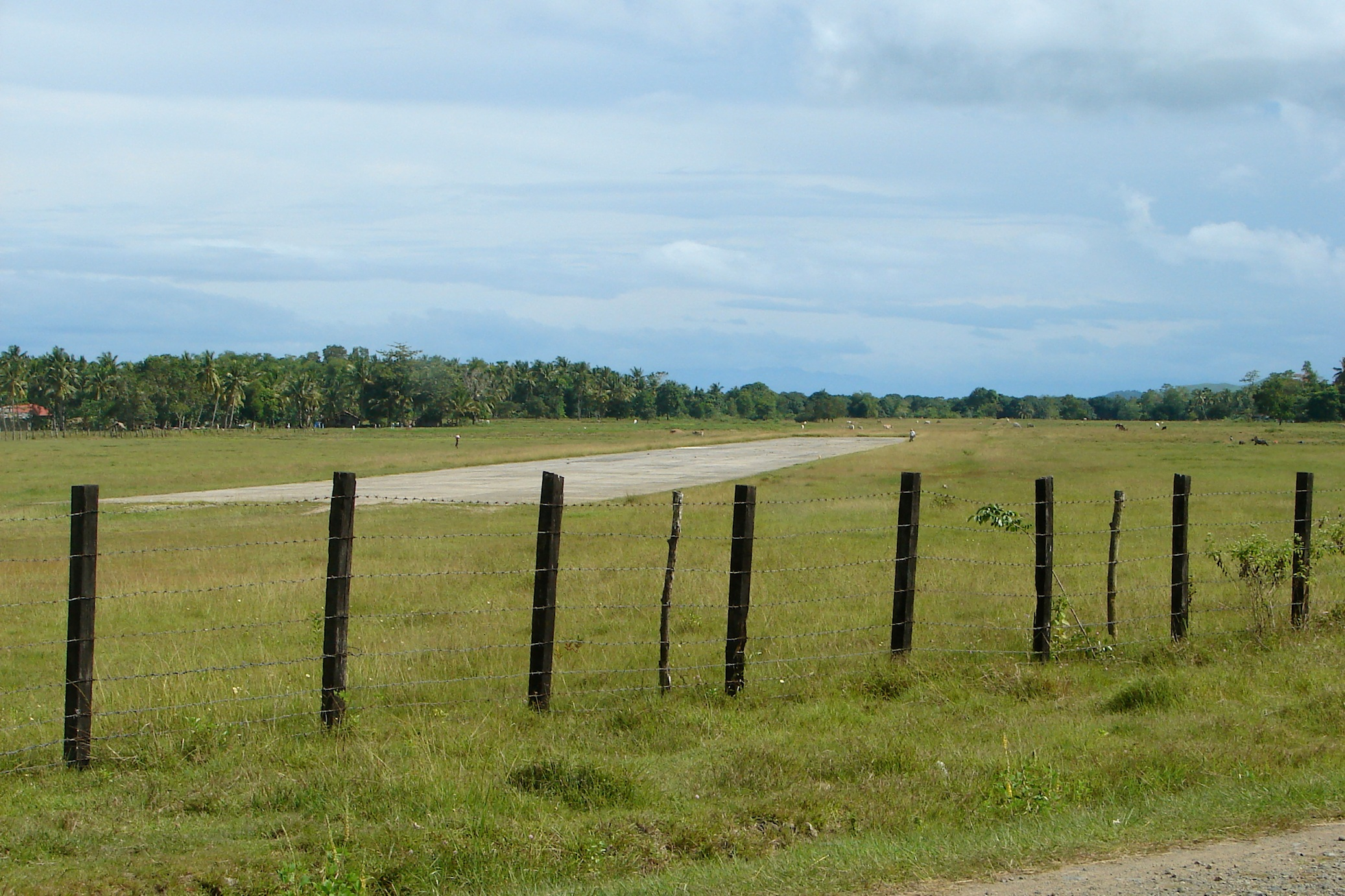
- IATA: none; ICAO: RPSN

Summary
- Airport type: Public
- Operator: Civil Aviation Authority of the Philippines
- Serves: Ubay
- Location: Barangay Camambugan, Ubay, Bohol
- Elevation AMSL: 2 m / 7 ft
- Coordinates: 10.0581°N 124.4239°E

Map
- Location in the Philippines

Runways
Direction	Length		Surface
Direction	m	ft	Surface
06/24	400	1,312	Concrete
- Source: DAFIF

Ubay Airport (Cebuano: Tugpahanan sa Ubay, Filipino: Paliparan ng Ubay) (ICAO: RPSN, formerly ~~RPBY~~) is an airport serving the general area of Ubay, located in the province of Bohol in the Philippines. The airport has no scheduled service, nor any facilities.

It is one of two airports in Bohol, the other being Bohol–Panglao International Airport in the western half of the province. The 54 hectares (130 acres) airport is classified as a community airport by the Civil Aviation Authority of the Philippines, an attached agency of the Department of Transportation that is responsible for the operations of not only this airport but also of all other airports in the Philippines except the major international airports.

The airport was originally built by the Americans before World War II, used during the war, and since then by light planes only.

Three Bohol congressmen, Erico Aumentado, Arthur Yap and Rene Relampagos, united to promote the development of the airport in order to accommodate commercial domestic and aviation training flights. In 2010, they filed House Bill No. 2437 which asserted that "the airport, once upgraded, can accommodate domestic flights to spur tourism, commerce and industry in the Northeastern Corridor of Bohol and balance the economic development in the province which is heavily tilted to Tagbilaran City and Panglao Island." The surrounding flat rural terrain would be ideal for airport expansion and allow the runway to be extended even up to 3,000 metres (9,800 ft).
