= Bislig Airport =

Bislig Airport Paliparan ng Bislig Tugpahanan sa Bislig Tugpahanan sang Bislig
- IATA: BPH; ICAO: RPMF

Summary
- Airport type: Public
- Owner/Operator: Civil Aviation Authority of the Philippines
- Serves: Bislig
- Location: Bislig, Surigao del Sur
- Elevation AMSL: 4 m (13 ft)
- Coordinates: 08°11′45″N 126°19′19″E

Map
- Location in the Philippines

Runways
| Direction | Length | | Surface |
| Direction | m | ft | Surface |
|---|---|---|---|
| 05/23 | 1,200 | 3,937 | Asphalt |
- Source: DAFIF

Bislig Airport (IATA: BPH, ICAO: RPMF) is an airport serving the general area of Bislig, located in the province of Surigao del Sur in the Philippines. The airport is classified as a community airport by the Civil Aviation Authority of the Philippines. The airport first had operations with the Philippine Airlines in 1981 with a Cebu to Bislig route. In October 2019, the Leading Edge Air Services Corporation (LEASCOR) started a Bislig to Cebu vice versa route until January 2020. On September 20, 2024, LEASCOR started operating a Cebu to Bislig vice versa flight twice a week. The airport, according to the Philippine Information Agency and local officials, could possibly contribute to Bislig's tourism and economy and helped lessen travel times for local residents.

== History ==
An act that was accepted on December 22, 1978, appropriated funds to numerous infrastructure projects in the Philippines, allocating 10,000,000 PHP to Bislig Airport. In October 2019, LEASCOR started a Bislig-Cebu vice versa route, lasting until January 2020. After negotiations with LEASCOR, the city government of Bislig announced on August 18, 2024, that direct flights from Cebu to Bislig would continue on September 20.

The first flight after the route's reinstation, using an ATR 72-500, launched from Cebu at 06:00 PHT (22:00 UTC the previous day) and landed at Bislig at 07:17 PHT (23:17 UTC the previous day). Several aviation officials attended the aircraft landing at Bislig, such as Bislig Airport Officer in Charge Lendon Dean D. Nacario, Acting CAAP Area XII Head Engr. Junelito Abrazado, and representatives from the CAAP. Other officials present were Bislig Mayor Florencio C. Garay, Vice Mayor Alfredo Carmelo, and city councilors. The return flight left Bislig at 08:00 PHT (00:00 UTC) and arrived in Cebu at 09:47 PHT (01:49 UTC). The route will operate twice a week, on Fridays and Saturdays. In the City Government's Facebook post on the maiden flight, the event "signaled a bright future for Bislig City’s development and connectivity." On October 23, 2024, officials from Bislig City visited Borongan Airport to replicate how Borongan operates flights despite limited resources.

== Reception and impact ==
According to Nida Grace P. Barcena of the Philippine Information Agency, through flights from the airport, people from Bislig would not need to travel to Butuan or Davao City to go to Cebu, with flights possibly leading more tourists and businessmen to the city. City officials also expressed confidence that flights would contribute to local tourism and help the city's economy. Barcena concluded her article describing the reinstated LEASCOR flights as "a major leap forward in [Bislig City's] journey toward greater prominence on the national stage."

== Airlines and destinations ==
| Airlines | Destinations |
|---|---|
| LEASCOR | Cebu |

== See also ==
- List of airports in the Philippines
