= Rosales Airport =

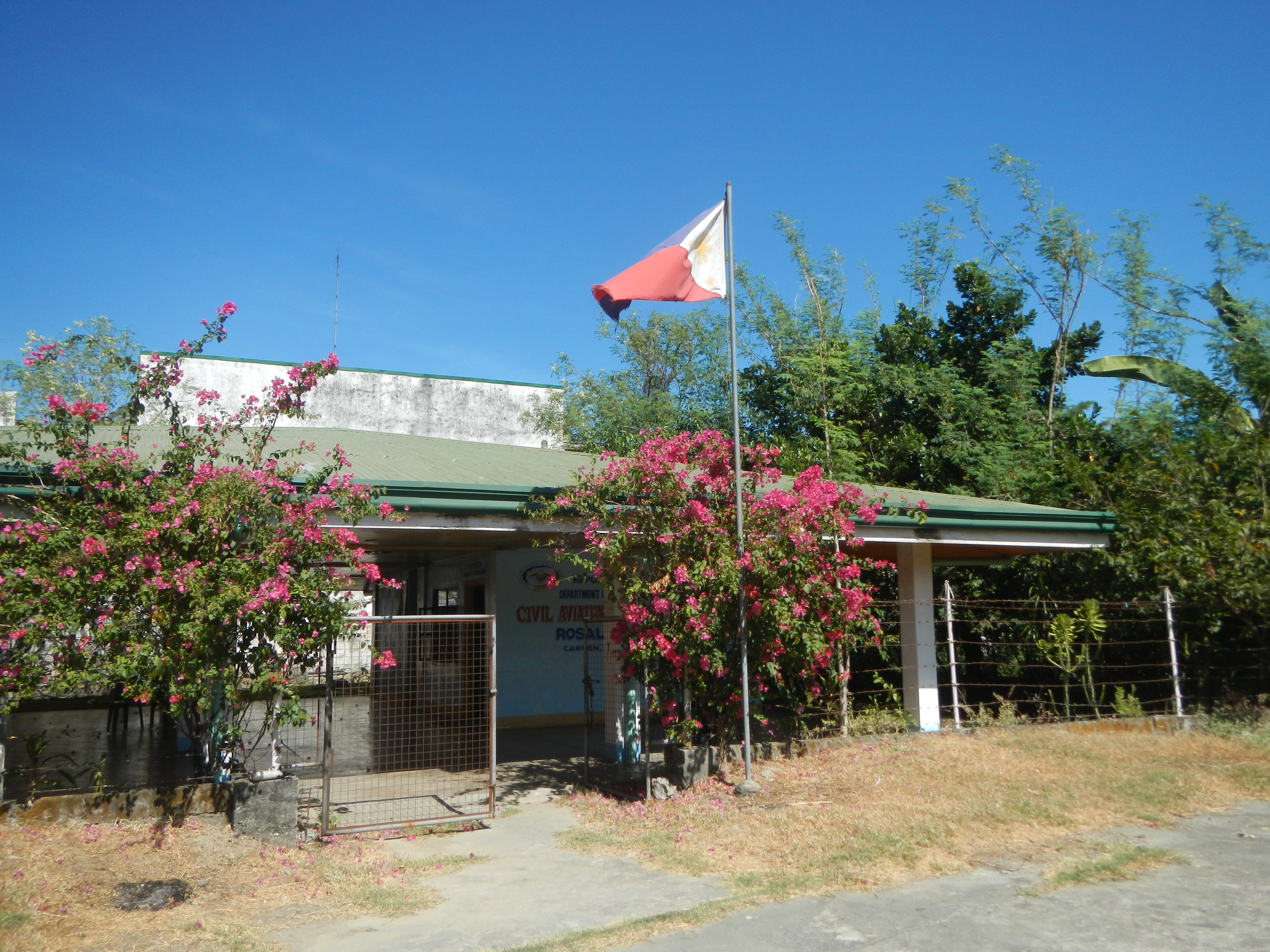
- IATA: none; ICAO: RPLR

Summary
- Owner/Operator: Civil Aviation Authority of the Philippines
- Serves: Pangasinan
- Location: Rosales, Pangasinan
- Coordinates: 15°53′06″N 120°36′17″E
- Interactive map of Rosales Airport

Statistics
- None

Rosales Airport is an airfield located in Rosales, Pangasinan, in the Philippines. It is listed by the Civil Aviation Authority of the Philippines for the operation of rotary aircraft only. The airfield was constructed in October 1941, on the eve of the Japanese invasion of the Philippines, initially as a dirt landing strip. Before and after the occupation of Clark Air Base by the Japanese, Rosales acted as a secondary airfield for U.S. Air Force aircraft stationed there. Its gravel runway has a length of 1,043 metres (3,422 ft).
