= Vigan Airport =

Airport serving Vigan, Ilocos Sur, Philippines

Vigan Airport Pagtayaban ti Vigan Paliparan ng Vigan
- IATA: none; ICAO: RPUQ

Summary
- Airport type: Public
- Operator: Civil Aviation Authority of the Philippines
- Serves: Vigan
- Location: Barangay Mindoro, Vigan, Ilocos Sur, Philippines
- Elevation AMSL: 10.3 m (34 ft)
- Coordinates: 17°33′17″N 120°21′22″E

Map
- Location in the Philippines

Runways
Direction	Length		Surface
Direction	m	ft	Surface
02/20	1,045	3,429	Asphalt

Statistics (2008)
- Passengers: 47,548
- Aircraft movements: 25,244
- Statistics from the Civil Aviation Authority of the Philippines.

Vigan Airport (Note: Ilocano: Pagtayaban ti Vigan, Filipino: Paliparan ng Vigan) (ICAO: RPUQ), also known as Mindoro Airport, is an airport serving the general area of Vigan, the capital of the province of Ilocos Sur, located in the province of Ilocos Sur in the Philippines. The airport is the only one located in Ilocos Sur, at Barangay Mindoro (and not on the island of Mindoro).

It is classified as a community airport by the Civil Aviation Authority of the Philippines, the part of the Department of Transportation that is responsible for the operations of all airports in the Philippines except the major international airports.

Previously, the airport was considered by the city government as a "sleeping asset", since no revenue was generated from its operations. Plans were made by the city to expand and modernize the airport, in part to lighten the burden of traveling to Vigan from Manila and other cities and towns by bus, as well as to develop the city's burgeoning tourism industry.

On March 19, 2009, Interisland Airlines began flying between the airport and Manila, but was discontinued after a few months due to low demand.

In February 2017, the airport re-opened for commercial flights after eight years of private use. Platinum Skies, controlled by former Ilocos Sur governor Chavit Singson, began flights between Vigan and Manila on February 17, 2017 and between Vigan and Basco starting April 2017.

In around 2020s, ABS-CBN's program, FPJ's Ang Probinsyano shot some scenes in the Airport

On May 25, 2022, the Department of Transportation (DOTr) and the Civil Aviation Authority of the Philippines (CAAP) inaugurated the completed Vigan Airport development projects includes the improved the Passenger Terminal Building, including the arrival and pre-departure areas and the construction of the airport’s Administrative Building, a powerhouse, and the provision of runaway features. This increased the capacity of Vigan Airport’s previous capacity of only 40 to 150 passengers.

== Airlines and destinations ==
Airlines	Destinations
Platinum Skies	Basco, Manila
