= Lubang Airport =

Lubang Airport Paliparan ng Lubang
- IATA: LBX; ICAO: RPLU

Summary
- Airport type: Public
- Operator: Civil Aviation Authority of the Philippines
- Serves: Lubang Island, Looc
- Location: Lubang, Occidental Mindoro
- Elevation AMSL: 13 m / 43 ft
- Coordinates: 13°51′27″N 120°6′29″E
- Interactive map of Lubang Airport

Runways
Direction	Length		Surface
Direction	m	ft	Surface
07/25	1,210	3,969	Asphalt

Lubang Airport (Filipino: Paliparan ng Lubang; IATA: LBX, ICAO: RPLU) is an airport that serves the general area of Lubang Island, located in the province of Occidental Mindoro in the Philippines. It is the only airport on the island; however, it is one of three airports in the province. The airport is classified as a community airport by the Civil Aviation Authority of the Philippines, a body of the Department of Transportation that is responsible for the operations of not only this airport but also of all other airports in the Philippines except major international airports.
