= Allah Valley Airport =

Airport in Surallah, South Cotabato, Philippines

Allah Valley Airport Hulugpaan sang Datag sang Allah Tugpahanan sa Bingawog sa Allah Paliparan ng Lambak ng Allah
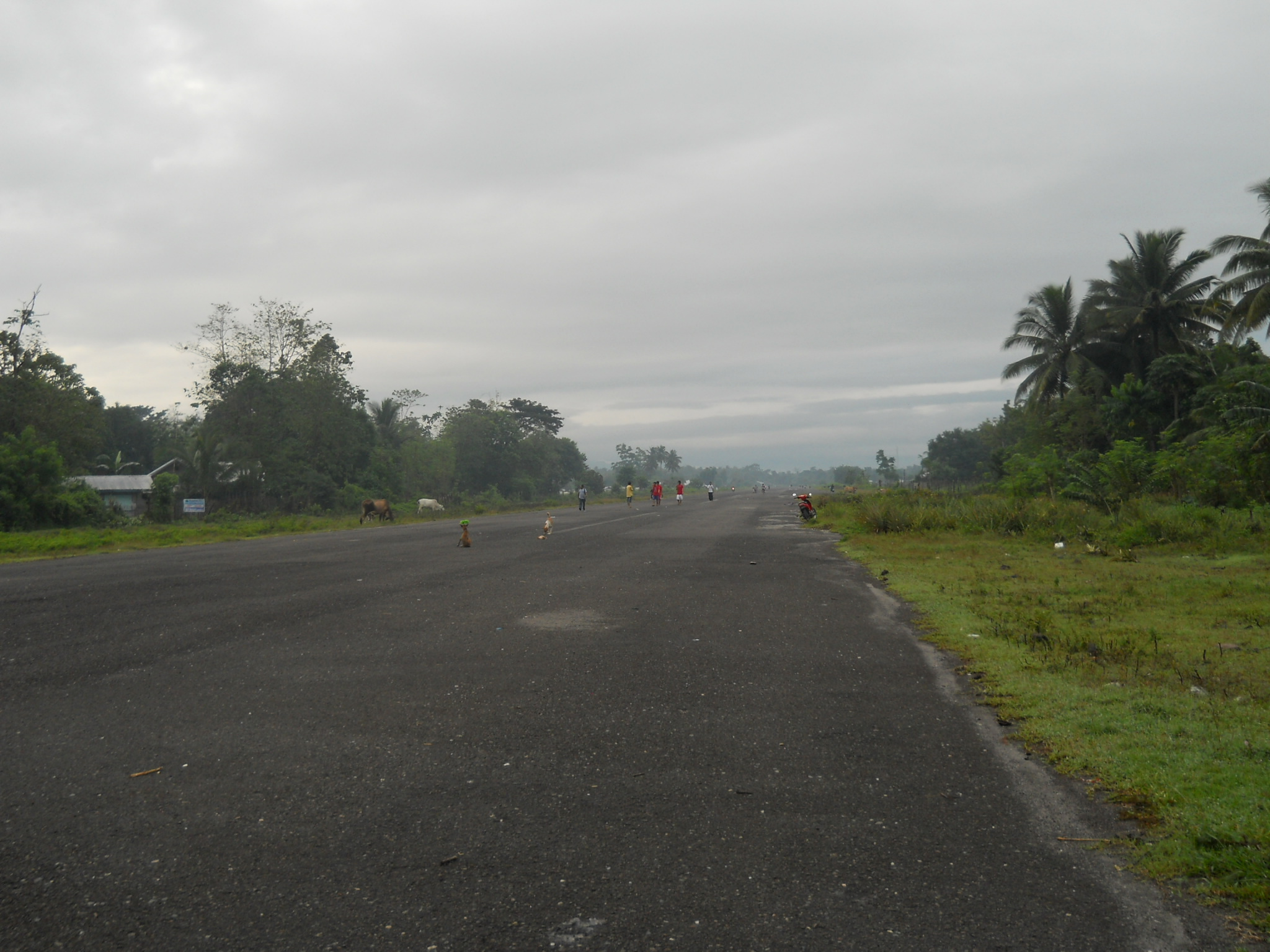
- Runway of Allah Valley Airport

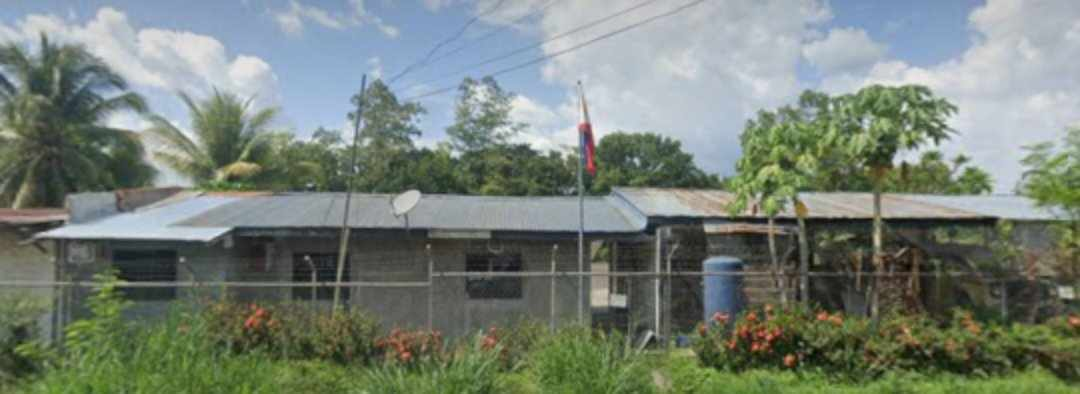
- Main building of Allah Valley Airport
- IATA: AAV; ICAO: RPMA

Summary
- Airport type: Public
- Owner/Operator: Civil Aviation Authority of the Philippines
- Serves: Allah Valley
- Location: Surallah, South Cotabato
- Elevation AMSL: 201 m / 659 ft
- Coordinates: 06°22′00″N 124°45′03″E

Map
- Location in the Philippines

Runways
Direction	Length		Surface
Direction	m	ft	Surface
16/34	1,340	4,396	Asphalt

Allah Valley Airport (IATA: AAV, ICAO: RPMA) is an airport serving the general area of Allah Valley, located in the province of South Cotabato in the Philippines. There are currently no scheduled flights serving this airport.

The airport used to have commercial flights from the 1970s to the 1980s with routes served by Philippine Airlines.

Although the airport is officially named "Allah Valley Airport" by the Civil Aviation Authority of the Philippines, some sources use the name "Alah Airport", although this is unofficial.

The airport is classified by the Civil Aviation Authority of the Philippines as a community airport.

== See also ==
- List of airports in the Philippines
