= Bagasbas Airport =

Bagasbas Airport Paliparan ng Bagasbas Palayogan nin Bagasbas
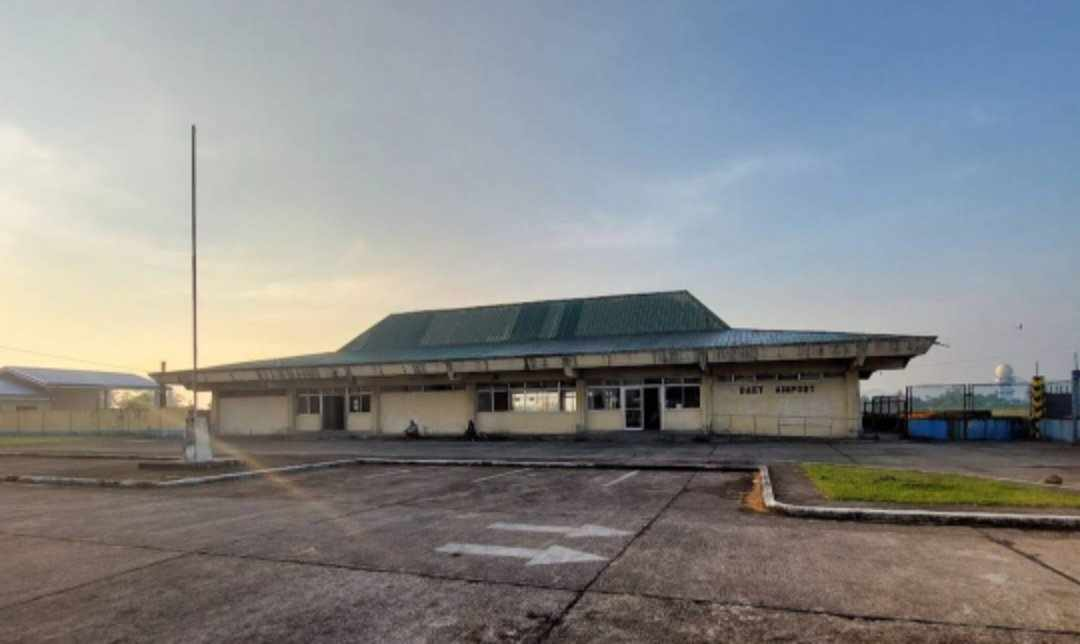
- Bagasbas Airport
- IATA: DTE; ICAO: RPUD

Summary
- Airport type: Public
- Operator: Air Transportation Office
- Serves: Daet, Camarines Norte
- Location: Barangay Bagasbas, Daet, Camarines Norte
- Elevation AMSL: 4 m / 13 ft
- Coordinates: 14°7′46″N 122°58′50″E

Map
- Location in Camarines Norte Location in Luzon Location in the Philippines

Runways
Direction	Length		Surface
Direction	m	ft	Surface
06/24	1,150	3,773	Asphalt

Bagasbas Airport (Filipino: Paliparan ng Bagasbas, Bikol: Palayogan nin Bagasbas) (IATA: DTE, ICAO: RPUD), also known as Daet Airport, is an airport serving the general area of the town of Daet, located in the province of Camarines Norte in the Philippines. It is the only airport in Camarines Norte. The airport is classified as a secondary airport, or a minor commercial domestic airport, by the Air Transportation Office, a body of the Department of Transportation that is responsible for the operations of all airports in the Philippines except the major international airports.

The airport, in service since the 1930s, derives its name from its location in Barangay Bagasbas in Daet.

The airport is currently being renovated and is set to be open once again for public usage once the renovation has been finished.

== See also ==
- List of airports in the Philippines
- Barangay Bagasbas
