= Jomalig Airport =

Airport in the Philippines

Jomalig Airport Paliparan ng Jomalig
- IATA: none; ICAO: RPLJ

Summary
- Airport type: Public
- Operator: Civil Aviation Authority of the Philippines
- Serves: Jomalig
- Location: Jomalig, Quezon
- Elevation AMSL: 11 m / 36 ft
- Coordinates: 14°42′14.97″N 122°19′52.07″E
- Interactive map of Jomalig Airport

Runways
Direction	Length		Surface
Direction	m	ft	Surface
05/23	570	1,870	Grass

Jomalig Airport (Filipino: Paliparan ng Jomalig; ICAO: RPLJ) is an airport serving the island municipality of Jomalig in the province of Quezon, Philippines. The airport is classified as a feeder or community airport by the Civil Aviation Authority of the Philippines, a body of the Department of Transportation that is responsible for the operations of not only this airport but also of all other airports in the Philippines except the major international airports.
