= Malabang Airport =

Airport in Malabang, Lanao del Sur, Philippines

Malabang Airport Landing a Malabang Paliparan ng Malabang مطار ملابانج
- IATA: MLP; ICAO: RPMM

Summary
- Airport type: Public
- Operator: Civil Aviation Authority of the Philippines (airside and landside); Bangsamoro Airport Authority (landside)
- Serves: Lanao del Sur; Lanao del Norte; Northwest of Maguindanao del Norte; Marawi City; Iligan City
- Location: Malabang, Lanao del Sur
- Elevation AMSL: 10.60 ft / 3.23 m
- Coordinates: 07°37′02″N 124°03′27″E

Map
- Location in the Philippines

Runways
Direction	Length		Surface
Direction	ft	m	Surface
06/24	4,462	1,360	Concrete
- Statistics from the Development Plan for the Bangsamoro Final Report, August 2016

Malabang Airport (IATA: MLP, ICAO: RPMM) is an airport located in the town of Malabang, Lanao del Sur, Philippines. The Civil Aviation Authority of the Philippines classifies this 16.05-hectare facility as a community airport.

With no airlines serving the airport, the runway is frequently used for drying corn and coconut (copra).
