= Bulan Airport =

Airport in the Philippines

Bulan Airport Paliparan ng Bulan
- IATA: BSOA; ICAO: RPUU

Summary
- Airport type: Public
- Operator: Civil Aviation Authority of the Philippines
- Serves: Bulan
- Location: Bulan, Sorsogon
- Elevation AMSL: 8 m / 26 ft
- Coordinates: 12°41′03.12″N 123°52′40.49″E
- Interactive map of Bulan Airport

Runways
Direction	Length		Surface
Direction	m	ft	Surface
18/36	884	2,900	Concrete / Grass

Bulan Airport (Filipino: Paliparan ng Bulan; ICAO: RPUU) is an airport serving the municipality of Bulan in the province of Sorsogon, Philippines. The airport is classified as a feeder or community airport by the Civil Aviation Authority of the Philippines, a body of the Department of Transportation that is responsible for the operations of not only this airport but also of all other airports in the Philippines except the major international airports.
