= Ipil Airport =

Airport in Ipil, Zamboanga Sibugay, Philippines

Ipil Airport Tugpahanan sa Ipil Aeropuerto de Ipil Paliparan ng Ipil
- IATA: IPE; ICAO: RPMV

Summary
- Airport type: Public
- Operator: Civil Aviation Authority of the Philippines
- Serves: Ipil, Zamboanga Sibugay
- Location: Barangay Sanito, Ipil, Zamboanga Sibugay
- Elevation AMSL: 16 m / 52 ft
- Coordinates: 07°47′10.10″N 122°36′4.10″E
- Interactive map of Ipil Airport

Runways
Direction	Length		Surface
Direction	m	ft	Surface
16/34	1,200	3,150	Concrete

Ipil Airport (IATA: IPE, ICAO: RPMV) is an airport serving the general area of Ipil, the capital of the province of Zamboanga Sibugay in the Philippines. It is one of the two airports in the province, the other is Malangas Airfield. It is classified as a community airport by the Civil Aviation Authority of the Philippines, a body of the Department of Transportation that is responsible for the operations of not only this airport but also of all other airports in the Philippines except the major international airports.

== Future expansion ==
A ninety-million peso expansion project was launched by the Philippine government in February 2009 to upgrade and improve the airport's facilities. The project is divided into two stages, with the result being a 1.2-kilometer runway with a taxiway, apron and terminal building, with the possibility of the runway being as long as two kilometers. Once complete, the airport will be able to support small passenger and cargo planes, while at the same time serving as a reliever airport for Zamboanga International Airport in Zamboanga City.

== See also ==
- List of airports in the Philippines
