= Iba Airport =

Iba Airport Paliparan ng Iba Pagtayaban ti Iba
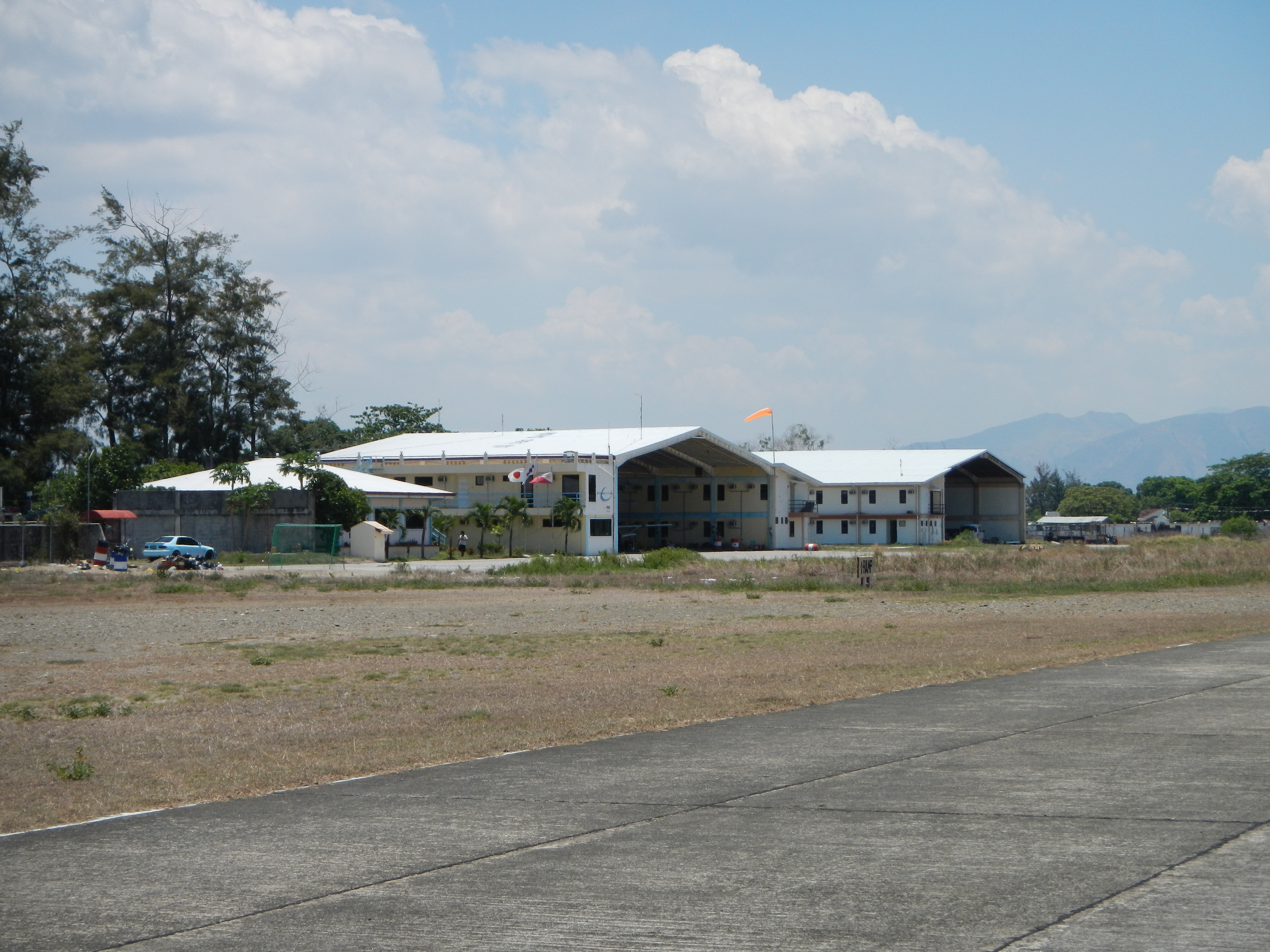
- IATA: none; ICAO: RPUI

Summary
- Airport type: Public
- Operator: Air Transportation Office
- Serves: Iba, Zambales
- Location: Barangay Santo Rosario, Iba, Zambales
- Elevation AMSL: 11 ft (3.4 m)
- Coordinates: 15°19′33.49″N 119°58′6.46″E
- Interactive map of Iba Airport

Runways
Direction	Length		Surface
Direction	m	ft	Surface
14/32	900	2,953	concrete

Iba Airport (Filipino: Paliparan ng Iba, Ilocano: Pagtayaban ti Iba) (ICAO: RPUI) is an airport serving the general area of Iba, located in the province of Zambales in the Philippines. It is one of the five airports in Zambales. It is classified as a feeder airport by the Air Transportation Office, a body of the Department of Transportation that is responsible for the operations of not only this airport but also of all other airports in the Philippines except the major international airports. Iba Airport serves as a training area for the Philippine Air Force and is also used by general aviation and flight training organizations, including private flight schools such as All Asia Aviation Academy.

== Images ==
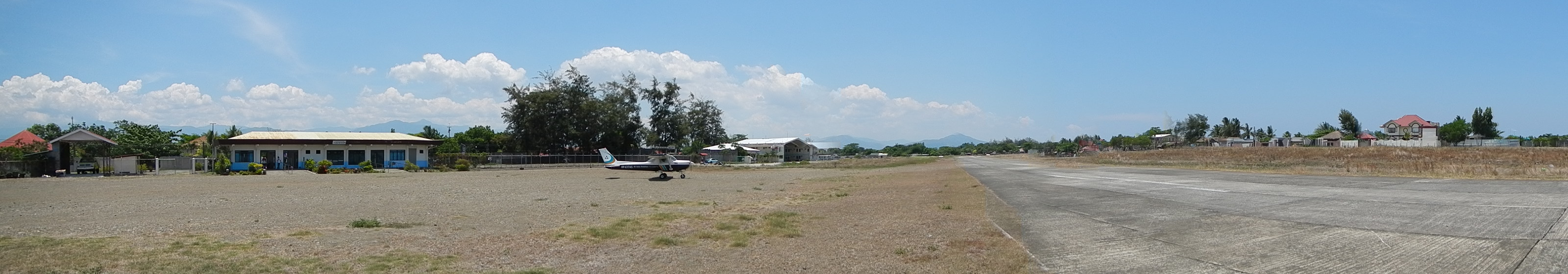
Runway of Iba Airport panorama

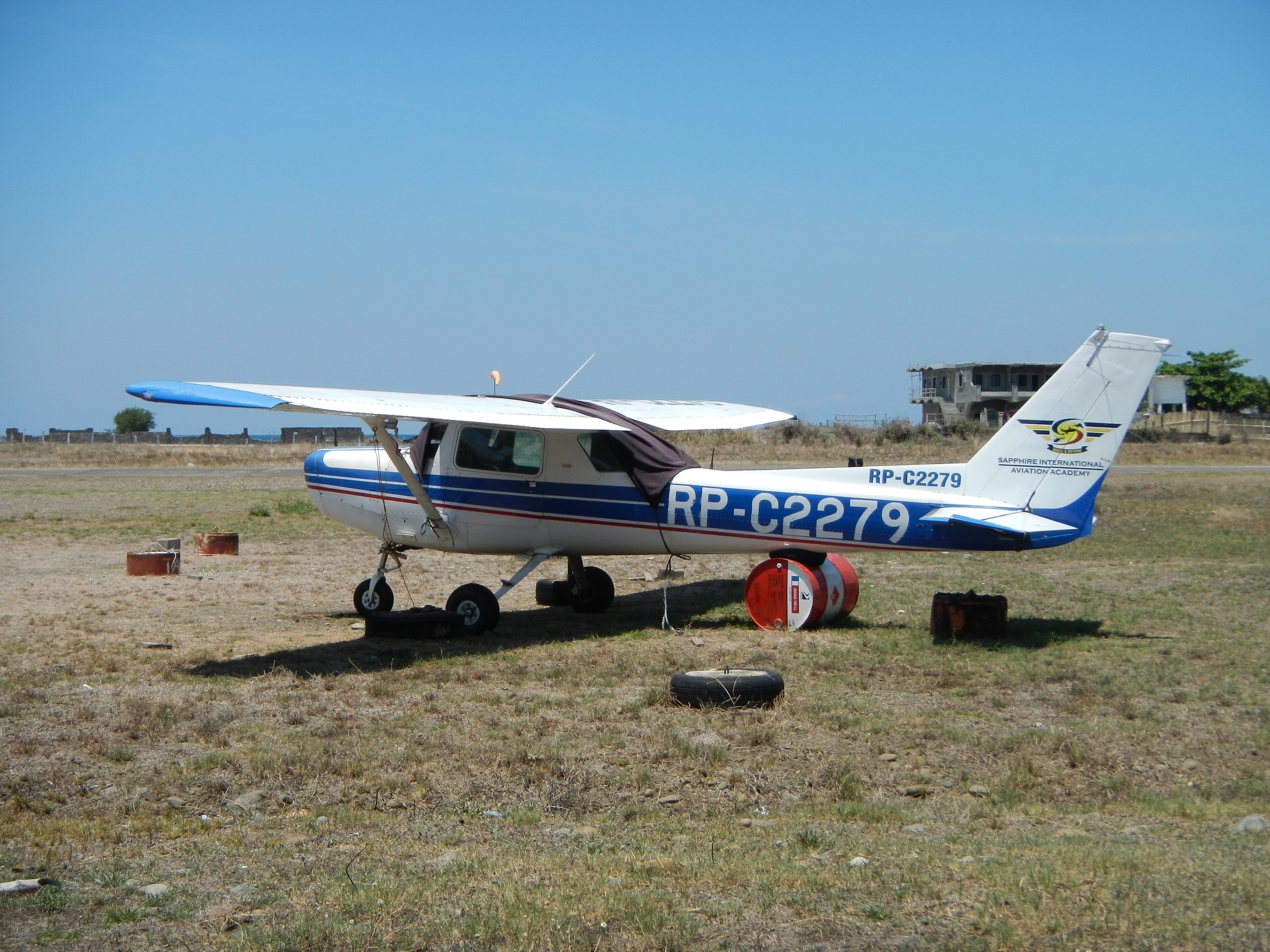
Parked private plane

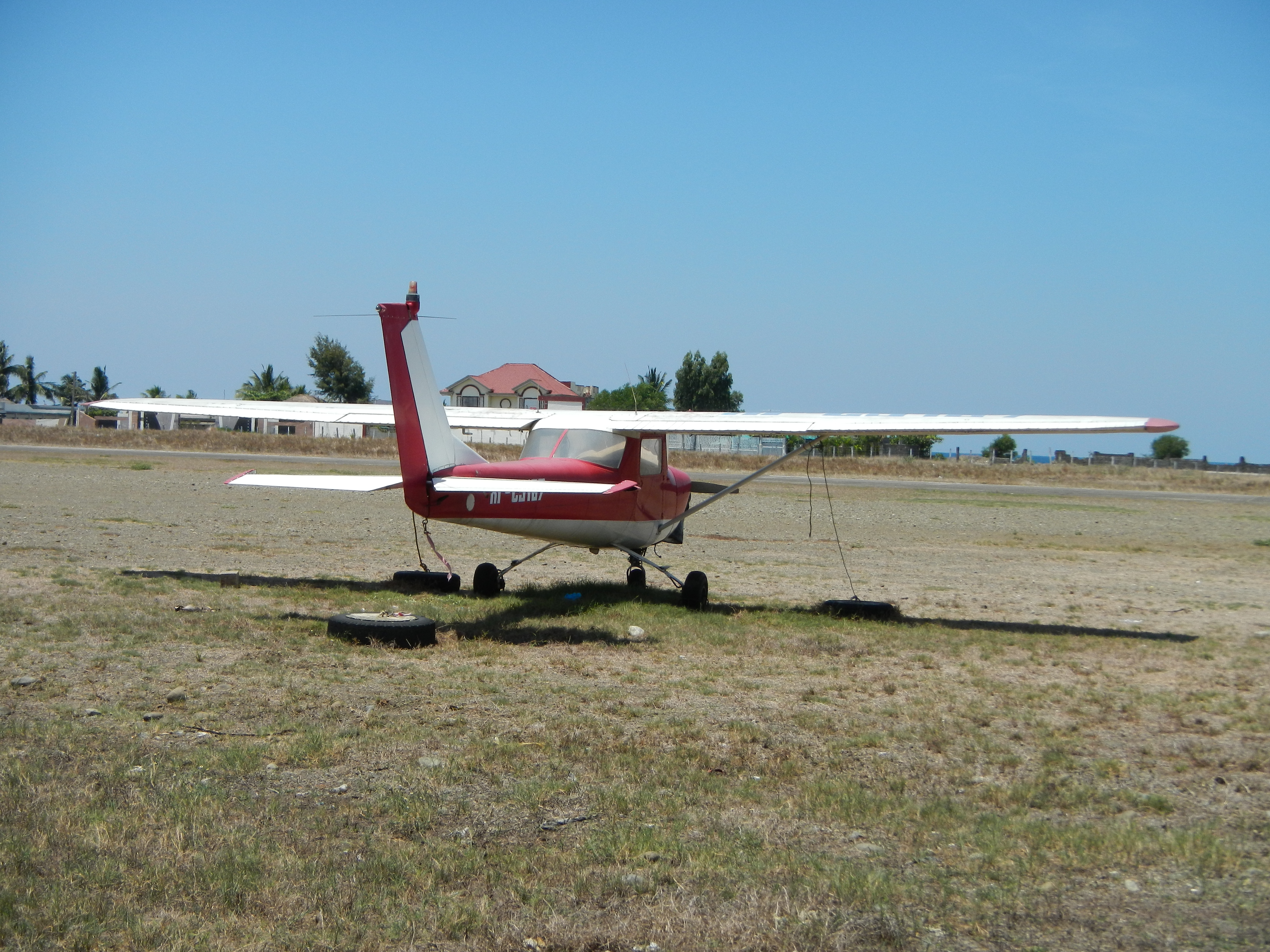
Aviation school plane

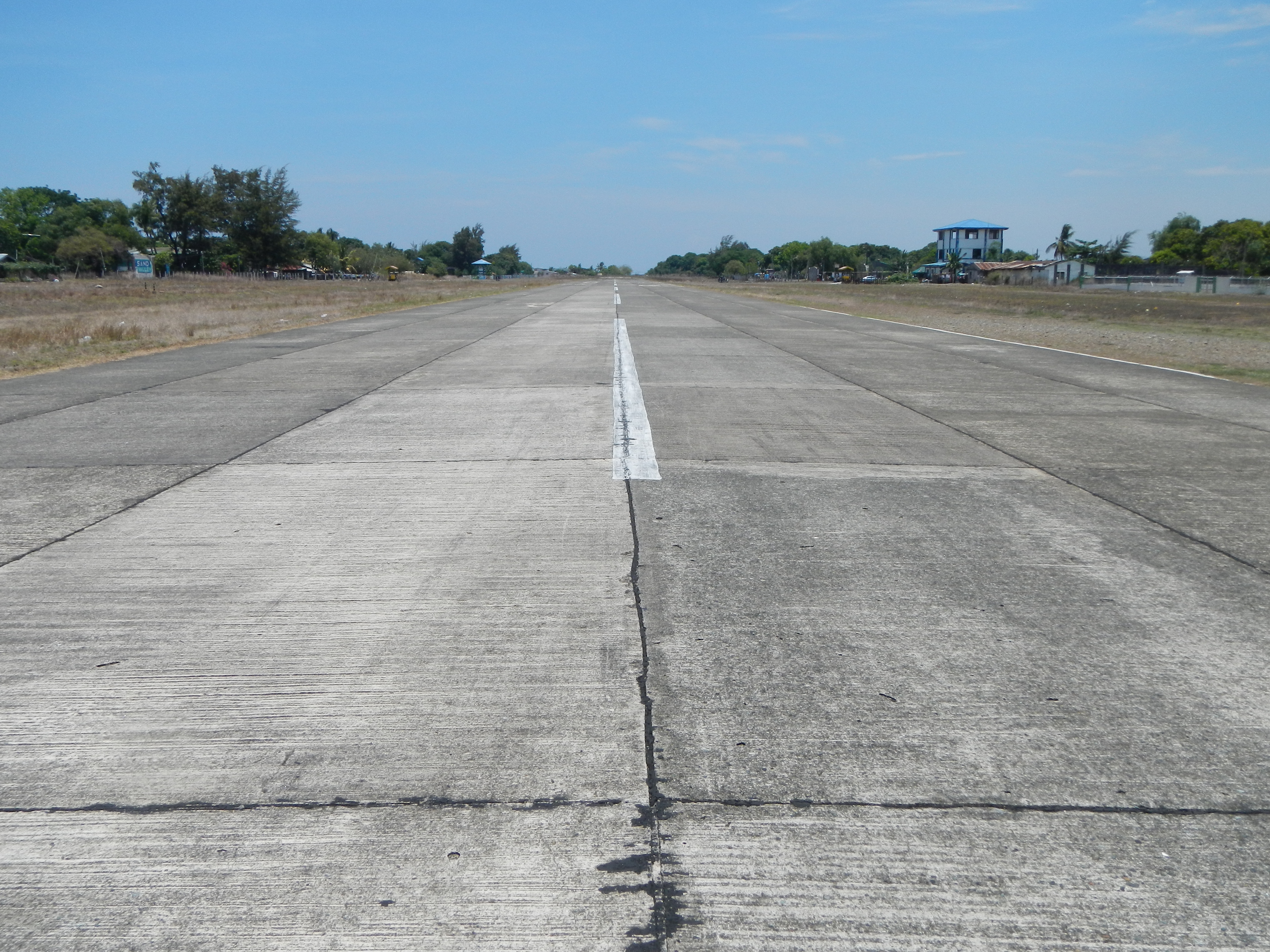
The short runway

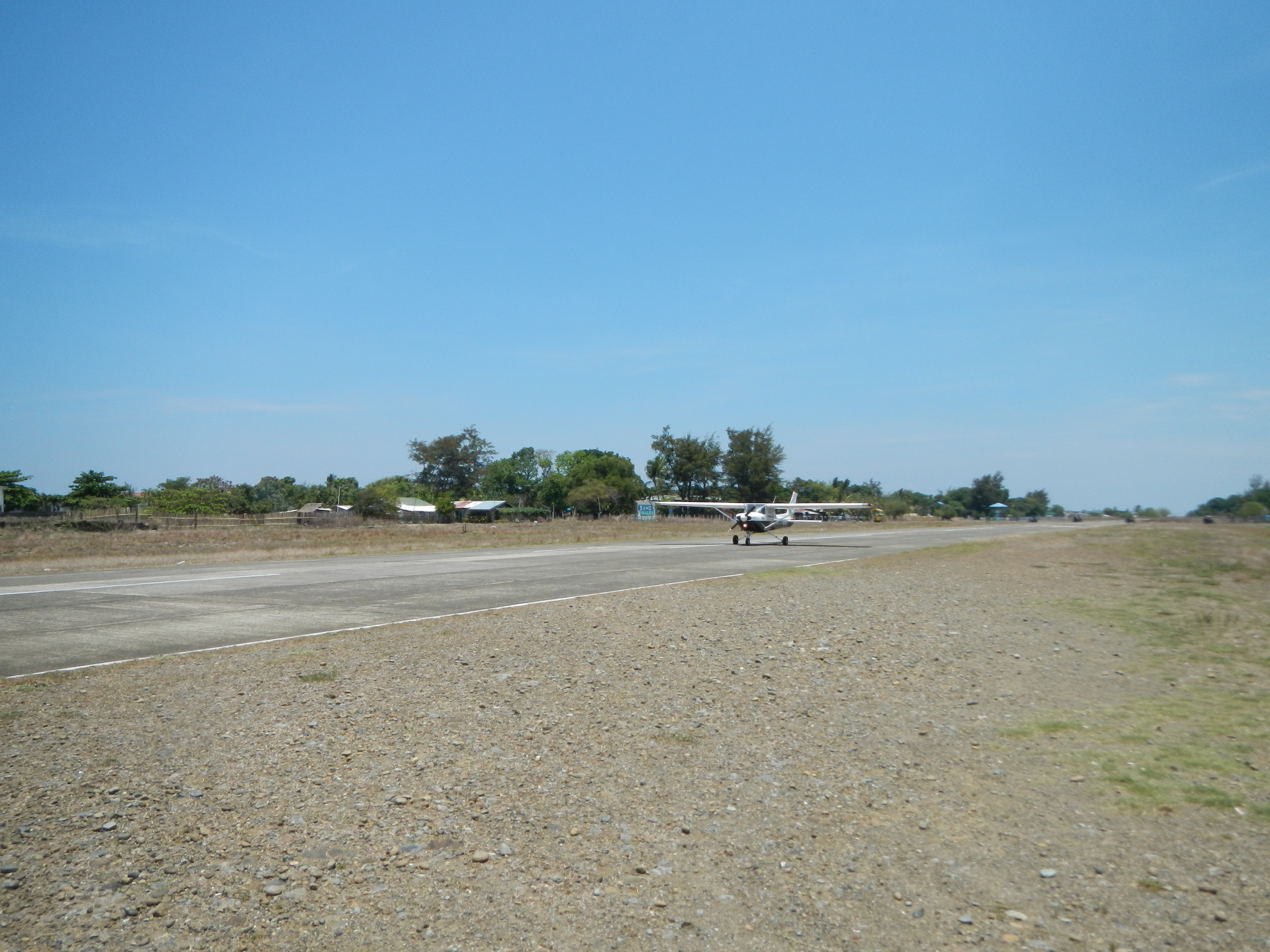
Descending plane of student pilot with instructor

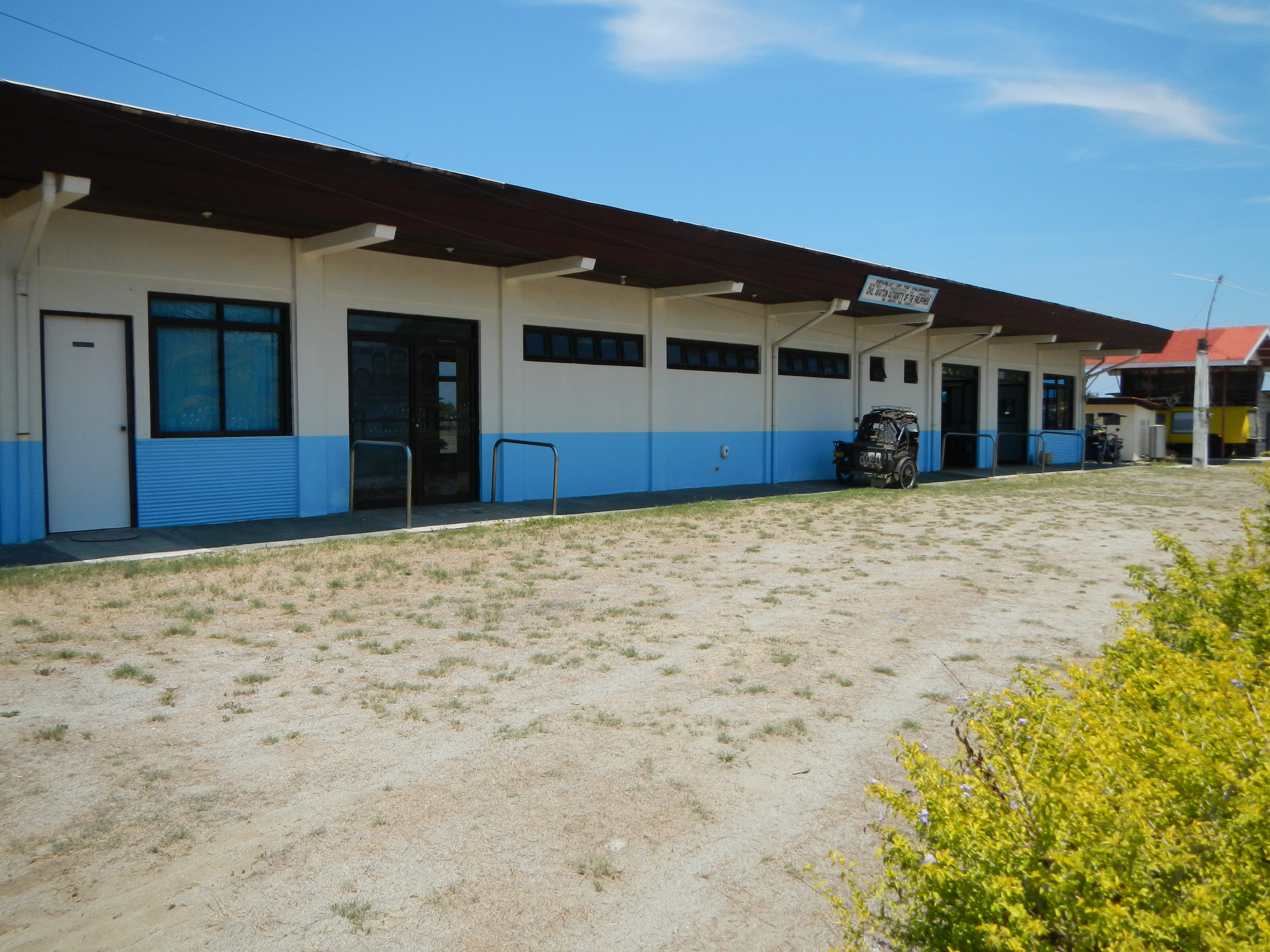
Civil Aviation Authority of the Philippines office in the center of the Airport
