= Hilongos Airport =

Coordinates: 10°22′36″N 124°45′40″E

Hilongos Airport Tugpuhanan sa Hilongos Luparan han Hilongos
- IATA: none; ICAO: RPVH

Summary
- Airport type: Public
- Operator: Civil Aviation Authority of the Philippines
- Location: Hilongos, Leyte, Philippines
- Elevation AMSL: 13 ft (4.0 m)
- Interactive map of Hilongos Airport

Runways
Direction	Length		Surface
Direction	ft	m	Surface
08/26	3,280	1,800	Gravel
Width	100	50
- Source:Great Circle Mapper

Hilongos Airport (ICAO: RPVH), located in the municipality of Hilongos, is one of three airports in the province of Leyte It is located on the southern side of Leyte Island.

There are no airlines operating at this airport.
