= Virac Airport =

Airport in Catanduanes, Philippines

Virac Airport Palayogan nin Virac Paliparan ng Virac
- The airport in April 2024
- IATA: VRC; ICAO: RPUV; WMO: 98446

Summary
- Airport type: Public
- Owner/Operator: Civil Aviation Authority of the Philippines
- Serves: Catanduanes
- Location: Virac
- Elevation AMSL: 37 m (121 ft)
- Coordinates: 13°34′35″N 124°12′20″E

Map
- Location within Catanduanes Location within Luzon Location within Philippines

Runways
Direction	Length		Surface
Direction	m	ft	Surface
06/24	1,886	6,188	Concrete

Statistics (2017)
- Passengers: 53,265
- Aircraft movements: 662
- Cargo Movements(in kgs): 76,642
- Source: Statistics from eFOI

Virac Airport (IATA: VRC, ICAO: RPUV) is an airport serving the island province of Catanduanes in the Philippines. It is located in the capital, Virac, and is the only airport in the province.

The airport is classified as a Class 1 principal (major domestic) airport by the Civil Aviation Authority of the Philippines, a body of the Department of Transportation that is responsible for the operations of not only this airport but also of all other airports in the Philippines except the major international airports.

On October 27, 2013, Cebu Pacific launched its first Airbus flight in Virac.

== Airlines and destinations ==
Airlines	Destinations
Cebu Pacific	Manila

== Airport Redevelopment Project ==
The project is the Rehabilitation of Virac Airport with the goal expanding its passenger terminal area in order to cater to the growing number of passengers and cargo that fly in and out of Catanduanes. The project derives its funds from CAAP or the Civil Aviation Authority of the Philippines.

- Modernization of Airport Terminal and Facilities
- Asphalt overlay of runway (30mx1,886m) - approved budget 105.13 million pesos

== See also ==
- List of airports in the Philippines
