= Wao Airport =

Airport in Lanao del Sur, Philippines

Wao Airport Landing a Wao
- IATA: none; ICAO: none

Summary
- Airport type: Public
- Operator: Civil Aviation Authority of the Philippines (airside and landside); Bangsamoro Airport Authority (landside)
- Serves: Wao; Southwest Bukidnon; Northwest Cotabato; Iranun Corridor
- Location: Wao, Lanao del Sur
- Elevation AMSL: 536 m / 1,758 ft
- Coordinates: 07°38′01″N 124°44′01″E

Map
- Location in the Philippines

Runways
Direction	Length		Surface
Direction	m	ft	Surface
18/36	1,000	3,281	Macadam
- Statistics from the Development Plan for the Bangsamoro Final Report, August 2016

Wao Airport (Maranao/Iranun: Landing a Wao) is an airport serving the general area of Wao, located in the province of Lanao del Sur, Philippines. The Civil Aviation Authority of the Philippines classifies this recently constructed (ca. 2015) facility as a community airport.

As of 2016 the airport has only been used for a few private flights.
