= Bantayan Airport =

Airport in Bantayan, Cebu, Philippines

Bantayan Airport Tugpahanan sa Bantayan Paliparan ng Bantayan
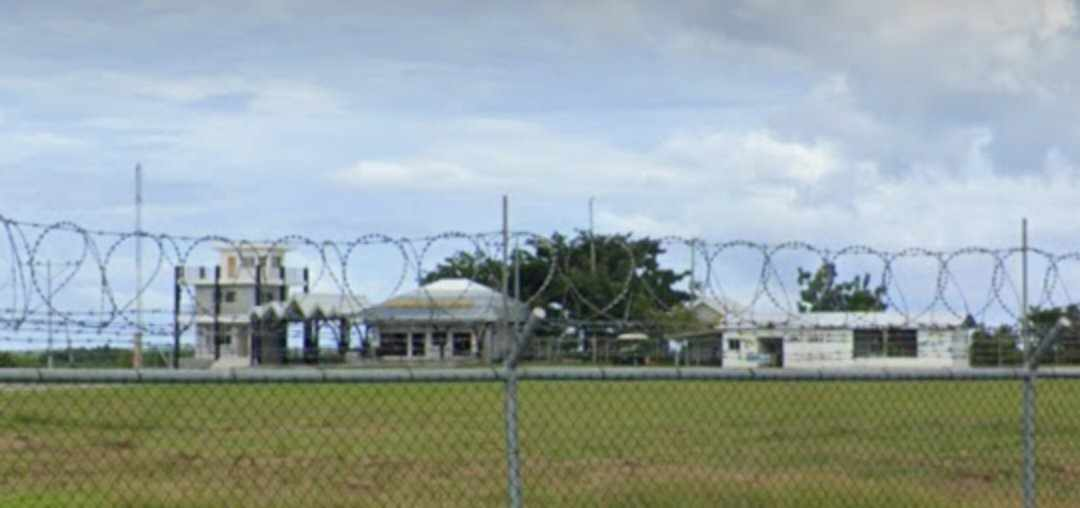
- Bantayan Airport
- IATA: none; ICAO: RPSB

Summary
- Airport type: Public
- Operator: Mactan–Cebu International Airport Authority
- Serves: Bantayan Island
- Location: Barangays Talisay and Okoy, Santa Fe, Bantayan Island, Cebu, Philippines
- Opened: November 27, 2020; 5 years ago
- Elevation AMSL: 60–70 ft (18–21 m)
- Coordinates: 11°09′45″N 123°47′05″E

Map
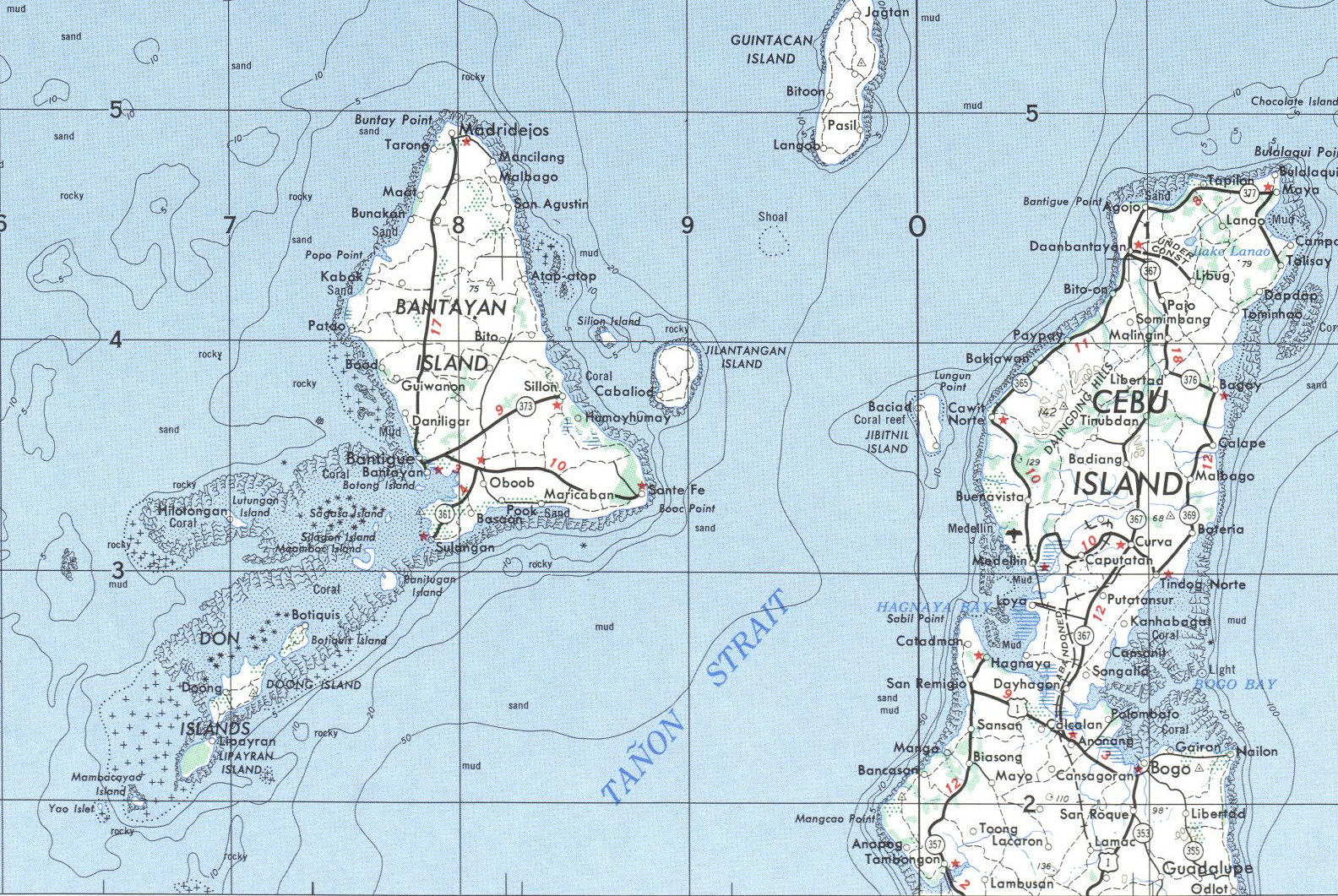
- Map showing location of Bantayan Airport

Runways
Direction	Length		Surface
Direction	m	ft	Surface
16/34	1,200	3,937	Concrete

Bantayan Airport (ICAO: RPSB) is an airport serving Bantayan Island in the province of Cebu in the Philippines. The airport is located in the municipality of Santa Fe, approximately 3.9 nautical miles (7.2 km; 4.5 mi) from the centre of Bantayan municipality. It is classified as a community airport by the Civil Aviation Authority of the Philippines (CAAP). Since the beginning of 2018, management of the airport has moved from CAAP to Mactan–Cebu International Airport Authority (MCIAA).

== History ==
CAAP wished to cease the funding of the airport in 2013. However President Aquino, who flew into Bantayan airport for his first island visit in February 2014, was interested in the development of the airport. In October 2015, a private entrepreneur tried to appropriate it. In February 2015, it was reported that initial work was underway to build new airports at Bantayan and Camotes. The initial project phase is to determine a suitable location for the new airport, implying that it may be at an entirely different location on the island. From mid-November 2017, CAAP stopped operation of Bantayan airstrip, due to the airport's dilapidated state. In January 2018, the authority to manage the airport in Bantayan Island transferred from the (CAAP) to the Mactan-Cebu International Airport Authority (MCIAA). As of August 2020, Bantayan airport terminal, runway extension was to be completed by the end of 2020. In November, the construction was at its last phase, and the airport opened to business in December 2020.

== Structure ==
Bantayan Airport is a small community airstrip with a paved runway but no services (no refuelling capabilities). The largest handling capacity is now an 80-passenger aeroplane. The concrete runway is 1,400 m (4,590 ft) long and 18 m (60 ft) wide, as well as a small terminal. The terminal shed was erected in 2003, along with two security fences and the airport gate, as part of an airport improvement program initiated by the CAAP.

== Airlines and destinations ==
Airlines	Destinations
Leading Edge Air	Cebu

== Sources ==
- Balita, LAP (4 Jul 2014). "President Aquino wants to develop Bantayan airport – Gov. Davide". Archived from the original on 6 Nov 2014.
- "Bantayan Airport Development Project". Archived from the original on 28 Nov 2012.
- Romanillos, Peter L. (19 Aug 2013). "Review Camotes, Bantayan airport projects — Davide". Cebu Daily News. Archived from the original on 18 Aug 2013.
- Mayol, Ador Vincent S.; Ta-as, Apple (23 Sep 2014). "Mayor sues Brit for fencing off airstrip". Cebu Daily News. Archived from the original on 3 Nov 2014.
- Cabahug, Melissa Q. (2 Feb 2015). "Bantayan, Camotes to have airports". Cebu Daily News. Archived from the original on 4 Feb 2015.
- Erram, Morexette Marie B. (9 Aug 2020). "Bantayan airport terminal, runway extension to be completed by end of 2020". Cebu Daily News. Archived from the original on 16 Oct 2020.
- Erram, Morexette Marie B. (9 Oct 2020b). "UPDATED: Gwen to lead Bantayan Island Airport inspection on Oct. 16". Cebu Daily News. Archived from the original on 15 Oct 2020.
- Philippines News Agency, Carlo Lorenciana (10 Aug 2020). "Bantayan Airport upgrade completed by year end: MCIAA". Archived from the original on 16 Oct 2020.
- Sugbo.ph (17 Oct 2020). "Soon to rise: Commercial airport in Bantayan Island". Archived from the original on 2 Nov 2020.
- Rubio, Gregg M. (26 Feb 2014). "Bantayan Is. eyed as tourism hub". The Freeman. Archived from the original on 7 Dec 2014.
- Braga, Michael Vencynth H. (2 Feb 2015). "Dev't of Camotes, Bantayan airports on". The Freeman. Archived from the original on 20 Jul 2015.
- Quintas, Kristine B. (14 Jan 2017). "New airport eyed". The Freeman. Archived from the original on 15 Jan 2017.
- Ambrad, Lorraine Mitzi A. (20 Nov 2017). "Capitol to fix 2 airports: CAAP stops operation of Bantayan airstrip". The Freeman. Archived from the original on 19 Nov 2017.
- Ambrad, Lorraine Mitzi A. (8 Jan 2018). "Bantayan airport now under MCIAA". The Freeman. Archived from the original on 7 Jan 2018.
