= Biliran Airport =

Airport in Naval, Biliran, Philippines

Biliran Airport Tugpahanan sa Biliran (Cebuano) Luparan han Biliran (Waray) Paliparan ng Biliran (Filipino)
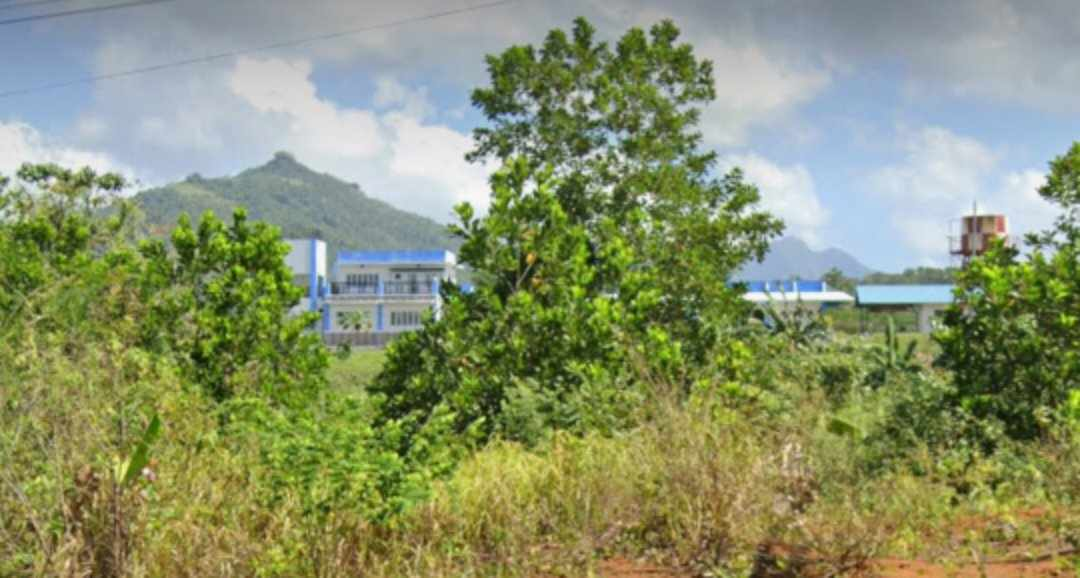
- Biliran Airport seen from the highway
- IATA: none; ICAO: RPVQ

Summary
- Airport type: Public
- Owner/Operator: Civil Aviation Authority of the Philippines
- Serves: Biliran
- Location: Naval, Biliran
- Coordinates: 11°30′57″N 124°25′44″E

Map
- Location in the Philippines

Runways
Direction	Length		Surface
Direction	ft	m	Surface
18/36	3,281	1,000	Dirt

Biliran Airport (Cebuano: Tugpahanan sa Biliran, Waray: Luparan han Biliran, Filipino: Paliparan ng Biliran) (ICAO: RPVQ) is an airport serving the general area of the island of Biliran, located in the province of Biliran in the Philippines. There was only one airline flying this route from Cebu to Naval 5x weekly; Air Juan, until they went bankrupt in 2020.

The Biliran airport was constructed in the 1970s as an adjunct of the Busali Ranch, believed to have been acquired by the administration of then President Ferdinand Marcos.
