= AirAsia Zest =

Low-cost airline of the Philippines (1995–2015)

IATA	ICAO	Call sign
6K (1995–2008); Z2 (2008–2015)	RIT (1995–2008); EZD (2008–2015)	ASIAN SPIRIT (1995–2008); ZEST (2008–2015)
- Founded: September 1995 (as Asian Spirit); 1 October 2008 (as Zest Air)
- Commenced operations: 29 March 1996 (as Asian Spirit); 30 September 2008 (as Zest Air); 21 October 2013 (as AirAsia Zest)
- Ceased operations: 30 September 2008 (as Asian Spirit); 21 October 2013 (as Zest Air); 6 December 2015 (merged into Philippines AirAsia)
- AOC #: 2009003
- Operating bases: Cebu; Kalibo; Manila
- Fleet size: 15
- Destinations: 13
- Parent company: AMY Holdings (2008–2015); Philippines AirAsia (2013–2015)
- Headquarters: Pasay, Metro Manila, Philippines
- Key people: Marianne Hontiveros (Chairman); Joy Cañeba (CEO)
- Website: www.airasia.com

Zest Airways, Inc., operated as AirAsia Zest (formerly Asian Spirit and Zest Air), was a Filipino low-cost airline based at Ninoy Aquino International Airport in Pasay, Metro Manila in the Philippines. It operated scheduled domestic and international tourist services, mainly feeder services linking Manila and Cebu with 24 domestic destinations in support of the trunk route operations of other airlines.

The airline was founded as Asian Spirit, the first airline in the Philippines to be run as a cooperative. After its acquisition by AMY Holdings of businessman Alfredo Yao in 2008, the airline was rebranded as Zest Airways. In 2013, the airline was rebranded as AirAsia Zest and became an affiliate of Philippines AirAsia operating their brand separately.

The airline was merged with AirAsia Philippines to form Philippines AirAsia in 2015.

== History ==
=== Beginnings as Asian Spirit ===
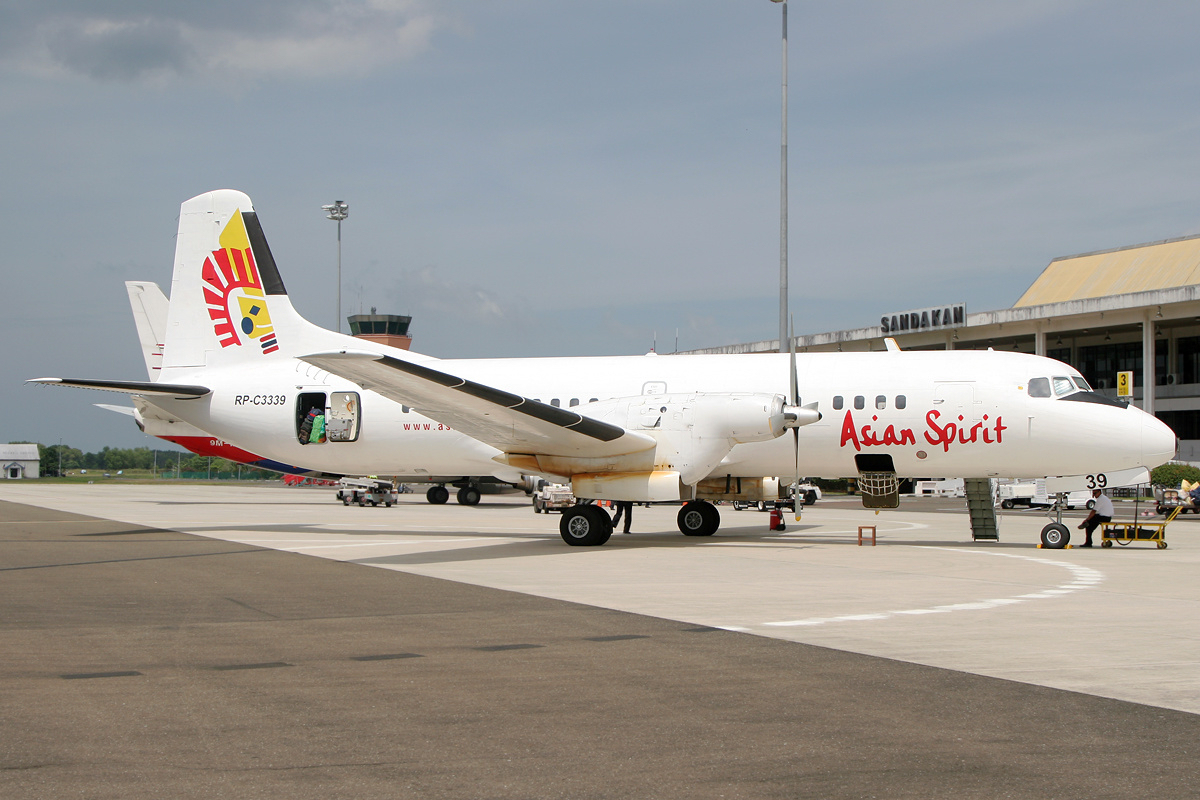
Asian Spirit NAMC YS-11 airliner at Sandakan Airport, Malaysia (August 2007)

Logo of Asian Spirit

Asian Spirit was established in September 1995 by Antonio "Toti" Turalba, Emmanuel "Noel" Oñate and Archibald Po, who contributed US$1 million each to start up the Airline Employees Cooperative (AEC). They arranged for 36 of their friends, mostly former Philippine Airlines employees, to run Asian Spirit through a salary-to-equity swap deal. The Po family held the majority of ownership.

It started operations in April 1996 with two second-hand Dash 7 aircraft servicing only one scheduled commercial route with two flights per day from Manila to Malay, serving the fledgling resort island of Boracay. To maximise its aircraft utilisation, it introduced new routes to the present-day towns of San Jose, Virac, Daet and Alcantara, and the cities of Cauayan and Masbate, regarded as secondary and tertiary routes by Air Transportation Office, and not serviced by major airlines. In 1997, the cooperative changed to a corporate set-up with the establishment of Asian Spirit, Inc., whose registration was approved by the Securities and Exchange Commission in 2005.

At the time, Asian Spirit has the distinction of being the first scheduled airline to serve Caticlan Airport, the nearest airport serving Boracay. Other operators served the airport on a charter basis then. It became the Philippines' fourth flag carrier (after Philippine Airlines, Cebu Pacific and Air Philippines) in 2003.

The airline planned to fly to three international destinations to Sandakan, Malaysia from Zamboanga, to Seoul from Kalibo, Laoag, and Davao, and Macau from Angeles City. However these international routings never took off. It also intended to commence international expansion to Bangkok in 2007.

=== Rebranding as Zest Airways ===
Logo of Zest Air

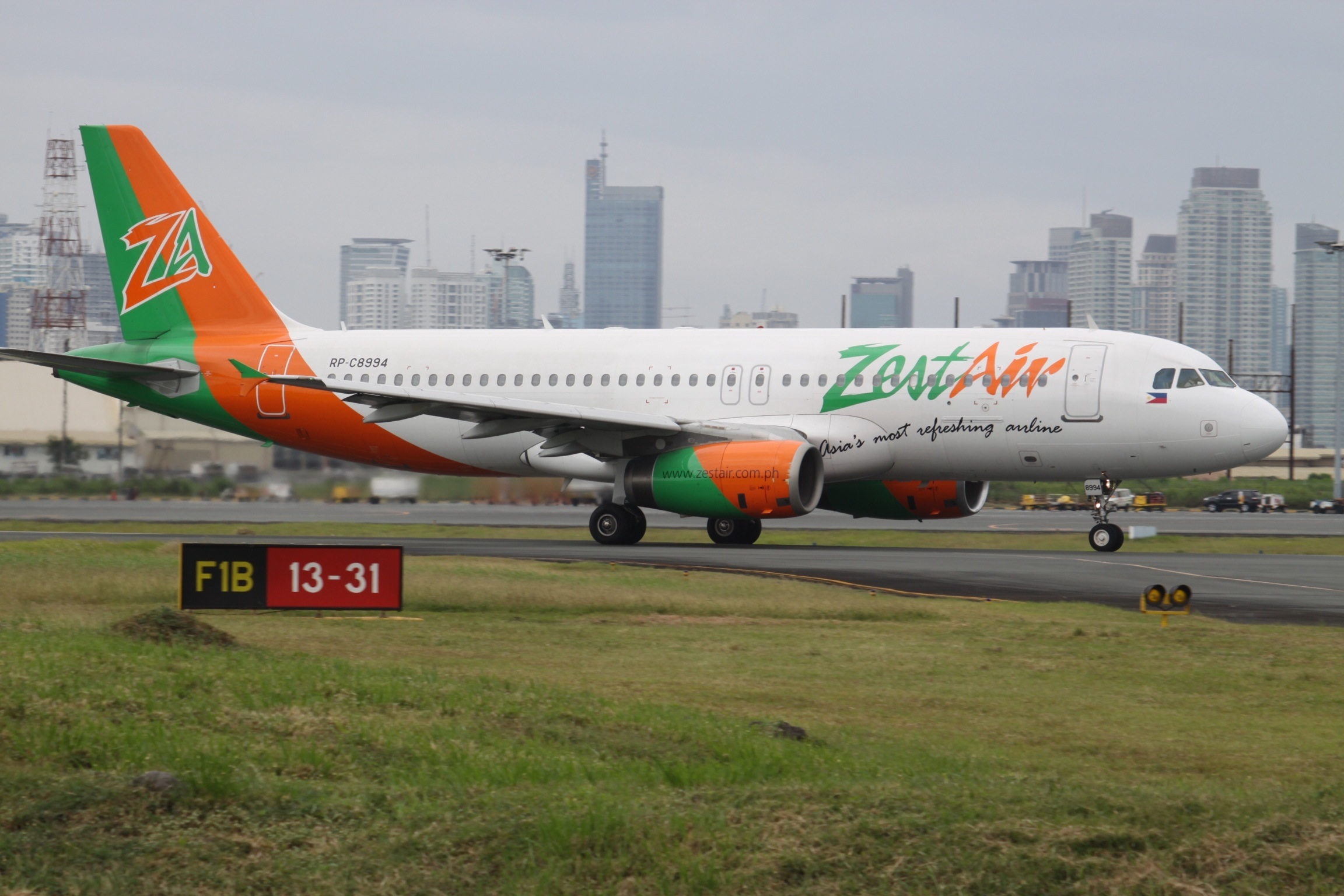
A Zest Air Airbus A320 in 2012

In January 2008, Asian Spirit was sold to AMY Holdings, a holding company controlled by businessman Alfredo Yao. The acquisition was completed on 29 March of that year. After the success of the takeover, Yao expressed interest in merging Asian Spirit with South East Asian Airlines (SEAIR). Yao had been expected to purchase a sixty percent stake in SEAIR, but the merger talks failed and both airlines continued to operate independently.

The Zest Air Airbus A320-232 was first introduced in September 1, 2008.

On 31 August 2008, Asian Spirit announced that it would be re-branding itself as Zest Airways to reflect the stake of the owner, Zest-O Corporation, in the airline. In 2009, Zest Airways intended to establish a hub at Diosdado Macapagal International Airport.

=== Partnership with AirAsia and merger ===
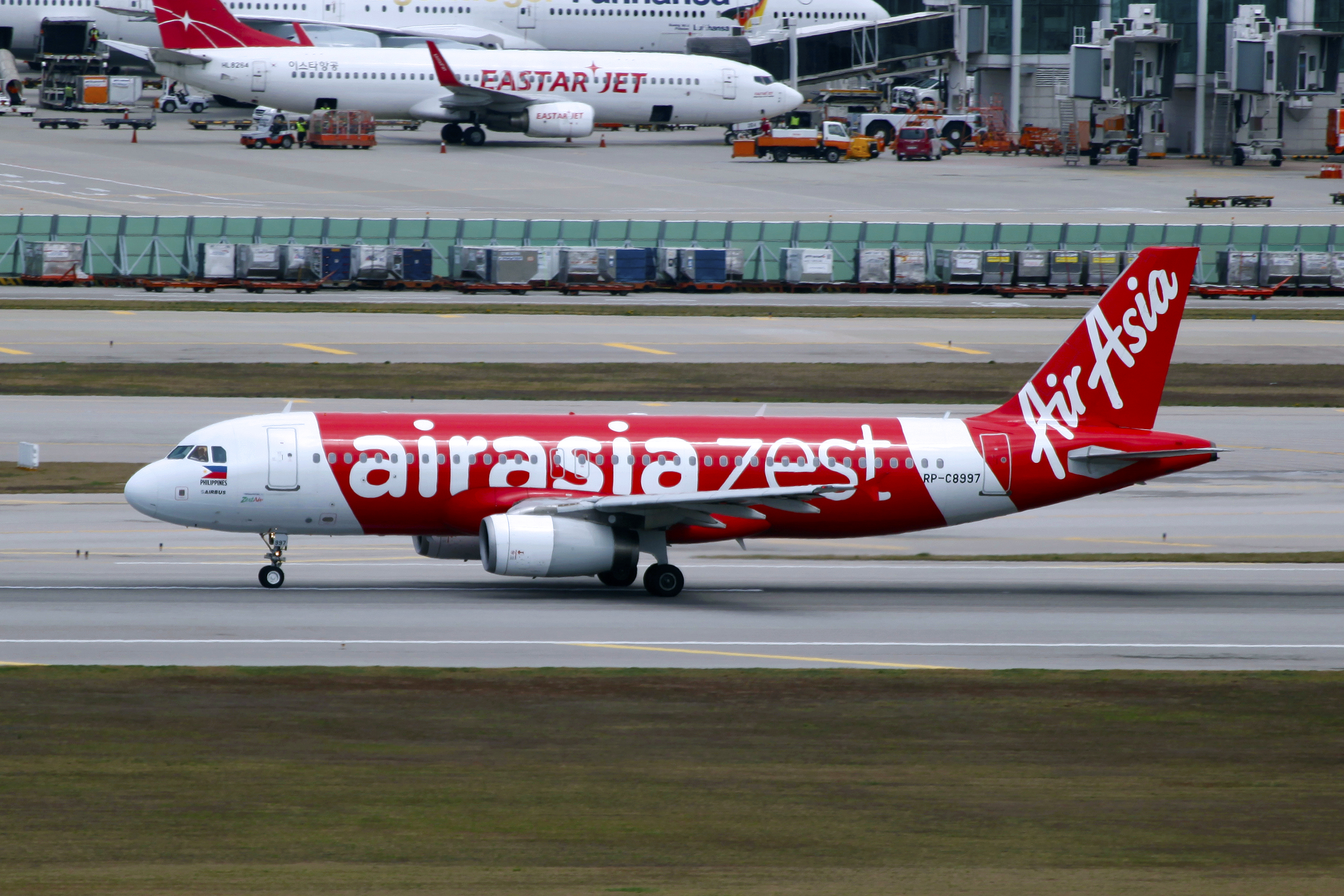
AirAsia Zest livery

On 11 March 2013, Zest Airways signed a share swap agreement with AirAsia Philippines. The share swap deal involved exchange of shares between the owner of Zest Airways, Filipino shareholders of AirAsia Philippines, Inc. and AirAsia Berhad of Malaysia. On the same day, the airlines announced a strategic alliance that would integrate the operations of both airlines while still operating as separate entities. The deal closed on 10 May 2013.

On 16 August 2013, the Civil Aviation Authority of the Philippines (CAAP) suspended the airline's air operating certificate due to safety issues. The suspension was lifted on 20 August.

Less than a year after the strategic alliance with AirAsia Philippines, on 21 September, the airline was rebranded as "AirAsia Zest". During its initial phases, ZestAir's website carried an image of an aircraft featuring AirAsia's signature red livery and the Zest title on the body and AirAsia's signature red livery on the tail. The rebranded airline has a new theme "AirAsia Zest, the right way to fly."

AirAsia Zest eventually merged with AirAsia Philippines in 2015 to form Philippines AirAsia. This merger effectively phased out the AirAsia Zest brand. Both airlines completed the transition to a single operating certificate in September of that year. AirAsia Zest then ceased operations on 6 December 2015.

== Destinations ==
Zest Airways served the following destinations prior to August 2013, when its operating license was revoked:

Country	City	Airport	Notes	Refs
China	Chengdu	Chengdu Shuangliu International Airport	Terminated	
China	Quanzhou	Quanzhou Jinjiang International Airport		
China	Shanghai	Shanghai Pudong International Airport		
Hong Kong	Hong Kong	Hong Kong International Airport	Terminated	
Macau	Macau	Macau International Airport	Terminated	
Malaysia	Sandakan	Sandakan Airport	Terminated	
Palau	Koror	Roman Tmetuchl International Airport	Terminated	
Philippines (Luzon)	Baguio	Loakan Airport	Terminated	
Philippines (Luzon)	Basco	Basco Airport	Terminated	
Philippines (Luzon)	Busuanga	Francisco B. Reyes Airport	Terminated	
Philippines (Luzon)	Cauayan	Cauayan Airport	Terminated	
Philippines (Luzon)	Clark	Diosdado Macapagal International Airport	Terminated	
Philippines (Luzon)	Daet	Bagasbas Airport	Terminated	
Philippines (Luzon)	Laoag	Laoag International Airport	Terminated	
Philippines (Luzon)	Legazpi	Legazpi Airport	Terminated	
Philippines (Luzon)	Manila	Ninoy Aquino International Airport	Base	
Philippines (Luzon)	Marinduque	Marinduque Airport	Terminated	
Philippines (Luzon)	Masbate	Moises R. Espinosa Airport	Terminated	
Philippines (Luzon)	Naga	Naga Airport	Terminated	
Philippines (Luzon)	Puerto Princesa	Puerto Princesa International Airport		
Philippines (Luzon)	San Jose (Mindoro)	San Jose Airport	Terminated	
Philippines (Luzon)	Tablas	Tugdan Airport	Terminated	
Philippines (Luzon)	Taytay	Cesar Lim Rodriguez Airport	Terminated	
Philippines (Luzon)	Tuguegarao	Tuguegarao Airport	Terminated	
Philippines (Luzon)	Virac	Virac Airport	Terminated	
Philippines (Mindanao)	Cagayan de Oro	Laguindingan Airport		
Philippines (Mindanao)	Davao	Francisco Bangoy International Airport		
Philippines (Mindanao)	Dipolog	Dipolog Airport	Terminated	
Philippines (Mindanao)	Jolo	Jolo Airport	Terminated	
Philippines (Mindanao)	Pagadian	Pagadian Airport	Terminated	
Philippines (Mindanao)	Surigao	Surigao Airport	Terminated	
Philippines (Mindanao)	Tandag	Tandag Airport	Terminated	
Philippines (Mindanao)	Tawi-Tawi	Sanga-Sanga Airport	Terminated	
Philippines (Mindanao)	Zamboanga	Zamboanga International Airport	Terminated	
Philippines (Visayas)	Bacolod	Bacolod–Silay Airport		
Philippines (Visayas)	Calbayog	Calbayog Airport	Terminated	
Philippines (Visayas)	Catarman	Catarman National Airport	Terminated	
Philippines (Visayas)	Caticlan/Boracay	Godofredo P. Ramos Airport	Terminated	
Philippines (Visayas)	Cebu	Mactan–Cebu International Airport	Base	
Philippines (Visayas)	Iloilo	Iloilo International Airport		
Philippines (Visayas)	Kalibo	Kalibo International Airport		
Philippines (Visayas)	San Jose (Antique)	Evelio B. Javier Airport	Terminated	
Philippines (Visayas)	Tacloban	Daniel Z. Romualdez Airport		
Philippines (Visayas)	Tagbilaran	Tagbilaran Airport		
Singapore	Singapore	Changi Airport	Terminated	
South Korea	Busan	Gimhae International Airport	Terminated	
South Korea	Cheongju	Cheongju International Airport	Terminated	
South Korea	Daegu	Daegu International Airport	Terminated	
South Korea	Muan	Muan International Airport	Terminated	
South Korea	Seoul	Incheon International Airport		
Taiwan	Taipei	Taoyuan International Airport	Terminated	

== Fleet ==
AirAsia Zest and its predecessors operated the following aircraft during its existence:

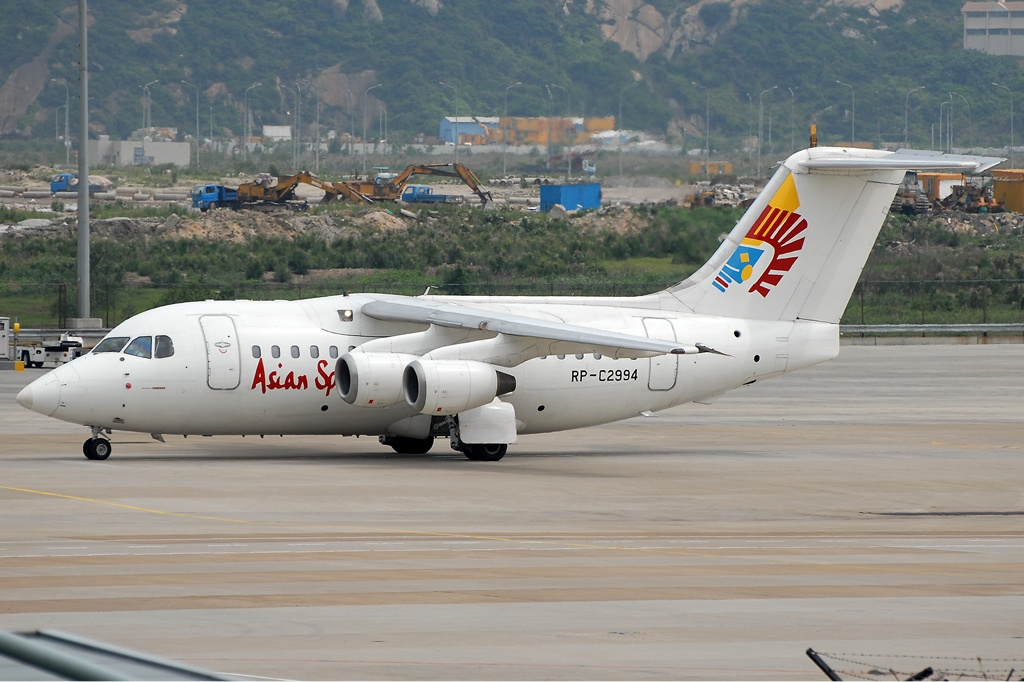
Asian Spirit British Aerospace 146 in 2008

AirAsia Zest retired fleet
Aircraft	Year retired
Airbus A320-200	2015
British Aerospace ATP	2008
British Aerospace 146-100	2008
British Aerospace 146-200	2008
CASA/IPTN CN-235	2008
de Havilland Canada Dash 7	2009
Let-410	2008
McDonnell Douglas MD-82	2008
McDonnell Douglas MD-83	2008
NAMC YS-11	2008
Xian MA60	2013

== Accidents and incidents ==
=== As Asian Spirit ===
- 7 December 1999: Asian Spirit Flight 100, a Let L-410, crashed between Kasibu in Nueva Vizcaya and Cabarroguis in Quirino, killing all 15 passengers on board and 2 crew. The plane was headed for Cauayan Airport in Cauayan. The accident forced the closure of the Manila-Cauayan route, which remained closed until Philippine Airlines restarted the route on 15 August 2008.
- 4 September 2002: Asian Spirit Flight 897 was the last flight of the day to Malay, departing Manila at 3:36pm for a one-hour flight. During the approach to Malay, the right main gear failed to deploy. The approach was abandoned and the crew decided to return to Manila for an emergency landing. The plane circled for about 35 minutes over Las Piñas to burn off fuel. The crew then carried out an emergency landing with the right gear retracted on Manila's international airport runway 24. After touchdown the aircraft swerved off the runway onto a grassy area.
- 14 November 2005: Asian Spirit Flight 587, a BAe-146-200, reportedly hydroplaned and overran runway 04/22, a 4,429-foot (1350 m) long concrete runway at Catarman National Airport. The aircraft came to rest in a muddy rice field.
- 2 January 2008, Asian Spirit Flight 321, an NAMC YS-11 departing from Manila, overshot the runway at Masbate Airport at 7:30am, due to heavy tailwinds with gusts reaching 14 knots while landing on runway 21. Although none of the 47 passengers were seriously injured, the aircraft was badly damaged.

=== As Zest Airways ===
- 11 January 2009: a Xian MA60 operated crashed at Caticlan Airport while trying to land. The aircraft landed too short on the runway, skidded out of control and crashed into a concrete barrier. The aircraft caught fire and suffered extensive damage to its wing, landing gear, undercarriage and one engine. Several passengers were injured in that accident.
- 25 June 2009: a Xian MA60 operated by Zest overshot the runway while trying to land at Caticlan Airport. As a consequence of this accident, the runway was lengthened and a hill that obstructs one of its approaches was flattened.

=== As AirAsia Zest ===
- 30 December 2014: AirAsia Zest Flight 272, an Airbus A320-200 registered RP-C8972, overshot the runway during landing at Kalibo International Airport. All 159 passengers and crew survived uninjured.
