= Palanan Airport =

Palanan Airport Paliparan ng Palanan
- IATA: none; ICAO: RPLN

Summary
- Airport type: Public
- Operator: Civil Aviation Authority of the Philippines
- Serves: Palanan, Isabela
- Location: Palanan Airport, Palanan, Isabela
- Elevation AMSL: 50 m / 167 ft
- Coordinates: 17°03′52″N 122°25′38″E
- Interactive map of Palanan Airport

Runways
Direction	Length		Surface
Direction	m	ft	Surface
02/20	1,000	3,280	Macadam

Palanan Airport is a community airport in the Philippines located in the Pacific coastal town of Palanan, Isabela. It is one of the two community airports in the province, the other being Maconacon Airport in the municipality of Maconacon.

== Airlines and destinations ==
Airlines	Destinations
Cyclone Airways	Cauayan
Northsky Air	Tuguegarao
Sky Pasada	Cauayan, Tuguegarao

== Statistics ==
- Passengers

In 2010, the airport handled 10,750 passengers passing through its terminal and gates.

Airlines	Passengers
Cyclone Airways	3,246
Sky Pasada	6,782
General Aviation	566
Military Personnel	156

== See also ==
- List of airports in the Philippines
