= Jorge Abad Airport =

Airport in Itbayat, Batanes, Philippines

Jorge Abad Airport Paliparang Jorge Abad Pagtayaban ti Jorge Abad
- IATA: none; ICAO: RPLT

Summary
- Airport type: Public
- Owner: Government of the Philippines
- Operator: Civil Aviation Authority of the Philippines
- Serves: Itbayat, Batanes
- Elevation AMSL: 328 ft (100 m)
- Coordinates: 20°43′01″N 121°49′01″E

Map
- Location in Batanes RPLT (Luzon) RPLT (Philippines)

Runways
Direction	Length		Surface
Direction	ft	m	Surface
18/36	2,628	801	Concrete

Jorge Abad Airport (Note: Filipino: Paliparang Jorge Abad, Ilocano: Pagtayaban ti Jorge Abad) (ICAO: RPLT), also known as Itbayat Airport, is an airport serving the island of Itbayat, the largest island in the province of Batanes, Philippines. The province's only other airport, Basco Airport, is located in the provincial capital, Basco, on Batan Island.

The airport is classified as a community airport by the Civil Aviation Authority of the Philippines (CAAP), a body of the Department of Transportation that is responsible for the operations of non-major airports.

== History ==
In March 2017, by virtue of a Sangguniang Bayan (municipal council) resolution, the northernmost airport in the Philippines was named after Jorge Abad - the first Ivatan cabinet member who, in 1955, was appointed Secretary of Public Works. His son, Florencio Abad, was instrumental in sourcing the funds for the airport construction during his time as congressional representative for Batanes. Manual labor was used during the airport's construction in the 1990s to level the uneven terrain, as the inaccessibility of the island made heavy equipment untenable for use.

== Airlines and destinations ==
Airlines	Destinations
Fliteline Airways	Basco
Aerospeed Air Transport Services	Basco
Northsky Air	Tuguegarao

== See also ==
- List of airports in the Philippines
