= Pacific Airways =

Pacific Airways may refer to:

- Pacificair (Pacific Airways Corporation), an airline in the Philippines
- Pacific Airways Inc., a small airline that operates DHC-2 Beaver float planes in Ketchikan, Alaska, United States

Pacific Airlines may refer to:

- Canadian Pacific Airlines (also known as CP Air), a defunct (1942–1987) airline, later known as Canadian Airlines and now forming part of Air Canada
- Pacific Airlines an airline in Vietnam

== See also ==
- Cathay Pacific Airways
