= Missionary route =

In transportation, a missionary route is a term that refers to a transport route that involves one or more points that have little or no service due to geographic limitation or absence of market viability. The term "missionary route" is used almost exclusively in the Philippines. In Indonesia, a similar term is referred to as a "pioneer route."

== Aviation ==
President Ferdinand Marcos implemented a one-airline policy in the Philippines in 1973. Philippine Airlines (PAL) was designated as the flag carrier and became the lone surviving airline, absorbing Air Manila and Filipinas Orient Airways. Subsidies from the government and income from better performing routes allowed PAL to service smaller airports. When the airline industry was opened to new players in 1995, PAL continued service to some missionary routes until 1999, shortly after it went into receivership.

Today, missionary routes have been taken over by smaller regional carriers such as Sky Pasada and SkyJet, and to some extent by low-cost carriers. As these routes are no longer heavily subsidized, air fare is higher and at times compatible with business class seats in major air routes.

== Maritime ==
The Maritime Industry Authority, an agency of the Department of Transportation defines which routes are considered as missionary and grants Operator Status for ship operators intending to serve them. It first released a list of identified missionary routes in 2005.
