= CYZ =

CYZ may refer to:

- Cauayan Airport (IATA: CYZ), an airport in Isabela, Philippines
- China Postal Airlines (ICAO: CYZ), a Chinese cargo airline
