= List of airlines of the Philippines =

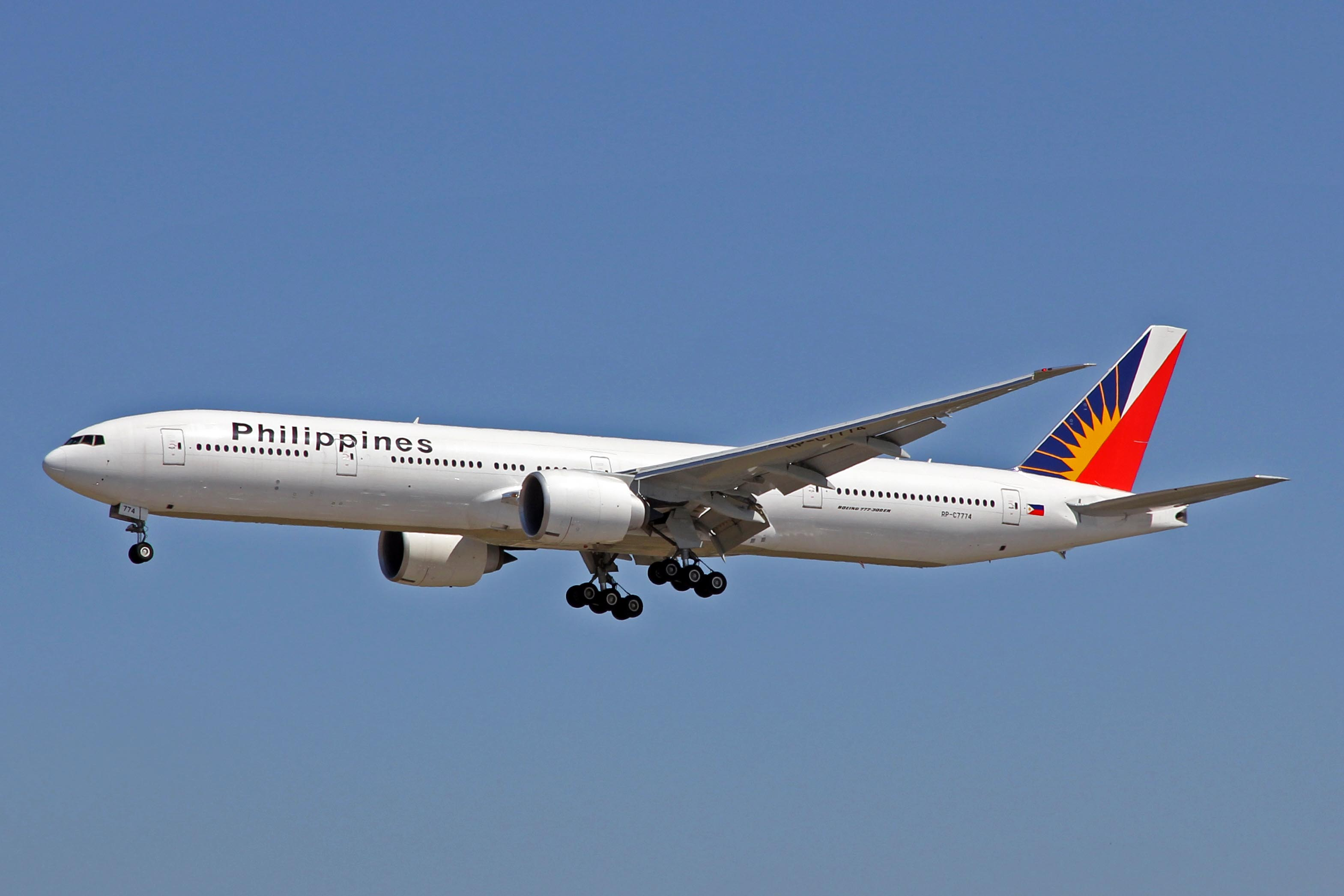
A Boeing 777 of Philippine Airlines, the country's flag carrier

This is a list of airlines in the Philippines. Air transportation in the Philippines goes back to the early days of aviation prior to World War II, during the American colonial period of the Philippines. Currently, the Philippines has several registered airline companies, but they are mostly chartered. There are two main domestic airline groups doing business as Philippine Airlines and Cebu Pacific, with AirAsia Philippines competing on some international routes. The domestic market is dominated by the Cebu Pacific group which has a 53% market share, followed by the Philippine Airlines group which has 31%, followed by AirAsia, having a 16% share.

This list of airlines enumerates local airlines in the Philippines which have a current air operator's certificate issued by the Civil Aviation Authority.

Note: Destinations in bold indicate primary hubs, those in italic indicate secondary hubs, while those with regular font indicate focus cities.

== Scheduled airlines ==
=== Mainline ===
Airline	Image	IATA	ICAO	Callsign	Hubs and focus cities	Founded	Notes
Cebu Pacific		5J	CEB	CEBU	**Manila**; Cebu; Clark; Davao; Iloilo	1988	Founded as Cebu Air and commenced operations in 1996 as Cebu Pacific.
Philippine Airlines		PR	PAL	PHILIPPINE	**Manila**; Cebu; Clark; Davao; Iloilo; Kalibo	1930	Founded as Philippine Aerial Taxi Company and commenced operations in 1941 as Philippine Air Lines, then 1970 as Philippine Airlines.
Philippines AirAsia		Z2	APG	COOL RED	**Manila**	2010	Founded as AirAsia Philippines and commenced operations in 2012, then 2015 as Philippines AirAsia.
Royal Air Philippines		RW	RYL	DOUBLE GOLD	**Clark**	2002	Founded as Royal Air Charter Service in 2002 and started regular scheduled services as Royal Air Philippines under new management since July 2017.

=== Regional ===
Airline	Image	IATA	ICAO	Callsign	Hubs and focus cities	Founded	Notes
Air Juan		AO		AIR JUAN	**Puerto Princesa**	2012	The First ever Seaplane Airline.
Alphaland Aviation		0A BG12**123**	BIC	BALESIN	**Clark**; Manila	2015	
Bangsamoro Airways					**Cotabato**	2024	
Cebgo		DG	SRQ	BLUE JAY	**Cebu**; Clark; Davao; Iloilo; Manila	1995	Founded as South East Asian Airlines. Operates as Cebu Pacific.
PAL Express		2P	GAP	AIRPHIL	**Manila**; Cebu; Clark; Davao; Iloilo; Zamboanga	1995	Founded as Air Philippines and commenced operations in 1996. Operates as Philippine Airlines.
SkyJet Airlines		M8	MSJ	MAGNUM AIR	**Manila**	2005	Commenced operations in 2012.
Sky Pasada		SP	WCC	SKY PASADA	**Manila**	2010	
Sunlight Air		2R	RLB	SUNLIGHT	**Manila**	2020	

== Charter airlines ==
Airline	Image	IATA	ICAO	Callsign	Hubs and focus cities	Founded	Notes
Air Link International Airways					**Manila**	1983	
Asian Aerospace Corporation					**Manila**	1996	
Cyclone Airways					**Cauayan**	1996	
INAEC					**Manila**	1993	
Island Aviation Inc.			SOY	SORIANO	**Manila**	2003	
Leading Edge Air Service					**Clark**		
Northsky Air					**Tuguegarao**	2010	
Pacificair		GX	PFR		**Manila**	1947	
Pacific Global One Aviation Company, Inc.					Manila	2011	
Platinum Skies Aviation					**Manila**	2017	
PhilJets Aero Services Inc.					**Manila**	2012	
SEAir International		XO	SGD	AIR BLUE	**Clark**; Manila	2012	Founded as a spin out from South East Asian Airlines. Now called SEAir International and operates as Charter and Cargo Airline.
Subic Seaplane					**Subic**		

== Cargo airlines ==
Airline	Image	IATA	ICAO	Callsign	Hubs and focus cities	Founded	Notes
2GO		PR	BOI	ABAIR	Manila	1988	2GO does not have any aircraft but uses the hold capacity of Cebu Pacific passenger aircraft.
PSI Air 2007		CM	PHP	SEXPOWER	**Clark**	2016	
Aero Bleu Airways					Manila	2021	
MET Express Air Corp.		MX	AMM		**Clark**	2021	
Filipino Cargo Airways		FC	FCA		Manila Cebu Clark Davao	2024	

== See also ==
- Lists of airlines
- List of airlines of Asia
- List of defunct airlines of the Philippines
- List of airports in the Philippines
