= Basco Airport =

Airport in Basco, Batanes, Philippines

Basco Airport Pagtayaban ti Basco Paliparan ng Basco
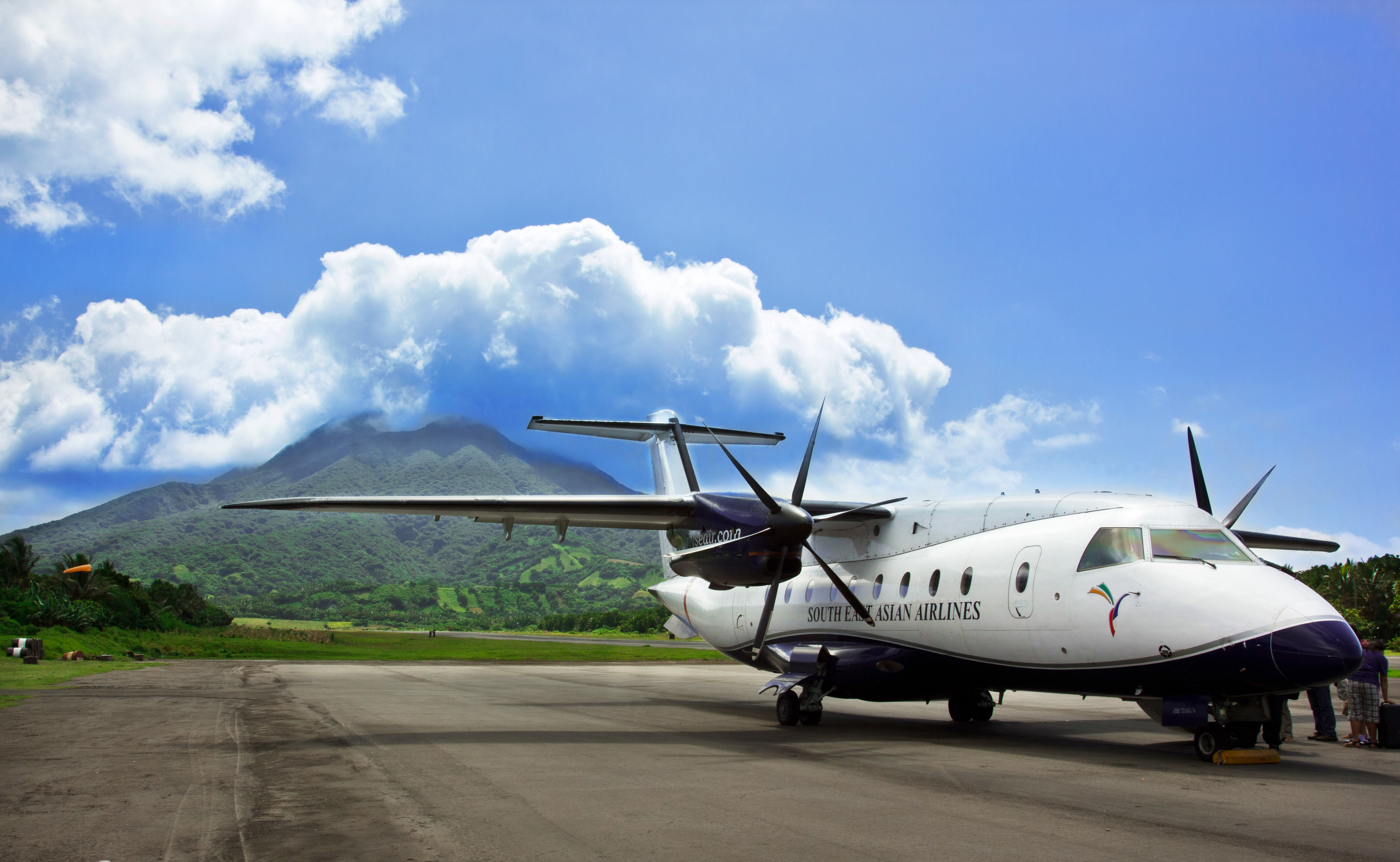
- IATA: BSO; ICAO: RPUO

Summary
- Airport type: Public
- Owner/Operator: Civil Aviation Authority of the Philippines
- Serves: Batanes
- Location: Basco, Batan Island
- Opened: 1930; 96 years ago
- Elevation AMSL: 89 m / 291 ft
- Coordinates: 20°27′05″N 121°58′48″E

Maps

Runways
Direction	Length		Surface
Direction	m	ft	Surface
06/24	1,244	4,081	Asphalt

Statistics (2017)
- Passengers: 104,089 ▲25.63%
- Aircraft movements: 2,702 ▲6.46%
- Cargo (in kg): 1,299,048 ▲15.78%
- Source: Statistics from eFOI

Basco Airport (IATA: BSO, ICAO: RPUO) is an airport serving the province of Batanes in the Philippines. It is located in the provincial capital, Basco. It is one of two airports in the Batanes Islands, the other being Itbayat Airport.

The airport is classified as a Class 2 principal (minor) domestic airport by the Civil Aviation Authority of the Philippines (CAAP), a body of the Department of Transportation that is responsible for the operations of non-major airports.

The airport is one of the hubs of Sky Pasada, a local carrier that flies short-haul routes between Basco and select airports in Northern Luzon.

Although the airport in the past was briefly served by international flights, the airport is not officially classified as an international airport.

== History ==
Basco Airport was first built in 1930 as Batan Airfield. During the Second World War, it became a target of Japanese forces during their invasion of the Philippines, seizing it along with the whole island on the first day of the Pacific War on 8 December 1941. Subsequently, the airfield was bombed by American planes in the closing months of the war in 1945, but the Japanese managed to hold on to it until their official surrender.

== Airlines and destinations ==
Airlines	Destinations
PAL Express	Clark
Sky Pasada	Tuguegarao, Calayan, Laoag
Fliteline Airways	Itbayat, Tuguegarao
Aerospeed Air Transport Services	Itbayat

== Statistics ==
Data from Civil Aviation Authority of the Philippines

=== Passenger movements ===
Year	Domestic	Change
2003	26,065	Steady
2004	26,933	▲3.33%
2005	25,376	▼5.78%
2006	22,748	▼10.36%
2007	19,550	▼14.06%
2008	24,288	▲24.24%
2009	19,308	▼20.50%
2010	26,089	▲35.12%
2011	28,428	▲8.97%
2012	25,588	▼9.99%
2013	32,467	▲26.88%
2014	60,683	▲86.91%
2015	73,541	▲21.19%
2016	82,853	▲12.66%
2017	104,089	▲25.63%

=== Aircraft movements ===
Year	Domestic	Change
2003	3,322	Steady
2004	2,734	▼17.70%
2005	3,240	▲18.51%
2006	2,726	▼15.86%
2007	1,204	▼55.83%
2008	766	▼36.38%
2009	1,246	▲62.66%
2010	709	▼43.10%
2011	1,926	▲171.65%
2012	1,934	▲0.42%
2013	2,512	▲29.89%
2014	1,890	▼24.76%
2015	2,160	▲14.29%
2016	2,538	▲17.50%
2017	2,702	▲6.46%

=== Cargo movements ===
Year	Domestic (kg)	Change
2003	247,978	Steady
2004	280,210	▲13.00%
2005	346,017	▲23.48%
2006	378,055	▲9.26%
2007	344,832	▼8.79%
2008	301,968	▼12.43%
2009	10,980	▼96.36%
2010	386,512	▲3,420.15%
2011	388,150	▲0.42%
2012	361,389	▼6.89%
2013	510,172	▲41.17%
2014	701,712	▲37.54%
2015	866,985	▲23.55%
2016	1,122,039	▲29.42%
2017	1,299,048	▲15.78%

== See also ==
- List of airports in the Philippines
