= Transportation in Tacloban =

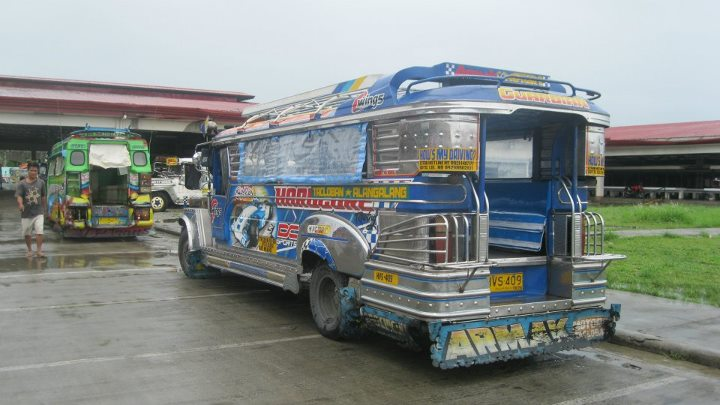
Jeeps had almost the same function of a bus but for shorter distances.

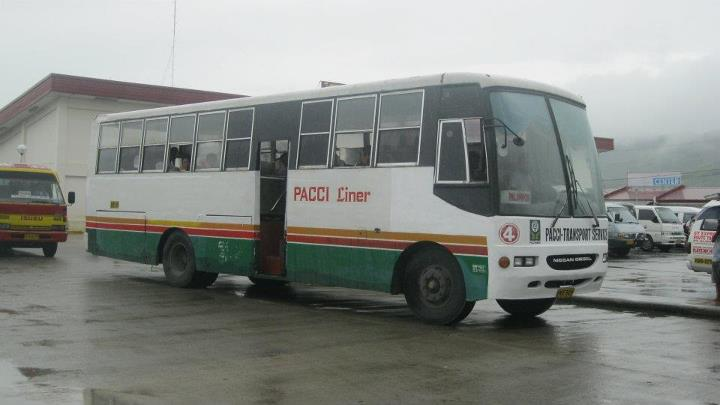
Buses are often used for long distance travels.

Transportation in Tacloban is similar to that of other large cities in the Philippines, but with a high degree of private transport. The region around Tacloban is a hub of transportation services and has a high degree of air connectivity and complemented with undeveloped highways and surface streets. There is an airport for domestic, and general aviation; buses; motorcycle services, walking, bicycling, and commercial shipping. The focus of the public transport system is the jeepney service.

== Air Transport ==
Cebu Pacific operates 4x daily flights from Manila and daily flights from Cebu City and Iloilo. Philippine Airlines and PAL Express also connects the two cities from Manila (4x daily) and Cebu (daily). Philippines AirAsia also offers daily flights from Manila to Tacloban and vice versa. The Daniel Z. Romualdez Airport which is currently under rehabilitation to develop it to have an international airport status just like other airports in the Visayas Region. And rename it to Daniel Romualdez International Airport.

The Tacloban Airport was effectively destroyed by winds averaging to 195 mph and a 13 ft (4 m) storm surge during Typhoon Haiyan. The airport terminal and the control tower were utterly demolished, and the airport was rendered unusable. However, on 11 November 2013, the airport reopened, but for turboprop aircraft only. In 2014 the runway was closed to Airbuses for over three months for massive repairs.

In April 2015 the airport was closed to jets for two weeks for runway repairs.
