= Asian Spirit Flight 100 =

1999 aviation accident in the Philippines

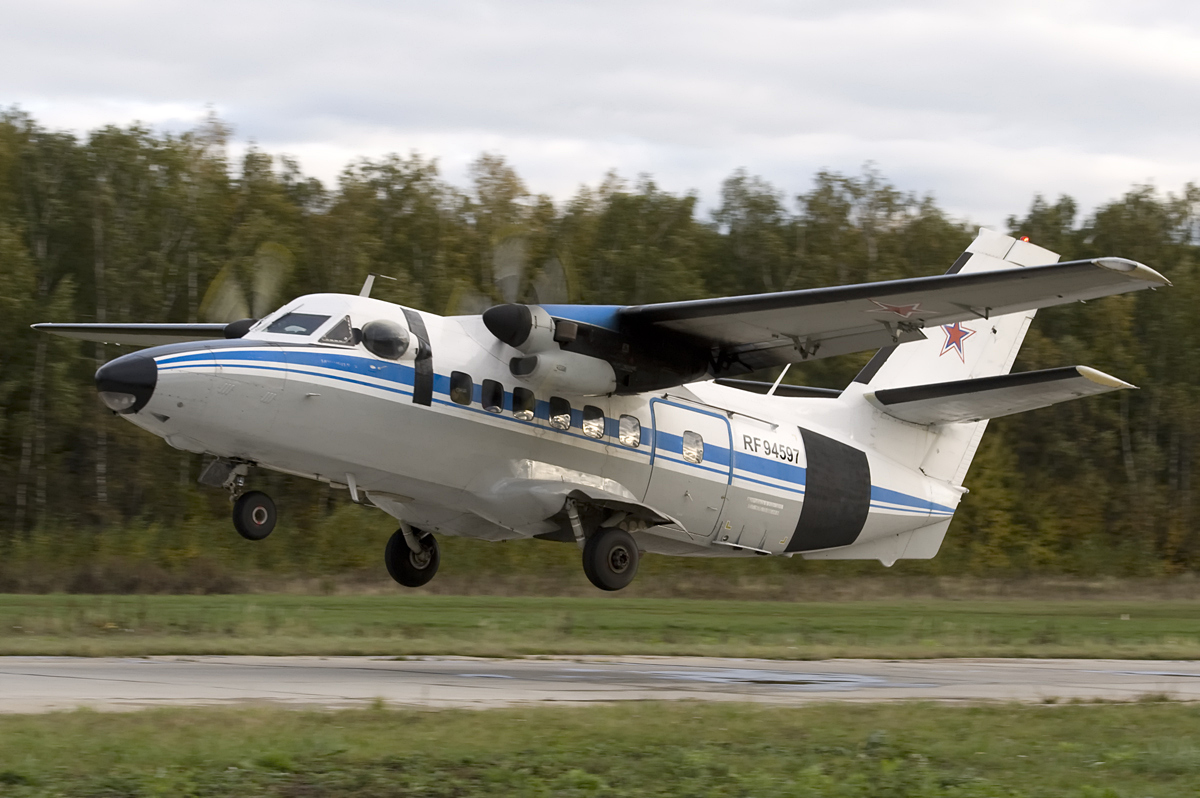
- A Let L-410, similar to the aircraft involved

Accident
- Date: 7 December 1999
- Summary: Controlled flight into terrain
- Site: Between Kasibu, Nueva Vizcaya and Cabarroguis, Quirino, Philippines; 16°19′1″N 121°16′59″E

Aircraft
- Aircraft type: Let L-410 Turbolet
- Operator: Asian Spirit
- Registration: RP-C3883
- Flight origin: Ninoy Aquino International Airport
- Destination: Cauayan Airport
- Occupants: 17
- Passengers: 15
- Crew: 2
- Fatalities: 17
- Survivors: 0

Asian Spirit Flight 100 was a Let L-410 Turbolet that crashed into a mountainside between the municipalities of Kasibu, Nueva Vizcaya, and Cabarroguis, Quirino, in the Philippines on December 7, 1999. The aircraft was en route to Cauayan in Isabela from Ninoy Aquino International Airport in Manila. All fifteen passengers and two crew aboard the flight died in the incident.

== Accident ==
The aircraft departed the Manila Domestic Terminal of Ninoy Aquino International Airport at 8:34 am PST, with the pilot, Rolando Salandanan, last making contact with air traffic control at 9:19 am PST as he was approaching Cauayan Airport, with no indication of a problem aboard the aircraft. Flight 100 was scheduled to land at Cauayan at 9:37 am PST. The wreckage of Flight 100 would be found the next day, December 8.
