= Philippine Airlines Flight 215 =

1970 airplane bombing

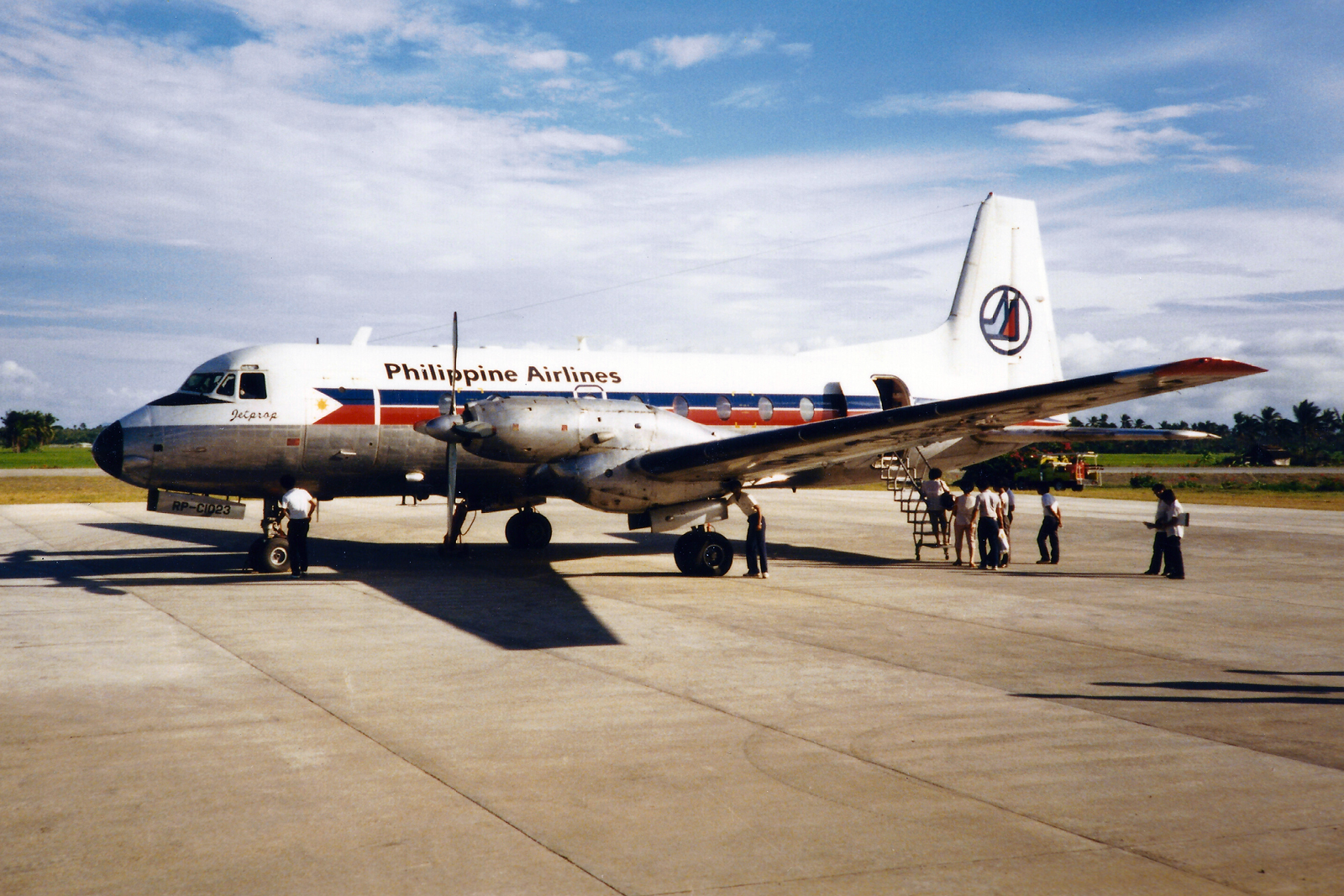
- A Hawker Siddeley HS 748 similar to the one involved.

Bombing
- Date: April 21, 1970
- Summary: Bomb explosion, cause unknown
- Site: Near Cabanatuan, Philippines

Aircraft
- Aircraft type: Hawker Siddeley HS-748-209 Srs. 2
- Operator: Philippine Airlines
- Registration: PI-C1022
- Flight origin: Cauayan Airport, Cauayan, Isabela, Philippines
- Destination: Manila International Airport, Pasay, Rizal, Philippines
- Passengers: 32
- Crew: 4
- Fatalities: 36
- Survivors: 0

Philippine Airlines Flight 215 was a domestic Philippine Airlines flight from Cauayan Airport to Manila International Airport which exploded en route to Manila on April 21, 1970.

== Aircraft ==
The aircraft was a Hawker Siddeley HS-748 Series 2 and was manufactured in 1968, before being delivered to Philippine Airlines registered as PI-C1022.

== Crash ==
At 11:34am, captain Diego Liwag requested permission to make an instrument approach to Manila. Shortly after, while the aircraft was cruising at 10,500 feet (3,200 m), a bomb exploded in the aircraft's lavatory leading to a rapid decompression and a complete separation of the tail section, leading into an uncontrolled descent and in-flight breakup before crashing into a rural area near Cabanatuan, Nueva Ecija.

The flight was around 70 miles (110 km) from Manila when the explosion occurred. All 32 passengers and 4 crew were killed in the incident, and wreckage was strewn across a wide area.

== Investigation and aftermath ==
A bomb in the lavatory was the determined cause of the incident, though it was not able to be traced to an exact source. Possible causes included a suicide bombing, political sabotage contributed by limited airport security development at the time, though in the end was marked as "unlawful interference".
