= Marinduque Airport =

Airport serving Marinduque, Philippines

Marinduque Airport Paliparan ng Marinduque
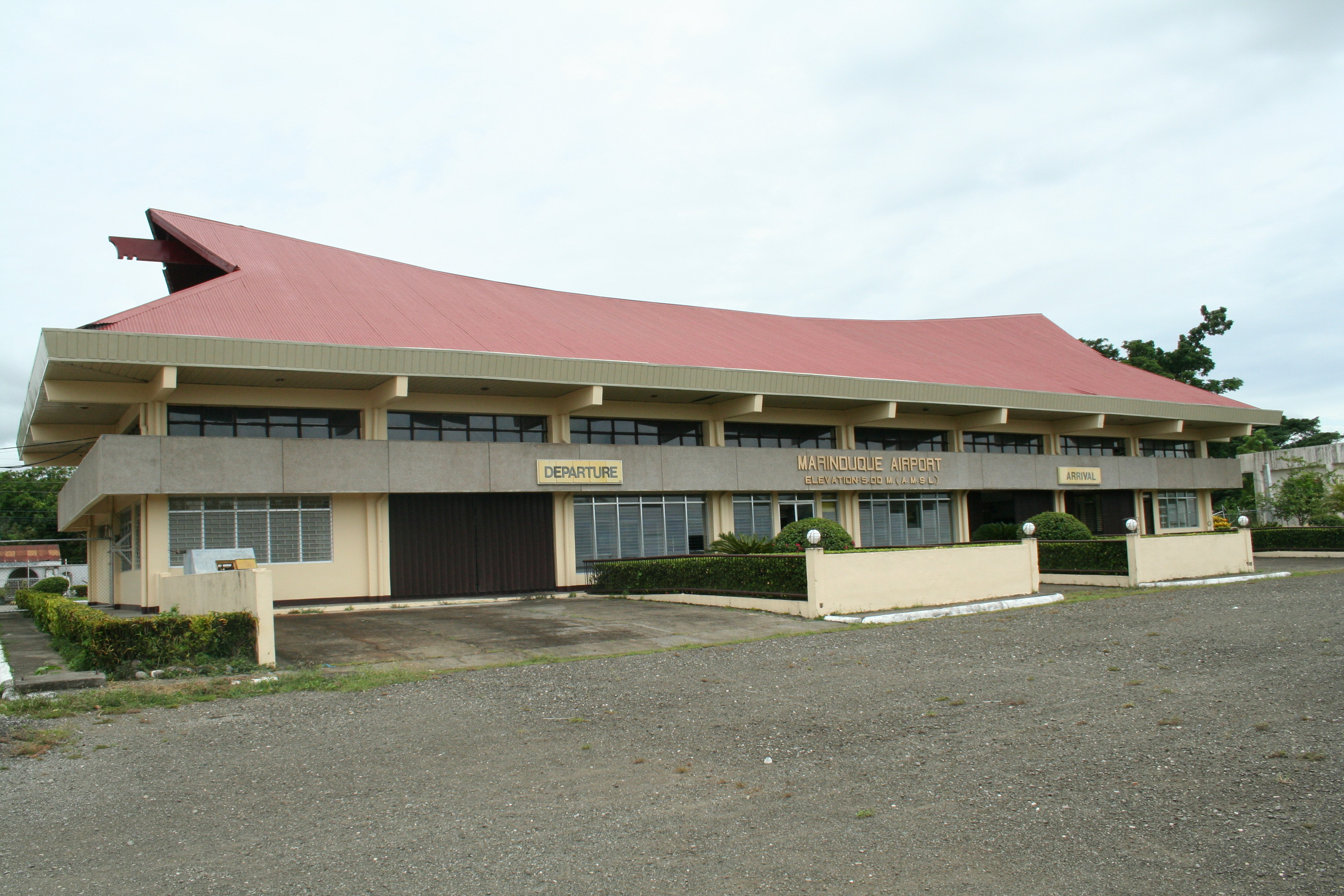
- Exterior of Marinduque Airport in 2008, prior to the airport's rehabilitation.
- IATA: MRQ; ICAO: RPUW

Summary
- Airport type: Public
- Owner/Operator: Civil Aviation Authority of the Philippines
- Serves: Marinduque
- Location: Barangay Masiga, Gasan, Marinduque, Philippines
- Elevation AMSL: 5 m / 16 ft
- Coordinates: 13°21′36″N 121°49′31″E

Map

Runways
Direction	Length		Surface
Direction	m	ft	Surface
16/34	1,534	5,033	Concrete

Statistics (2013)
- Passengers: 5,415
- Aircraft movements: 252
- Tonnes of cargo: 12
- Statistics from the Civil Aviation Authority of the Philippines.

Marinduque Airport (IATA: MRQ, ICAO: RPUW) is the only airport located on and serving the island province of Marinduque in the Philippines. It is in Barangay Masiga in the town of Gasan, near the border with the provincial capital, Boac. It is classified as a Class 2 principal (minor domestic) airport by the Civil Aviation Authority of the Philippines (CAAP), an attached agency of the Department of Transportation that is responsible for the operations of airports in the Philippines (except the major international airports).

== History and expansion ==
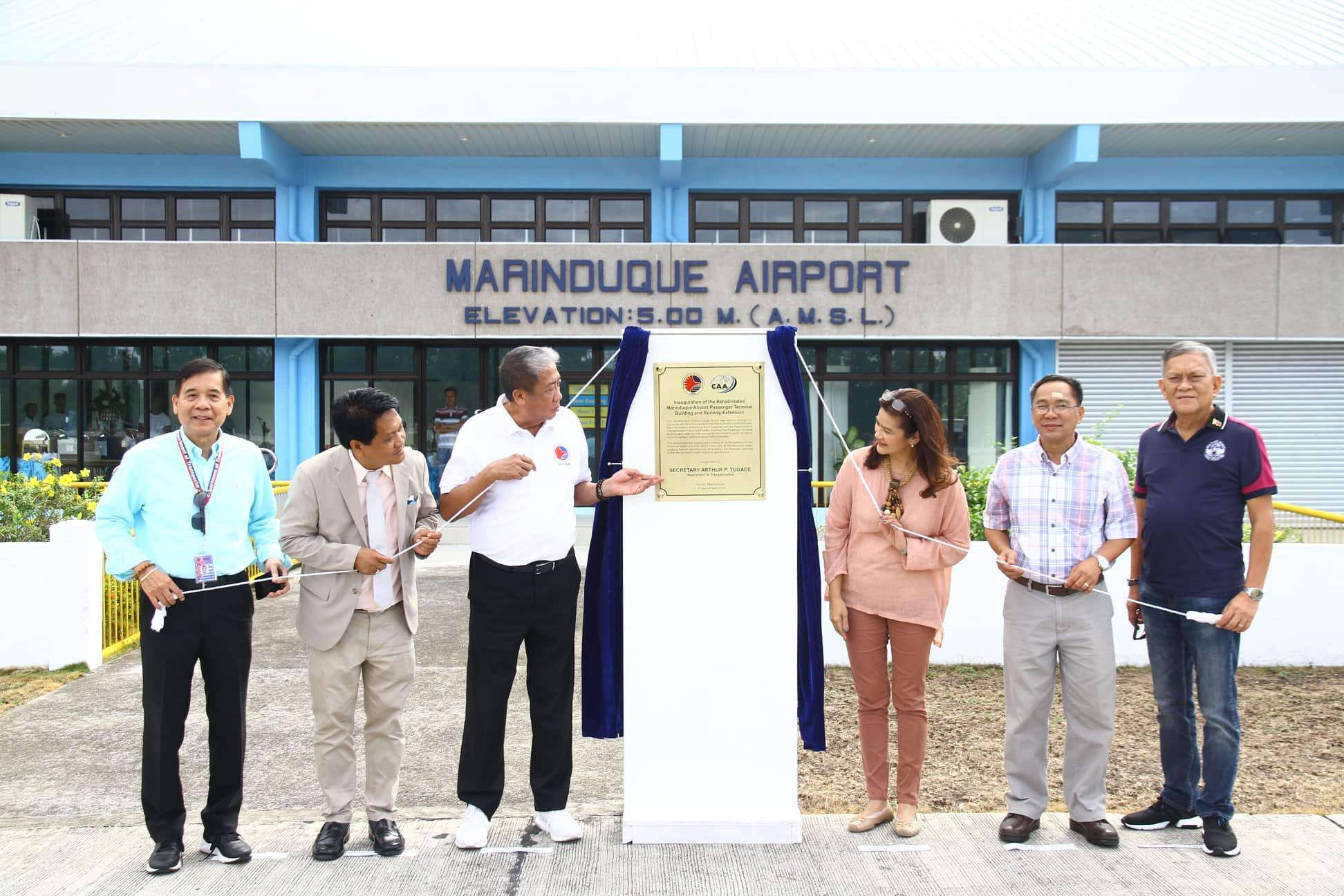
Inauguration of the rehabilitated Marinduque Airport on April 11, 2019, led by Transportation Secretary Arthur Tugade.

Marinduque Airport had been previously served by several airlines. Zest Airways was the last airline to serve the airport, ceasing service in 2013 after retiring their fleet of Xian MA60 turboprop aircraft. Philippine Airlines meanwhile used to serve the airport with its fleet of NAMC YS-11 and Fokker 50 aircraft before canceling service during the 1997 Asian financial crisis, and South East Asian Airlines used to fly four times weekly between 2009 and 2010, until when the Let L-410 Turbolet aircraft used to service the route was grounded.

In 2010, the Department of Transportation and Communications (DOTC) commenced a ₱40 million airport development project meant for repaving the airport's runway. The next year, an additional ₱5 million was allocated for the repaving of the runway's extension which had previously been constructed, and in October 2014, the DOTC announced a ₱8.45 million development project for the airport, leading to the construction of a new administration building and other improvements to the facility. In 2017, the CAAP allocated ₱15 million to complete construction work.

Airport construction was delayed for years, initially due to bureaucratic delays on the part of the DOTC, but later on due to political differences, with Governor Carmencita Reyes and her administration standing accused of withholding permits from the winning contractor, who happened to be her political rival, so that the project could be rebid to a contractor more favorable to her. The Office of the Ombudsman subsequently filed graft charges against Reyes and other provincial officials in light of the controversy.

Despite additional construction delays caused by a lack of materials and equipment, runway construction work was completed on November 9, 2018 at a cost of ₱12.8 million, while terminal renovation work worth ₱9 million was completed on March 4, 2019. Cebu Pacific's regional subsidiary, Cebgo, subsequently began service to the airport on April 1, 2019, and a formal inauguration of the airport's renovated facilities took place ten days later.

== Structure and facilities ==
Marinduque Airport is equipped with a 1,534-meter (5,033 ft) long, concrete-paved runway. Extended from its previous length of 1,400 meters (4,600 ft), it is capable of supporting turboprop aircraft like the ATR 72 and the Bombardier Dash 8.

The airport's terminal building has an area of 560 square meters (6,000 sq ft). Renovation work on the terminal entailed dropping the building's ceiling, installing an air conditioning system and X-ray machines, and replacing the building's old accordion walls with glass walls. A closed-circuit television system was also installed. Additional renovation work, scheduled for completion in 2020, will include the construction of a drainage canal, a power house, new communal toilets, and a covered pathway and waiting areas.

In 2015, the Sangguniang Panlalawigan of Marinduque passed an ordinance banning stray domesticated animals from the airport property and its perimeter.
