= Cauayan Airport =

Airport in Isabela, Philippines

Cauayan Airport Pagtayaban ti Cauayan Paliparan ng Cauayan
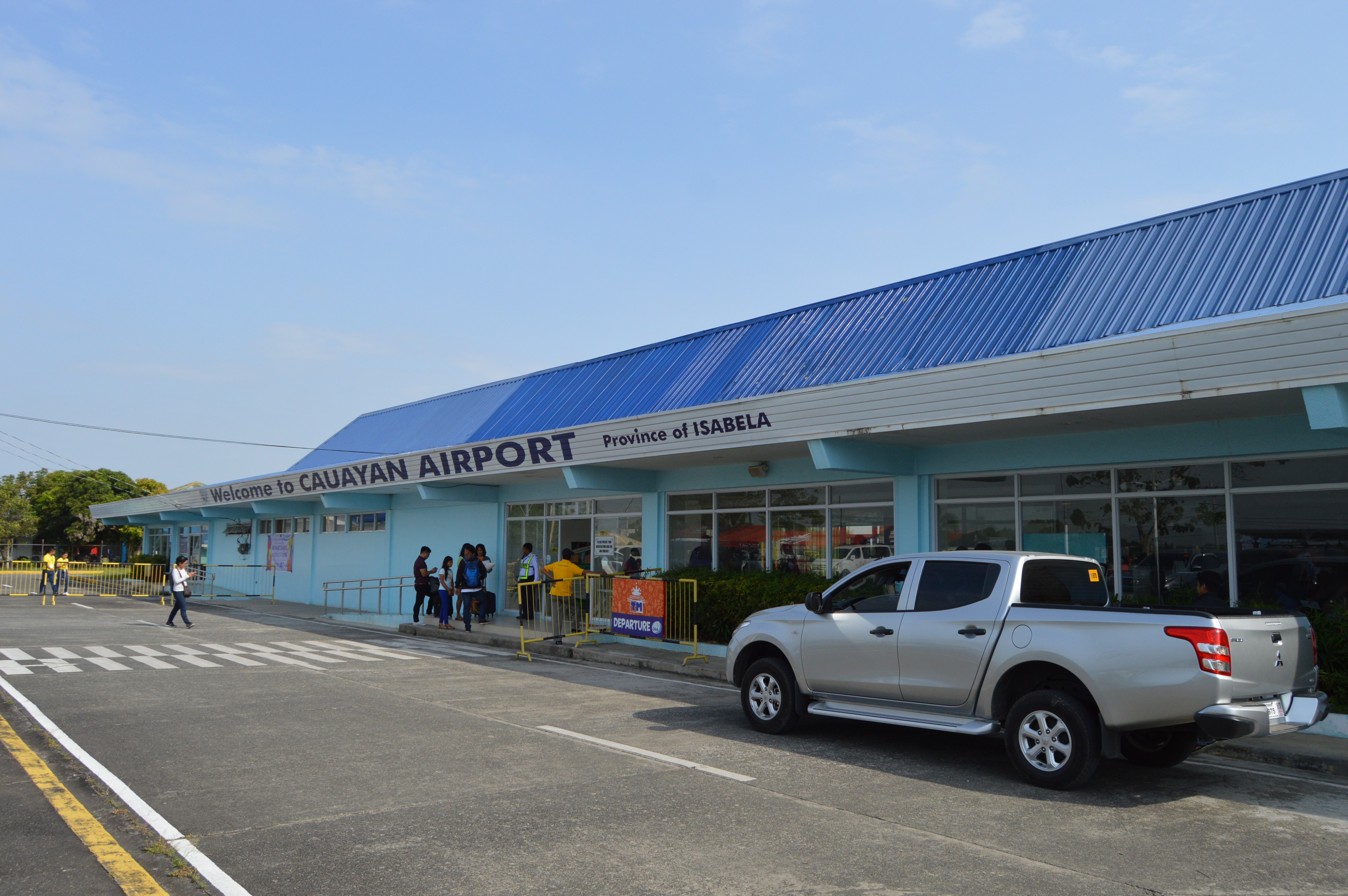
- The airport in 2018.
- IATA: CYZ; ICAO: RPUY

Summary
- Airport type: Public
- Owner/Operator: Civil Aviation Authority of the Philippines
- Serves: Cauayan
- Elevation AMSL: 61 m (200 ft)
- Coordinates: 16°55′48″N 121°45′11″E

Map
- Location within Luzon Location within Philippines

Runways
Direction	Length		Surface
Direction	m	ft	Surface
12/30	2,397	6,875	Asphalt

Statistics (2021)
- Passenger movements: 66,415
- Aircraft movements: 10,322
- Cargo movements: 1,107,265
- Source: CAAP

Cauayan Airport (IATA: CYZ, ICAO: RPUY) is an airport serving the general area of Cauayan, a city in Isabela province in the Philippines. It is one of three commercial airports in Isabela, the others being Palanan Airport in the town of Palanan and Maconacon Airport in the town of Maconacon. It is classified as a secondary airport, or a minor commercial domestic airport, by the Civil Aviation Authority of the Philippines, a body of the Department of Transportation responsible for the operations of not only this airport but also of all other airports in the Philippines except the major international airports.

== History ==
In May 1952, the Philippine Senate discussed plans to improve Cauayan Airport along with Luena Airport and Catarman Airport, with a total budget allocation of ₱200,000. (Note: Not accounting for inflation.)

On November 5, 1967, President Ferdinand Marcos visited Cauayan Airport to meet with farmer representatives from the province of Isabela. The discussion centered on Irrigation and other agricultural concerns, after which the President returned to Manila.

From 1999 to 2008, the airport did not host any commercial flights. Several proposals were made to restore service, including a Manila–Cauayan route and an extended route to Tuguegarao Airport. After nearly a decade without commercial operations, Cauayan Airport reopened on August 15, 2008, with PAL Express flights, marking the return of Philippine Airlines to the city after suspending its services in 1994. Today, Cebu Pacific and Philippine Airlines operates Airbus A320 aircraft on the Manila–Cauayan–Manila route.

The airport has since undergone renovations and has been night-rated, enabling both landings and takeoffs during nighttime operations.

== Nearby accommodation ==
A recommended accommodation near the airport is the Marco Paulo Hotel and Restobar, which offers convenient access due to its proximity.

== Airlines and destinations ==
Airlines	Destinations
Cebu Pacific	Manila
Cyclone Airways	Palanan
PAL Express	Manila
Sky Pasada	Maconacon, Palanan

== Incidents and accidents ==
- Cauayan Airport was involved in two fatal incidents in Philippine aviation: Philippine Airlines Flight 215, which was bound for Manila, and Asian Spirit Flight 100, which originated from Manila. The crash of Asian Spirit Flight 100 in 1999 ultimately led to the suspension of the Manila–Cauayan route.
- On January 24, 2023, a Cessna 206 bound for Maconacon crashed in Divilacan, Isabela, killing all six people on board. It took authorities more than a month to locate the wreckage.

== See also ==
- List of airports in the Philippines
