= Philippines AirAsia =

Low-cost airline of the Philippines

Philippines AirAsia, Inc.

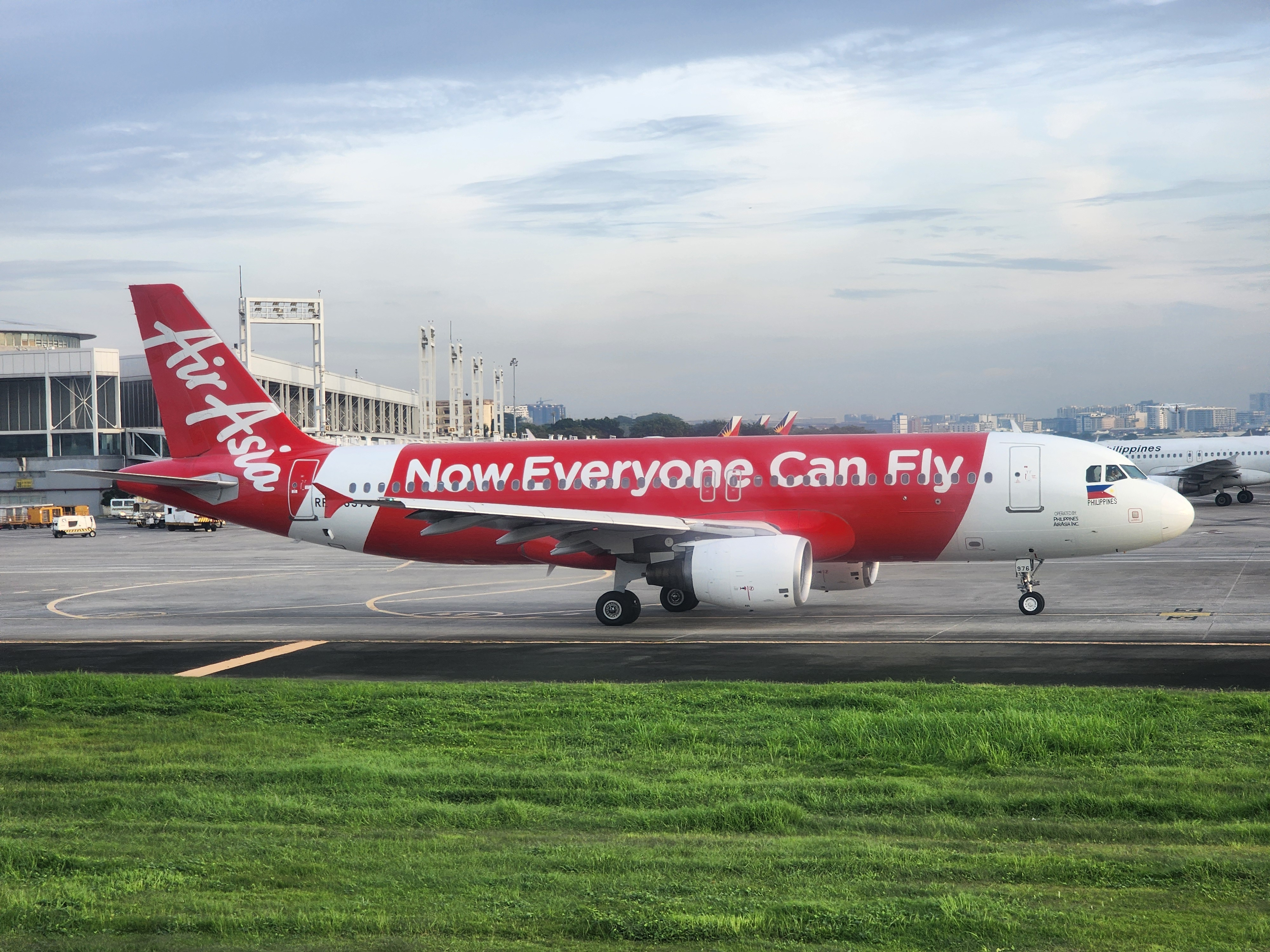
- Philippines AirAsia Airbus A320
| IATA | ICAO | Call sign |
|---|---|---|
| Z2 | APG | COOL RED |
- Founded: December 16, 2010; 15 years ago (as AirAsia Philippines)
- Commenced operations: March 28, 2012; 14 years ago (as AirAsia Philippines); December 6, 2015; 10 years ago (as Philippines AirAsia)
- AOC #: 2009003
- Operating bases: Ninoy Aquino International Airport
- Frequent-flyer program: BIG Loyalty Programme
- Fleet size: 15
- Destinations: 19
- Parent company: AirAsia Group Berhad
- Headquarters: Pasay, Metro Manila, Philippines
- Website: www.airasia.com

Philippines AirAsia is a Philippine low-cost airline based at Ninoy Aquino International Airport in Pasay, Metro Manila. The airline is the Philippine affiliate of the Malaysian AirAsia. The airline started as a joint venture among three Filipino investors and AirAsia Investments Ltd. (later AirAsia Aviation Limited), a subsidiary of AirAsia Berhad.

== History ==
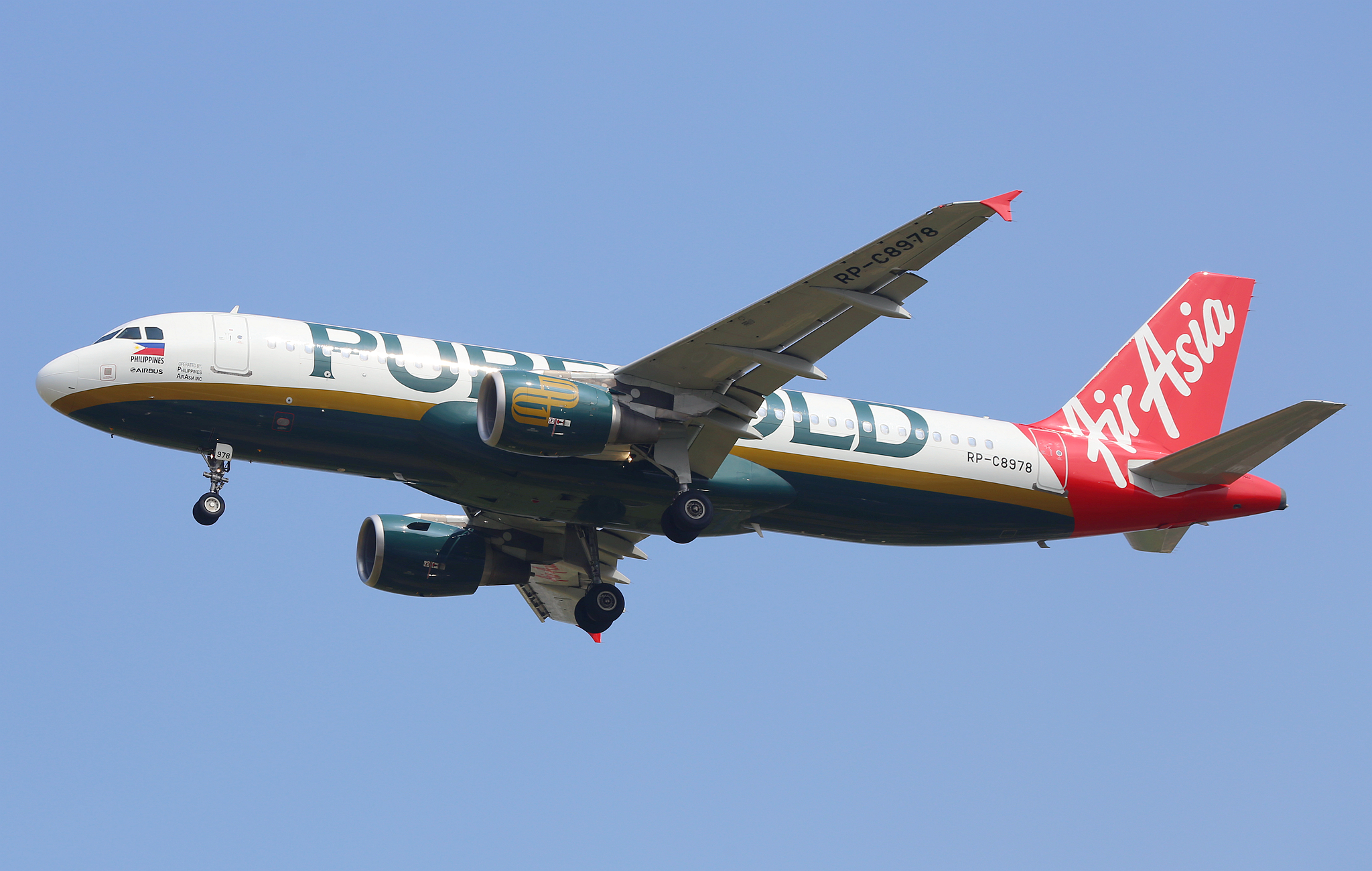
An Airbus A320-200 operated by Philippines AirAsia in Puregold livery in 2017

AirAsia Philippines was formally launched on December 16, 2010. On August 15, 2011, AirAsia Philippines took delivery of its first brand-new Airbus A320 aircraft. The airline planned to start operations by 2011 but was delayed due to the long duration of processing the new requirements instituted in 2008.

On February 7, 2012, the airline received its air operator's certificate (AOC). The airline commenced operations on March 28 by launching flights from its base at Clark International Airport to Kalibo and Davao City. It partnered with Victory Liner, one of the largest provincial bus companies operating in the Philippines, to provide free shuttle service for inbound and outbound passengers of Clark International Airport. Within that year, in addition to its first two destinations, AirAsia Philippines launched flights to Puerto Princesa, Kuala Lumpur, Hong Kong, Singapore, and Taipei.

On March 11, 2013, an agreement was made between AirAsia Philippines to swap shares with Philippine-based airline Zest Airways. Zest Airways received a mix of $16 million cash and a 13% share in AirAsia Philippines, while AirAsia Philippines now owns 85% of Zest Airways, with 49% of its voting rights. The deal closed on May 10, 2013, and Zest Airways was rebranded AirAsia Zest. The agreement also gave AirAsia Philippines access to Ninoy Aquino International Airport, allowing further growth of its route network. By October 2013, AirAsia Philippines closed its Clark base to reduce further losses, and moved its operations to NAIA, initially at Terminal 4. It later moved its international flights to Terminal 3 by 2014. After two years of operating under separate brands, the two airlines merged to a single AOC in September 2015, with the AirAsia Zest brand being retired in December.

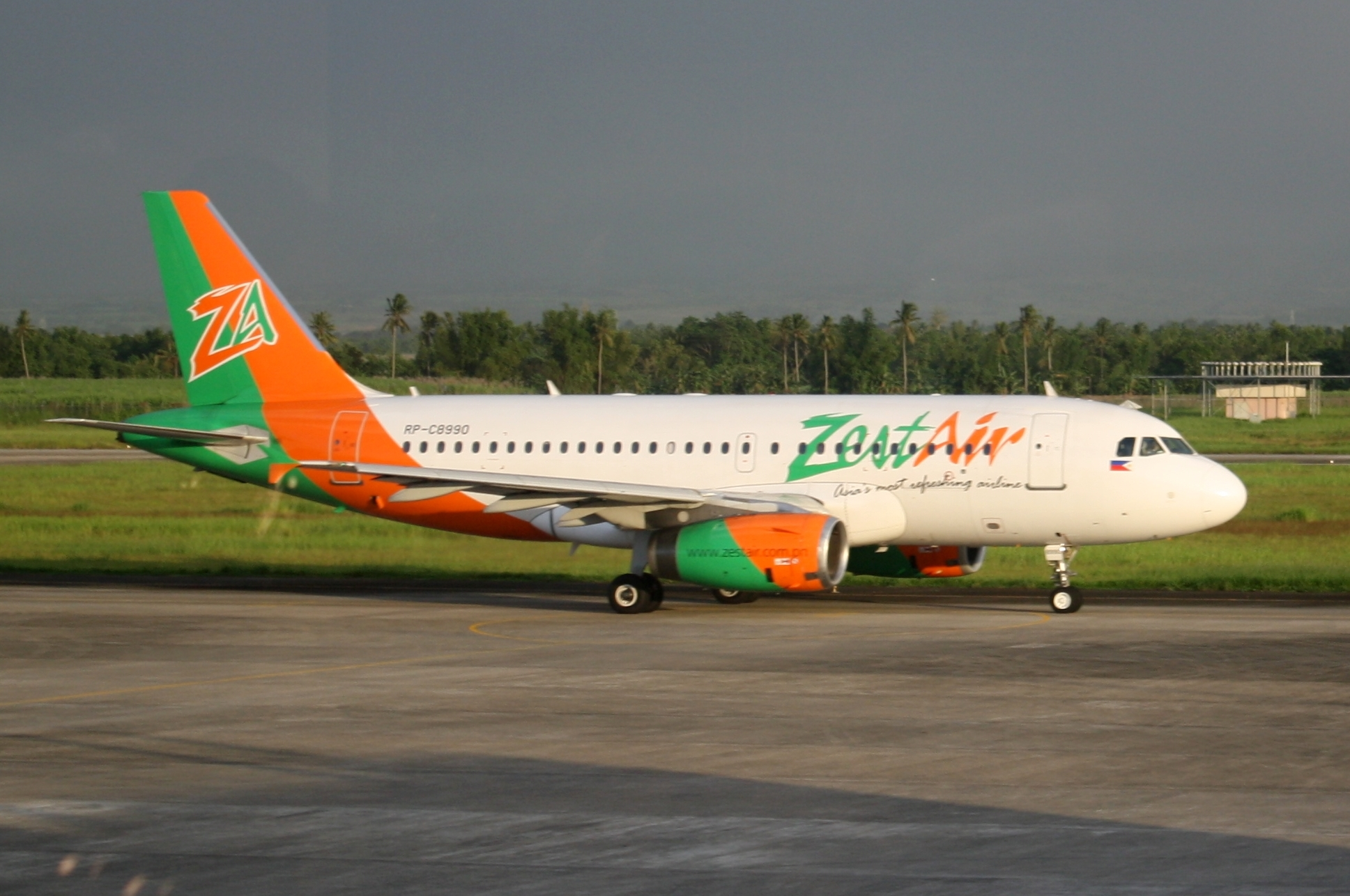
An Airbus A320 formerly operated by Zest Air, later rebranded as AirAsia Zest after its acquisition by AirAsia Philippines in 2013.

It continued its domestic and international expansion; in March 2017, the airline launched flights to Godofredo P. Ramos Airport — the closest airport to Boracay, and reopened its Clark base. In October 2017, it began flying to Iloilo — a destination once served by AirAsia Zest, and started flying to Ho Chi Minh City in November. The following year, it opened a base in Cagayan de Oro.

On July 1, 2019, Philippines AirAsia launched its first flights to Japan, starting with Osaka. On October 27, it started flying to Bacolod — another former AirAsia Zest destination — and was one of the highlights of that year's MassKara Festival.

The COVID-19 pandemic has adversely affected Philippines AirAsia's business. Plans for Philippines AirAsia to debut in the Philippine Stock Exchange (PSE) within 2020 was deferred in March, with the airline management deciding to focus on expanding its domestic operations after a government ban on China and South Korea in response to the worsening health situation threatened 30% of the airlines' revenue. It also retrenched 624 employees due to the pandemic. Flights to General Santos and Zamboanga City — which were originally set to launch in March — began in October.

As travel restrictions eased in 2022, Philippines AirAsia started to rebuild its network by adding more flights, launching flights to Dumaguete and Roxas City, and resuming most international flights starting May 27, 2022. In February 2023, it launched daily flights to Tokyo, and resumed flights to Guangzhou, Shenzhen, and Macau. Amid a fleet shortage, flights to General Santos ended in 2022, while flights to Dumaguete and Zamboanga ended in 2023.

On July 1, 2023, Philippines AirAsia transferred its domestic operations at Ninoy Aquino International Airport (NAIA) from the highly congested Terminal 4 to the larger Terminal 2. Although its international flights remained at Terminal 3, it requested to the Manila International Airport Authority (MIAA) to transfer its international flights to Terminal 1 for operational efficiency. This was rejected by MIAA due to space limitations, given that flag carrier Philippine Airlines had predominantly occupied the terminal with little space for AirAsia to fit in. Eventually, Philippines AirAsia transferred its international flights to Terminal 1 on March 29, 2026, as part of a terminal optimization program by the airport's operator, the New NAIA Infrastructure Corp. (NNIC), to alleviate congestion and enhance passenger flow.

In 2024, Philippines AirAsia terminated all flights to mainland China due to weak demand amid geopolitical tensions. On October 18, 2024, the airline suspended its inter-island flights out of Cebu, effectively closing its hub at Mactan–Cebu International Airport. It attempted to launch flights to Nagoya in the same month, but were cancelled due to operational circumstances. After nearly thirteen years, on January 22, 2025, Philippines AirAsia ended flights to Davao City due to competitive pricing; it plans to reassign its aircraft to its top-performing destinations instead, like Bohol, Boracay, Palawan, and Tacloban.

In March 2025, Philippines AirAsia revisited its plans to debut in the PSE, while announcing its fleet expansion.

On September 23, 2025, Philippines AirAsia relaunched its Cebu hub, with flights beginning on November 15.

On June 3, 2026, the Civil Aviation Authority of the Philippines (CAAP) issued a cease-and-desist directive to Philippines AirAsia over unpaid obligations. According to InsiderPH, the airline was given three days to settle its remaining balance of ₱271.94 million or risk a shutdown of its operations. The report stated that the carrier had reduced its debt from ₱833.7 million but had not fully settled its obligations. AirAsia Philippines stated that its flight operations would continue despite the unpaid fees and advised passengers that services would proceed as scheduled. Eventually, the CAAP reported the next day that the airline had paid the fees, penalties and interest on delay of payment since 2021 for unpaid fees covering air navigation charges, landing and parking fees, passenger service charges, and other airport-related assessments totaling US$4.7 Million and the airline is now out of risk of seizure of operations.

== Corporate affairs ==
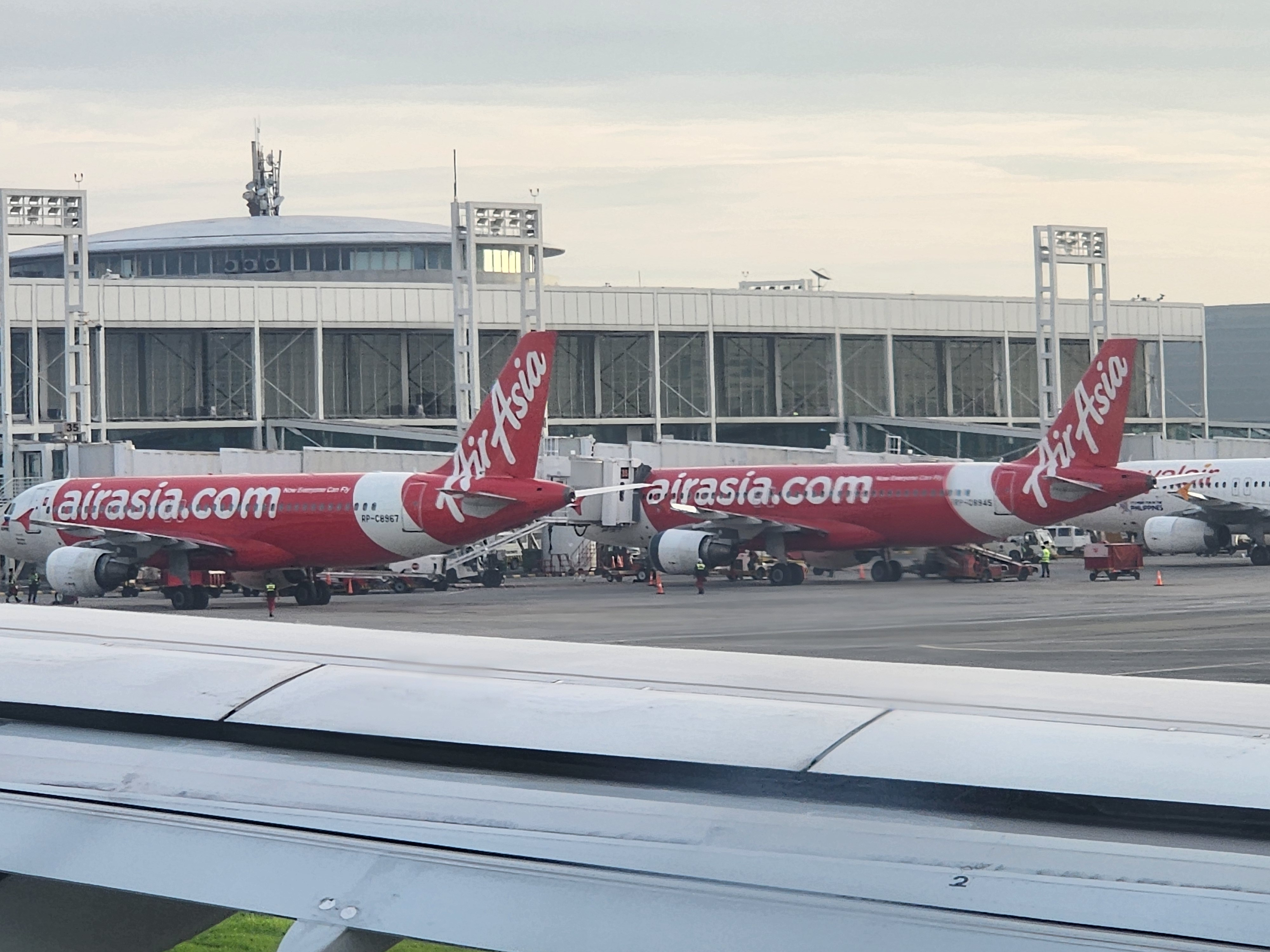
Since 2023, Philippines AirAsia has used Ninoy Aquino International Airport Terminal 2 as its domestic hub in Manila.

Philippines AirAsia is headquartered at the RedPoint office at Ninoy Aquino International Airport Terminal 3 in Pasay, Metro Manila. RedPoint has been the airline's headquarters since October 2019; the airline was previously headquartered at the Salem Complex near the former site of NAIA Terminal 4.

The airline began as a joint venture between three Filipino businessmen and AirAsia. Sixty percent of the airline is owned by Filipino investors Antonio O. Cojuangco, Jr., former owner of Associated Broadcasting Company and owner of Dream Satellite TV, Michael L. Romero, a real estate developer and port operator, and Marianne Hontiveros, a former music industry executive and TV host. The remaining 40% is owned by AirAsia Investments Ltd. (later AirAsia Aviation Limited) of Malaysia. The Public Service Act of the Philippines, prior to its amendment in 2022, only allowed a foreign direct investment of up to 40% in Philippine-registered airlines.

In June 2019, Romero's F&S Holdings bought the shares owned by Alfredo Yao and Hontiveros, thus becoming the new majority shareholder in the company. Four months later, Romero acquired Cojuangco's shares, becoming the sole local owner (and parent company) of the airline. In June 2023, F&S Holdings sold all of its shares to AA Com Travel Philippines for an undisclosed amount, consolidating ownership under AirAsia.

== Destinations ==
As of October 2026, Philippines AirAsia flies (or has flown) to the following destinations:

| Country | City | Airport | Notes | Refs |
|---|---|---|---|---|
| China | Chengdu | Chengdu Shuangliu International Airport | Terminated | |
| China | Guangzhou | Guangzhou Baiyun International Airport | Terminated | |
| China | Hangzhou | Hangzhou Xiaoshan International Airport | Terminated | |
| China | Kunming | Kunming Changshui International Airport | Terminated | |
| China | Shanghai | Shanghai Pudong International Airport | Terminated | |
| China | Shenzhen | Shenzhen Bao'an International Airport | Terminated | |
| Hong Kong | Hong Kong | Hong Kong International Airport | Terminated | |
| Indonesia | Denpasar | Ngurah Rai International Airport | Terminated | |
| Indonesia | Jakarta | Soekarno–Hatta International Airport | Terminated | |
| Japan | Nagoya | Chubu Centrair International Airport | Terminated (Note: Terminated before launch) | |
| Japan | Osaka | Kansai International Airport | Terminated | |
| Japan | Tokyo | Narita International Airport | | |
| Macau | Macau | Macau International Airport | | |
| Malaysia | Kota Kinabalu | Kota Kinabalu International Airport | | |
| Malaysia | Kuala Lumpur | Kuala Lumpur International Airport | Ends 23 October 2026 | |
| Philippines (Central Visayas) | Cebu | Mactan–Cebu International Airport | Base | |
| Philippines (Central Visayas) | Dumaguete | Sibulan Airport | Terminated | |
| Philippines (Central Visayas) | Tagbilaran | Bohol–Panglao International Airport | Terminated | |
| Philippines (Central Visayas) | Tagbilaran | Tagbilaran Airport | Airport closed | |
| Philippines (Central Luzon) | Clark | Clark International Airport | | |
| Philippines (Davao Region) | Davao | Francisco Bangoy International Airport | Terminated | |
| Philippines (Eastern Visayas) | Tacloban | Daniel Z. Romualdez Airport | | |
| Philippines (Mimaropa) | Puerto Princesa | Puerto Princesa International Airport | Terminated | |
| Philippines (National Capital Region) | Manila | Ninoy Aquino International Airport | Base | |
| Philippines (Northern Mindanao) | Cagayan de Oro | Laguindingan Airport | | |
| Philippines (Soccsksargen) | General Santos | General Santos International Airport | Terminated | |
| Philippines (Western Visayas) | Bacolod | Bacolod–Silay Airport | | |
| Philippines (Western Visayas) | Caticlan | Godofredo P. Ramos Airport | | |
| Philippines (Western Visayas) | Iloilo | Iloilo International Airport | | |
| Philippines (Western Visayas) | Kalibo | Kalibo International Airport | | |
| Philippines (Western Visayas) | Roxas | Roxas Airport | Terminated | |
| Philippines (Zamboanga Peninsula) | Zamboanga | Zamboanga International Airport | Terminated | |
| Singapore | Singapore | Changi Airport | Terminated | |
| South Korea | Busan | Gimhae International Airport | Terminated | |
| South Korea | Seoul | Incheon International Airport | | |
| Taiwan | Kaohsiung | Kaohsiung International Airport | | |
| Taiwan | Taipei | Taoyuan International Airport | | |
| Thailand | Bangkok | Don Mueang International Airport | | |
| Vietnam | Da Nang | Da Nang International Airport | | |
| Vietnam | Hanoi | Noi Bai International Airport | | |
| Vietnam | Ho Chi Minh City | Tan Son Nhat International Airport | Terminated | |

== Fleet ==
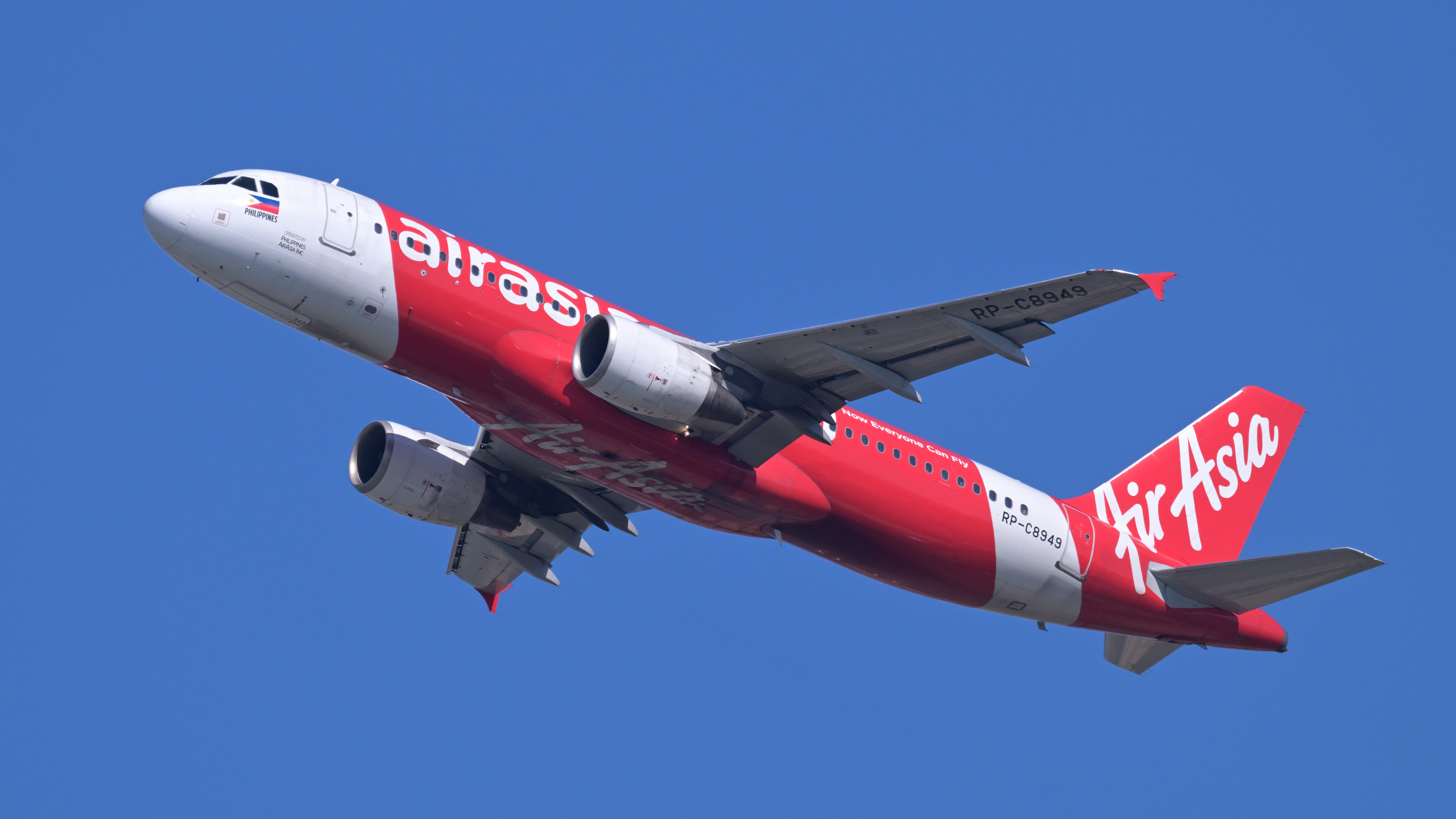
An Airbus A320-200

As of October 2026, Philippines AirAsia operates the following aircraft:

Philippines AirAsia fleet
| Aircraft | In service | Orders | Passengers | Notes |
|---|---|---|---|---|
| Airbus A220-300 | — | TBA | 160 | Deliveries to commence around 2027 or 2028. |
| Airbus A320-200 | 24 | — | 180 | 10 aircraft stored. |
| Airbus A321neo | — | 4 | 236 | Deliveries to commence soon. |
| Total | 15 | 4 | | |

== Sports teams ==
- AirAsia Philippine Patriots (ASEAN Basketball League, 2010–2012)
- AirAsia Flying Spikers (Philippine Super Liga, 2014)

== See also ==
- List of airlines of the Philippines
- List of airports in the Philippines
- List of companies of the Philippines
- List of low-cost airlines
- Transportation in the Philippines
