= Kalibo International Airport =

Airport serving Aklan, Philippines

Kalibo International Airport Paeoparang Pangkalibutan it Kalibo Pangkalibutan nga Hulugpaan sang Kalibo Paliparang Pandaigdig ng Kalibo
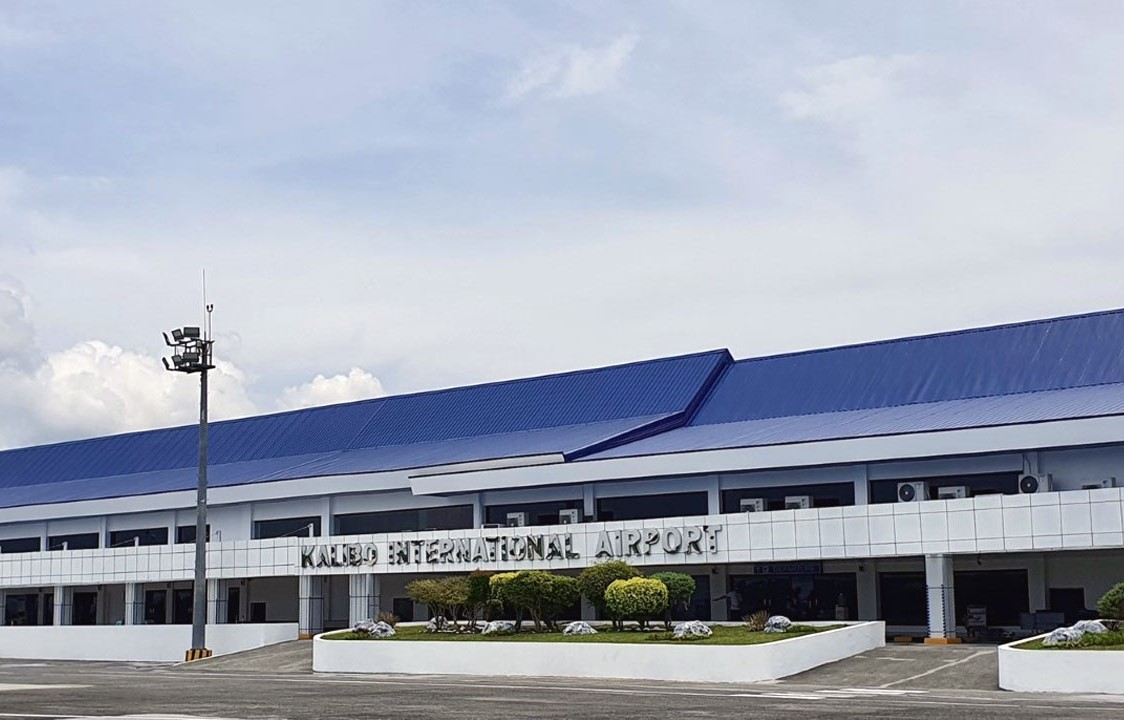
- IATA: KLO; ICAO: RPVK

Summary
- Airport type: Public
- Owner/Operator: Civil Aviation Authority of the Philippines
- Serves: Boracay (Note: The airport also serves as the main international gateway to Boracay, while Godofredo P. Ramos Airport in Malay serves as the main domestic gateway.)
- Location: Kalibo, Aklan
- Focus city for: Royal Air Philippines
- Time zone: PHT (UTC+08:00)
- Elevation AMSL: 4 m (13 ft)
- Coordinates: 11°40′45″N 122°22′33″E

Map
- Location within Visayas Location within Philippines

Runways
Direction	Length		Surface
Direction	m	ft	Surface
05/23 (Note: Runway 05 is 2,500 meters (8,200 ft) long with a displaced threshold of 60 meters (200 ft).)	2,560	8,399	Asphalt/concrete

Statistics (2022)
- Passengers: 628,803 ▲558.15%
- Aircraft movements: 4,496 ▲173.15%
- Cargo movement (in kg): 1,098,684 ▲36.41%
- Source: CAAP

Kalibo International Airport (IATA: KLO, ICAO: RPVK) is an international airport that serves the general area of Kalibo, the capital of the province of Aklan in the Philippines, and is one of two airports serving Boracay, the other being Godofredo P. Ramos Airport (also known as Caticlan Airport) in the municipality of Malay. It is situated 2 kilometers (1.2 mi) east of the town proper of Kalibo and 68 kilometers (42 mi) southeast from Caticlan Port in Malay. It is one of the two classified international airports on the island of Panay, alongside Iloilo International Airport, and is among the busiest airports in Western Visayas.

The airport is the fastest growing airport in the Philippines in terms of passenger traffic with more than 50% growth in 2010, and 2nd fastest for seats offered for June 2014 over the corresponding month of the previous year (20%). The airport is classified as an international airport by the Civil Aviation Authority of the Philippines, a body of the Department of Transportation responsible for the operations of all airports in the Philippines except major international airports.

== Expansion and development ==
On March 31, 2008, construction of the airport's new terminal building commenced. The said construction is part of the ₱130-million fund pledged by President Gloria Macapagal Arroyo in 2007 for the upgrade of the airport which is being geared to become an international landmark for tourism. The package includes 80 million pesos for the new terminal, while ₱50 million was released in 2009 by the Department of Budget and Management for the installation of an Instrument Landing System (ILS).

The Kalibo International Airport has among the highest international flight activity in Western Visayas. Regular and chartered flights accommodate thousands of travelers during the holidays from Asian routes to the capital town of Kalibo.

A 200-meter (660 ft) extension of the runway was due to open by the end of 2017, which would extend the current 2,187-meter (7,175 ft) runway to 2,387 meters (7,831 ft). The construction of the new terminal building is to start as soon as possible. There is also to be widening and extension of the apron and expansion of the tarmac, plus additional aircraft parking, airport lights and vehicular parking.

A ₱17.9-million expansion and rehabilitation project for the terminal building begun on July 2, 2018 as part of the Build! Build! Build! program of the government that has been pushing for the development and expansion of existing infrastructures such as airports. Rehabilition works were completed on September 15, 2020. The entire rehabilitation project, which included the rehabilitation of the terminal, reblocking of apron pavement and upgrades to the nearby facilities, was inaugurated on June 4, 2021.

== Structure ==
=== Runway ===
The airport has a single 2,500-meter (8,200 ft) runway with a width of 45 meters (148 ft), running in a direction of 05°/23°. It can accommodate narrow-body aircraft such as the Airbus A320 family and Airbus A321.

=== Passenger terminal ===
The airport has a two-level passenger terminal building. The first level houses the check-in counters, security checks, and the pre-departure area. The second level houses the airline offices in the check-in area, and various kiosks. The pre-departure area also has restaurants and pasalubong centers.

The international passenger terminal building has an area of 2,633.40 square meters (28,345.7 sq ft) and can accommodate 406 passengers.

=== Air traffic control tower ===
The air traffic control (ATC) tower of Kalibo International Airport has a height of 30 feet, which is the minimum airport tower height in the Philippines.

== Airlines and destinations ==
Airlines	Destinations
Cebu Pacific	Manila
IrAero	Seasonal: Irkutsk (Note: IrAero flights make an intermediate stop in Hefei en route to the listed destination. However, the airline has no fifth freedom rights to carry passengers solely between Kalibo and Hefei.)
Philippine Airlines	Seasonal: Seoul–Incheon
Philippines AirAsia	Manila
Trinity Airways	Seoul–Incheon

== Statistics ==
Data from Civil Aviation Authority of the Philippines (CAAP).

Year	Passenger movements				Aircraft movements				Cargo movements (in kg)			
Year	Domestic	International	Total	% change	Domestic	International	Total	% change	Domestic	International	Total	% change
2001	238,123	0	238,123	Steady	5,628	0	5,628	Steady	1,742,440	0	1,742,440	Steady
2002	253,563	0	253,563	▲6.48	5,358	0	5,358	▼4.80	2,040,554	0	2,040,554	▲17.11
2003	229,850	0	229,850	▼9.35	3,142	0	3,142	▼41.36	1,867,789	0	1,867,789	▼8.47
2004	246,355	0	246,355	▲7.18	5,750	0	5,750	▲83.00	1,518,474	0	1,518,474	▼18.70
2005	242,183	0	242,183	▼1.69	3,148	0	3,148	▼45.25	1,642,403	0	1,642,403	▲8.16
2006	343,346	0	343,346	▲41.77	3,918	0	3,918	▲24.46	1,674,593	0	1,674,593	▲1.96
2007	470,169	0	470,169	▲36.94	4,300	0	4,300	▲9.75	1,931,145	0	1,931,145	▲15.32
2008	400,042	0	400,042	▼14.91	4,634	0	4,634	▲7.76	1,508,760	0	1,508,760	▼21.87
2009	623,227	26,570	649,797	▲62.43	8,590	320	8,910	▲92.27	1,809,744	—	1,809,744	▲19.95
2010	845,114	203,174	1,005,845	▲54.79	12,864	1,640	14,504	▲62.78	1,697,837	78,514	1,776,351	▼1.84
2011	887,730	490,805	1,378,535	▲37.05	11,518	4,094	15,612	▲7.64	1,779,345	126,468	1,905,813	▲7.29
2012	1,116,006	716,162	1,832,168	▲32.90	12,326	6,020	18,346	▲17.51	1,701,715	48,864	1,750,579	▼8.14
2013	1,517,949	737,594	2,255,543	▲18.77	12,400	6,100	18,500	▲0.35	1,672,316	983	1,673,299	▼4.41
2014	1,490,685	830,477	2,321,162	▲9.72	12,110	6,998	19,108	▲3.19	1,670,874	—	1,670,874	▲0.14
2015	1,390,635	987,512	2,378,147	▲2.40	12,812	7,764	20,576	▲7.13	1,706,549	—	1,706,549	▲2.09
2016	1,395,004	1,316,032	2,711,036	▲12.28	11,656	9,306	20,962	▲1.84	1,750,000	—	1,750,000	▲2.48
2017	1,093,564	1,426,604	2,520,168	▼7.04	11,652	10,209	21,861	▲4.28	3,711,843	—	3,711,843	▲112.10
2018	595,378	826,126	1,421,504	▼43.59	5,734	6,111	11,845	▼45.82	3,528,220	—	3,528,220	▼4.9
2019	841,591	1,750,560	2,592,151	▲82.35	8,016	12,362	20,378	▲72.04	6,345,618	—	6,345,618	▲79.85
2020	154,033	237,396	391,429	▼84.90	1,945	1,895	3,840	▼81.16	552,462	—	552,462	▼91.29
2021	95,541	0	95,541	▼75.59	1,645	1	1,646	▼0.56	805,433	0	805,433	▲64.89
2022	530,564	98,239	628,803	▲558.15	3,856	640	4,496	▲173.15	1,098,684	—	1,098,684	▲36.41

An em dash (—) is used if data from CAAP is not available.

== Accidents and incidents ==
- On February 13, 2012, Airphil Express Flight 969, an Airbus A320-214 from Manila with 135 people on board, overshot the runway. No injuries or aircraft damage occurred in the incident.
- On December 19, 2013, Zest Air Flight 058, an Airbus A320-232 departing for Busan, skidded off the runway while doing a 180-degree turn at the runway. No injuries among the 144 passengers and crew were reported.
- On December 30, 2014, AirAsia Zest Flight 272, an Airbus A320-216 from Manila, overshot the runway during landing. All 159 passengers and crew survived with no injuries.
- On April 14, 2016, SEAir International Flight 3091, an Airbus A320-231 from Seoul (Incheon), blew one of its tires after touchdown. All 156 passengers and crew evacuated with no injuries.
- On March 13, 2019, Far Eastern Air Transport Flight 321, a McDonnell Douglas MD-83 (registered B-28027) from Taipei (Taoyuan), veered from the runway into muddy fields upon landing at Kalibo airport at 18:05 local Philippine time.
