= Sky Pasada =

Airline of the Philippines

IATA	ICAO	Call sign
SP	WCC	SKY PASADA
- Founded: February 19, 2010; 16 years ago
- AOC #: 2009015
- Operating bases: Ninoy Aquino International Airport
- Fleet size: 8
- Destinations: 8
- Parent company: WCC Aviation Company
- Headquarters: 960 Aurora Blvd., Cubao, Quezon City, Metro Manila 1109, Philippines
- Key people: Capt. Ramon V. Guico III (Chairman & CEO)
- Website: www.skypasada.com

WCC Aviation, Inc., operating as Sky Pasada, is an airline based in Binalonan, Pangasinan, Philippines owned and operated by the Guico family. Founded in 2010, it primarily serves the northern Luzon provinces of Batanes, Cagayan and Isabela as well as Baguio City from its hub at Binalonan Airport.

== History ==
SkyPasada started in 2005 as the WCC Pilot Academy (now WCC Aeronautical and Technical College), an aviation school established by World Citi Colleges, which was an educational institution in Cubao, Quezon City founded by the Guico family of Binalonan, Pangasinan. In 2008, the aviation school began operating from a private airstrip that the family built in Binalonan.

On 19 February 2010, the Guico family founded SkyPasada and began offering charter flights to various destinations in Northern Luzon after it signed a memorandum of understanding with the provincial governments of Batanes, Cagayan and Isabela to launch the Northern Luzon Aeronautical Highway. The aeronautical highway was a project of Philippine President Gloria Macapagal-Arroyo, who is a cousin of the company's founder.

Its initial routes included flights from Tuguegarao to Maconacon, Isabela and Basco, Batanes, flights from Cauayan, Isabela to Maconancon and Palanan, Isabela, as well as a flight from Laoag to Batanes. In June 2010, the company began offering flights to Baguio via Loakan Airport and Boracay via Caticlan Airport.

On 1 July 2010, the airline temporarily suspended operations after the Civil Aviation Authority of the Philippines ordered the company to repair its fleet of two Let L-410 Turbolet aircraft to conform to international standards. It resumed operations on 29 May 2011.

== Destinations ==
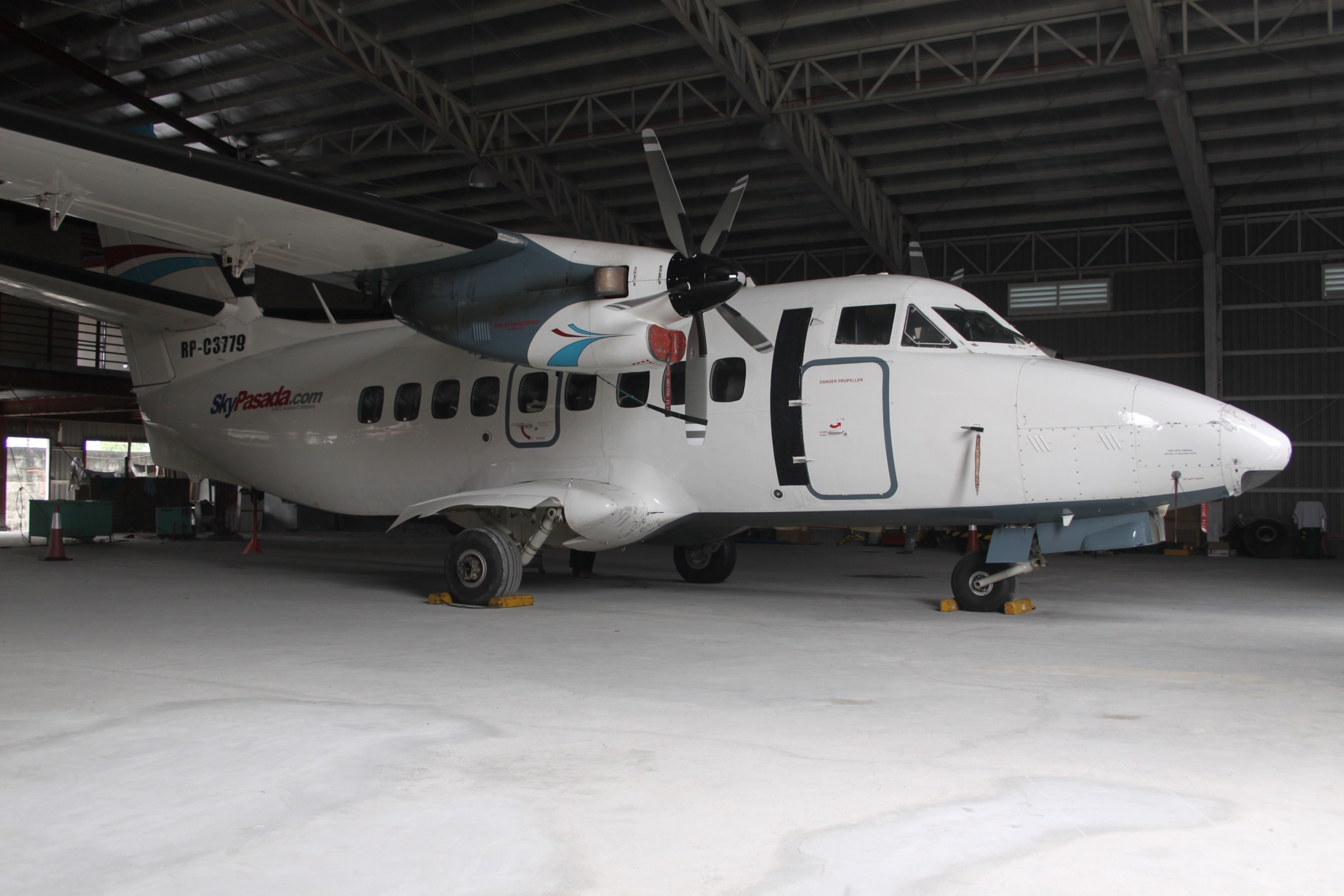
A Let L-410 UVP-E Turbolet operated by Sky Pasada in a hangar at Ninoy Aquino International Airport.

As of July 2024, Sky Pasada flies to the following domestic destinations:

- Basco - Basco Airport
- Binalonan - Binalonan Airfield
- Calayan - Calayan Airport
- Cauayan - Cauayan Airport
- Laoag - Laoag International Airport
- Maconacon - Maconacon Airport
- Palanan - Palanan Airport
- Tuguegarao - Tuguegarao Airport
- Baguio - Loakan Airport

== Incidents ==
- On 9 February 2012, Sky Pasada flight SP0633, a Let L-410 operating from Basco, Batanes to Itbayat, Batanes, overran the runway due to strong winds. As a result, the landing gear of the aircraft was destroyed.
