= Catarman National Airport =

Airport in Northern Samar, Philippines

Catarman National Airport Nasudnon nga Luparan san Catarman Paliparang Pambansa ng Catarman
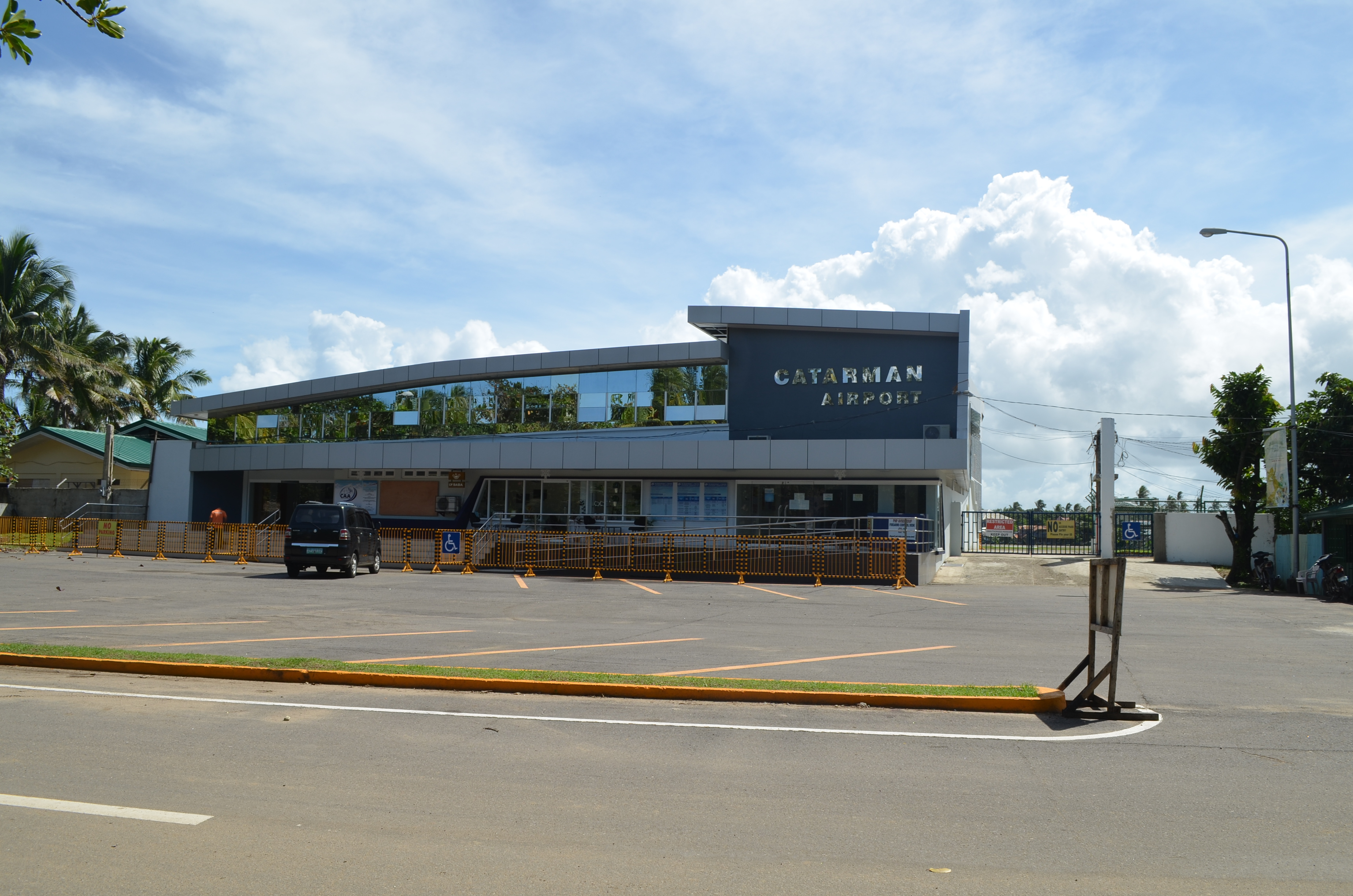
- Exterior of Catarman National Airport
- IATA: CRM; ICAO: RPVF

Summary
- Airport type: Public
- Owner/Operator: Civil Aviation Authority of the Philippines
- Serves: Catarman
- Elevation AMSL: 2 m / 6 ft
- Coordinates: 12°30′9″N 124°38′9″E

Map

Runways
Direction	Length		Surface
Direction	m	ft	Surface
04/22	1,600	5,249	Asphalt/Concrete

Statistics (2014)
- Passengers: 33,415
- Aircraft movements: 1,056
- Tonnes of cargo: 71.802
- Statistics of the Civil Aviation of the Philippines.

Catarman National Airport (IATA: CRM, ICAO: RPVF), otherwise known as Catarman Airport, is an airport serving the general area of Catarman, located in the province of Northern Samar in the Philippines. The airport is classified as a Class 2 principal (minor domestic) airport by the Civil Aviation Authority of the Philippines, a body of the Department of Transportation that is responsible for the operations of not only this airport but also of all other airports in the Philippines except the major international airports.

== Airport upgrade ==
Catarman National Airport is a priority for national appropriation by the Philippine government. Improvement of its terminal building incurred a budgetary allocation of a 15 million-peso appropriation from the national government.

The airport sustained heavy damage following the onslaught of Typhoon Nona in 2015. Rehabilitation works were started and the project consists of constructing a new passenger terminal building, taxiway, perimeter fence, expanding the apron, and improvements in the runway. The upgrade works at the airport were completed in August 2021 and were inaugurated on September 2, 2021.

== Airport facilities ==
=== Terminal building ===
Prior to the upgrade, the passenger terminal building had a capacity of 50 passengers. After the upgrade, the capacity was increased to 150 passengers and can now accommodate 50,000 passengers annually.

=== Runway ===
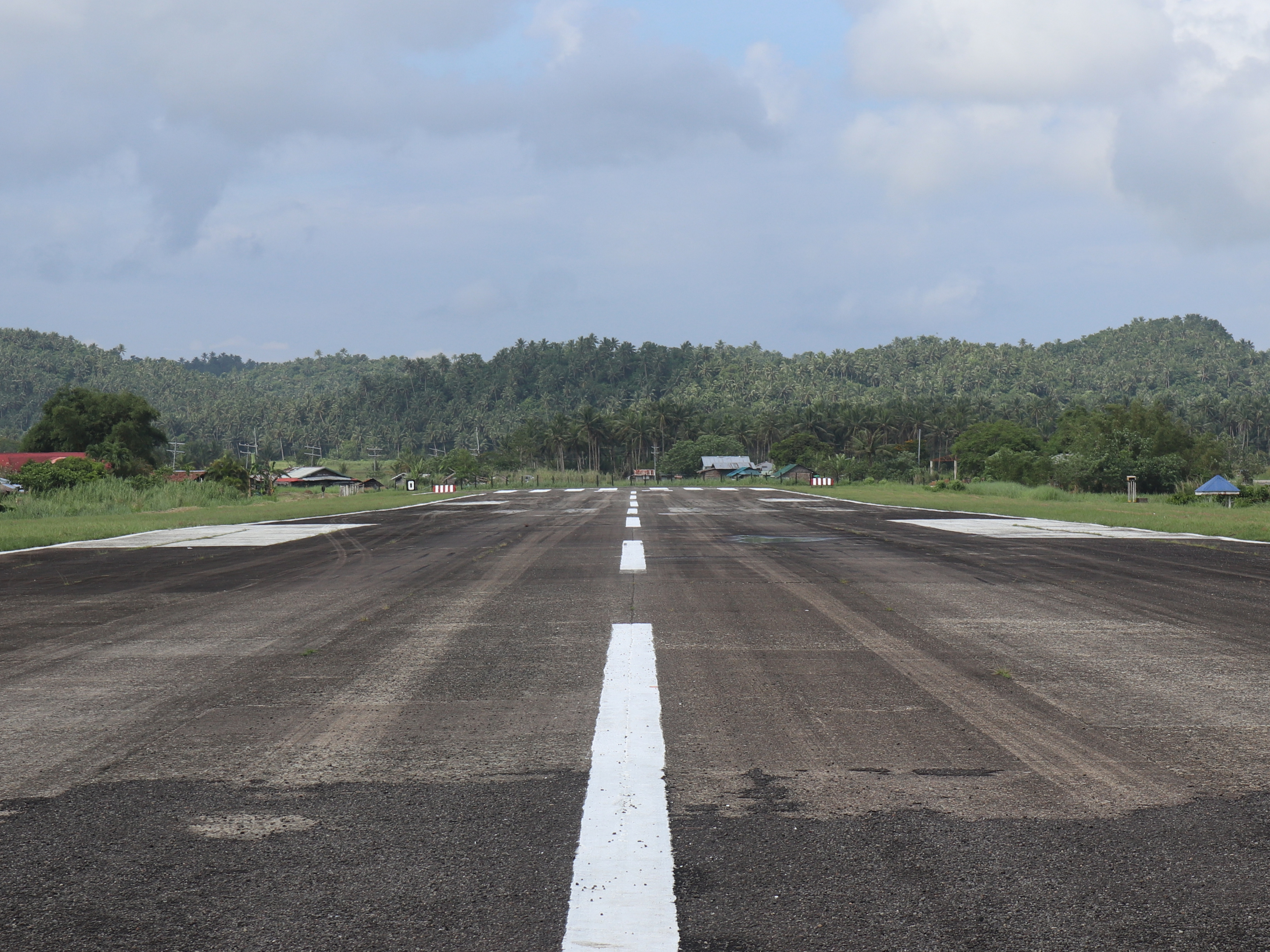
Runway

The airport has a 1,600-meter (5,200 ft) asphalt/concrete runway that runs in a 04/22 direction. During the upgrade, the runway was overlaid with asphalt.

=== Apron ===
The airport has two parking bays and can accommodate two De Havilland Canada Dash 8 (formerly Bombardier Q400) turboprops.

== Airlines and destinations ==
Airlines	Destinations
PAL Express	Cebu

== See also ==
- List of airports in the Philippines
