= Pacificair =

Charter airline based in the Philippines

IATA	ICAO	Call sign
3F	-	-
- Founded: 1947; 79 years ago
- Hubs: Ninoy Aquino International Airport
- Fleet size: 4
- Headquarters: Manila, Philippines
- Website: pacificair.com.ph

Pacific Airways Corporation operating as Pacificair is a charter airline based in Manila in the Philippines. It operates scheduled passenger flights, as well as air taxi services, and agricultural work. Its main base is Ninoy Aquino International Airport, Manila.

== History ==
The airline was established in 1947. However, its franchise to operate air services was approved by Congress of the Philippines on February 23, 1995, through Republic Act No. 7909.

== Incidents and accidents ==
On 2 April 1996, a de Havilland Canada DHC-6 Twin Otter 200 RP-C1154 taxied across Manila International Airport runway 13 at the Taxiway F1 intersection. At the same moment, a Boeing 737 (EI-BZF) was taking off and collided with the Twin Otter. The 737 carried the Twin Otter for 130 metres (430 ft) before coming to a halt. The aircraft was taxiing to the Pacific Airways hangar after passenger disembarkation at the General Aviation ramp.

On 9 June 1999, a Britten-Norman BN-2A-21 Islander RP-C471 crashed near Coron Airport and was written off. There was two crew fatality (pilot: Angelito V. Ruiz, SR. & Co-pilot J. Cristobal).

On 16 October 2004, a Britten-Norman BN-2A-21 Islander RP-C1325, bound from Coron Airport to Puerto Princesa Airport with 700 kilos of live fish, flew into the side of Mount Tagpao. Weather was poor with heavy rains. There were two crew fatalities. The aircraft was written off.

== Fleet ==
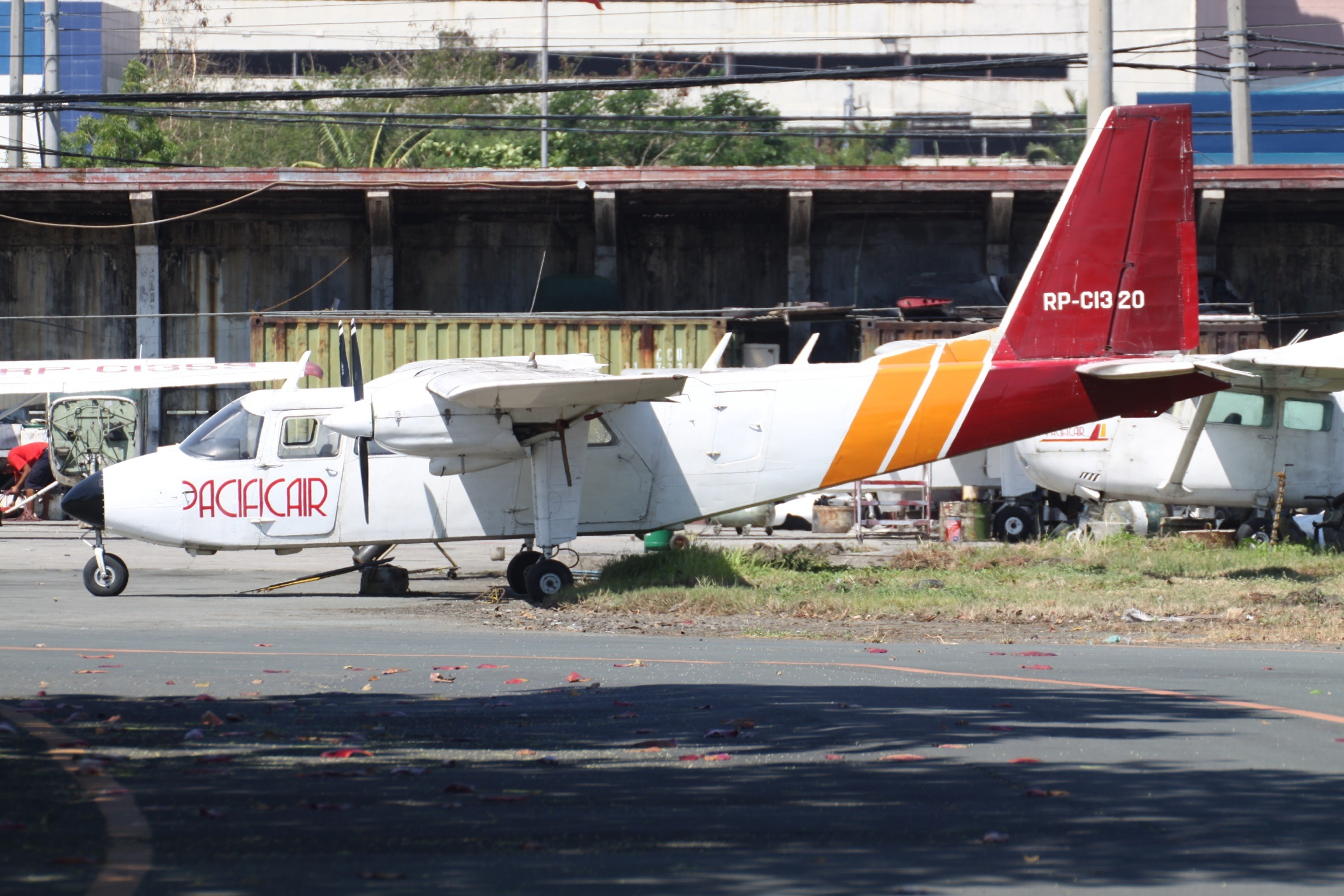
A Britten-Norman BN2A Islander parked at Ninoy Aquino International

The Pacificair fleet includes the following aircraft (at March 2007):

- 4 Britten-Norman BN2A Islander
