= Tuguegarao Airport =

Airport serving Tuguegarao, Cagayan, Philippines

Tuguegarao Airport Pagtayaban ti Tuguegarao Pakkayabban ya Tugegaraw Paliparan ng Tuguegarao
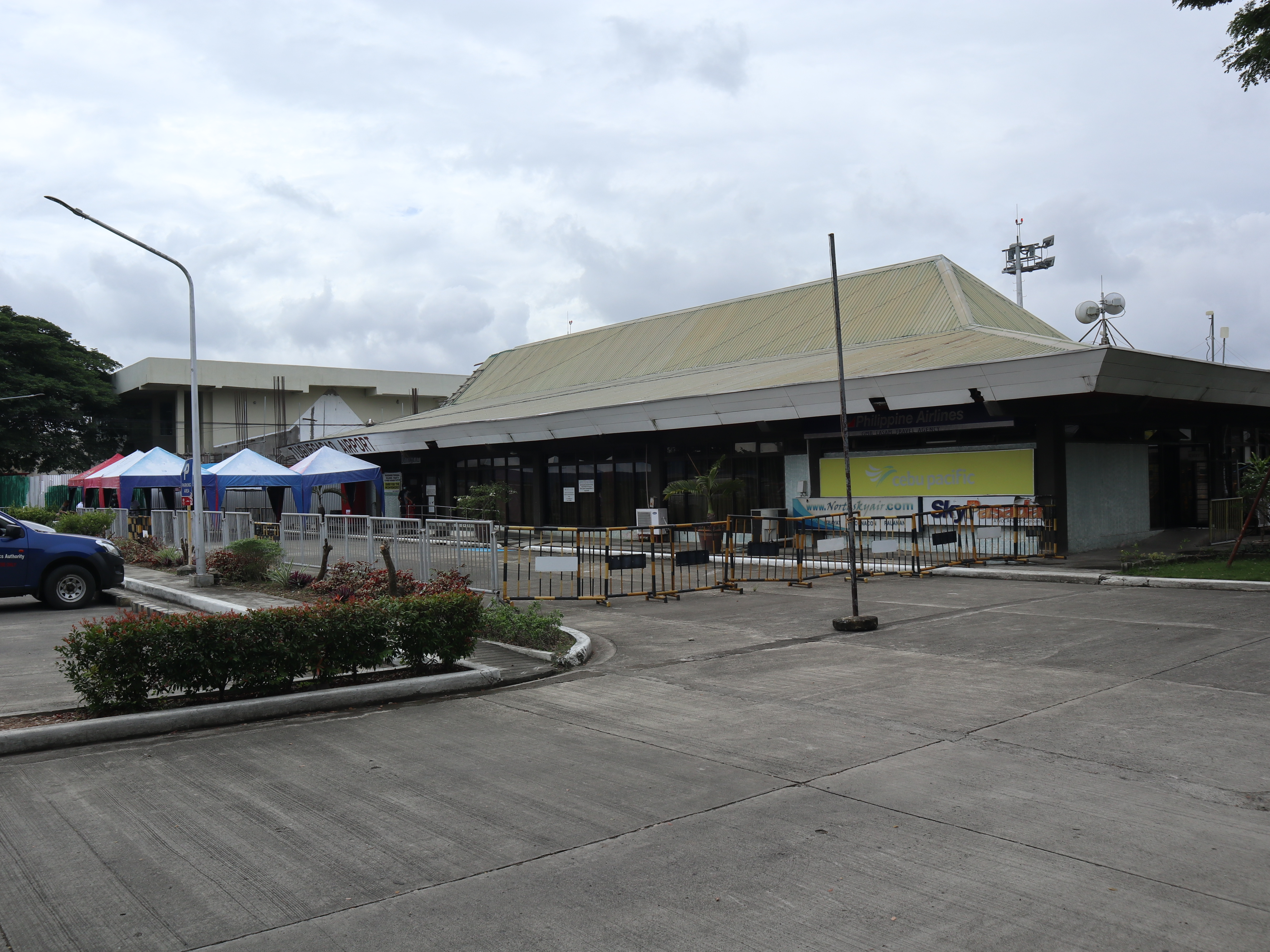
- Exterior of Tuguegarao Airport in 2022
- IATA: TUG; ICAO: RPUT; WMO: 98233

Summary
- Airport type: Public
- Owner/Operator: Civil Aviation Authority of the Philippines
- Serves: Tuguegarao
- Elevation AMSL: 21 m (69 ft)
- Coordinates: 17°38′18″N 121°43′50″E

Map
- Location within Luzon Location within Philippines

Runways
Direction	Length		Surface
Direction	m	ft	Surface
17/35	1,965	6,447	Concrete

Statistics (2023)
- Passengers (2023): 225,961 ▲52.8%
- Aircraft movements: 4,226
- Tonnes of cargo: 2,161.5
- Statistics from the Civil Aviation Authority of the Philippines.

Tuguegarao Airport (IATA: TUG, ICAO: RPUT) is an airport serving the general area of Tuguegarao, the capital city of the province of Cagayan in the Philippines. Located along Maharlika Highway, the airport is accessible from adjacent municipalities in Cagayan and northern Isabela. It is classified as a major commercial domestic airport by the Air Transportation Office.

The airport is currently served by Cebu Pacific, Sky Pasada, and Philippine Airlines with regular and charter flights to Manila, Calayan, Batanes, and Isabela. In 2023, Tuguegarao Airport recorded annual passenger traffic of 225,961, a 52.8% increase from the previous year.

== Airlines and destinations ==
Airlines	Destinations
Cebu Pacific	Manila
PAL Express	Manila

== Terminal and apron ==
View from the airport's apron of the passenger terminal building under renovation

The airport consists of a 1,100 square meter terminal with its second floor to be developed during its second phase of rehabilitation— and a 150-meter by 115-meter apron. In 2015, the Department of Transportation and Communications allotted ₱45.99 million for terminal upgrades and another ₱10.67 million for runway and taxiway widening.

On March 14, 2018, the rehabilitated and expanded Passenger Terminal Building was inaugurated by Transportation Secretary Arthur Tugade. When all the expansions and upgrades were completed, the airport is expected to cater more passenger and aircraft movement as well as safe nighttime operations.

== Expansion and development ==
In 2015, the Department of Transportation and Communications launched the expansion and modernization program of the Tuguegarao Airport, alongside several key secondary airports in the country. Named as the Tuguegarao Airport Development Project, which consist of ₱10.67 million for taxiway and runway widening and another ₱45.99 million for the terminal upgrades.

As of 2018, Phase 1 was completed which includes the expansion of the passenger terminal building, widening of runway and taxiway and the upgrading of the Airfield Lighting System, necessary for longer night time operations. Phase 2 of the Tuguegarao Airport Development Project, which starts in 2018, covers the expansion of the existing pre-departure and check-in areas of the passenger terminal building and additional check-in counters at the second floor.

The 2024 national budget has allocated ₱150.0 million for the airport's development in time for the projected full recovery of global air traffic in 2025. The airport's new air traffic control tower is currently under construction.

The expansion is expected to be completed on December 2026 which can accommodate more-than-triple its current passenger capacity.

== Statistics ==
=== Volume of passengers ===
Data of passenger movements is from the Civil Aviation Authority of the Philippines (CAAP).

Calendar Year	Passenger movement	% Change
2001	33,485	no data
2002	27,000 (Note: Data missing for July and October 2002.)	▼19.37%
2003	17,786 (Note: Data missing for May and August–November 2003.)	▼34.13%
2004	31,973 (Note: Data missing for May 2004.)	▲79.76%
2005	31,992 (Note: Data missing for December 2005.)	▲0.06%
2006	29,814	▼6.81%
2007	38,123	▲27.87%
2008	68,821	▲80.00%
2009	94,350	▲37.09%
2010	116,525	▲23.50%
2011	127,595	▲9.50%
2012	223,907	▲75.48%
2013	141,151	▼36.96%
2014	151,608	▲7.41%
2015	129,889	▼14.33%
2016	186,193	▲43.35%
2017	209,358	▲12.44%
2018	384,819	▲83.81%
2019	225,747	▼41.34%
2020	41,931	▼81.43%
2021	21,870	▼47.84%
2022	147,865	▲576.11%
2023	225,961	▲52.82%

== Accidents and incidents ==
- On August 1, 2023, a Cessna 152 plane registered as RP-C8598 crashed in Luna, Apayao, taking the lives of its two passengers. The plane, along with a similar aircraft, took off from Laoag at 12:16 PM but only one landed on Tuguegarao at 1:11 PM.

== See also ==
- List of airports in the Philippines
- Cagayan North International Airport
