= List of airports in the Philippines =

This is a list of airports in the Philippines, grouped by type.

== Classification ==
The Manila flight information region (RPHI FIR), which encompasses the entirety of the Philippines' airspace. International airports designated by the Civil Aviation Authority of the Philippines (CAAP) are marked in blue.

Regulation of airports and aviation in the Philippines lies with the Civil Aviation Authority of the Philippines (CAAP). The CAAP's classification system, introduced in 2008, rationalizes the previous Air Transportation Office (ATO) system of airport classification, pursuant to the Philippine Transport Strategic Study and the 1992 Civil Aviation Master Plan. The list is updated every three years, or as the need arises.

In the current classification system, 88 airports owned by the national government are placed into one of three main categories:

1. International airports are airports capable of handling international flights and have border control facilities. Airports in this category include airports that currently serve, or previously served, international destinations. There are currently 8 airports in this category. Seven of these airports were in the initial CAAP list in 2008: Clark, Davao, Laoag, Mactan–Cebu, Manila–Ninoy Aquino, Kalibo and Puerto Princesa. The only airport elevated to international status since 2008 has been the Iloilo Airport, where scheduled international service began in 2012.

Both the Bohol–Panglao International Airport in Bohol and the Bicol International Airport in Albay, while billed as international airports, have yet to be formally placed into this category as of February 2022, while the General Santos, Subic Bay and Zamboanga international airports, though still retaining their names, were subsequently downgraded by the CAAP.

2. Principal airports are airports which serve domestic destinations. There are 40 in total. This category is further subdivided into two types:

- Class 1 principal airports are airports capable of serving jet aircraft with a capacity of at least 100 seats (but could be 70). As of February 2022 there are 21 airports under this sub-category, all of which have regularly scheduled air service. Both new "international" airports built and opened after the Iloilo International Airport (Bohol–Panglao and Bicol), as well as the international airports since downgraded by the CAAP, are officially classified under this sub-category, while four airports were upgraded: Godofredo P. Ramos Airport in Aklan and Sanga-Sanga Airport in Tawi-Tawi, formerly Class 2 principal airports, and the Cauayan and Ozamiz airports, formerly community airports.
- Class 2 principal airports are airports capable of serving propeller aircraft with a capacity of at least 19 seats. There are 19 airports under this sub-category, most of which have regularly scheduled air service. In February 2022, the CAAP classified the previously unclassified San Vicente and Manila–Sangley Point airports under this sub-category.

3. Community airports are airports that are used primarily for general aviation. There are currently 40 airports in this category. Only a few community airports, such as Siquijor Airport and Vigan Airport, have regularly scheduled air service. In February 2022, the CAAP classified the previously unclassified M'lang airport under this category.

All privately owned aerodromes (airports, airstrips, airfields) are outside of the CAAP's classification system.

=== Former ATO classification ===
The old ATO system, in use until 2008, categorized the country's public airports into four types:

1. International airports were airports capable of handling international flights. There were two sub-categories of international airports:

- Regular International airports were "used for the operation of aircraft engaged in international air navigation," and served as country's primary international gateways. In 2004, Manila and Mactan–Cebu were the only airports in this category. Clark and Subic Bay were later given this status.
- Alternate International airports were airports capable of handling international flights in lieu of the regular international airports, but were not designated as primary international gateways. The four airports of Davao, General Santos, Laoag and Zamboanga were classified as such.

2. Trunkline airports were airports serving the principal commercial centers of the Philippines, intended for use by medium-range jets. These were, in most cases, the only domestic airports equipped with instrument landing systems. Twelve airports were classified under this category in 2004. Prior to their closure or conversion to military use, the former domestic airports of Bacolod, Cagayan de Oro and Iloilo were considered trunkline airports.

3. Secondary airports were airports serving smaller urban areas capable of at least handling smaller propeller aircraft, though some were capable of supporting jet aircraft. These airports were only open from sunrise until sunset, usually requiring notification of airport authorities if nighttime landing is a necessity. In 2004 a total of 25 facilities were considered secondary airports. Prior to its conversion to Rajah Buayan Air Base, Buayan Airport — the former commercial airport for General Santos — was classified as a secondary airport.

4. Feeder airports were airports capable of handling smaller piston aircraft. Many facilities in this category were small airstrips serving more remote areas. In 2004 a total of 42 facilities were considered feeder airports. Prior to their closure or transfer to private ownership, the airports of Dolores, Lucena and Malaybalay were under this classification.

ATO classification of airports, 2004
Airport	Category
Mactan–Cebu International Airport	Regular International
Manila (Ninoy Aquino) International Airport	Regular International
Davao (Francisco Bangoy) International Airport	Alternate International
General Santos (Tambler) Airport	Alternate International
Laoag International Airport	Alternate International
Zamboanga International Airport	Alternate International
Bacolod Airport	Trunkline
Baguio (Loakan) Airport	Trunkline
Butuan (Bancasi) Airport	Trunkline (Note: Classified as a secondary airport in 1997.)
Cagayan de Oro (Lumbia) Airport	Trunkline
Cotabato (Awang) Airport	Trunkline
Dumaguete (Sibulan) Airport	Trunkline
Iloilo (Mandurriao) Airport	Trunkline
Sulu (Jolo) Airport	Trunkline
Legazpi Airport	Trunkline
Puerto Princesa Airport	Trunkline (Note: Classified as an alternative international airport in 1997.)
Roxas Airport	Trunkline
San Jose Airport	Trunkline
Tacloban (Daniel Z. Romualdez) Airport	Trunkline
Basco Airport	Secondary
Bislig Airport	Secondary
Calbayog Airport	Secondary
Catarman Airport	Secondary
Cauayan Airport	Secondary
Daet (Bagasbas) Airport	Secondary
Dipolog Airport	Secondary
Iligan (Maria Cristina) Airport	Secondary
Kalibo Airport	Secondary
Mamburao Airport	Secondary
Marinduque Airport	Secondary
Masbate Airport	Secondary
Naga (Pili) Airport	Secondary
Ozamiz (Labo) Airport	Secondary
Pagadian Airport	Secondary
Plaridel Airport	Secondary
San Fernando (Poro Point) Airport	Secondary
Surigao Airport	Secondary
Tablas (Tugdan) Airport	Secondary
Tagbilaran Airport	Secondary
Tandag Airport	Secondary
Tawi-Tawi (Sanga-Sanga) Airport	Secondary
Tuguegarao Airport	Secondary
Alabat Airport	Feeder
Allah Valley Airport	Feeder
Antique (Evelio Javier) Airport	Feeder
Bagabag Airport	Feeder
Baler Airport	Feeder
Bantayan Airport	Feeder (Note: Classified as an alternative international airport in 1997.)
Biliran Airport	Feeder
Borongan (Punta Maria) Airport	Feeder
Bulan Airport	Feeder
Busuanga (Yulo King Ranch) Airport	Feeder
Cagayan de Sulu (Mapun) Airport	Feeder
Calapan Airport	Feeder
Camiguin (Mambajao) Airport	Feeder
Catbalogan Airport	Feeder
Caticlan (Godofredo P. Ramos) Airport	Feeder
Cuyo Airport	Feeder
Dolores Airport	Feeder
Guiuan Airport	Feeder
Hilongos Airport	Feeder
Iba Airport	Feeder
Ipil Airport	Feeder
Itbayat Airport	Feeder
Jomalig Airport	Feeder
Liloy Airport	Feeder
Lingayen Airport	Feeder
Lubang Airport	Feeder
Lucena Airport	Feeder
Maasin (Panan-awan) Airport	Feeder
Malabang Airport	Feeder
Malaybalay Airport	Feeder
Mati Airport	Feeder
Ormoc Airport	Feeder
Palanan Airport	Feeder
Pinamalayan Airport	Feeder
Rosales Airport	Feeder
Siargao (Sayak) Airport	Feeder
Siocon Airport	Feeder
Siquijor Airport	Feeder
Sorsogon (Bacon) Airport	Feeder
Ubay Airport	Feeder
Vigan (Mindoro) Airport	Feeder
Wasig (Mansalay) Airport	Feeder

This classification was made obsolete after the Air Transportation Office was replaced by the Civil Aviation Authority of the Philippines, the successor agency created by virtue of Republic Act No. 9497.

== List of CAAP-classified airports ==
The lists below follow the CAAP's classification for airports in the Philippines, as of February 2022. Airport names in bold have scheduled service on commercial airlines.

NOTE on ICAO codes: Under the current ICAO code assignment scheme, airports in the Luzon island group (including the Cuyo Islands, but excluding Masbate, Romblon and the rest of Palawan) and the Caluya Islands of Antique are assigned RPL- and RPU- codes; those in the Visayas (except Caluya), Masbate, Romblon and Palawan (except Cuyo), RPV- and RPS-; and those in Mindanao, RPM- and RPN-. Italicized are unofficial ICAO airport codes, i.e. those which do not fit the current code assignment scheme (RPEN, RPPN, RPTP), or are temporary placeholder codes containing numbers (RP12 through 17).

=== International airports ===
Airport name	ICAO	IATA	General area served	Actual location		Usage	Runway length	Coordinates
Airport name	ICAO	IATA	General area served	City and province	Island group	Usage	Runway length	Coordinates
Clark International Airport	RPLC	CRK	Greater Manila Area	Mabalacat, Pampanga	Luzon	Civilian/military	3,200 m (10,500 ft)	15°11′09″N 120°33′35″E
Francisco Bangoy International Airport	RPMD	DVO	Davao Region	Davao City	Mindanao	Civilian	3,000 m (9,800 ft)	07°07′31″N 125°38′45″E
Iloilo International Airport	RPVI	ILO	Western Visayas	Cabatuan, Iloilo	Visayas	Civilian	2,500 m (8,200 ft)	10°49′58″N 122°29′36″E
Kalibo International Airport	RPVK	KLO	Western Visayas	Kalibo, Aklan	Visayas	Civilian	2,500 m (8,200 ft)	11°40′45″N 122°22′33″E
Laoag International Airport	RPLI	LAO	Ilocos Region	Laoag, Ilocos Norte	Luzon	Civilian	2,780 m (9,120 ft)	18°10′41″N 120°31′55″E
Mactan–Cebu International Airport	RPVM	CEB	Central Visayas	Lapu-Lapu City	Visayas	Civilian/military	3,310 m (10,860 ft); 2,560 m (8,400 ft)	10°18′26″N 123°58′44″E
Ninoy Aquino International Airport	RPLL	MNL	Greater Manila Area	Pasay / Parañaque	Luzon	Civilian/military	3,737 m (12,260 ft); 2,258 m (7,408 ft)	14°30′30″N 121°01′11″E
Puerto Princesa International Airport	RPVP	PPS	Palawan	Puerto Princesa	Luzon	Civilian/military	2,600 m (8,500 ft)	09°44′31″N 118°45′32″E

=== Principal domestic airports ===
Airport name	ICAO	IATA	Actual location			Classification	Coordinates
Airport name	ICAO	IATA	City / Municipality	Province	Island Group	Classification	Coordinates
**Bacolod–Silay Airport**	RPVB	BCD	Silay	Negros Occidental	Visayas	Principal-Class 1	10°46′35″N 123°00′55″E
**Bicol International Airport**	RPLK	DRP	Daraga	Albay	Luzon	Principal-Class 1	13°06′44″N 123°40′38″E
**Bohol–Panglao International Airport** (New Bohol International Airport)	RPSP	TAG	Panglao	Bohol	Visayas	Principal-Class 1	09°33′52″N 123°45′57″E
**Bancasi Airport** (Butuan Airport)	RPME	BXU	Butuan	Agusan del Norte	Mindanao	Principal-Class 1	08°57′04″N 125°28′40″E
**Cauayan Airport**	RPUY	CYZ	Cauayan	Isabela	Luzon	Principal-Class 1	16°55′47″N 121°45′11″E
**Cotabato Airport** (Awang Airport)	RPMC	CBO	Datu Odin Sinsuat	Maguindanao del Norte	Mindanao	Principal-Class 1	07°09′54″N 124°12′34″E
**Daniel Z. Romualdez Airport** (Tacloban City Airport)	RPVA	TAC	Tacloban	Leyte	Visayas	Principal-Class 1	11°13′39″N 125°01′40″E
**Dipolog Airport**	RPMG	DPL	Dipolog	Zamboanga del Norte	Mindanao	Principal-Class 1	08°36′06″N 123°20′33″E
**Dumaguete–Sibulan Airport**	RPVD	DGT	Sibulan	Negros Oriental	Visayas	Principal-Class 1	09°20′01″N 123°18′02″E
**General Santos International Airport** (General Santos City Airport / Tambler Airport)	RPMR	GES	General Santos	South Cotabato	Mindanao	Principal-Class 1	06°03′28″N 125°05′45″E
**Godofredo P. Ramos Airport** (Boracay Airport / Caticlan Airport)	RPVE	MPH	Malay / Nabas	Aklan	Visayas	Principal-Class 1	11°55′29″N 121°57′18″E
**Labo Airport** (Ozamiz Airport)	RPMO	OZC	Ozamiz	Misamis Occidental	Mindanao	Principal-Class 1	08°10′43″N 123°50′29″E
**Laguindingan International Airport**	RPMY	CGY	Laguindingan	Misamis Oriental	Mindanao	Principal-Class 1	08°36′43″N 124°27′21″E
**Naga Airport**	RPUN	WNP	Pili	Camarines Sur	Luzon	Principal-Class 1	13°35′05″N 123°16′12″E
**Pagadian Airport**	RPMP	PAG	Pagadian	Zamboanga del Sur	Mindanao	Principal-Class 1	07°49′38″N 123°27′30″E
**Roxas Airport**	RPVR	RXS	Roxas	Capiz	Visayas	Principal-Class 1	11°35′51″N 122°45′06″E
**Sanga-Sanga Airport** (Tawi-Tawi Airport)	RPMN	TWT	Bongao	Tawi-Tawi	Mindanao	Principal-Class 1	05°02′49″N 119°44′34″E
**San Jose Airport**	RPUH	SJI	San Jose	Occidental Mindoro	Luzon	Principal-Class 1	12°21′41″N 121°02′48″E
**Subic Bay International Airport**	RPLB	SFS	Morong	Bataan	Luzon	Principal-Class 1	14°47′39″N 120°16′15″E
**Tuguegarao Airport**	RPUT	TUG	Tuguegarao	Cagayan	Luzon	Principal-Class 1	17°38′18″N 121°43′50″E
**Zamboanga International Airport**	RPMZ	ZAM	Zamboanga City	—N/a	Mindanao	Principal-Class 1	06°55′20″N 122°03′35″E
**Basco Airport**	RPUO	BSO	Basco (Batan Island)	Batanes	Luzon	Principal-Class 2	20°27′05″N 121°58′47″E
**Calbayog Airport**	RPVC	CYP	Calbayog	Samar	Visayas	Principal-Class 2	12°04′22″N 124°32′42″E
**Camiguin Airport**	RPMH	CGM	Mambajao	Camiguin	Mindanao	Principal-Class 2	09°15′12″N 124°42′25″E
**Catarman National Airport**	RPVF	CRM	Catarman	Northern Samar	Visayas	Principal-Class 2	12°30′09″N 124°38′09″E
**Cuyo Airport**	RPLO	CYU	Magsaysay (Cuyo Island)	Palawan	Luzon	Principal-Class 2	10°51′29″N 121°04′10″E
**Evelio B. Javier Airport** (Antique Airport / San Jose de Buenavista Airport)	RPVS	EUQ	San Jose de Buenavista	Antique	Visayas	Principal-Class 2	10°45′57″N 121°56′00″E
**Francisco B. Reyes Airport** (Busuanga Airport)	RPVV	USU	Coron (Busuanga Island)	Palawan	Luzon	Principal-Class 2	12°07′17″N 120°06′00″E
**Jolo Airport**	RPMJ	JOL	Jolo	Sulu	Mindanao	Principal-Class 2	06°03′13″N 121°00′40″E
**Loakan Airport**	RPUB	BAG	Baguio	Benguet	Luzon	Principal-Class 2	16°22′30″N 120°37′10″E
Marinduque Airport	RPUW	MRQ	Gasan	Marinduque	Luzon	Principal-Class 2	13°21′36″N 121°49′31″E
**Moises R. Espinosa Airport** (Masbate Airport)	RPVJ	MBT	Masbate City	Masbate	Luzon	Principal-Class 2	12°22′10″N 123°37′45″E
Ormoc Airport	RPVO	OMC	Ormoc	Leyte	Visayas	Principal-Class 2	11°03′22″N 124°33′56″E
Sangley Point Airport	RPLS	SGL	Cavite City	Cavite	Luzon	Principal-Class 2	14°29′29″N 120°53′38″E
San Vicente Airport	RPSV	SWL	San Vicente	Palawan	Luzon	Principal-Class 2	10°31′30″N 119°16′26″E
**Sayak Airport** (Siargao Airport)	RPNS	IAO	Del Carmen (Siargao Island)	Surigao del Norte	Mindanao	Principal-Class 2	09°51′33″N 126°00′55″E
**Surigao Airport**	RPMS	SUG	Surigao City	Surigao del Norte	Mindanao	Principal-Class 2	09°45′28″N 125°28′51″E
Tandag Airport	RPMW	TDG	Tandag	Surigao del Sur	Mindanao	Principal-Class 2	09°04′20″N 126°10′17″E
**Tugdan Airport**	RPVU	TBH	Alcantara (Tablas Island)	Romblon	Luzon	Principal-Class 2	12°18′39″N 122°04′46″E
**Virac Airport**	RPUV	VRC	Virac	Catanduanes	Luzon	Principal-Class 2	13°34′35″N 124°12′20″E

=== Community airports ===
Airport name	ICAO	IATA	City served	Province	Usage	Coordinates
Alabat Airport	RPLY		Alabat Island (Alabat, Perez, Quezon)	Quezon	Community	14°13′59″N 121°55′43″E
Allah Valley Airport	RPMA	AAV	Surallah	South Cotabato	Community	06°22′04″N 124°45′09″E
Bagabag Airport	RPUZ		Bagabag	Nueva Vizcaya	Community	16°37′09″N 121°15′08″E
Bagasbas Airport (Daet Airport)	RPUD	DTE	Daet	Camarines Norte	Community	14°07′46″N 122°58′50″E
**Bantayan Airport**	RPSB		Santa Fe (Bantayan Island)	Cebu	Community	11°09′43″N 123°47′06″E
Biliran Airport	RPVQ		Naval	Biliran	Community	11°30′55″N 124°25′47″E
Bislig Airport	RPMF	BPH	Bislig	Surigao del Sur	Community	08°11′44″N 126°19′17″E
**Borongan (Punta Maria) Airport**	RPVW	BPA	Borongan	Eastern Samar	Community	11°40′27″N 125°28′43″E
Bulan Airport	RPUU		Bulan	Sorsogon	Community	12°41′02″N 123°52′38″E
Cagayan de Sulu Airport (Mapun Airport)	RPMU	CDY	Mapun	Tawi-Tawi	Community	12°32′01″N 121°28′52″E
Calapan Airport	RPUK		Calapan	Oriental Mindoro	Community	13°25′23″N 121°12′06″E
Catbalogan Airport	RPVY		Catbalogan	Samar	Community	11°48′36″N 124°49′48″E
Central Mindanao Airport (North Cotabato Rural Airport)			M'lang	Cotabato	Community	06°54′43″N 124°55′28″E
Guiuan Airport	RPVG		Guiuan	Eastern Samar	Community	11°02′07″N 125°44′29″E
Hilongos Airport	RPVH		Hilongos	Leyte	Community	10°22′36″N 124°45′40″E
Iba Airport	RPUI		Iba	Zambales	Community	15°19′33″N 119°58′06″E
Ipil Airport	RPMV	IPE	Ipil	Zamboanga Sibugay	Community	07°47′10″N 122°36′04″E
**Jorge Abad (Itbayat) Airport**	RPLT		Itbayat	Batanes	Community	20°43′22″N 121°48′36″E
Jomalig Island Airport	RPLJ		Jomalig (Polillo Islands)	Quezon	Community	14°42′15″N 122°19′51″E
**Dr. Juan C. Angara Airport** (Baler Airport)	RPUR	BQA	San Luis	Aurora	Community	15°43′49″N 121°30′06″E
Liloy Airport	RPMX		Liloy	Zamboanga del Norte	Community	08°06′06″N 122°40′14″E
Lingayen Airport	RPUG		Lingayen	Pangasinan	Community	16°02′06″N 120°14′30″E
Lubang Airport	RPLU	LBX	Lubang (Lubang Island)	Occidental Mindoro	Community	13°51′21″N 120°06′21″E
Malabang Airport	RPMM	MLP	Malabang	Lanao del Sur	Community	07°37′02″N 124°03′27″E
Mamburao Airport	RPUM	MBO	Mamburao	Occidental Mindoro	Community	13°12′32″N 120°36′18″E
Maria Cristina Airport (Iligan Airport)	RPMI	IGN	Balo-i	Lanao del Norte	Community	08°07′50″N 124°12′53″E
Mati Airport	RPMQ	MXI	Mati	Davao Oriental	Community	06°56′58″N 126°16′22″E
**Palanan Airport**	RPLN		Palanan	Isabela	Community	17°03′56″N 122°25′39″E
Panan-awan Airport (Maasin Airport)	RPSM		Maasin	Southern Leyte	Community	10°11′13″N 124°47′00″E|-
Pinamalayan Airport	RPLA		Pinamalayan	Oriental Mindoro	Community	12°59′11″N 121°25′33″E
Plaridel Airport	RPUX		Plaridel	Bulacan	Community	14°53′26″N 120°51′10″E
Rosales Airport	RPLR		Rosales	Pangasinan	Community	15°53′06″N 120°36′16″E
San Fernando Airport	RPUS	SFE	San Fernando	La Union	Community	16°35′41″N 120°18′13″E
Siocon Airport	RPNO	XSO	Siocon	Zamboanga del Norte	Community	07°42′35″N 122°09′44″E
**Siquijor Airport**	RPVZ	IQR	Siquijor	Siquijor	Community	09°12′38″N 123°28′09″E
Sorsogon (Gabao/Bacon) Airport	RPLZ		Sorsogon City	Sorsogon	Community	13°00′26″N 124°01′34″E
Ubay Airport	RPSN		Ubay	Bohol	Community	10°03′33″N 124°25′31″E
**Vigan Airport**	RPUQ		Vigan	Ilocos Sur	Community	17°33′17″N 120°21′22″E
Wao Airport			Wao	Lanao del Sur	Community	07°38′05″N 124°44′01″E
Wasig (Mansalay) Airport (possibly defunct)	RPLG		Mansalay	Oriental Mindoro	Community	12°32′1.5″N 121°28′55″E

== Unclassified aerodromes ==
The various civilian aerodromes listed in this section remain unclassified. These airports, airfields, airstrips and seaplane terminals are owned and operated by individuals, corporations, or local governments.

Many of these aerodromes were purposely built to service the surrounding area's dominant industry; such are located close to tourist areas, agricultural plantations, mines and logging concessions. Some small airstrips, such as those in Sagpangan, Limasawa and Dibagat, were built to facilitate missionary work in remote areas.

Not all of the listed aerodromes in this section necessarily have a valid aerodrome certificate from the CAAP. Many are non-operational, abandoned, inactive or already closed. Aerodromes which appear in the latest satellite imagery to no longer be usable due to redevelopment are marked with a ~~strikethrough~~. Airport codes that are now obsolete are enclosed in brackets.

Only a few of the aerodromes below see some amount of chartered or regularly scheduled cargo and/or commercial air traffic, usually with the use of smaller aircraft.

Airport name	ICAO	IATA	Actual location	Province	Primary related industry	Coordinates
~~Acoje Airstrip~~			Candelaria	Zambales	~~Mining~~	15°41′24″N 120°03′09″E
Air Juan Boracay Seaplane Terminal			Malay (Boracay Island)	Aklan	Tourism	11°58′28″N 121°54′46″E
Air Juan Cebu South Road Properties Seaplane Terminal			Cebu City	—	Tourism	10°15′55″N 123°52′41″E
Air Juan Manila Harbor Seaplane Terminal			Manila	—	Tourism	14°33′24″N 120°58′46″E
Air Juan Puerto Galera Seaplane Terminal			Puerto Galera	Oriental Mindoro	Tourism	13°30′34″N 120°56′50″E
Alto Airfield			Tarlac City	Tarlac	Agriculture/industry	15°25′30″N 120°37′50″E
Amoroy Airstrip			Aroroy	Masbate	Mining	12°30′08″N 123°22′29″E
~~Anahao Airstrip~~			General MacArthur	Eastern Samar	~~General aviation~~	11°15′04″N 125°33′15″E
Aparri (Maura) Airport	~~RPUA~~		Aparri	Cagayan	General aviation	18°21′17″N 121°39′12″E
Apuao Grande Airstrip			Mercedes (Apuao Grande Island)	Camarines Norte	General aviation	14°05′06″N 123°05′31″E
Apurawan Airstrip			Aborlan	Palawan	General aviation	09°35′51″N 118°20′18″E
Aras-Asan Airstrip			Cagwait	Surigao del Sur	Forestry	08°54′27″N 126°18′01″E
Asturias Airstrip			Asturias	Cebu	Agriculture	10°32′29″N 123°44′42″E
Azagra Airstrip			San Fernando (Sibuyan Island)	Romblon	General aviation	12°16′54″N 122°37′22″E
Bacuyangan Airstrip			Hinoba-an	Negros Occidental	Forestry	09°38′01″N 122°27′34″E
~~Bad-as Airfield~~			Placer	Surigao del Norte	~~General aviation~~	09°37′59″N 125°33′23″E
~~Baganga (Lambajon) Airport~~		BNQ	Baganga	Davao Oriental	~~Forestry~~	07°36′44″N 126°34′07″E
Balabagan Airstrip			Balabagan	Lanao del Sur	Agriculture	07°30′49″N 124°07′17″E
~~Balayan Airfield~~			Balayan	Batangas	~~General aviation~~	13°56′54″N 120°44′08″E
Balesin (E.L. Tordesillas) Airport	RPLE	BSI	Polillo (Balesin Island)	Quezon	Tourism	14°25′07″N 122°02′21″E
Barit Airstrip			Aparri (Barit Island)	Cagayan	Tourism	18°52′11″N 121°15′23″E
Barlo Airstrip			Dasol	Pangasinan	Mining	15°59′37″N 119°55′19″E
~~Barobo Airport~~			Barobo	Surigao del Sur	~~General aviation~~	08°31′58″N 126°04′07″E
Barradas Airstrip			Tanauan	Batangas	General aviation	14°05′49″N 121°06′58″E
Basay Airstrip			Basay	Negros Oriental	Mining	09°28′16″N 122°39′55″E
Batag Airstrip			Laoang (Batag Island)	Northern Samar	General aviation	12°37′00″N 125°03′04″E
Bato Airstrip			Taytay	Palawan	General aviation	10°42′22″N 119°29′18″E
Berong Airstrip			Quezon	Palawan	Mining	09°28′38″N 118°12′37″E
Bicobian Bay Airstrip			Divilacan	Isabela	Tourism/industry	17°16′17″N 122°25′45″E
Binalonan Airport			Binalonan	Pangasinan	General aviation	16°03′01″N 120°34′56″E
Brooke's Point Airstrip			Brooke's Point	Palawan	Agriculture	08°48′26″N 117°50′58″E
~~Buenavista Airfield~~	~~RPWV~~		Buenavista	Agusan del Norte	~~General aviation~~	08°56′32″N 125°23′50″E
Bugsuk (Bonbon) Airport			Balabac (Bugsuk Island)	Palawan	Agriculture	08°13′29″N 117°19′25″E
Bundagul Airstrip			Mabalacat	Pampanga	Industry	15°14′26″N 120°35′56″E
Busuanga Bay Lodge Seaplane Terminal			Busuanga (Busuanga Island)	Palawan	Tourism	12°01′24″N 119°58′39″E
Cabaluyan Airstrip			Mangatarem	Pangasinan	Agriculture	15°41′24″N 120°19′49″E
Cagayan North International Airport	RPLH	LLC	Lal-lo	Cagayan	Tourism/industry/logistics	18°10′55″N 121°44′45″E
Cagayancillo Airport (Magsaysay Airport)			Cagayancillo	Palawan	Tourism/general aviation	09°34′10″N 121°11′11″E
~~Calamba Airfield~~ (Canlubang Airstrip)			Canlubang, Calamba	Laguna	Industry/agriculture	14°11′31″N 121°4′16″E
Calanay Airstrip			Aroroy	Masbate	Agriculture	12°27′44″N 123°17′02″E
Calatagan (Hacienda Zobel) Airstrip			Calatagan	Batangas	Agriculture	13°50′36″N 120°38′01″E
Camotes Airstrip			San Francisco (Pacijan Island)	Cebu	General aviation	10°39′22″N 124°22′14″E
Candaraman Airstrip			Balabac (Candaraman Island)	Palawan	General aviation	08°04′35″N 117°06′30″E
Caranoche Airstrip			Santa Catalina	Negros Oriental	Agriculture	09°21′07″N 122°50′53″E
~~Carranglan Airstrip~~			Carranglan	Nueva Ecija	~~General aviation~~	15°58′53″N 121°02′23″E
Casiguran (Aurora Special Economic Zone) Airport		CGG	Casiguran	Aurora	Tourism/industry/logistics (formerly: forestry)	16°11′38″N 122°03′52″E
~~Catanauan Airstrip~~			Catanauan	Quezon	~~General aviation~~	13°35′18″N 122°16′45″E
Cesar Lim Rodriguez Airport (Taytay-Sandoval Airport)	RPSD	RZP	Taytay	Palawan	Tourism/general aviation	11°03′06″N 119°31′06″E
~~Cogonan Airstrip~~			New Bataan	Davao de Oro	~~Agriculture~~	07°35′21″N 126°06′38″E
Consuelo Airstrip 1			New Bataan	Davao de Oro	Agriculture	07°38′36″N 126°05′40″E
Consuelo Airstrip 2			New Bataan	Davao de Oro	Agriculture	07°38′00″N 126°05′19″E
Coron Rural Airport		XCN	Coron (Busuanga Island)	Palawan	Tourism/general aviation	12°00′42″N 120°12′02″E
Culion Airstrip		CUJ	Culion	Palawan	General aviation	11°51′16″N 119°56′15″E
Dacudao Airstrip			Davao City	—	Agriculture	07°13′43″N 125°27′26″E
~~Daja Airfield~~			Banga	Aklan	~~General aviation~~	11°33′50″N 122°18′29″E
Dalaguete (Casay) Airstrip			Dalaguete	Cebu	General aviation	09°49′18″N 123°32′53″E
~~Dansalan Airstrip~~			Marawi	Lanao del Sur	~~General aviation~~	08°00′36″N 124°16′42″E
Dapco Airstrip			Panabo	Davao del Norte	Agriculture	07°22′48″N 125°35′15″E
Datu Paglas Airstrip			Datu Paglas	Maguindanao del Sur	Agriculture	06°45′26″N 124°51′08″E
Del Monte Plantation Airstrip	RPMT		Manolo Fortich	Bukidnon	Agriculture	08°20′52″N 124°51′01″E
Del Pilar Airfield	RPVL		Roxas	Palawan	General aviation	10°20′07″N 119°21′16″E
Delta Airstrip			Kapalong	Davao del Norte	Agriculture	07°38′22″N 125°41′29″E
~~Diatagon Airstrip~~			Lianga	Surigao del Sur	~~Forestry~~	08°39′51″N 126°08′06″E
Digal Airstrip			Buluan	Maguindanao del Sur	Agriculture	06°44′17″N 124°49′36″E
Dibagat Airstrip			Kabugao	Apayao	General aviation	18°04′48″N 121°05′59″E
Dilasag Airstrip		DSG	Dilasag	Aurora	Forestry	08°39′51″N 126°08′06″E
Dinapigue Airstrip			Dinapigue	Isabela	Forestry	16°31′19″N 122°15′54″E
Divilacan Airstrip			Divilacan	Isabela	Forestry	17°19′58″N 122°17′58″E
Dizon Airstrip			Mawab	Davao de Oro	Agriculture	07°29′16″N 125°56′15″E
~~Dolores (Picardo) Airport~~ (defunct)	RPVX		Dolores	Eastern Samar	General aviation	12°02′16″N 125°29′25″E
Doña Flavia Airstrip			San Luis	Agusan del Sur	Forestry	08°28′06″N 125°42′38″E
Don Jesus Soriano (Doña Rosario) Airstrip			Tubay	Agusan del Norte	Agriculture	09°10′10″N 125°33′37″E
El Nido (Lio) Airport	RPEN	ENI	El Nido	Palawan	Tourism	11°12′08″N 119°24′59″E
Evergreen Farms Airstrip			Panabo	Davao del Norte	Agriculture	07°18′22″N 125°39′28″E
Farmington Airstrip			Santo Tomas	Davao del Norte	Agriculture	07°28′06″N 125°38′10″E
~~Ferrol (Odiongan) Airfield~~			Ferrol	Romblon	~~General aviation~~	12°20′42″N 121°56′14″E
Fuga Airstrip			Aparri (Fuga Island)	Cagayan	Tourism	18°51′46″N 121°17′01″E
General Emilio Aguinaldo (Sablayan) Airstrip			Sablayan	Occidental Mindoro	General aviation	12°49′03″N 120°52′53″E
Guianga Airstrip			Davao City	—	Agriculture	07°05′46″N 125°23′23″E
Guihing Airstrip			Hagonoy	Davao del Sur	Agriculture	06°41′41″N 125°21′39″E
Guimaras Airstrip			Buenavista	Guimaras	General aviation	10°41′40″N 122°39′56″E
Hermana Mayor Airstrip			Santa Cruz (Hermana Mayor Island)	Zambales	Tourism	15°46′55″N 119°47′34″E
Hermana Menor Airstrip			Santa Cruz (Hermana Menor Island)	Zambales	Tourism	15°44′05″N 119°49′28″E
Hijo Airstrip			Tagum	Davao del Norte	Agriculture	07°23′09″N 125°49′43″E
Huma Island Resort Seaplane Terminal			Busuanga (Dicilingan Island)	Palawan	Tourism	12°03′12″N 119°54′16″E
Ibonan Airstrip			Dingalan	Aurora	General aviation	15°18′28″N 121°22′30″E
~~Inandeng Airstrip~~			San Vicente	Palawan	~~General aviation~~	10°31′34″N 119°16′53″E
Isugod Airstrip			Quezon	Palawan	General aviation	09°20′09″N 118°08′05″E
Jesus F. Magsaysay (Castillejos) Airfield	RPUJ		Castillejos	Zambales	General aviation	14°56′48″N 120°11′25″E
Kalamansig Airport			Kalamansig	Sultan Kudarat	Agriculture	06°33′35″N 124°03′12″E
Kalaong Airstrip			Maitum	Sarangani	Agriculture	06°04′53″N 124°27′56″E
Kasapa Airstrip			Loreto	Agusan del Sur	Forestry	08°09′56″N 125°38′04″E
Kasilak Airstrip			Panabo	Davao del Norte	Agriculture	07°19′59″N 125°35′49″E
Kenram Airport	RPMK		Isulan	Sultan Kudarat	Agriculture	06°39′44″N 124°36′41″E
Kling Airstrip			Kiamba	Sarangani	Agriculture	05°56′15″N 124°44′39″E
La Filipina Airstrip			Tagum	Davao del Norte	Agriculture	07°28′22″N 125°47′16″E
~~Laconon Airstrip~~			T'Boli	South Cotabato	~~Agriculture~~	06°08′57″N 124°47′11″E
~~Lagao Airstrip~~			General Santos	—	~~General aviation~~	06°09′17″N 125°09′37″E
~~Lahuy Airstrip~~			Caramoan (Lahuy Island)	Camarines Sur	~~Mining~~	13°55′15″N 123°48′54″E
Lakawon Resort Seaplane Terminal			Cadiz (Ilacaon Island)	Negros Occidental	Tourism	11°02′20″N 123°12′13″E
Lambayong Airstrip			Lambayong	Sultan Kudarat	Agriculture	06°50′49″N 124°38′41″E
Lamidan Airstrip			Don Marcelino	Davao Occidental	Agriculture	06°04′29″N 125°42′04″E
~~Laminga Airstrip~~			La Paz	Agusan del Sur	~~Forestry~~	08°17′09″N 125°45′02″E
Lanuza (Carmen) Airstrip			Lanuza	Surigao del Sur	General aviation	09°13′51″N 125°59′52″E
~~Lapanday Airstrip~~			Davao City	—	~~Agriculture~~	07°09′11″N 125°34′56″E
Larap (Jose Panganiban) Airport	RPUP		Jose Panganiban	Camarines Norte	Mining	14°17′28″N 122°38′46″E
~~Latuan Airstrip~~			Isabela	Basilan	~~Agriculture~~	06°43′34″N 122°01′06″E
~~Latud Airstrip~~			Rizal	Palawan	~~General aviation~~	08°37′29″N 117°16′46″E
Lebak Rural Airport		LWA	Lebak	Sultan Kudarat	Agriculture	06°40′21″N 124°03′28″E
Lebak Airstrip			Lebak	Sultan Kudarat	Agriculture	06°37′17″N 124°03′18″E
Lepanto Airstrip			Mankayan	Benguet	Mining	16°52′14″N 120°46′45″E
Limasawa Airstrip			Limasawa	Southern Leyte	General aviation	09°57′42″N 125°03′39″E
Limo-ok (LARBECO) Airstrip			Lamitan	Basilan	Agriculture	06°38′11″N 122°07′24″E
~~Long Beach Airstrip~~			Morong	Bataan	~~General aviation~~	14°41′19″N 120°15′45″E
Lucena Airport	~~RPUE~~		Lucena	Quezon	General aviation	13°55′52″N 121°36′04″E
Lunga-og Airstrip			Santo Tomas	Davao del Norte	Agriculture	07°32′40″N 125°41′59″E
Lurugan Airfield			Valencia	Bukidnon	Agriculture	07°58′48″N 125°03′03″E
~~Lutopan Airstrip~~			Toledo	Cebu	~~Mining~~	10°19′22″N 123°42′25″E
Mabantao Airstrip			Kapalong	Davao del Norte	Agriculture	07°37′16″N 125°43′45″E
Mabag Airstrip			Aparri (Mabag Island)	Cagayan	Tourism	18°53′05″N 121°15′25″E
Maconacon Airport			Maconacon	Isabela	General aviation	17°22′59″N 122°14′52″E
~~Madaum (Old Hijo) Airstrip~~			Tagum	Davao del Norte	~~Agriculture~~	07°22′19″N 125°49′07″E
Maduao Airstrip			Panabo	Davao del Norte	Agriculture	07°16′38″N 125°39′05″E
~~Magallanes Airstrip~~			Magallanes	Agusan del Norte	~~General aviation~~	09°02′39″N 125°31′31″E
Magapit Airstrip			Lal-lo	Cagayan	Forestry	18°07′46″N 121°41′11″E
Magat River Multipurpose Project (MRMP) Airport	RP14		Ramon	Isabela	Industry	16°49′47″N 121°30′01″E
Magatos Airstrip			Asuncion	Davao del Norte	Agriculture	07°33′02″N 125°43′49″E
Malalag Airstrip			Malalag	Davao del Sur	Agriculture	06°34′18″N 125°23′48″E
~~Malamaui Airstrip~~			Isabela	Basilan	~~General aviation~~	06°43′18″N 121°58′12″E
Malangas Airstrip			Malangas	Zamboanga Sibugay	Mining	07°39′02″N 123°01′05″E
Malita Airport	RP17		Malita	Davao Occidental	General aviation	06°24′08″N 125°37′09″E
Malubal Airstrip			Roseller T. Lim	Zamboanga Sibugay	Forestry	07°42′08″N 122°24′42″E
Mampising (LADECO-Maryland) Airstrip			Mabini	Davao de Oro	Agriculture	07°15′43″N 125°50′33″E
Manato Airstrip			Milagros	Masbate	Agriculture	12°11′03″N 123°37′13″E
Mangal Airstrip			Sumisip	Basilan	Agriculture	06°25′31″N 121°58′46″E
Mapawa Airstrip			Maragusan	Davao de Oro	Agriculture	07°18′28″N 126°08′47″E
Maramag Airport		XMA	Maramag	Bukidnon	Agriculture	07°45′11″N 125°02′00″E
Maraymaray Airstrip			Don Carlos	Bukidnon	Agriculture	07°42′41″N 124°57′04″E
Marsman Airstrip			Santo Tomas	Davao del Norte	Agriculture	07°30′45″N 125°38′31″E
Mawab Airstrip			Mawab	Davao de Oro	Agriculture	07°31′56″N 125°56′38″E
Menzi (Cabunbata) Airfield / Seahawk Landing Zone	RP16		Isabela	Basilan	Agriculture	06°39′22″N 121°58′47″E
Milbuk Airstrip			Palimbang	Sultan Kudarat	Agriculture	06°09′38″N 124°16′49″E
MILUDECO Airstrip			Kiamba	Sarangani	Agriculture	06°01′01″N 124°35′06″E
~~Minuyan Airstrip~~			Norzagaray	Bulacan	~~Mining~~	14°53′13″N 121°07′22″E
Mountainview College Airstrip			Valencia	Bukidnon	General aviation	07°59′17″N 125°01′37″E
Nabulao Airstrip			Sipalay	Negros Occidental	Mining	09°39′53″N 122°32′08″E
Nampicuan Airstrip			Nampicuan	Nueva Ecija	General aviation	15°44′37″N 120°38′20″E
~~Nasugbu Airfield~~			Nasugbu	Batangas	~~General aviation~~	14°04′56″N 120°37′49″E
~~Nasuli (Bangcud) Airstrip~~			Malaybalay	Bukidnon	~~General aviation~~	08°00′23″N 125°07′39″E
Neda Airstrip			Monkayo	Davao de Oro	Agriculture	07°44′23″N 126°04′30″E
New Corella Airstrip			New Corella	Davao del Norte	Agriculture	07°36′33″N 125°48′13″E
Nonoc Airport	RP13		Surigao City (Nonoc Island)	Surigao del Norte	Mining	09°48′33″N 125°35′42″E
OMNI Aviation Complex			Mabalacat	Pampanga	General aviation	15°10′17″N 120°33′48″E
Pagbilao Grande Airport	RP12		Pagbilao (Pagbilao Grande Island)	Quezon	Industry	13°54′01″N 121°44′39″E
Pamalican (Amanpulo) Airport	RPUA		Agutaya (Pamalican Island)	Palawan	Tourism	11°21′31″N 120°43′40″E
Pangi (Rico Vista) Airstrip			Maco	Davao de Oro	Agriculture	07°26′50″N 125°50′28″E
Paniqui Airstrip			Paniqui	Tarlac	General aviation	15°40′28″N 120°36′07″E
Paracale Airstrip			Paracale	Camarines Norte	Mining	14°17′17″N 122°48′02″E
PASAR-LIDE Airport	RP15		Isabel	Leyte	Industry	10°54′44″N 124°26′16″E
~~PICOP Airstrip~~			Bislig	Surigao del Sur	~~Industry~~	08°11′43″N 126°21′35″E
Pinili (Upper Pampanga River Project) Airstrip			San Jose	Nueva Ecija	Industry	15°45′50″N 121°02′03″E
Pintatagan Airstrip			Banaybanay	Davao Oriental	Agriculture	07°04′39″N 125°56′29″E
~~Polomolok (Dole Cannery) Airstrip~~			Polomolok	South Cotabato	~~Agriculture~~	06°14′37″N 125°05′51″E
Poon Coto Airstrip			Masinloc	Zambales	Mining	15°34′51″N 120°04′05″E
President Quirino Airstrip			President Quirino	Sultan Kudarat	Agriculture	06°42′41″N 124°43′40″E
Refugio Airstrip			San Carlos	Negros Occidental	Agriculture	10°30′55″N 123°26′50″E
Rio Tuba Airport			Bataraza	Palawan	Mining	08°32′57″N 117°26′10″E
Rizal Airstrip			Rizal	Palawan	General aviation	09°00′46″N 117°39′19″E
~~Rizal (PNOC-EDC) Airstrip~~			Kananga	Leyte	~~Industry~~	11°09′52″N 124°36′01″E
Sagay Airstrip			Sagay	Negros Occidental	Agriculture	10°52′28″N 123°24′54″E
Sagpangan Airstrip			Aborlan	Palawan	General aviation	09°30′37″N 118°33′12″E
~~Samal (Bataan 2020, Inc.) Airport~~			Samal	Bataan	~~Industry~~	14°46′15″N 120°30′26″E
Sampao Airstrip			Kapalong	Davao del Norte	Agriculture	07°36′11″N 125°39′16″E
San Antonio (Dalupiri) Airport			San Antonio (Dalupiri Island)	Northern Samar	General aviation	12°25′04″N 124°16′26″E
San Isidro (Dolores Timber) Airstrip			Las Navas	Northern Samar	Forestry	12°15′20″N 125°03′36″E
San Isidro (SODACO) Airstrip			San Isidro	Davao Oriental	Agriculture	06°49′34″N 126°05′59″E
~~San Luis (Baculin Bay) Airstrip~~			Caraga	Davao Oriental	~~Agriculture~~	07°25′58″N 126°32′42″E
Sangi Airport			Toledo	Cebu	Industry	10°23′35″N 123°38′41″E
~~Santa Josefa (Aurora) Airstrip~~			Santa Josefa	Agusan del Sur	~~Agriculture~~	08°01′20″N 126°00′57″E
Santa Rosa (Voice of America) Airstrip			Concepcion	Tarlac	General aviation	15°23′05″N 120°37′28″E
Semirara Airstrip	RPUE		Caluya (Semirara Island)	Antique	Mining	12°04′29″N 121°23′19″E
~~Siasi Airport~~		SSV	Siasi	Sulu	~~Agriculture~~	05°34′04″N 120°50′36″E
Sicogon Airport	RPSG	ICO	Carles (Sicogon Island)	Iloilo	Tourism	11°27′35″N 123°15′03″E
Sipalay Airport (San Jose Airstrip)			Sipalay	Negros Occidental	Tourism/general aviation (formerly: mining)	09°47′33″N 122°27′06″E
Sirawai Airport			Sirawai	Zamboanga del Norte	Agriculture	07°35′12″N 122°09′27″E
SUMAPI (Old Busuanga) Airstrip			Busuanga (Busuanga Island)	Palawan	Agriculture	12°09′43″N 119°54′28″E
TADECO I (North) Airstrip			Braulio E. Dujali	Davao del Norte	Agriculture	07°26′11″N 125°35′59″E
TADECO II (South) Airstrip			Panabo	Davao del Norte	Agriculture	07°23′28″N 125°34′18″E
Tagbina Airstrip			Tagbina	Surigao del Sur	Agriculture	08°28′39″N 126°08′02″E
Tagbita Airport		TGB	Rizal	Palawan	Mining	08°42′54″N 117°21′12″E
Taggat Airstrip			Claveria	Cagayan	General aviation	18°36′16″N 121°03′43″E
Talakag Airstrip			Talakag	Bukidnon	Agriculture	08°14′46″N 124°36′05″E
Tambo Airstrip			Tayasan	Negros Oriental	Agriculture	09°54′59″N 123°04′25″E
Tampakan Airstrip			Tampakan	South Cotabato	Agriculture	06°24′43″N 124°56′03″E
Tapian Airport			Santa Cruz	Marinduque	Mining	13°26′27″N 121°58′51″E
Tibagon Airstrip			Pantukan	Davao de Oro	Agriculture	07°14′54″N 125°50′37″E
Tolong Airstrip			Santa Catalina	Negros Oriental	Agriculture	09°19′17″N 122°52′40″E
Tumajubong Airstrip			Sumisip	Basilan	Agriculture	06°28′50″N 122°02′19″E
~~Tungao Airstrip~~			Butuan	—	~~Forestry~~	08°46′23″N 125°32′47″E
Two Seasons Resort Seaplane Terminal			Coron (Bulalacao Island)	Palawan	Tourism	11°46′38″N 120°08′05″E
~~VICMICO Airstrip~~			Victorias	Negros Occidental	~~Agriculture~~	10°52′53″N 123°04′21″E
Waloe Airstrip			Loreto	Agusan del Sur	Forestry	08°13′01″N 125°47′02″E
Woodland Airpark (Gordon Boyce Airfield)			Magalang	Pampanga	General aviation	15°15′15″N 120°40′39″E

=== Military airfields ===
Military facility name	ICAO	IATA	Actual location	Usage	Coordinates
Basilio Fernando Air Base	RPUL		Lipa, Batangas	Military	13°57′17″N 121°07′29″E
Camp Mateo Capinpin Airfield	RPLM		Tanay, Rizal	Military	14°32′05″N 121°21′49″E
Cesar Basa Air Base	RPUF		Floridablanca, Pampanga	Military	14°59′11″N 120°29′33″E
Danilo Atienza Air Base (formerly U.S. Naval Station Sangley Point)	RPLS	SGL	Cavite City, Cavite	Military	14°29′29″N 120°53′38″E
Ernesto Rabina Air Base (formerly Crow Valley Gunnery Range)	RPLQ		Capas, Tarlac	Military	15°19′03″N 120°25′22″E
Fort Magsaysay Airfield	RPLV		Santa Rosa, Nueva Ecija	Military	15°26′02″N 121°05′24″E
Jose Paredes Air Station Airstrip			Pasuquin and Burgos, Ilocos Norte	Military	18°24′11″N 120°40′00″E
Kindley Landing Field, Corregidor	RPLX		Cavite City, Cavite	Military	14°23′29″N 120°36′26″E
Godofredo Juliano Air Base	RPML		Cagayan de Oro	Military	08°24′56″N 124°36′40″E
Rajah Buayan Air Base	RPMB		General Santos	Military	06°06′20″N 125°14′06″E
Rancudo Airfield	RPPN		Kalayaan, Palawan	Military	11°03′05″N 114°17′01″E
San Vicente Naval Airfield within Naval Base Camilo Osias			Santa Ana, Cagayan	Military	18°30′13″N 122°08′56″E
Sibutu Airfield			Sibutu, Tawi-Tawi	Military	04°50′35″N 119°27′38″E
Tarumpitao Point Airfield	RPTP		Rizal, Palawan	Military	09°02′37″N 117°37′59″E
Wallace Drone Launch Facility within Naval Station Ernesto Ogbinar	RPLW		San Fernando, La Union	Military	16°37′05″N 120°17′00″E
Antonio Bautista Air Base and Puerto Princesa International Airport	RPVP	PPS	Puerto Princesa	Mixed military-civilian use	09°44′31″N 118°45′31″E
Clark Air Base and Clark International Airport	RPLC	CRK	Clark Freeport Zone	Mixed military-civilian use	15°11′09″N 120°33′35″E
Edwin Andrews Air Base and Zamboanga International Airport	RPMZ	ZAM	Zamboanga City	Mixed military-civilian use	06°55′20″N 122°03′34″E
Mactan-Benito Ebuen Air Base and Mactan–Cebu International Airport	RPVM	CEB	Lapu-Lapu	Mixed military-civilian use	10°18′48″N 123°58′58″E
Jesus Villamor Air Base (formerly Nichols Field) and Ninoy Aquino International Airport	RPLL	MNL	Parañaque/Pasay	Mixed military-civilian use	14°30′31″N 121°01′10″E
~~Angeles Airfield~~ [defunct]			Angeles City	Former military use	15°07′16″N 120°35′45″E
~~Angeles Northeast Airfield~~ [defunct]			Angeles City	Former military use	15°09′18″N 120°35′54″E
~~Angeles South (Lara) Airfield~~ [defunct]			Bacolor, Pampanga	Former military use	15°04′54″N 120°36′05″E
~~Angeles West Airfield~~ [defunct]			Angeles City	Former military use	15°07′44″N 120°34′00″E
~~Alicante Airfield~~ [defunct]			Victorias, Negros Occidental	Former military use	10°53′21″N 123°01′07″E
~~Bamban Airfield~~ [defunct]			Bamban, Tarlac	Former military use	15°18′03″N 120°35′29″E
~~Batangas Airfield~~ [defunct]			Batangas City, Batangas	Former military use	13°46′28″N 121°03′49″E
~~Bayug Airfield~~ [defunct]			Burauen, Leyte	Former military use	10°58′49″N 124°54′18″E
~~Buri Airfield~~ [defunct]			Burauen, Leyte	Former military use	10°59′33″N 124°54′06″E
~~Cabatuan Airfield~~ [defunct]			Cabatuan, Iloilo	Former military use	10°50′47″N 122°30′21″E
~~Cabanatuan (Maniquis/Camp Tinio) Airfield~~ [defunct]	RPUC		Cabanatuan, Nueva Ecija	Former military use	15°29′11″N 121°02′30″E
~~Cabcaben Airfield~~ [defunct]			Mariveles, Bataan	Former military use	14°27′24″N 120°35′31″E
~~Calarian Airfield~~ [defunct]			Zamboanga City	Former military use	06°55′34″N 122°01′38″E
~~Camalaniugan Airfield~~ [defunct]			Camalaniugan, Cagayan	Former military use	18°18′03″N 121°39′53″E
~~Canlubang (Yulo) Airfield~~ [defunct]			Calamba, Laguna	Former military use	14°13′26″N 121°05′59″E
~~Carolina Airfield~~ [defunct]			Manapla, Negros Occidental	Former military use	10°57′32″N 123°10′34″E
U.S. Naval Air Station Cubi Point (now Subic Bay International Airport)	RPLB	SFS	Morong, Bataan	Former military use	14°47′40″N 120°16′16″E
~~Old Del Monte Airfield~~ [defunct]			Manolo Fortich, Bukidnon	Former military use	08°21′41″N 124°49′59″E
~~Dulag Airfield~~ [defunct]			Dulag, Leyte	Former military use	10°56′53″N 125°00′37″E
~~Dumarao Airfield~~ [defunct]			Dumarao, Capiz	Former military use	11°15′42″N 122°40′31″E
~~Echague Airfield~~ [defunct]			Echague, Isabela	Former military use	16°42′05″N 121°39′21″E
~~Elmore Airfield~~ [defunct]			San Jose, Occidental Mindoro	Former military use	12°26′50″N 121°04′47″E
~~Grace Park (Manila North) Airfield~~ [defunct]			Caloocan	Former military use	14°39′05″N 120°59′26″E
~~Hill Airfield~~ [defunct]			San Jose, Occidental Mindoro	Former military use	12°23′28″N 121°03′13″E
~~Lamao (Bataan) Airfield~~ [defunct]			Limay, Bataan	Former military use	14°31′38″N 120°36′04″E
~~La Carlota Airfield~~ [defunct]			La Carlota, Negros Occidental	Former military use	10°25′30″N 122°54′23″E
~~Libby Airfield~~ [defunct]			Davao City	Former military use	07°03′31″N 125°31′30″E
~~Luna Airfield~~ [defunct]			Luna, La Union	Former military use	16°51′52″N 120°22′58″E
~~Mabalacat East Airfield~~ [defunct]			Mabalacat, Pampanga	Former military use	15°14′21″N 120°34′08″E
~~Mabalacat West Airfield~~ [defunct]			Mabalacat, Pampanga	Former military use	15°13′02″N 120°33′00″E
~~Mandaluyong East Airfield~~ [defunct]			Mandaluyong	Former military use	14°34′41″N 121°03′26″E
~~Mangaldan Airfield~~ [defunct]			Mangaldan, Pangasinan	Former military use	16°03′40″N 120°23′49″E
~~Marikina Airfield~~ [defunct]			Marikina	Former military use	14°38′32″N 121°05′59″E
~~Mariveles Airfield~~ [defunct]			Mariveles, Bataan	Former military use	14°26′06″N 120°28′37″E
~~Matina Airfield~~ [defunct]			Davao City	Former military use	07°03′21″N 125°35′34″E
~~Medellin Airfield~~ [defunct]	RPVN		Medellin, Cebu	Former military use	11°08′26″N 123°57′35″E
~~Murtha Airfield~~ [defunct]			San Jose, Occidental Mindoro	Former military use	12°25′32″N 121°05′51″E
~~Naguilian Airfield~~ [defunct]			Naguilian, La Union	Former military use	16°32′05″N 120°23′49″E
~~Naulo Point Airfield~~ [defunct]			Santa Cruz, Zambales	Former military use	15°42′41″N 119°53′54″E
~~Nielson Airfield~~ [defunct]			Makati	Former military use	14°33′25″N 121°01′16″E
~~Pasig Airfield~~ [defunct]			Pasig	Former military use	14°35′17″N 121°05′45″E
~~Pilar Airfield~~ [defunct]			Pilar, Bataan	Former military use	14°39′51″N 120°33′00″E
~~Porac Airfield~~ [defunct]			Porac, Pampanga	Former military use	15°03′11″N 120°32′32″E
~~Punta Baja Airfield~~ [defunct]			Rizal, Palawan	Former military use	09°03′47″N 117°39′19″E
~~Quezon Airfield~~ [defunct]			Quezon City	Former military use	14°38′58″N 121°02′03″E
~~San Manuel Airfield~~ [defunct]			Tarlac City, Tarlac	Former military use	15°29′37″N 120°38′35″E
~~San Marcelino Airfield~~ [defunct]			San Marcelino, Zambales	Former military use	14°57′39″N 120°12′26″E
~~San Pablo Airfield~~ [defunct]			Burauen, Leyte	Former military use	10°59′01″N 124°55′32″E
Cagayan North International Airport			Cagayan	Civilian/military	18°10′52″N 121°44′42″E
~~Tanauan Airfield~~ [defunct]			Tanauan, Leyte	Former military use	11°06′15″N 125°01′14″E
~~Zablan Airfield~~ [defunct]			Quezon City	Former military use	14°36′31″N 121°04′09″E
~~Zablan Auxiliary Airfield~~ [defunct]			Quezon City	Former military use	14°35′45″N 121°04′48″E

=== Airports being planned or under construction ===
The list below only includes new air transportation facilities being proposed or are under construction.

Airport name	Status	Type	Actual location	Coordinates
Baguio-Tuba International Airport	Proposed	International	Tuba, Benguet	
Cagayan Valley International Airport	Proposed	International	Tumauini, Isabela	
Carabao Island International Airport	Private sector proposal rejected	International	San Jose, Romblon	
Cotabato City International Airport	Chinese-firm study (PPP scheme bidding agreed)	International	Tamontaka I to Tamontaka III, Cotabato City	
Dumaguete-Bacong International Airport	Land Acquisition	International	Bacong, Negros Oriental	
New Manila International Airport	Land development ongoing / JICA study completion pending	International	Bulakan, Bulacan	14°44′24″N 120°52′30″E
New Zamboanga International Airport	Proposed	International	Zamboanga City	06°57′29″N 122°09′55″E
Agutaya Airport	Under construction	Domestic	Agutaya, Palawan	11°09′33″N 120°57′14″E
Alaminos (Pangasinan) Airport	Construction on hold	Domestic	Alaminos, Pangasinan	16°08′37″N 120°02′04″E
Balabac Airport	PPP bidding pending	Domestic	Balabac, Palawan	08°04′35″N 117°06′30″E
Bukidnon Airport (Maraymaray Airstrip)	Under construction	Domestic	Don Carlos, Bukidnon	07°42′41″N 124°57′04″E
Calayan Airport	Under construction	Domestic	Calayan, Cagayan	19°15′25″N 121°29′23″E
Daanbantayan (North Cebu) Airstrip	Study pending	Domestic	Daanbantayan, Cebu	
Kabankalan Airport	Under construction	Domestic	Kabankalan, Negros Occidental	10°00′21″N 122°51′04″E
Lamitan Airport	Proposed	Domestic	Lamitan, Basilan	06°42′40″N 122°07′00″E
Libmanan Airport	Development suspended	Domestic	Libmanan, Camarines Sur	
Quirino Airport	Study pending	Domestic	Maddela, Quirino	
San Carlos Airport	Construction on hold	Domestic	San Carlos, Negros Occidental	10°30′35″N 123°26′06″E
Sultan Kudarat Airport	Study suspended	Domestic	President Quirino, Sultan Kudarat	

=== Closed airports ===
- Bacolod Domestic Airport – closed in 2008; replaced by Bacolod–Silay Airport which inherited its IATA (BCD) and ICAO (RPVB) codes

(Coordinates: 10°38′33.04″N 122°55′46.62″E)

- Malaybalay Airport (~~RPMY~~) – closed in the late 1990s, converted to low-cost housing area; its ICAO code was later reassigned to Laguindingan Airport

(Coordinates: 08°8′26″N 125°07′09″E)

- Mandurriao Airport – closed on June 13, 2007; replaced by Iloilo International Airport which inherited its IATA (ILO) and ICAO (RPVI) codes

(Coordinates 10°42′47.04″N 122°32′27.90″E)

- Lumbia Airport (RPML) – closed for civilian flights on June 15, 2013 and converted for military use; replaced by Laguindingan Airport

(Coordinates: 08°24′56″N 124°36′40″E)

- Tagbilaran Airport (~~RPVT~~) – closed on November 27, 2018; replaced by Bohol–Panglao International Airport which inherited its IATA code (TAG) and replaced its ICAO from (~~RPVT~~) to (RPSP)

(Coordinates: 09°39′50″N 123°51′11″E)

- Legazpi Airport (~~RPLP~~) – closed on October 7, 2021; replaced by Bicol International Airport and replaced its IATA from (~~LGP~~) to (DRP) and ICAO from (~~RPLP~~) to (RPLK)

(Coordinates:13°06′44″N 123°40′38″E)

== See also ==
- Busiest airports in the Philippines
- Airports in the Greater Manila Area
- Transportation in the Philippines
- List of airports by ICAO code: R#RP - Philippines
- Wikipedia:WikiProject Aviation/Airline destination lists: Asia#Philippines
