= Catbalogan Airport =

Airport serving Catbalogan, Samar, Philippines

Catbalogan Airport Luparan han Catbalogan Paliparan ng Catbalogan
- IATA: none; ICAO: RPVY

Summary
- Airport type: Public
- Operator: Civil Aviation Authority of the Philippines
- Serves: Catbalogan
- Location: Barangay Cabugawan, Buri Island, Catbalogan, Samar, Philippines
- Coordinates: 11°48′36″N 124°49′48″E

Map
- Location of airport in the Philippines

Runways
Direction	Length		Surface
Direction	m	ft	Surface
13/31	1,600	5,250	Concrete

Catbalogan Airport (Note: Waray: Luparan han Catbalogan, Filipino: Paliparan ng Catbalogan) (ICAO: RPVY) is an airport serving Catbalogan, the capital of Samar, Philippines. It is classified as a community airport by the Civil Aviation Authority of the Philippines (CAAP), a body of the Department of Transportation (DOTr) that is responsible for the operations of not only this airport but also other airports in the Philippines except the major international airports. Catbalogan Airport is located in Barangay Cabugawan on Buri Island. The airport was built in 1995, but left unfinished, leading Samar Governor Sharee Ann Tan to attempt to garner funding from the government for its completion. After the CAAP provided funding for the airport, the project gained the attention of the DOTr. On March 17, 2018, the first commercial flight in the airport was operated by Air Juan from the Mactan–Cebu International Airport, with two weekly flights from Cebu succeeding it. Operations ceased due to the onset of COVID-19 and a lack of passengers, with attempts to allocate more funding taking place years later. In 2024, the new terminal building was inaugurated. The airport helped cut travel time for local residents to Cebu according to the Philippine News Agency and was praised by politicians.

== History ==
=== Construction and funding ===
In 1995, the airport was built on Buri Island, utilizing ₱57,000,000; since then, the airport has never been used commercially and remained incomplete. On June 12, 2011, in a speech at Catbalogan during the 113th Philippine Independence Day celebration, Governor Sharee Ann Tan announced the construction and repair of the airport. The province held discussions with the Civil Aviation Authority of the Philippines (CAAP) to include the airport construction in their 2011 budget and the province allocated ₱30,000,000 for the apron and runway extension. Tan said that they did not have enough funding and projects would not start yet, arguing that Catbalogan was the center of the province of Samar and an airport was needed. Department of Transportation and Communication Secretary Joseph Emilio Abaya said that for continuation of construction, they needed ₱60,000,000, which included funding for the fencing of the airport. Tan, in a Samar Day Speech on August 13, 2012, said that the national funding was still not provided and expected the funding to be given by 2013 or her second gubernatorial term. The CAAP provided ₱94,000,000 to construct a parking area, fences, apron, runway, taxiway, a fire station, and a security fence in five years. The airport project gained attention from the national government in June 2017 when Department of Transportation (DOTr) Undersecretary and Catbalogan native Ferdinand Cui showed the project to DOTr Secretary Arthur Tugade. Cui had a meeting with Catbalogan Mayor Stephany Uy-Tan, who then met with Buri residents that would be affected by the project; the city government also asked Tugade for a higher budget for the airport and City Investment and Promotions Office officials held meetings with an airline company for a potential Cebu to Calbayog route. Department of Tourism Eastern Visayas Regional Director Karina Rosa Tiopes said the airport had potential for commercial operations, with a survey showing that there was a need for better air connectivity to and from Catbalogan.

=== Air Juan operations and present ===
On November 29, 2017, Air Juan officials visited the airport for inspection to see the viability of the facility after the CAAP allowed light aircraft to operate in the airport, planning the maiden flight in December. The test flight, with Air Juan and CAAP officials, landed at Catbalogan Airport on March 6, 2018. Mayor Uy-Tan celebrated Air Juan's planned operations and urged Catbalogan residents to support the development. On March 17, the official maiden flight operated by Air Juan from Cebu to Catbalogan was the first time the airport was commercially used since its conception in 1995, taking less than an hour to land in Catbalogan. Air Juan scheduled two flights per week to Catbalogan every Monday and Saturday, taking off every 11 a.m. with a stopover in Biliran unless the aircraft was fully booked for Guiuan. Mayor Uy-Tan thanked all officials who contributed to launching commercial operations in the airport. In 2018, when Bong Go visited Catbalogan to provide aid to fire victims, local officials approached him and asked if he could rush the land acquisition process for the airport repairs, leading Go to inform Tugade of the matter.

Due to the onset of COVID-19 and a lack of passengers, Air Juan ceased operations in the airport. Samar 2nd district Congressman Reynolds Michael Tan expressed frustration and disappointment over the lack of inclusion of Catbalogan Airport in the 2025 National Expenditure Program, stating in a budget hearing for the Department of Transportation (DOTr) that leaving the airport unfinished would waste the ₱2,600,000,000 used in constructing and repairing the airport, adding that leaving the airport unrepaired could lead to further deterioration. Although the DOTr made a request to the Department of Budget and Management to allocate ₱750,000,000 for the continuation of Catbalogan Airport's repair in 2025, particularly the creation of a security fence, asphalt overlay, and the removal of a nearby hill that posed risks to the aircraft, the request was rejected. In 2024, the new modern Catbalogan Airport passenger terminal building was inaugurated, increasing its capacity from 10 to 400 passengers, with a sustainable design and state-of-the-art facilities, according to the Manila Standard. A larger apron measuring 180 metres (590 feet) by 100 m (330 ft) was constructed to accommodate up to three Airbuses and two De Havilland Canada Dash 8 aircraft. Under the 2026 General Appropriations Act by House Minority Leader Marcelino Libanan, Catbalogan Airport was one of the 21 facilities provided government funding for modernization, receiving ₱200,000,000. As of 2024, there are no operations in the airport.

== Reception and effects ==
Roel Amazona of the Philippine News Agency said in an article on the maiden flight that the airport helped cut time in going to Cebu from Catbalogan, taking less than an hour instead of the three hours used via the Calbayog Airport, four hours via the Daniel Z. Romualdez Airport in Tacloban, and eight hours using a fast craft in Ormoc. Cui, then-Presidential Management Staff Undersecretary, said in the report: "This Catbalogan City Airport project is a necessity from the national government standpoint, not just from the standpoint of tourism development, but equally important for disaster risk reduction and management." In Mayor Uy-Tan's 5th State of the City Address on July 3, 2018, she attributed the city's tourism industry boom to the airport. On August 8, 2024, during Barangay Day, part of Samar province's founding anniversary celebrations, Senator Francis Tolentino said the airport was one of the "most beautiful airports in the country", thanking provincial officials for inviting him, partly for letting him "experience and showcase this beautiful airport for the first time".

== See also ==
- List of airports in the Philippines
