= Dr. Juan C. Angara Airport =

Baler Aurora Airport Paliparang Baler Aurora (Filipino) Pagtayaban ti Baler (Ilocano)
- IATA: BQA; ICAO: RPUR

Summary
- Airport type: Public
- Owner/Operator: Civil Aviation Authority of the Philippines
- Serves: Baler
- Location: Barangay San Isidro, San Luis, Aurora
- Elevation AMSL: 33 m / 108 ft
- Coordinates: 15°43′47″N 121°30′00″E

Map
- Location in the Philippines

Runways
Direction	Length		Surface
Direction	m	ft	Surface
05/23	1,200	3,937	Asphalt

Dr. Juan C. Angara Airport (Filipino: Paliparang Dr. Juan C. Angara, Ilocano: Pagtayaban ti Dr. Juan C. Angara), also known as Baler Airport (IATA: BQA, ICAO: RPUR), is an airport serving the general area of Baler, the capital of the province of Aurora, located in the province of Aurora in the Philippines. It is named after Juan Calderón Angara, the father of former provincial governor Bella Angara and Senator Edgardo Angara, sometime in early 2006.

Located in Barangay San Isidro in the neighboring municipality of San Luis, some 7 kilometers (4.3 mi) from Baler, the airport is classified as a community airport by the Civil Aviation Authority of the Philippines, the body of the Department of Transportation responsible for the operations of all public airports in the Philippines except the major international airports. Prior to being extended and paved with concrete, the runway was of sandy loam soil and measured 875 meters (2,871 ft) long by 30 meters (98 ft) wide.

SEAir used to fly to the airport twice a week from Manila. Air Juan commenced regularly scheduled flights to the airport from their private seaplane base at CCP Complex along Manila Bay in March 2017 using their nine-seater amphibious aircraft.

== Airlines and destinations ==
Airlines	Destinations
Air Juan	Manila Harbor (Air Juan Seaplane Terminal)

== Gallery ==
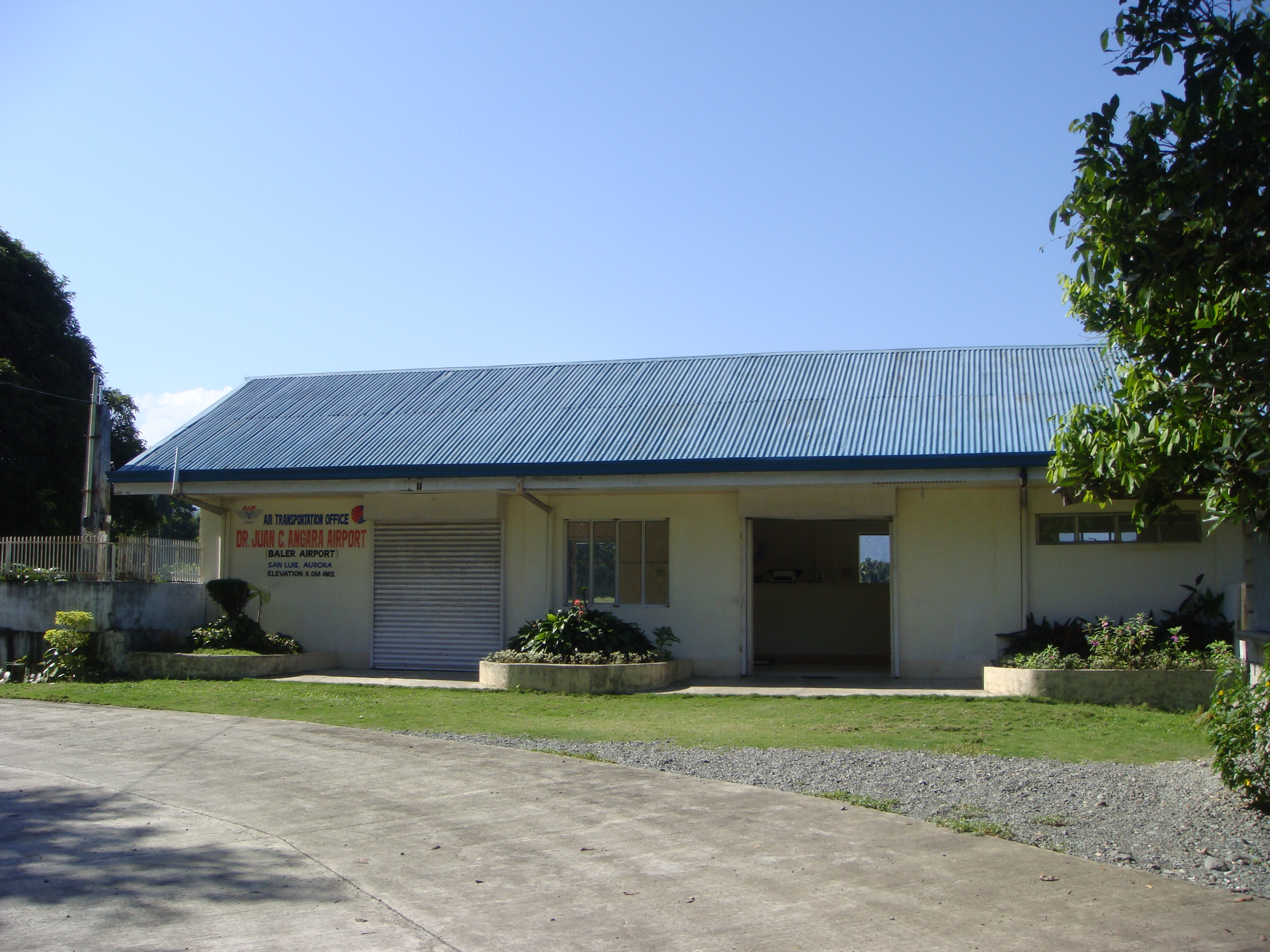
Airport terminal building, as of 2012

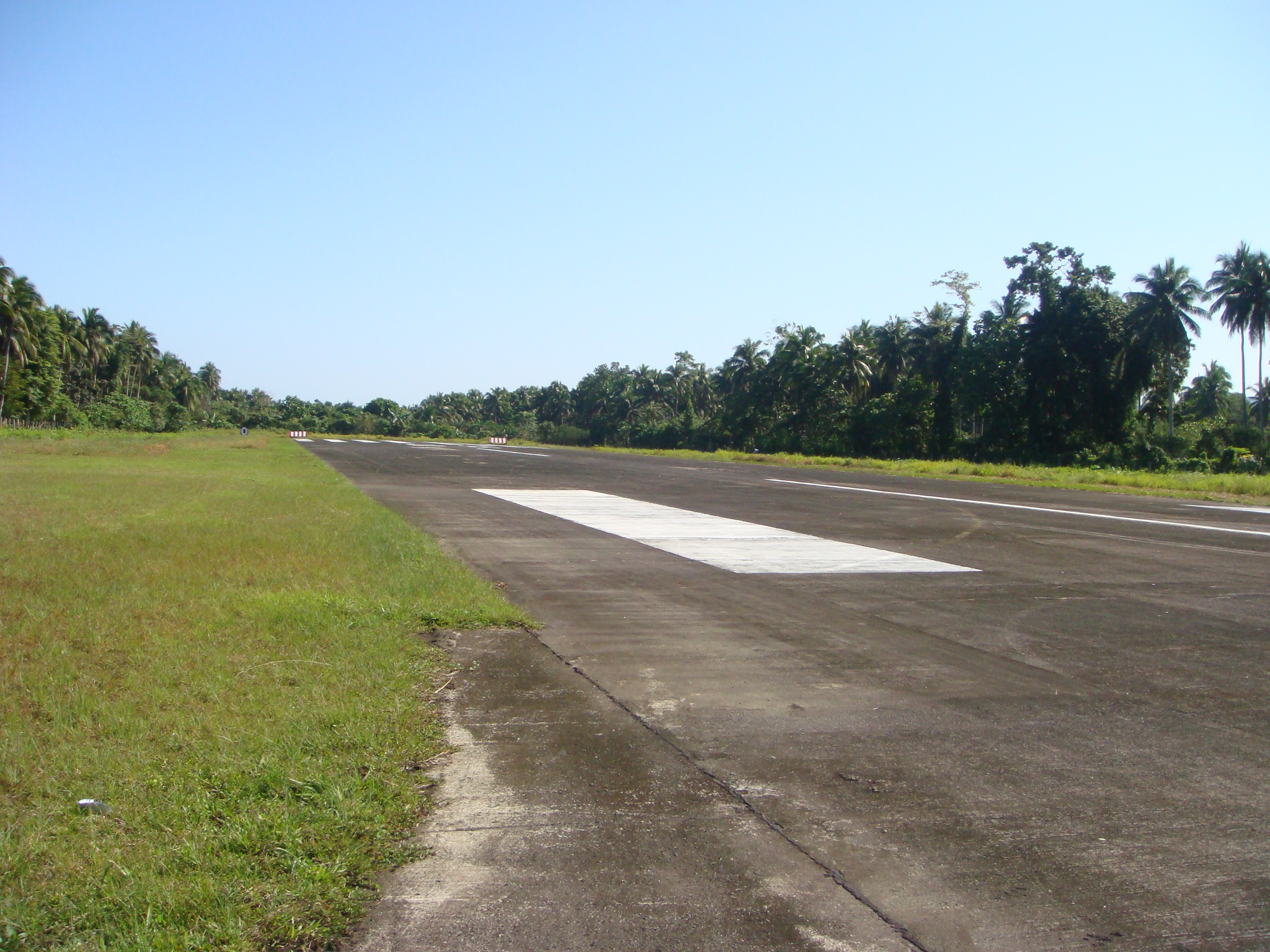
Airport runway, as of 2012

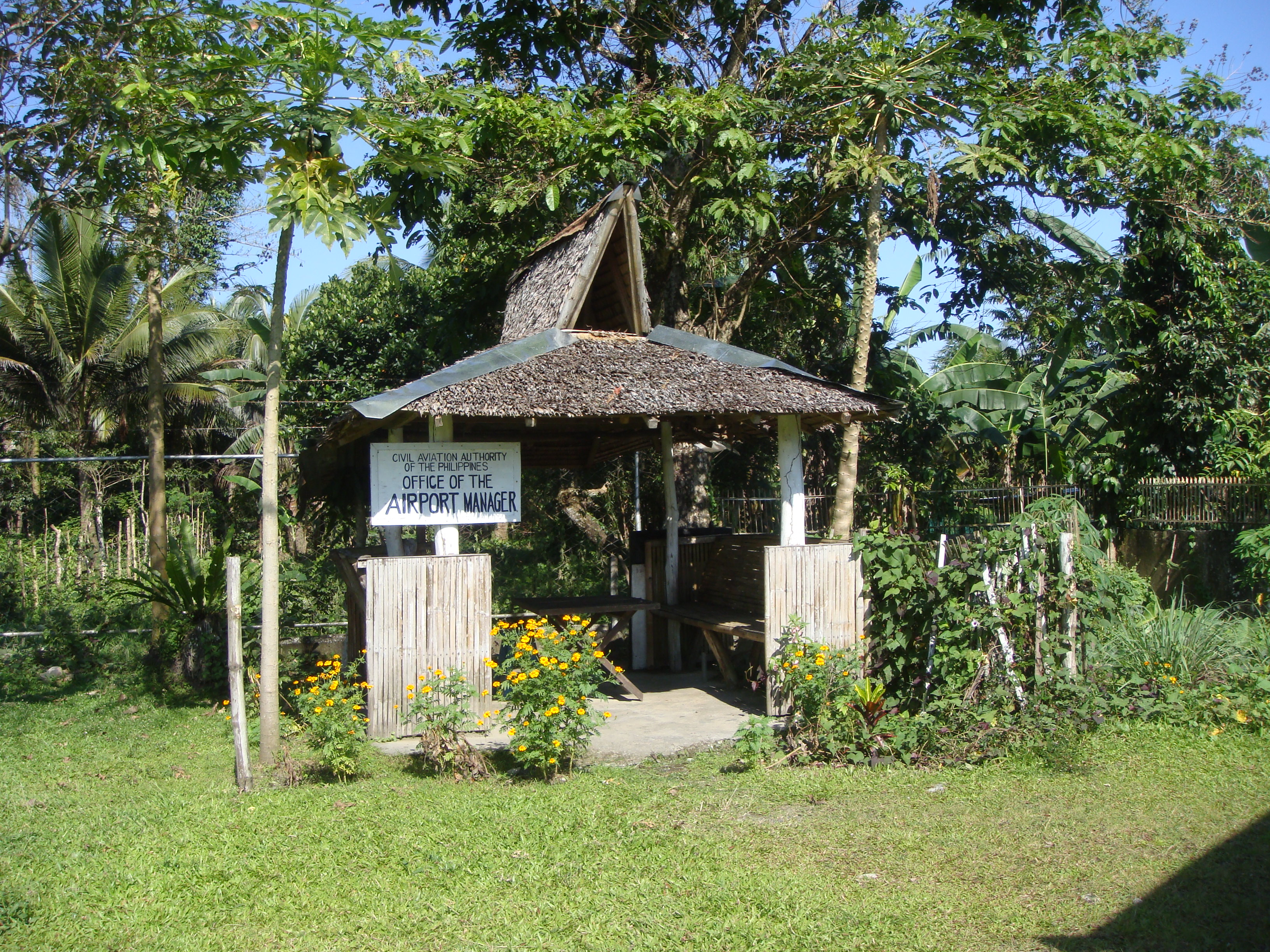
Airport manager's office kiosk, as of 2012

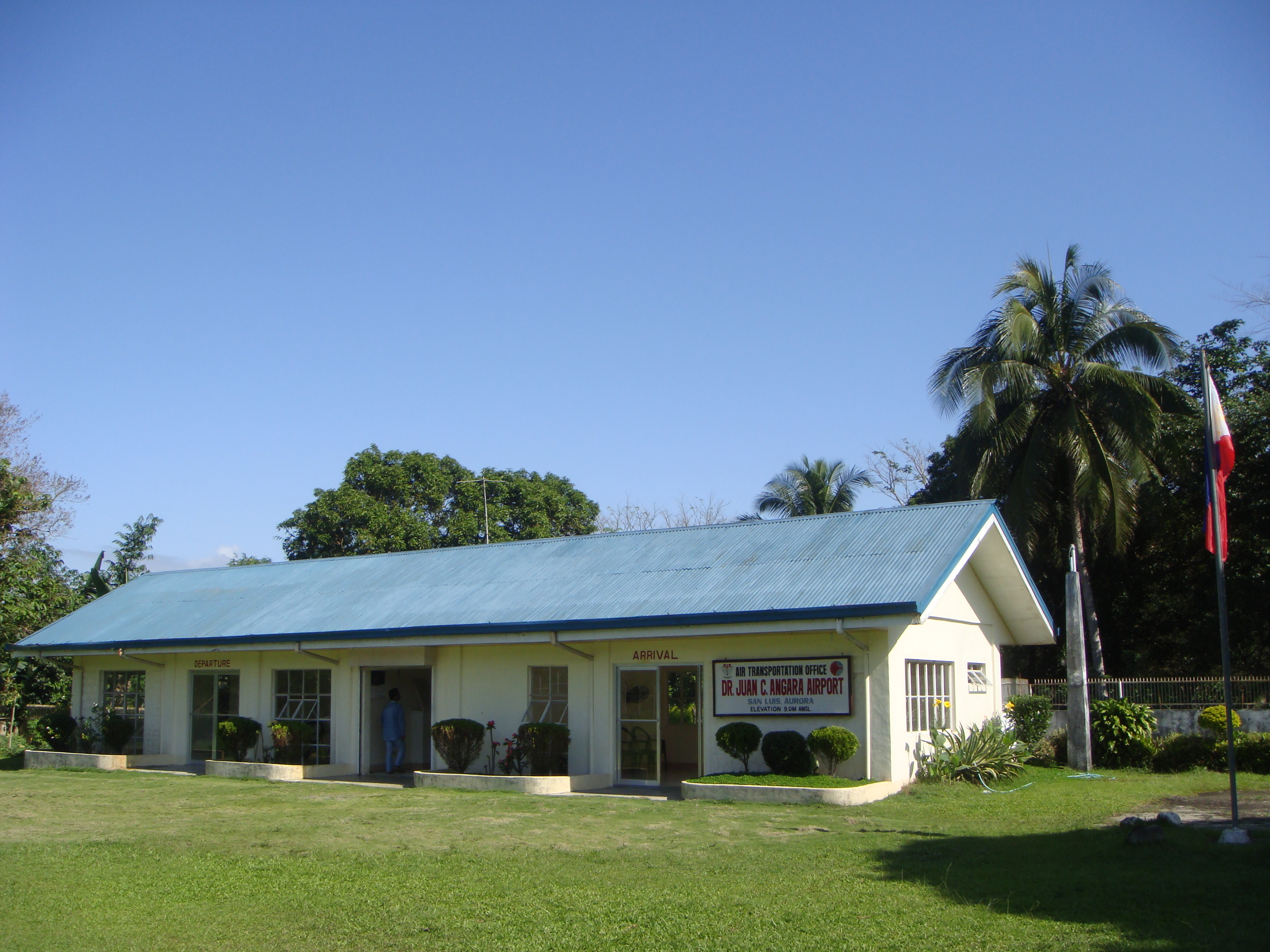
Airport terminal building, another view

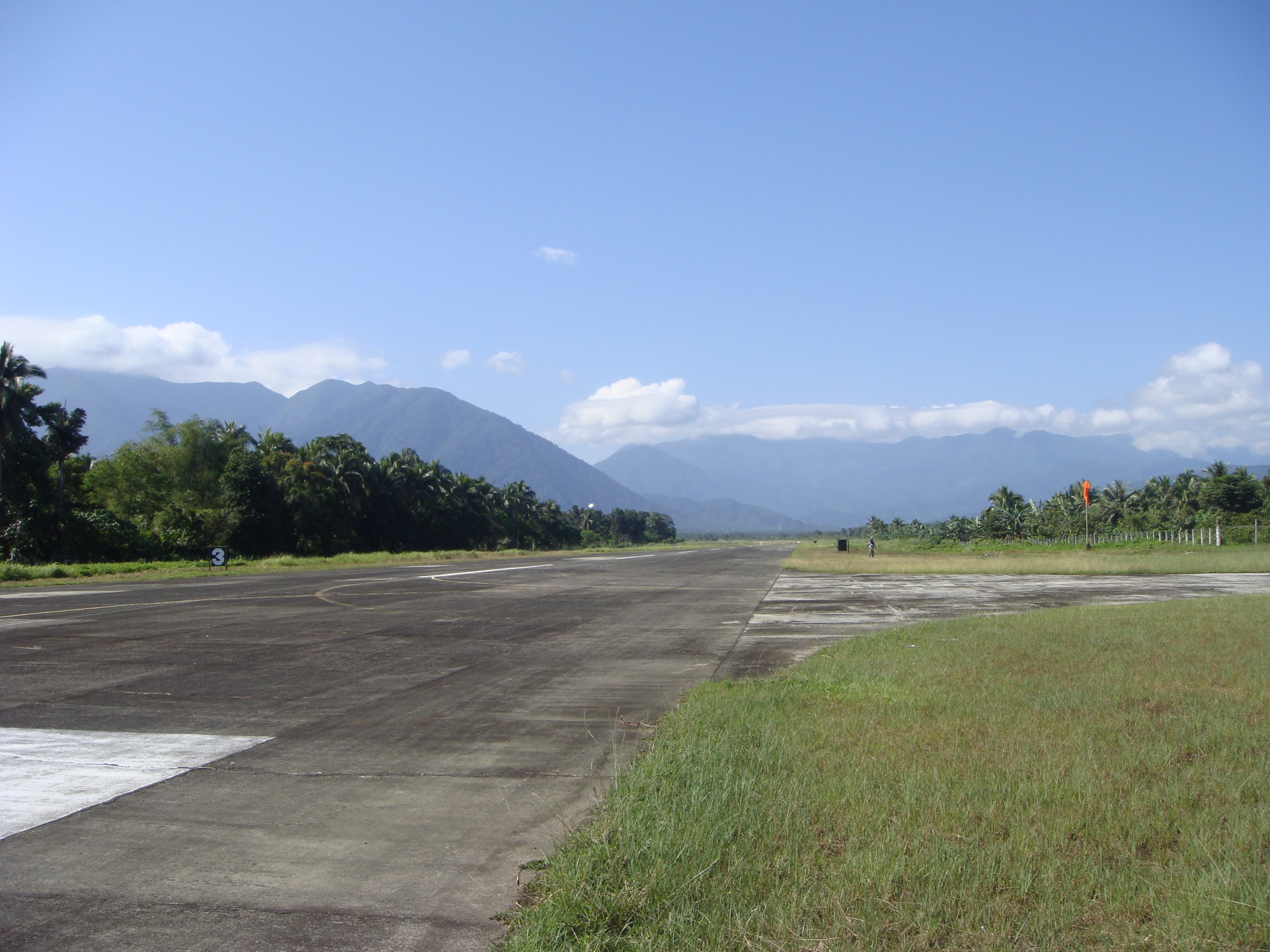
Airport runway, another view

== See also ==
- List of airports in the Philippines
