= Bukidnon Airport =

Airport in Northern Mindanao, Philippines

Bukidnon Airport Paliparan ng Bukidnon
- IATA: none; ICAO: none

Summary
- Airport type: Public
- Owner/Operator: Civil Aviation Authority of the Philippines
- Serves: Bukidnon
- Location: Barangay Maraymaray, Don Carlos, Bukidnon, Philippines
- Coordinates: 7°42′13″N 124°57′2″E

Map

Runways
Direction	Length		Surface
Direction	ft	m	Surface
			Concrete

Bukidnon Airport is a domestic airport currently under construction in Barangay Maraymaray, Don Carlos, Bukidnon, Philippines. It is the first modern airport to be built in the province, which has been without an operational aviation facility since the closure of the Malaybalay Airstrip in the late 1990s. The project is part of the Philippine government’s flagship infrastructure program and is expected to significantly improve connectivity, commerce, and tourism in Northern Mindanao.

== History ==
=== Early aviation in Bukidnon ===
The first aviation facility in the province was the Malaybalay Airstrip, later known as Malaybalay Airport, located in Barangay Casisang, Malaybalay City. It was a small gravel runway that accommodated light aircraft and general aviation. For a time, it provided limited connectivity to the landlocked province, but it never developed into a commercial hub. By the late 1990s, the airstrip was closed and the site was converted into a housing project, leaving Bukidnon without an operational airport and reliant on long overland travel to reach Laguindingan Airport in Misamis Oriental or Francisco Bangoy International Airport in Davao.

=== Planning and feasibility studies ===
The absence of an airport became increasingly significant as Bukidnon’s economy and population grew. In 2013, the Civil Aviation Authority of the Philippines (CAAP) completed a feasibility study for a new airport in the province. The study identified Don Carlos, in southern Bukidnon, as the most viable site due to its relatively flat terrain and accessibility to surrounding municipalities.

By 2015, the project had secured initial funding for land acquisition, with ₱20 million allocated for site acquisition, followed by an additional ₱34 million in 2017. The Department of Transportation (DOTr) and CAAP signed a memorandum of agreement to implement the project, with ₱630 million earmarked for landside and airside improvements from the 2017 and 2019 budgets.

=== Don Carlos Airport Project ===
The Bukidnon Airport Development Project was formally included in the government’s “Build, Build, Build” program in 2019. The chosen site in Barangay Maraymaray, Don Carlos, covers 149 hectares and is designed as a domestic airport compliant with international standards. The project was budgeted at approximately ₱2 billion, later adjusted upward to ₱2.8 billion with additional allocations for ancillary facilities.

Construction officially began on 2 August 2021 with Phase I, which included the concreting of a 1,260-meter by 30-meter runway, apron, and taxiways. Subsequent phases covered drainage systems, embankment works, and runway extensions. Phase II, completed in 2022, focused on embankment and apron areas. Phase III, launched in September 2022, included the construction of the passenger terminal building, runway strip, and a 390-meter runway extension.

The National Economic and Development Authority Regional Project Monitoring Committee of Northern Mindanao (RPMC-X) conducted multiple inspections of the site. In December 2020, the committee confirmed progress on the runway and noted the resettlement of affected families through the National Housing Authority’s Resettlement Assistance Program, which provided 41 housing units and 19 developed lots. A follow-up inspection in 2022 reported that the runway was nearing completion, while the terminal, taxiway, apron, and access roads were scheduled for completion by 2026.

The project has enjoyed consistent political backing, particularly from Senator Juan Miguel Zubiri, who hails from Bukidnon. In 2022, the DOTr confirmed that Bukidnon was among the provinces prioritized for new airport development under the Marcos administration’s infrastructure agenda. In August 2023, DOTr Secretary Jaime Bautista and CAAP Director General Manuel Antonio Tamayo met with Zubiri to discuss the continuous development of Bukidnon and Camiguin airports, underscoring the government’s commitment to completing the project.

=== Construction progress and phased development ===
By 2023, CAAP had bid out Phase IV of the project, which included the construction of the control tower, administration building, cargo terminal, firefighting facilities, and access roads.

In June 2024, CAAP officials confirmed that the airport was on track. Job De Jesus, CAAP Area Manager for Northern Mindanao, reported that the airport would initially accommodate turboprop aircraft in 2025 and expand to handle Airbus A320 jets by 2026. The passenger terminal building, with a capacity of 500 passengers and a floor area of 3,600 square meters.

As of April 2025, construction updates indicated that runway painting had begun, the passenger terminal building was in its roofing phase, the control tower was rising, and the cargo building was under structural work. Access roads and site development were also progressing).

=== Projected opening ===
The Bukidnon Airport is expected to become operational by 2026. Once completed, it will serve approximately 1.5 million residents of Bukidnon and nearby provinces, reducing travel time, boosting tourism, and facilitating agricultural exports. The airport is designed to accommodate aircraft such as the ATR 72 and De Havilland Canada Dash 8-400 turboprops, with future capacity for larger jets.
