= Kabankalan City Domestic Airport =

Kabankalan City Domestic Airport Paliparang Domestiko ng Lungsod ng Kabankalan Pangsulod-pungsod nga Hulugpaan sang Dakbanwa sang Kabankalan
- IATA: none; ICAO: none

Summary
- Airport type: Public
- Operator: Civil Aviation Authority of the Philippines
- Serves: Kabankalan
- Location: Barangay Hilamonan, Kabankalan, Negros Occidental
- Elevation AMSL: 35 m / 115 ft
- Coordinates: 10°0′26″N 122°51′06″E
- Interactive map of Kabankalan City Domestic Airport

Runways
Direction	Length		Surface
Direction	m	ft	Surface
unknown	1,800	5,906	Concrete

Kabankalan City Domestic Airport (Filipino: Paliparang Domestiko ng Lungsod ng Kabankalan, Hiligaynon: Pangsulod-pungsod nga Hulugpaan sang Dakbanwa sang Kabankalan) is a proposed airport designed to serve the general area of Kabankalan, located in the province of Negros Occidental in the Philippines. The airport would be the second airport in Negros Occidental, after the Bacolod–Silay Airport, and the third airport on the island of Negros. It is located four kilometers northeast of the Kabankalan City Proper on a 100-hectare site in Barangay Hilamonan.

The airport was mentioned in the 2006 State of the Nation Address of President Gloria Macapagal Arroyo, although the project is not receiving any funding from the Philippine government. The project is financed completely by the city government of Kabankalan, with the airport costing the city government around two hundred million pesos.

Construction on the new airport commenced on March 9, 2007, with completion slated supposedly by 2010. As of 2022, the installation of the concrete for the runway had neared completion, but funds for the construction of the terminal had not yet been allocated. However, as of 2022 it has not yet been classified by the Civil Aviation Authority of the Philippines and the construction is still on the works after it was placed on hold.

== Structure ==
Kabankalan City Domestic Airport will initially contain both cargo and passenger terminals, a control tower and loading and navigation systems. It will also have an initial 1,800-meter runway, although some sources indicate that the runway can have a length of up to 3,000 meters.

It is said that some of the equipment of Mandurriao Airport in Iloilo City, when closed, will be transferred and used at this airport. However, equipment and personnel instead from the old Bacolod City Domestic Airport will run and man the facility.

== See also ==
- List of airports in the Philippines
