= EUQ =

EUQ can refer to:

- Evelio B. Javier Airport, an airport in San Jose de Buenavista, Antique province, Philippines, by IATA code
- Vasconic languages, a supposed language family that groups together Basque and the extinct Aquitaine language, by ISO 639-5 code
