= Tandag Airport =

Airport in Surigao del Sur, Philippines

Tandag Airport Tugpahanan hong Tandag Tugpahanan sa Tandag Paliparan ng Tandag
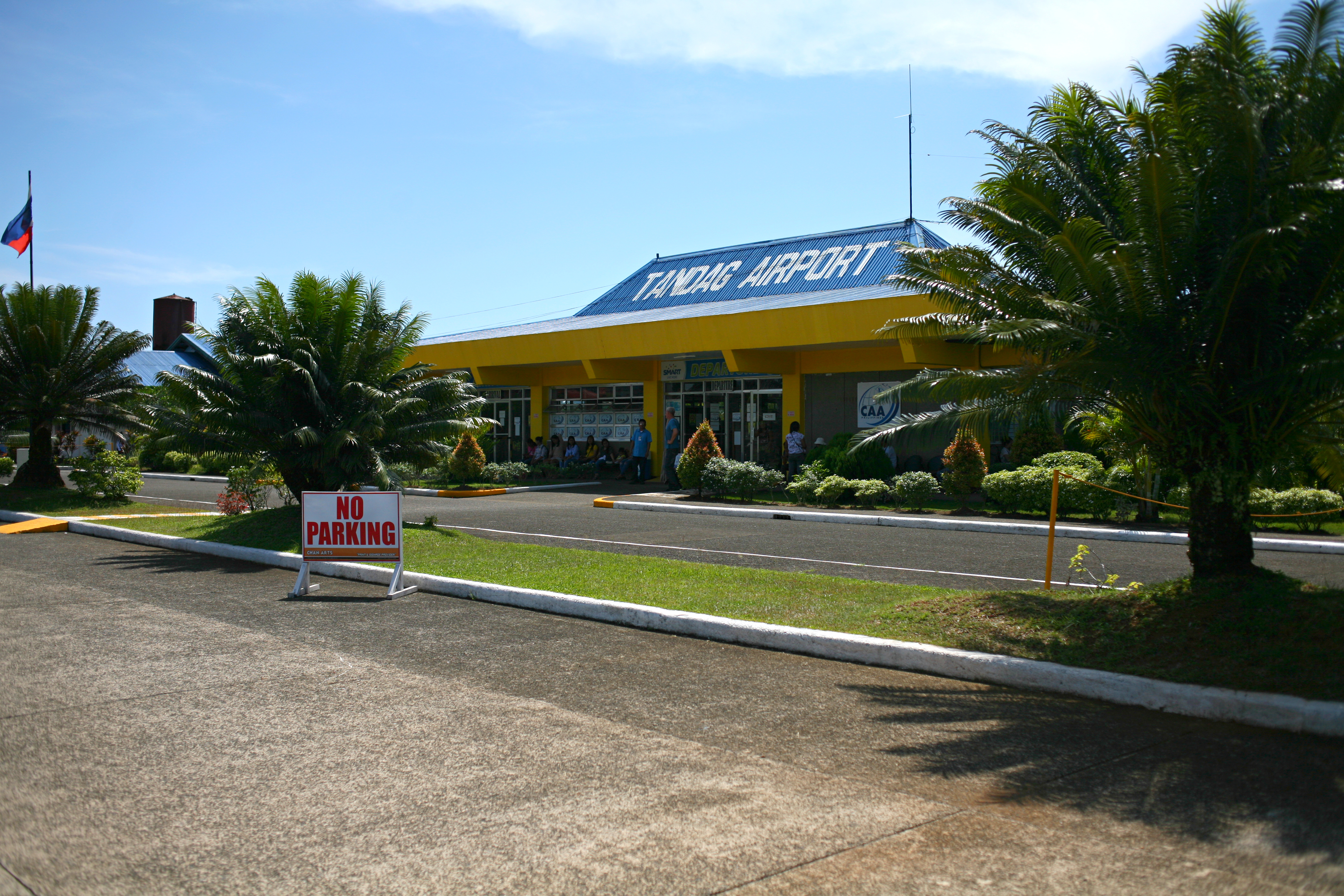
- IATA: TDG; ICAO: RPMW

Summary
- Airport type: Public
- Owner/Operator: Civil Aviation Authority of the Philippines
- Serves: Tandag
- Elevation AMSL: 5 m (16 ft)
- Coordinates: 09°04′19.60″N 126°10′17.20″E
- Interactive map of Tandag Airport

Runways
Direction	Length		Surface
Direction	m	ft	Surface
03/21	1,452	4,764	Concrete

Tandag Airport (IATA: TDG, ICAO: RPMW) is an airport serving the general area of Tandag, the capital city of Surigao del Sur in the Philippines. It is one of two airports in Surigao del Sur - the other being Bislig Airport. The airport is classified as a Class 2 principal (minor domestic) airport by the Civil Aviation Authority of the Philippines, a body of the Department of Transportation (DOTr) that is responsible for the operations of not only this airport but also of all other airports in the Philippines except the major international airports.

== History ==
On February 24, 2021, the DOTr planned to extend the runway to entice airlines to fly there. In 2024, the airport was included in a list of projects which were improved in Surigao del Sur. During the oath of office of the provincial officers of Surigao del Sur in Tandag, Representative Romeo Momo stated in his speech that the expansion of the airport will be a priority project.

=== CebGo Flights ===
Cebu Pacific was the sole airline that served Tandag Airport, with their thrice weekly Cebu-Tandag-Cebu flights, which were officially launched on June 29, 2014. It was operated by CebGo. The flights utilized an ATR 72-500, a 72-seater turboprop aircraft. However, on September 1, 2018, the airline announced that it would be discontinuing the route because of a declining demand throughout the years. Cebu Pacific then-President and CEO Lance Gokongwei declared in a press release, "We suppose that terminating our route in the Cebu-Tandag-Cebu sector was a sound decision as there was a considerable decrease in demand for air travel to that place."

== Terminal and facilities ==
When arriving to the airport, you walk to the terminal after the tarmac. Baggage claim areas are present in the airport. Many services in Tandag offer a shuttle service to the airport. The airport only has one terminal.

== See also ==
- List of airports in the Philippines
