= Mamburao Airport =

Airport in Occidental Mindoro, Philippines

Mamburao Airport Paliparan ng Mamburao
- IATA: MBO; ICAO: RPUM

Summary
- Airport type: Public
- Operator: Civil Aviation Authority of the Philippines
- Serves: Mamburao, Occidental Mindoro
- Elevation AMSL: 13 ft (4.0 m)
- Coordinates: 13°12′29″N 120°36′19″E

Runways
Direction	Length		Surface
Direction	m	ft	Surface
16/34	1,300	4,265	Asphalt

Mamburao Airport (Filipino: Paliparan ng Mamburao) (IATA: MBO, ICAO: RPUM) is an airport serving Mamburao, a municipality in and the capital of the province of Occidental Mindoro in the Philippines. It is one of three airports in Occidental Mindoro. The airport is classified as a community airport by the Civil Aviation Authority of the Philippines, the body of the Department of Transportation that is responsible for the operations of all airports in the Philippines except the major international airports. Air Juan is the only commercial airline the flies to this airport using its Cessna Caravan Seaplanes. It flies twice weekly Manila - Mamburao flights. After several months of operation, Air Juan ceased this route.

== Facilities ==
The airport resides at an elevation of 13 feet (4 m) above mean sea level. It has one runway designated 16/34 with an asphalt surface measuring 1,300 by 30 metres (4,265 ft × 98 ft).
