= San Jose Airport =

San Jose Airport may refer to:

- San Jose International Airport, an international airport in San Jose, California, United States
- Juan Santamaría International Airport, an international airport serving in San José, Costa Rica
- Los Cabos International Airport, an international airport in San José del Cabo, Mexico
- Evelio Javier Airport, a domestic airport in San Jose de Buenavista, Antique, Philippines
- San Jose Airport (Mindoro), a domestic airport in San Jose, Occidental Mindoro, Philippines
- San José Airport (Guatemala), an airport being constructed in Puerto San José, Guatemala

== See also ==
- Reid–Hillview Airport, a general aviation airport in San Jose, California, United States
