= Central Mindanao Airport =

Airport serving M'lang, Cotabato, Philippines

Central Mindanao Airport Hulugpaan sang Katunganan Mindanao Paliparan ng Gitnang Mindanao
- IATA: none; ICAO: none

Summary
- Airport type: Public
- Owner/Operator: Province of Cotabato
- Serves: M'lang and Kidapawan
- Location: M'lang, Cotabato, Philippines
- Coordinates: 06°54′42″N 124°55′27″E

Map
- Location in the Philippines

Central Mindanao Airport, (Note: Hiligaynon: Hulugpaan sang Katunganan Mindanao, Filipino: Paliparan ng Gitnang Mindanao) formerly North Cotabato Rural Airport and also known as the M'lang Airport, is an airport serving the general area of M'lang, located in the province of Cotabato in the Philippines. It is the only inland airport of Mindanao with capability for commercial flights. It occupies 62 hectares (150 acres) of lands with a 1.2 kilometres (3,900 ft)-long concrete runway and a terminal building. The airport is primarily intended to support the transport of agricultural produce from the central part of Mindanao.

== History ==
The Central Mindanao Airport was conceptualized by the Cotabato provincial government under then-Governor Emmanuel Piñol. In 2001, the national government appropriated for its funding of P2.895 million has been included in the national budget of the Philippines for fiscal year 2001.

The Cotabato provincial government acquired the 62 hectares (150 acres) of land in Barangay Tawantawan in 2003 from the heirs of Don Tomas Buenaflor for the airport project. The acquisition of the site was supported by President Gloria Macapagal Arroyo, Senators John Osmeña and Richard Gordon, and Congressmen Bernardo Piñol Jr., Jesus Sacdalan and Nancy Catamco. Construction of the airport began in 2004.

The construction of the airport's terminal building was completed under the administration of then-Governor Jesus Sacdalan with then-President Arroyo leading the inauguration rites of the facility in November 2009. However the airport's opening was mothballed during the administration of Sacdalan's successor Emmylou Mendoza, who cites the inability to transfer the airport to the Department of Transportation due to missing documents.

The airport was used for the first time in February 2016, when the provincial government of Cotabato secured consent from the Civil Aviation Authority of the Philippines (CAAP) to use the airport as a hub for a province-wide cloud seeding program to avert a drought.

Governor Catamco who became governor of Cotabato in 2019, asked for the intervention of President Rodrigo Duterte regarding the status of the Central Mindanao Airport. Duterte publicly expressed desire to make the airport operational and instructed Senator and close aide Bong Go to oversee the process, after the head of state was briefed on the airport's status during his visit in M'lang following in earthquake.

== Cost ==
Some P430 million was allocated for the construction of the airport.

=== Upgrading ===
In April 2024 seven airports across Mindanao were designated to receive P1.3 billion for new infrastructure development as part of the 2024 General Appropriations Law. Of this, P300 million was earmarked for Central Mindanao airport.

== See also ==
- List of airports in the Philippines
