= President Quirino =

President Quirino may refer to:

- Elpidio Quirino (1890–1956), 6th President of the Philippines
- President Quirino, Sultan Kudarat, a municipality in the Philippines
- President Quirino Avenue in Manila, Philippines

== See also ==
- Quirino (disambiguation)
