= Cesar Lim Rodriguez Airport =

Airport in Taytay, Palawan, Philippines

Cesar Lim Rodriguez Airport Hulugpaan sang Cesar Lim Rodriguez Paliparang Cesar Lim Rodriguez
- IATA: RZP; ICAO: RPSD

Summary
- Airport type: Public
- Owner/Operator: Province of Palawan
- Serves: Taytay
- Location: Sandoval, Taytay, Palawan
- Elevation AMSL: 24 m / 80 ft
- Coordinates: 11°03′06″N 119°31′06″E

Map
- Location in the Philippines

Runways
Direction	Length		Surface
Direction	m	ft	Surface
	1,100	3,610	Concrete

Cesar Lim Rodriguez Airport (Filipino: Paliparang Cesar Lim Rodriguez; Hiligaynon: Hulugpaan sang Cesar Lim Rodriguez; IATA: RZP, ICAO: RPSD), commonly known as Taytay Airport, (Note: The airport is also known as Sandoval Airport (named after the barangay where it is located) and Taytay–Sandoval Airport.) is an airport serving the general area of Taytay, located in the province of Palawan in the Philippines. The facility was named after Taytay native Cesar Lim Rodriguez, a former judge who donated part of his property for the airport.

The airport is owned by the province of Palawan. Recent interest in improving the infrastructure in this airport is due to its strategic location in the northern part of the Palawan mainland: the renowned beach resorts of the area (including El Nido and Apulit Island) and the historic town of Taytay are only 30 to 40 kilometers by road from the airport. In comparison, the only other airport capable of handling large aircraft is located in the provincial capital of Puerto Princesa, approximately 230 kilometers to the south.

In 2013, the Department of Transportation and Communications (DOTC) approved a ₱48.2-million budget for the airport's improvement, consisting of the concreting of a runway 1,100 meters long and 18 meters wide.

In February 2016, the Palawan Provincial Board approved a resolution to permit the semi-privatization of the airport through a public–private partnership (PPP). The DOTC allotted ₱8.8 million for the airport's development for the year 2016.

== Airlines and destinations ==
Airlines	Destinations
Air Juan	Puerto Princesa
