= Quirino (disambiguation) =

Quirino may refer to:

== People ==
- Quirino Armellini (1889–1975), Italian military officer
- Quirino Cristiani (1896–1984), Italian-born Argentine animation director and cartoonist
- Quirino Majorana (1871–1957), Italian experimental physicist
- Quirino Paulino Castillo, a Dominican on trial in New York on drug charges
- Andre Bambú Quirino (born 1979), Brazilian basketball player
- Carlos Quirino (1910–1999), Filipino historian
- Cory Quirino (born 1953), Filipino television host, author and beauty pageant titleholder
- Claudinei Quirino da Silva (born 1970), Brazilian sprinter
- Elpidio Quirino (1890-1956), former President of the Philippines
- Thiago Quirino da Silva (born 1985), Brazilian football player

== Places ==
=== Philippines ===
Municipalities

- Quirino, Ilocos Sur
- Quirino, Isabela
- President Quirino, Sultan Kudarat

Province

- Quirino, a province in the Philippines

Structures

- Quirino Airport
- Quirino State College
- Quirino station (LRT), a LRT Line 1 station in Manila
- Quirino station (MRT), an MRT Line 7 station in Quezon City
- Quirino Highway station, a Metro Manila Subway station in Quezon City
- Quirino Grandstand, Manila
- Quirino Stadium in Bantay, Ilocos Sur

=== Italy ===
- San Quirino, a commune in Pordenone
- Teatro Quirino, an opera house in Rome

== Roads ==
- Quirino Highway (Quezon City), a beltway from Quezon City to the province of Bulacan
- Quirino Avenue, a highway in central Manila
- Elpidio Quirino Avenue, a major road in southern Manila
