= Libmanan Airport =

Planned airport in Camarines Sur, Philippines

Libmanan Airport (Filipino: Paliparan ng Libmanan, Bikol: Palayugan nin Libmanan) is a planned airport that would serve the municipality of Libmanan and also the province of Camarines Sur in the Philippines.

== Project ==
The total cost of Proposed Libmanan Airport Development Project is around Php 7,236,633.60 based on the contract price that was approved by the Department of Transportation and Communications and the National Government of the Philippines. The Construction of the new airport may begin by this year after the winning bidder may announce by the Bids and Awards Committee (BAC) for Civil Aviation Projects under DOTC Development Project.

== See also ==
- List of airports in the Philippines
