= M'lang =

Municipality in Cotabato, Philippines

- Municipality
- Municipality of M'lang
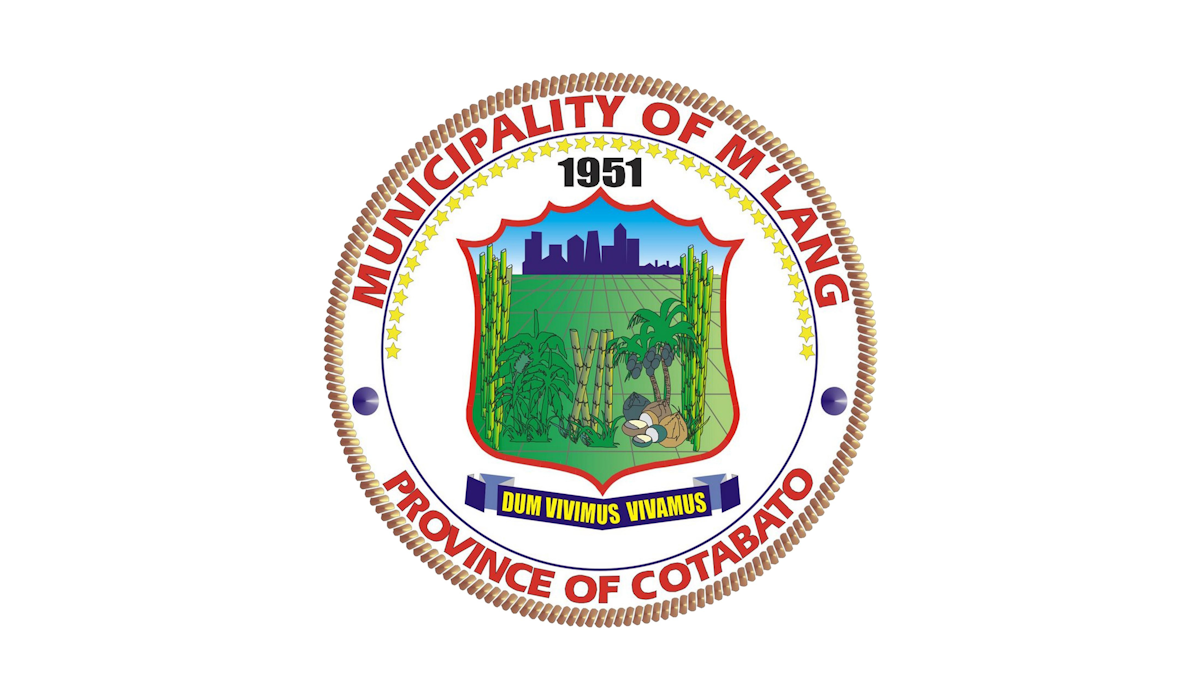
- Flag Seal
- Etymology: Tamlang (bamboo)
- Motto(s): Dum Vivimus Vivāmus (While We Live, Let Us Live)
- Map of Cotabato with M'lang highlighted
- Interactive map of M'lang
- Location within the Philippines
- Coordinates: 6°56′48″N 124°52′45″E
- Country: Philippines
- Region: Soccsksargen
- Province: Cotabato
- District: 3rd district
- Founded: August 3, 1951
- Barangays: 37 (see Barangays)

Government
  - Type: Sangguniang Bayan
  - Mayor: Russel M. Abonado
  - Vice Mayor: Joselito F. Piñol
  - Representative: Ma. Alana Samantha Taliño Santos

Area
  - Total: 312.13 km^{2} (120.51 sq mi)
- Elevation: 26 m (85 ft)
- Highest elevation: 70 m (230 ft)
- Lowest elevation: 10 m (33 ft)

Population (2024 census)
  - Total: 98,195
  - Density: 314.60/km^{2} (814.80/sq mi)
  - Households: 24,208

Economy
  - Income class: 1st municipal income class
  - Poverty incidence: 22.02% (2023)
  - Revenue: ₱ 238.4 million (2024)
  - Assets: ₱ 975.8 million (2024)
  - Expenditure: ₱ 183.3 million (2024)
  - Liabilities: ₱ 293.9 million (2024)

Service provider
  - Electricity: Cotabato Electric Cooperative (COTELCO)
- Time zone: UTC+8 (PST)
- ZIP code: 9402
- PSGC: 1204710000
- IDD : area code: +63 (0)64
- Native languages: Maguindanao; Hiligaynon; Cebuano; Ilianen; Tagalog
- Website: www.mlang.gov.ph

M'lang, officially the Municipality of M'lang (Hiligaynon: Banwa sang M'lang; Maguindanaon: Inged nu Melang, Jawi: ايڠايد نو ملڠ; Cebuano: Lungsod sa M'lang; Filipino: Bayan ng M'lang), is a municipality in the province of Cotabato, Philippines. According to the 2024 census, it has a population of 98,646 people.

== Etymology ==
The name M'lang was derived from a Maguindanaon word Tamlang/Tamelang which means "bamboo".

== History ==
In 1930s, migrants mostly from the islands of Panay and Negros in Western Visayas and some parts of Luzon settled in M'lang. Jacinto Paclibar, who was in search for more fertile lands and vast settlement was the first Christian who settled in M'lang. In the Second World War, he was appointed Chairman of the Civil Emergency Administration under the 118th Infantry Regiment of Wendell Fertig's 10th Military Division, assuming his position in M'lang. After the war ended, he was appointed as Deputy Governor of the undivided Cotabato until 1949. He had in mind a government assisted subdivision project so that landless settlers may have their share to utilize fertile lands for farming and settlement.

M'lang is one of the five daughter municipalities of Kidapawan. After the Second World War, in 1947, the municipal district of Kidapawan was converted into a municipality, with merging of then-forested M'lang-Tulunan area. This was due to the closeness of the Manobo with the Maguindanaons, along with the increase of Ilonggo settlers with relatives in the municipal districts into a then-mostly Maguindanaon territory.

M'lang was the first to separate from Kidapawan, being created as a regular municipality on August 3, 1951, by virtue of Executive Order (EO) No. 462, issued by President Elpidio Quirino. Domingo Lim, a former Kidapawan police chief, was appointed as mayor.

The municipality reduced its territory in 1961; first, through EO No. 441 when 28 barrios and sitios were separated to create Tulunan. With the establishment of M'lang and Tulunan, Kidapawan's direct access to the Ligawasan Marsh was cut off. Later that year, a portion of M'lang, along with parts of western Kidapawan and of Kabacan, were merged to from Matalam, through EO No. 461; thus, Kidapawan and Kabacan, neighbored since precolonial era, were cut off as well.

== Geography ==
=== Barangays ===
M'lang is politically subdivided into 37 Barangays. Each barangay consists of puroks while some have sitios.

- Poblacion A
- Poblacion B
- Bagontapay
- Bialong
- Buayan
- Calunasan
- Dalipe
- Dugong
- Dungo-an
- Gaunan
- Inas
- Katipunan
- La Fortuna
- La Suerte
- Langkong
- Lepaga
- Liboo
- Lika
- Luz Village
- Magallon
- Malayan
- New Antique
- New Barbaza
- New Kalibo
- New Consolacion
- New Esperanza
- New Janiuay
- New Lawa-an
- New Rizal
- Nueva Vida
- Pag-asa
- Pulang-lupa
- Sangat
- Tawantawan
- Tibao
- Ugpay
- Palma-Perez

=== Climate ===
Climate data for M'lang, Cotabato
Month	Jan	Feb	Mar	Apr	May	Jun	Jul	Aug	Sep	Oct	Nov	Dec	Year
Mean daily maximum °C (°F)	31 (88)	32 (90)	33 (91)	33 (91)	32 (90)	31 (88)	30 (86)	31 (88)	31 (88)	31 (88)	31 (88)	31 (88)	31 (89)
Mean daily minimum °C (°F)	21 (70)	21 (70)	21 (70)	22 (72)	23 (73)	23 (73)	23 (73)	23 (73)	23 (73)	23 (73)	23 (73)	22 (72)	22 (72)
Average precipitation mm (inches)	19 (0.7)	14 (0.6)	15 (0.6)	18 (0.7)	33 (1.3)	42 (1.7)	44 (1.7)	42 (1.7)	30 (1.2)	31 (1.2)	28 (1.1)	17 (0.7)	333 (13.2)
Average rainy days	6.9	5.6	6.9	8.1	15.1	17.5	17.8	18.5	14.9	14.9	12.4	8.0	146.6
Source: Meteoblue (modeled/calculated data, not measured locally)

== Demographics ==
Population census of M'lang
Year	Pop.	±% p.a.
1960	42,085	—
1970	44,844	+0.64%
1975	51,596	+2.85%
1980	57,059	+2.03%
1990	68,971	+1.91%
1995	71,846	+0.77%
2000	78,170	+1.82%
2007	86,321	+1.38%
2010	87,749	+0.60%
2015	95,070	+1.54%
2020	98,195	+0.68%
2024	98,646	+0.11%
Source: Philippine Statistics Authority

In the 2024 census, the population of M'lang was 98,646 people, with a density of 320 inhabitants per square kilometre or 830 inhabitants per square mile.

== Economy ==
Poverty incidence of M'lang (%)

Source: Philippine Statistics Authority

== Transportation ==
The Central Mindanao Airport, in Barangay Tawan-tawan, is intended to serve as the primary air transport hub for agricultural produce of Cotabato and those coming from central Mindanao. It has a 1.2 kilometer runway with a capability for commercial flights, but there are no scheduled flights. Central Mindanao project is designed to provide capacity of 3.5 million passengers p/a.

== Notable personalities ==
- Emmanuel Piñol – Chairman of Mindanao Development Authority, 2019-2021; Secretary of Agriculture, 2016-2019; Governor of Cotabato, 1998-2007

== Education ==
- Romeo Rodrigo Sr. Memorial Colleges, Inc. (Formerly St. Luke's College of Arts and Sciences)
- Notre Dame of M'lang
- Bialong Elementary School
- Mlang Pilot Elementary School
- Mlang National High School
- Southern Baptist College
- Mariano Untal Memorial High School (Bagontapay National High School)
- Bagontapay Central Elementary School
- Buayan Elementary School
- New Barbaza Elementary School
- Magallon Elementary School
- Lepaga Elementary School
- Lika National High School
- La Fortuna Elementary School
- Dugong Elementary School
- Sangat Elementary School
- Dalipe Elementary School
- New Rizal National High School
- Nueva Vida National High School
- Katipunan Elementary High School
- Katipunan National High School
- Don Tomas Buenaflor Elementary School
- Malayan Elementary School
