= Guimaras Airstrip =

Guimaras Airstrip Hulugpaan sang Guimaras Paliparan ng Guimaras
- IATA: none; ICAO: none

Summary
- Owner/Operator: Provincial Government of Guimaras
- Serves: Buenavista, Guimaras, Philippines
- Location: Brgy. McLain
- Coordinates: 10°41′46″N 122°40′5″E
- Interactive map of Guimaras Airstrip

Runways
Direction	Length		Surface
Direction	m	ft	Surface
	3,000	9,842	Concrete (partial), Gravel
- Sources: Aerial image of Guimaras Airstrip at WikiMapia

McLain Airstrip, also known as Guimaras Airstrip or Guimaras Airport (Filipino: Paliparan ng Guimaras, Hiligaynon: Hulugpaan sang Guimaras), is an airstrip located at Brgy. McLain, Buenavista, Guimaras. Envisioned as the future unified international airport for the cities of Iloilo and Bacolod by former Guimaras Gov. Emily R. Lopez. However, the project was mothballed due to the opening of the international airports in Cabatuan, Iloilo, and Silay, Negros Occidental, serving their respective cities. The project lost momentum when Governor Lopez retired from politics in 2004.

== Current Use ==
Last April 17, 2013, the airport was opened to serve as a campus of the Philippine State College of Aeronautics (PhilSCA), in partnership with Guimaras State College and the Provincial Government of Guimaras. A memorandum was signed with the Lopez Family, owners of the land where the airport situated, represented by industrialist Oscar Lopez, for public use of the airport. PhilSCA will be tasked with renovating and completing the aerodrome facilities of the airport.

== Commercial Flight ==
According to former Guimaras Gov. Felipe Hilan Nava, the airport is being planned for seasonal or limited regular commercial operations to boost the tourism industry of the province.
