= Dolores Airport (Philippines) =

- IATA: none; ICAO: RPVX

Summary
- Serves: Dolores, Eastern Samar
- Location: Eastern Samar

Dolores Airport, also known as Picardo Airport, is an abandoned airport located in Dolores, Eastern Samar. It was built as a military airfield for joint United States and Philippine Commonwealth military forces during World War II, alongside Guiuan Airport.
