= Evelio B. Javier Airport =

Airport in Antique, Philippines

Evelio B. Javier Airport Hurugpaan kang Evelio B. Javier Hulugpaan sang Evelio B. Javier Paliparan ng Evelio B. Javier
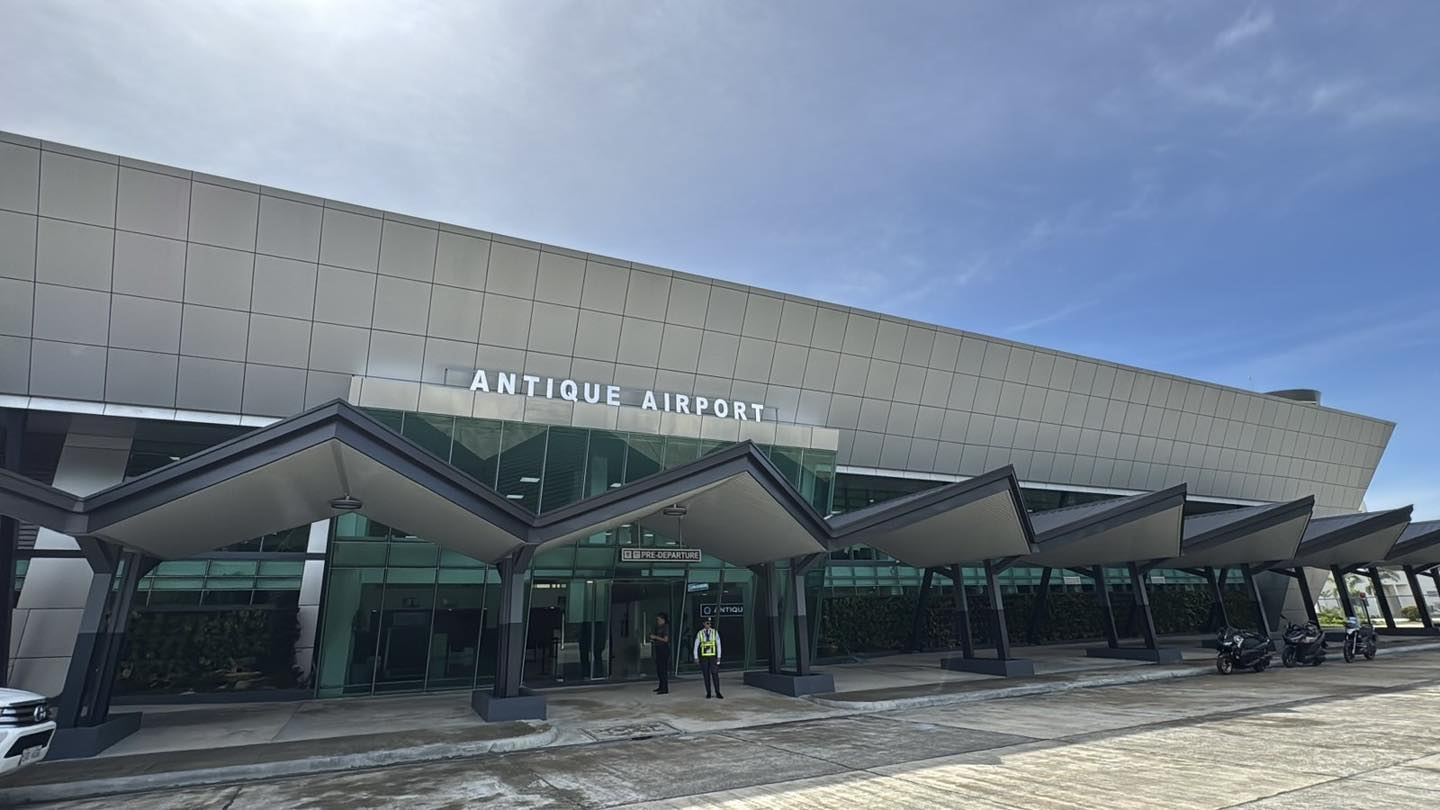
- IATA: EUQ; ICAO: RPVS

Summary
- Airport type: Public
- Owner/Operator: Civil Aviation Authority of the Philippines
- Serves: San Jose de Buenavista
- Location: San Jose de Buenavista, Antique
- Elevation AMSL: 7 m / 23 ft
- Coordinates: 10°45′57″N 121°56′00″E
- Interactive map of Evelio B. Javier Airport

Runways
Direction	Length		Surface
Direction	m	ft	Surface
18/36	1,800	3,937	Composite

Statistics (2021)
- Passengers: None
- Aircraft movements: None
- Cargo (in kgs): None
- Source: CAAP

Evelio B. Javier Airport (IATA: EUQ, ICAO: RPVS), also known as San Jose Airport and officially as Antique Airport, is an airport serving San Jose de Buenavista and the province of Antique in the Philippines. It is the only airport in Antique province.

The airport is located in the provincial capital San Jose de Buenavista, and is classified as a Class 2 principal (minor domestic) airport by the Civil Aviation Authority of the Philippines, a body of the Department of Transportation that is responsible for the operations of not only this airport but also of all other airports in the Philippines except the major international airports.

== History ==
The airport is named after Evelio Javier, a Marcos-critic politician who served as Antique's governor from 1971 to 1980 and was assassinated on February 11, 1986, just two weeks before the People Power Revolution. It was first renovated with the help of Senator Loren Legarda and Antique Governor Rhodora Cadiao. The Airport Terminal Building and other Facilities is being planned for reconstruction to accommodate more passengers and planes. Prior to the renovation, the airport was not operational due to a lack of passengers travelling from Antique to Manila.

Another renovation was made with the help of Senator Loren Legarda with the support by President Bongbong Marcos during his visit to Antique. He allocated P500m for the renovation for the airport, which the CAAP accepted. The renovation included extending the runway. He also planned an inauguration for the airport with him and Legarda.

== Terminals and facilities ==
The airport has one terminal. The runway has a length of 1,800 metres (2,000 yards) which used to be 1,700 m (1,900 yd) in 2023 and 1,200 m (1,300 yd) in 2016, when the runway as first built. On February 21, 2025, Legarda planned a terminal to open soon. A control tower and a fire house was also planned.

== See also ==
- List of airports in the Philippines
