= Quirino Airport =

Planned airport to serve the whole province of Quirino, the Philippines

Quirino Airport (Filipino: Paliparan ng Quirino, Ilokano: Pagtayaban ti Quirino) is a planned airport that would serve the whole province of Quirino, in the municipality of Maddela, the Philippines.

== Project ==
The total cost of Proposed Quirino Airport Development Project is around Php7,111,742.40 base on the contract price that was approved by the Department of Transportation and Communications and the National Government of the Philippines. The Construction of the new airport may start by this year after the winning bidder may announce by the Bids and Awards Committee (BAC) for Civil Aviation Projects under DOTC Development Project.

== See also ==
- List of airports in the Philippines
