= Air Juan =

Airline of the Philippines

IATA	ICAO	Call sign
AO	—	—
- Founded: 2012; 14 years ago
- Commenced operations: 2016; 10 years ago
- AOC #: 2013053
- Operating bases: Cebu; Manila; Puerto Princesa
- Fleet size: 12
- Destinations: 3
- Headquarters: Bonifacio Global City, Taguig

Air Juan Aviation, Inc., operating as Air Juan, is a registered scheduled and non-scheduled domestic airline operating in the Philippines with bases in Manila, Puerto Princesa and Cebu. It is the first commercial seaplane operator in the Philippines.

Air Juan is also the only airline company that offers flights to and from Manila outside the heavily congested Ninoy Aquino International Airport as all its seaplane flights arrive and depart from the Air Juan Seaplane Terminal located within the Cultural Center of the Philippines Complex in Pasay, Metro Manila. Aside from its seaplane operations, the company also has in its fleet helicopters, business jets, and propeller planes for commuter air services in Palawan, Caticlan, and Iloilo.

== History ==
Air Juan started operating private charter services in 2012, and scheduled flight services from Puerto Princesa to Cuyo Island, Coron, and Caticlan in 2016. Most recently, Air Juan started operating scheduled seaplane services from Manila to Puerto Galera, Subic, Busuanga Bay, and Boracay without passing through domestic airports as the aircraft flies its passengers directly to the hotels or resorts.

=== Closure and revival ===
Air Juan ceased operations sometime around 2020 as a result of the COVID-19 pandemic, however there is no info yet on the exact date they closed down. Their website shut down and redirected to another site. During March 2023, however, a Philippine news site reported that Air Juan will resume flights from Mactan to Bantayan sometime around March. It also looks like that they resumed charter operations as shown in a Facebook post dated April 24, 2023.

== Expansion ==
In 2017, Air Juan announced that it is expanding its seaplane operations and will soon offer flights from Manila to Marinduque, Baler, and Balesin Island resort, though it is uncertain whether it will be a regularly scheduled flight or just through charters. Its Palawan operations have expanded to include Iloilo and Caticlan services from Cuyo Island. In June 2017, Air Juan started operating land planes out of Mactan–Cebu International Airport offering services to Tagbilaran City of Bohol, Siquijor, Biliran, Maasin, Sipalay, and Bantayan Island. In March 2018, Air Juan began commercial flights between Cebu City and Catbalogan City, Samar's capital.

Cebu

In Cebu, the seaplane base has been set up within Pond F of SRP (South Road Properties).

At the start of 2018, the seaplane service starts operating from Cebu.

== Fleet ==
Air Juan is the first Philippine carrier to operate a multi-aircraft system as well as seaplanes that allows the airline to offer a wide range of services from business to commuter purposes. The airline operates the following aircraft as of 2017:

Fixed wing aircraft:

Cessna Grand Caravan

- EX
- Amphibian
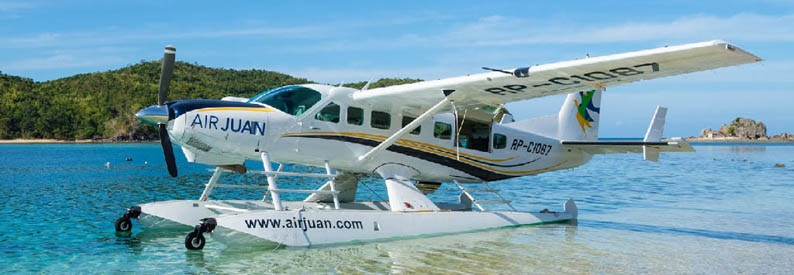
  Air Juan Cessna Grand Caravan Amphibian

Helicopters:

- Bell 429
- Bell 407

== Sources ==
- Manila Bulletin, Bernie Cahiles-Magkilat (6 February 2017). "Seaplanes operator aggressively connecting the islands". Archived from the original on 21 January 2018.
- MyCebu.ph, Marlen Limpag (21 January 2018). "Air Juan to start flights soon from seaplane terminal in SRP, Cebu City".
- Philippines Magazine (21 January 2018). "Air Juan opens SRP terminal for seaplace services". Archived from the original on 21 January 2018.
- The Freeman, Jean Marvette A. Demecillo (30 May 2017). "Building of seaplane dock in SRP to begin soon". Archived from the original on 12 June 2017.
- The Freeman, Jean Marvette A. Demecillo (21 January 2018). "Seaplane service at SRP starts operation". The Philippine STAR. Archived from the original on 21 January 2018.
