= Civil Aviation Authority of the Philippines =

Civil aviation regulator in the Philippines

- Pangasiwaan sa Abyasyong Sibil ng Pilipinas
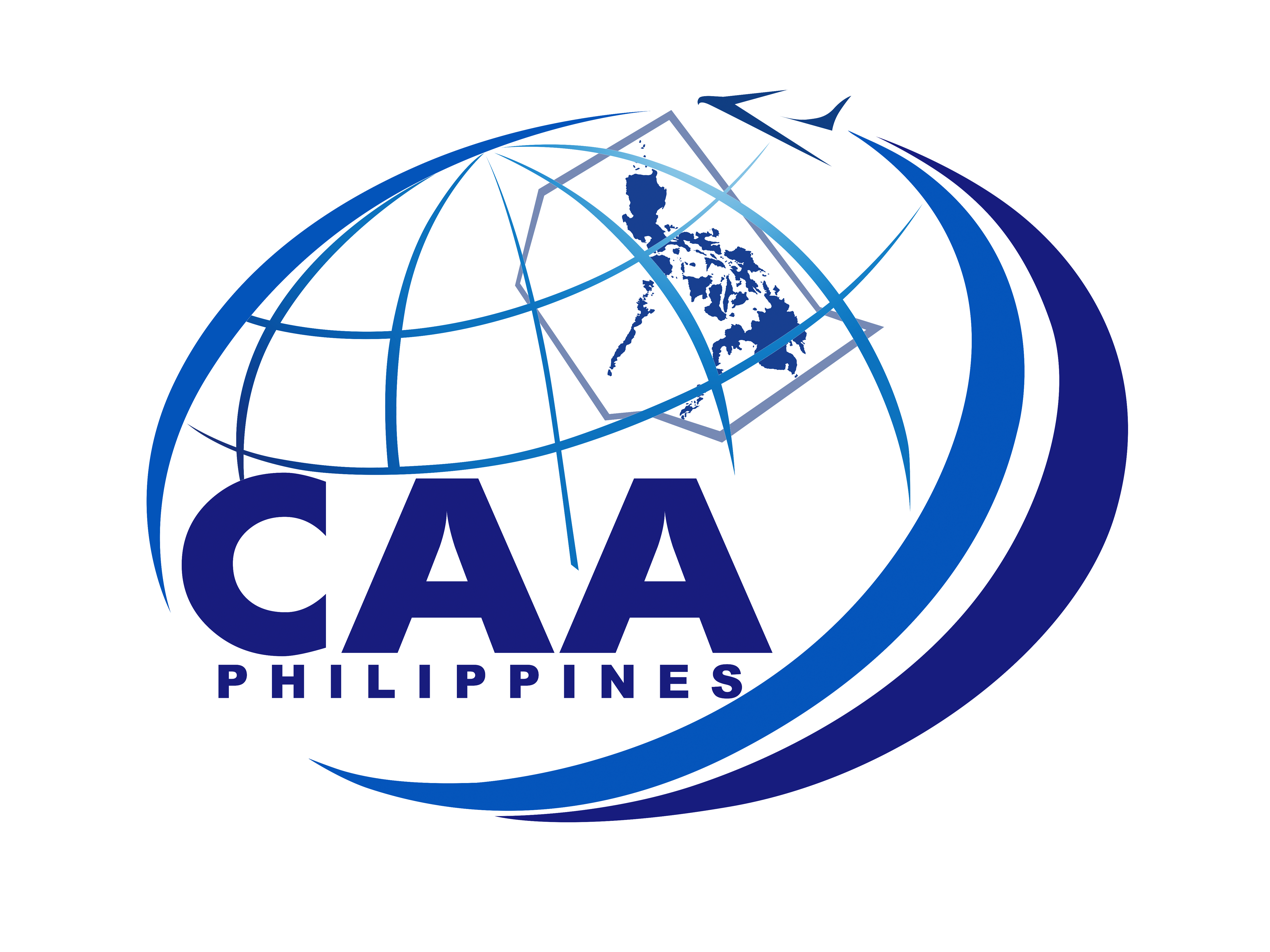
- Emblem of the government agency

Agency overview
- Formed: November 20, 1931; 94 years ago (as Office Technical Assistant of Aviation Matters); March 23, 2008; 18 years ago (as Civil Aviation Authority of the Philippines)
- Preceding agency: Air Transportation Office
- Headquarters: NAIA Road, Pasay, Metro Manila
- Agency executive: Lt. Gen. Raul L. Del Rosario, PAF (Ret.), Director General
- Parent department: Department of Transportation
- Website: www.caap.gov.ph

The Civil Aviation Authority of the Philippines (CAAP, Tagalog pronunciation: [ˈkaʔap]; Filipino: Pangasiwaan sa Abyasyong Sibil ng Pilipinas), formerly known as the Air Transportation Office, is the civil aviation authority of the Philippines under the Department of Transportation.

Responsible for implementing policies on civil aviation to ensure safe, economical, and efficient air travel, and investigates aviation accidents through its Aircraft Accident Investigation and Inquiry Board.

== History ==
Legislative Act No. 3909, passed by the Congress of the Philippines on November 20, 1931, created an office under the Department of Commerce and Communications to handle aviation matters, particularly the enforcement of rules and regulations governing commercial aviation as well as private flying. It was amended by Act 3996 to include licensing of airmen and aircraft, inspection of aircraft concerning air traffic rules, schedules and rates and enforcement of aviation laws.

From 1932 to 1936, there were no standard procedures as to the licensing of airmen, registration of aircraft and recording of various aeronautical activities connected with commercial aviation. There were attempts made to register planes and their owners without ascertaining their airworthiness and to record names of pilots, aviator mechanics and other details.

In 1933, the office of Technical Assistant of Aviation matters was enlarged into the Aeronautics Division under the Department of Commerce and Industry, the functions of which were embodied in Administrative Order No. 309, a joint bulletin issued by the Department of Public Works and Communications and the Department of Finance.

In October 1934, Act No. 4033 was passed to require a franchise from the Philippine government in order to operate an air service and to regulate foreign aircraft operations.

On November 12, 1936, the Congress of the Philippines passed Commonwealth Act No. 168, or the Civil Aviation Law of the Philippines, which created the Bureau of Aeronautics. After the liberation of the Philippines in March 1945, the bureau was reorganized and placed under the Department of National Defense. Among its functions was to promulgate civil aviation regulations.

In October 1947, Executive Order No. 94, which reorganized the government, transferred the Bureau of Aeronautics to the newly created Department of Commerce and Industry and renamed the bureau as the Civil Aeronautics Administration (CAA).

On June 5, 1948, Republic Act No. 224 created the National Airports Corporation which was charged with the management and operations of all national airports.

On June 20, 1952, Republic Act No. 776, otherwise known as the Civil Aeronautics Act of the Philippines, reorganized the Civil Aeronautics Board and the Civil Aeronautics Administration. It defined the powers and duties of both agencies including the funds, personnel and the regulations of civil aviation.

On January 20, 1975, Letter of Instruction No. 244 transferred to the Department of Public Highways the responsibilities relative to airport plans, designs, construction, improvement, maintenance as well as site acquisition. The responsibilities related to location, planning design and funding were later returned to the CAA.

On July 23, 1979, under Executive Order No. 546, the CAA was renamed the Bureau of Air Transportation (BAT) and placed under the Ministry of Transportation and Communications.

On April 13, 1987, Executive Order No. 125-A renamed the Bureau of Air Transportation the Air Transportation Office headed by the assistant secretary of air transportation.

On March 4, 2008, Republic Act No. 9497, also known as the Civil Aviation Authority Act of 2008, was signed into law replacing the Air Transportation Office with the Civil Aviation Authority, an independent regulatory body with quasi-judicial and quasi-legislative powers with corporate attributes

== Divisions ==
CAAP Organizational Structure

Board of Directors
Office of the Corporate Board Secretary
Director General
2 Deputy Directors General
Special Corporate Staff Group
Technical Executive Staff Group
Directorate for Flight Standards Inspectorate Service
Aircraft Accident Investigation & Inquiry Board
Aviation Administrative Service Group	Aviation Operations Service Group
Aerodrome Area Group

The Aircraft Accident and Inquiry Investigation Board (AAIIB), a division of the CAA, is the air accident investigation authority of the Philippines.

== Controversies ==
On January 17, 2008, the United States Federal Aviation Administration (FAA) downgraded the Philippines' rating to Category 2 from Category 1, since its Air Transportation Office (Philippines; ATO) did not fully satisfy international safety standards. Consequently, Philippine Airlines (PAL) president Jaime Bautista stated that its 2008 growth targets would be lowered. After emerging from eight years of receivership the previous year, PAL was prevented by the FAA decision from increasing US flights from 33 per week. President Gloria Macapagal-Arroyo dismissed acting Air Transportation Office chief Danilo Dimagiba after the downgrade and designated Department of Transportation and Communications secretary Leandro Mendoza as concurrent officer in charge of ATO. In addition, the Embassy of the United States in Manila warned US citizens in the Philippines "to refrain from using Philippine-based carriers due to 'serious concerns' about the ATO's alleged mishandling of the aviation industry." Dimagiba blamed lack of funds for the FAA downgrade, alleging that ATO needs ₱1 billion ($1 = Php 40), roughly around $25,000,000.

Effective April 1, 2010, the European Union, following the FAA's lead, banned Philippine carriers from flying to Europe. EU ambassador Alistair MacDonald said: 'The commission considers that the supervisory authority is currently not able to implement and enforce the relevant safety standards, and decided therefore to ban from EU airspace all air carriers licensed in the Philippines until these deficiencies are corrected.'"

On June 19, 2010, important navigation equipment at the Manila airport maintained by CAAP suffered technical problems. The VHF omnidirectional range (VOR) used by aircraft for navigating to and from the airport stopped working due to heavy rain and there was no available replacement. One had to be brought from another airport.

On April 10, 2014, the US FAA upgraded the Philippines' rating to Category 1 from Category 2. On June 25, 2015, the EU also lifted its ban on Philippine carriers flying to Europe.

== See also ==
- List of civil aviation authorities
- List of airports in the Philippines
