= Daraga Church =

Roman Catholic church in Albay, Philippines

- Our Lady of the Gate Parish Church
- Nuestra Señora de la Porteria Parish Church; Iglesia Parroquial de Nuestra Señora de la Portería (Spanish)
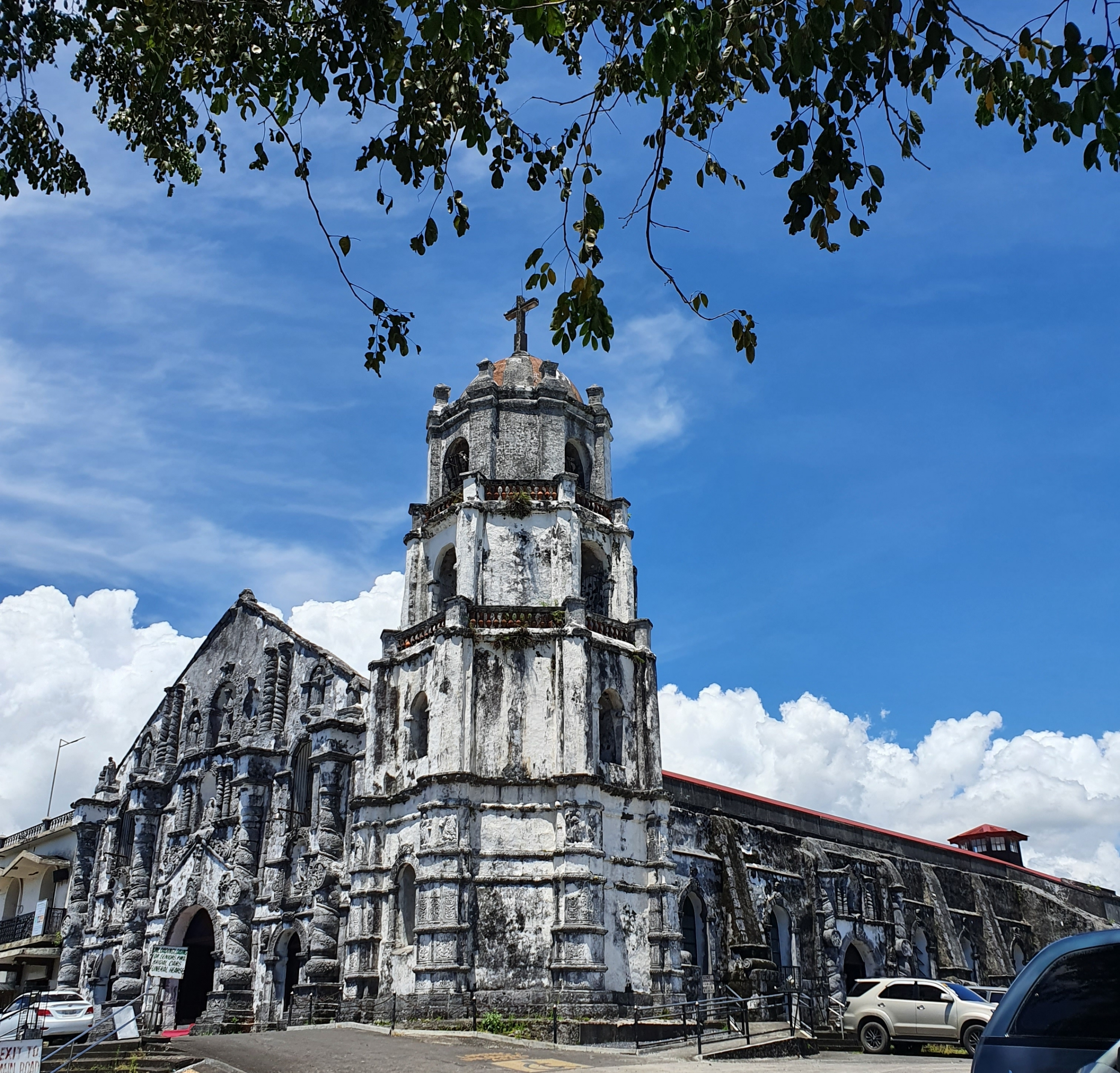
- Church façade in 2022

- Location in Albay Location in Luzon Location in the Philippines
- 13°08′59″N 123°42′43″E
- Location: Daraga, Albay
- Country: Philippines
- Denomination: Roman Catholic

History
- Status: Parish church
- Dedication: Our Lady of the Gate
- Dedicated: 1854

Architecture
- Functional status: Active
- Heritage designation: National Cultural Treasure
- Designated: 2007
- Architectural type: Church building
- Style: Churrigueresque Baroque
- Completed: 1773

Specifications
- Materials: Volcanic rocks

Administration
- Province: Caceres
- Diocese: Legazpi
- Deanery: St. Gregory the Great
- Parish: Our Lady of the Gate

Clergy
- Priest: Fr. Antonio S. Sial

Our Lady of the Gate Parish Church, also known as Nuestra Señora de la Porteria Parish Church and commonly known as Daraga Church, is a Roman Catholic church in the municipality of Daraga, Albay, Philippines under the jurisdiction of the Diocese of Legazpi. The church was built by the Franciscans in 1772 under the patronage of the Our Lady of the Gate. Certain church sections were declared as a National Cultural Treasure of the Philippines in 2007.

== History ==
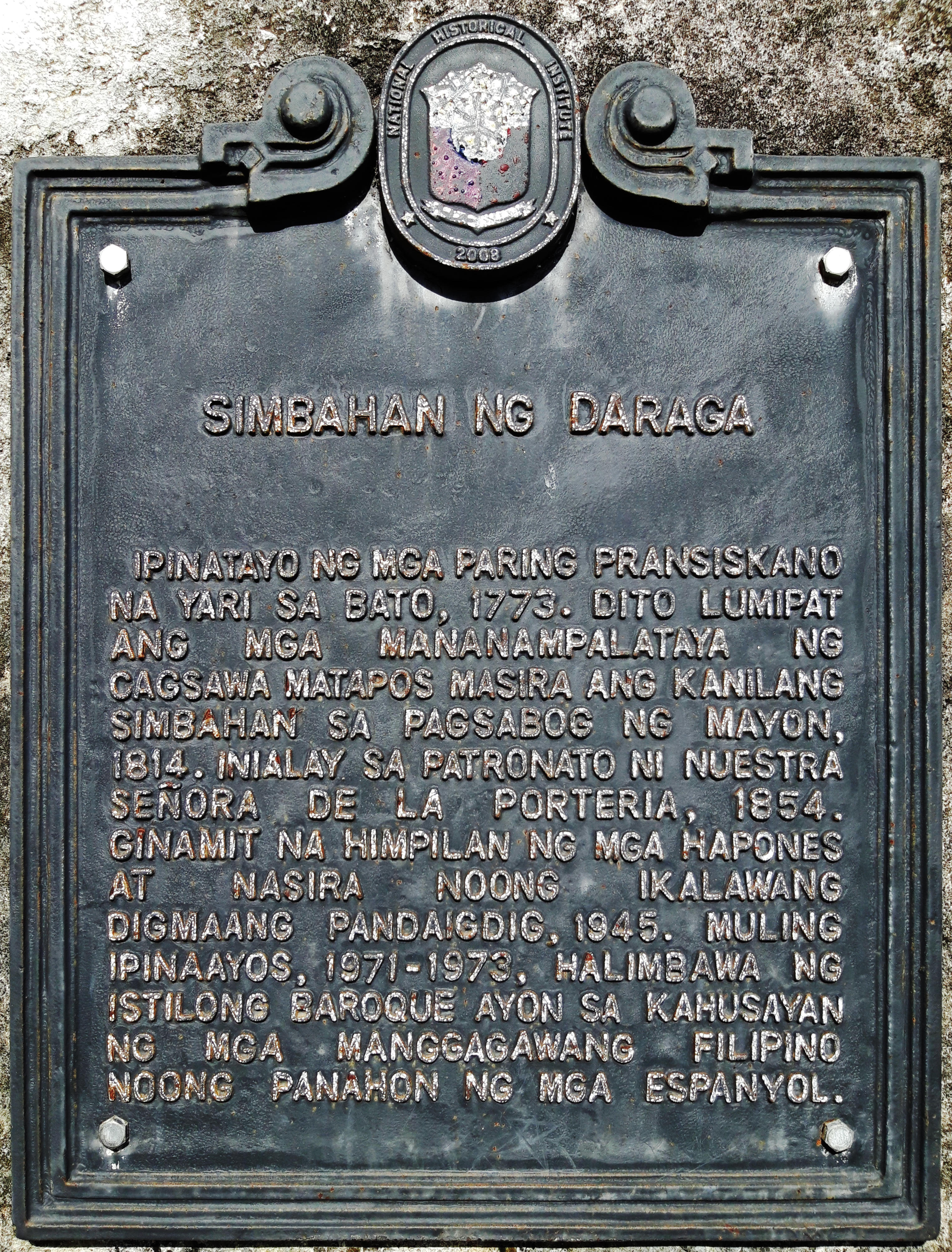
Church NHI historical marker installed in 2008

Daraga was established as a settlement by people relocating from Cagsawa, who feared another eruption of the Mayon Volcano in that region. They requested permission from the Spanish government to establish a new community and church south of Cagsawa. Their request was granted by Governor-General Simon de Salazar through a communication to the alcalde mayor of the province of Camarines, dated June 12, 1772.

The present church of Daraga was built under the Franciscan priests in 1773. Built at the time that Daraga was a visita of Cagsawa, the church was erected atop a hill in barangay Santa Maria overlooking the Mayon Volcano. When the Mayon Volcano erupted on February 1, 1814, the residents of Cagsawa transferred to Daraga after the destruction of their church. It was a common belief, however, that the church of Daraga was built after the eruption of Mayon and that it replaced the church of Cagsawa. The church was consecrated to Our Lady of the Gate in 1854.

The church was heavily damaged by joint American and Filipino military bombers during the Second World War in 1945, and was hastily renovated after the war using a mix of Renaissance Gothic and Mexican Baroque styles. The church was redesigned to follow the norms of the Vatican II council from 1971 to 1973. In 1991, the altar was returned to its original position. The church is still undergoing preservation and rehabilitation measures to prevent deterioration.

The National Historical Institute (now National Historical Commission of the Philippines) unveiled the church's historical marker on October 16, 2008. The National Museum of the Philippines listed the church's eastern and western façade, belfry, and baptistry as a National Cultural Treasure in 2007.

Priests of Nuestra Señora de la Porteria Parish Church, Daraga, Albay
Parish Priest	Inclusive Dates
Fr. Francisco Aragonés, OFM	1814-1850
Fr, Vicente de Lillo, OFM	1851-1868
Fr. Santos Merryon, OFM	1868-1891, 1892-1897
Fr. Julián Torribio, OFM	1891-1892
Fr. Juan Calleja, OFM	1897-1898
Fr. Roque Ricafón, OFM	1898-1899
Fr. Damasco Calvo, OFM	1899-1904
Fr. Vicente de Rojo, OFM	1904-1931
Fr. Nabor del Pozo, OFM	1931-1933
Fr. Salvador Rodríguez, OFM	1933-1939
Fr. Florentín Pérez, OFM	1940-1954
Fr. Victorino Caballero, OFM	1954-1957
Fr. Silvestre Murillo, OFM	1957-1959
Fr. Mariano Montero, OFM	1960-1965, 1966-1970
Fr. Antonio Luto, OFM	1965-1966
Fr. Servulo San Martín, OFM	1970-1975
Fr. Eliakim Suela, OFM	1975-1976
Fr. Francisco Huab, OFM	1980-1983
Fr. Honesto Moraleda	1983-1988
Fr. Domingo Baybay	1988-1989
Fr. Felino Paulino	1989-1992
Fr. Josefino Templado	1992-1998
Fr. Noe Thomas	1998-2005
Fr. José Victor Lobrigo	2005–2012
Fr. Ricardo B. Barquez, Jr.	2012-2017
Fr. Eulogio P. Lawenko, Jr.	2017-2022
Fr. Antonio S. Sial	2022-present
Source: Nuestra Señora de la Porteria Parish Church

== Features ==
Church façade details

=== Façade ===
The church is known for its Churrigueresque architectural style in its façade, a fine example of Baroque architecture. The façade and its walls are made out of volcanic rocks, which are rich in the area. The current white façade is the result of a coating of lime for protection from deterioration. The façade also employs Mexican Baroque in its detailed ornamentation.

It is one of the few churches in the country that has four spiral columns known as Solomonic columns or salomónicas. The four columns bear round medallions, each with carved images of the four Evangelists. Another characteristic of the façade, which is unique to the church, is the absence of either vertical columns or horizontal cornices. Engraved on the façade and the adjacent belfry are statues of saints, mostly Franciscans, and rare religious seals such as the coats of arms of the Franciscan order, the Pope's tiara with the keys, and the five wounds or stigmata of St. Francis which survived the Second World War.

The arch over the entrance has an inscription in Latin which reads, "Bene fundata est domus Domini supra firmam petram" (Well founded is the house of the Lord on firm rock). Symbols carved out of stones of the three theological virtues (hope, faith, charity) and the Eucharist are also engraved.

=== Belfry ===
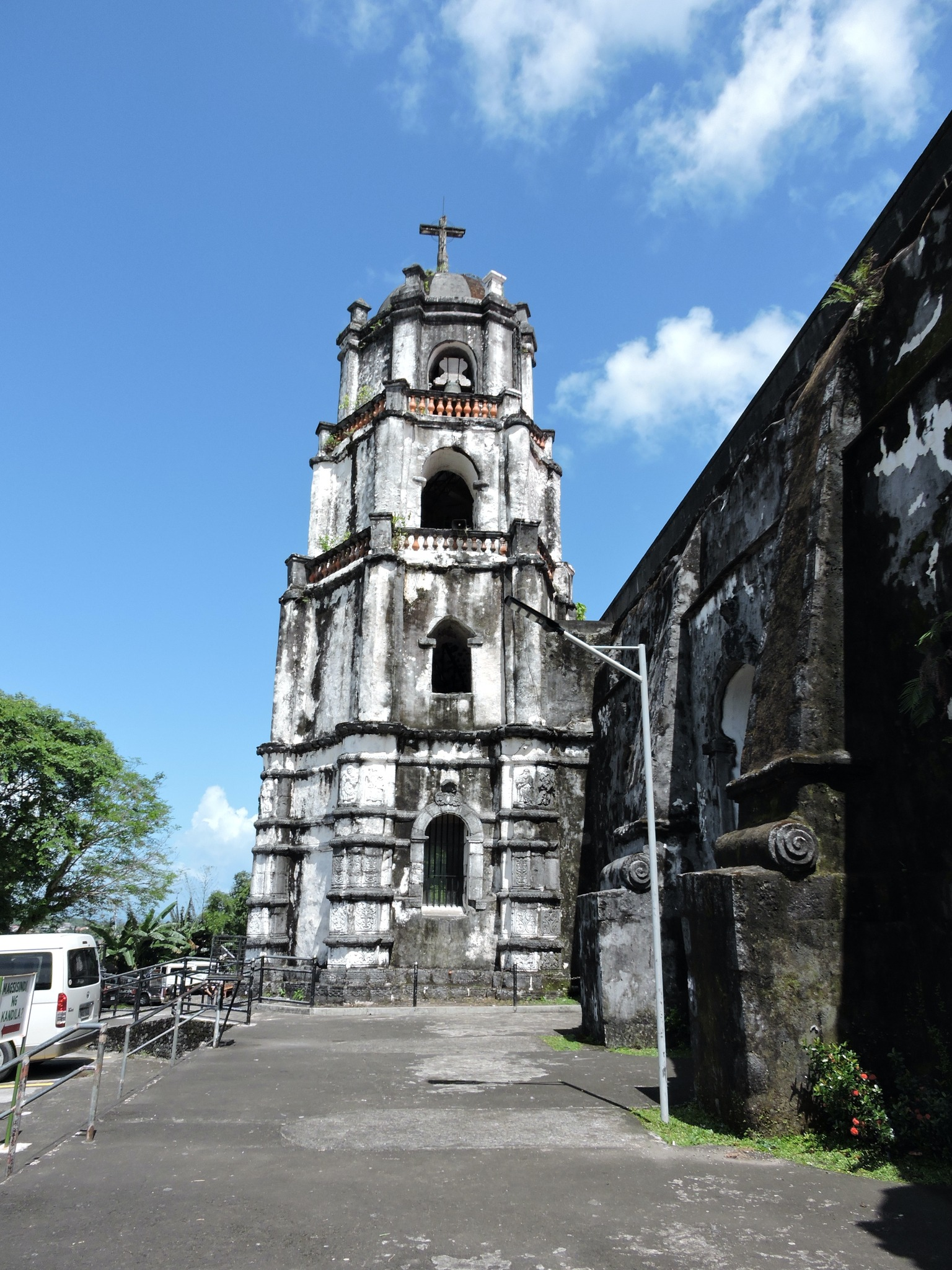
Church belfry

The octagonal belltower, located on the left side of the church, has carved images of the twelve apostles distributed in the base's six faces. The tower has four levels, each tapered upwards and topped with a dome and cross.

== Rehabilitation ==
Due to several repairs and renovations done on the church from the past years in the absence of renovation plans, certain parts of the church have been altered and have lost their significance. The façade has been plastered but the original stone work has been revealed through time. With the help of government agencies like the National Historical Commission of the Philippines and the National Commission for Culture and the Arts, the church is undergoing rehabilitation works to preserve the church's cultural and historical significance. The Provincial Government of Albay led by Governor Joey Salceda allotted ₱ 35 million for the rehabilitation of certain historical and cultural heritage sites in the province including the church of Daraga.

== Gallery ==
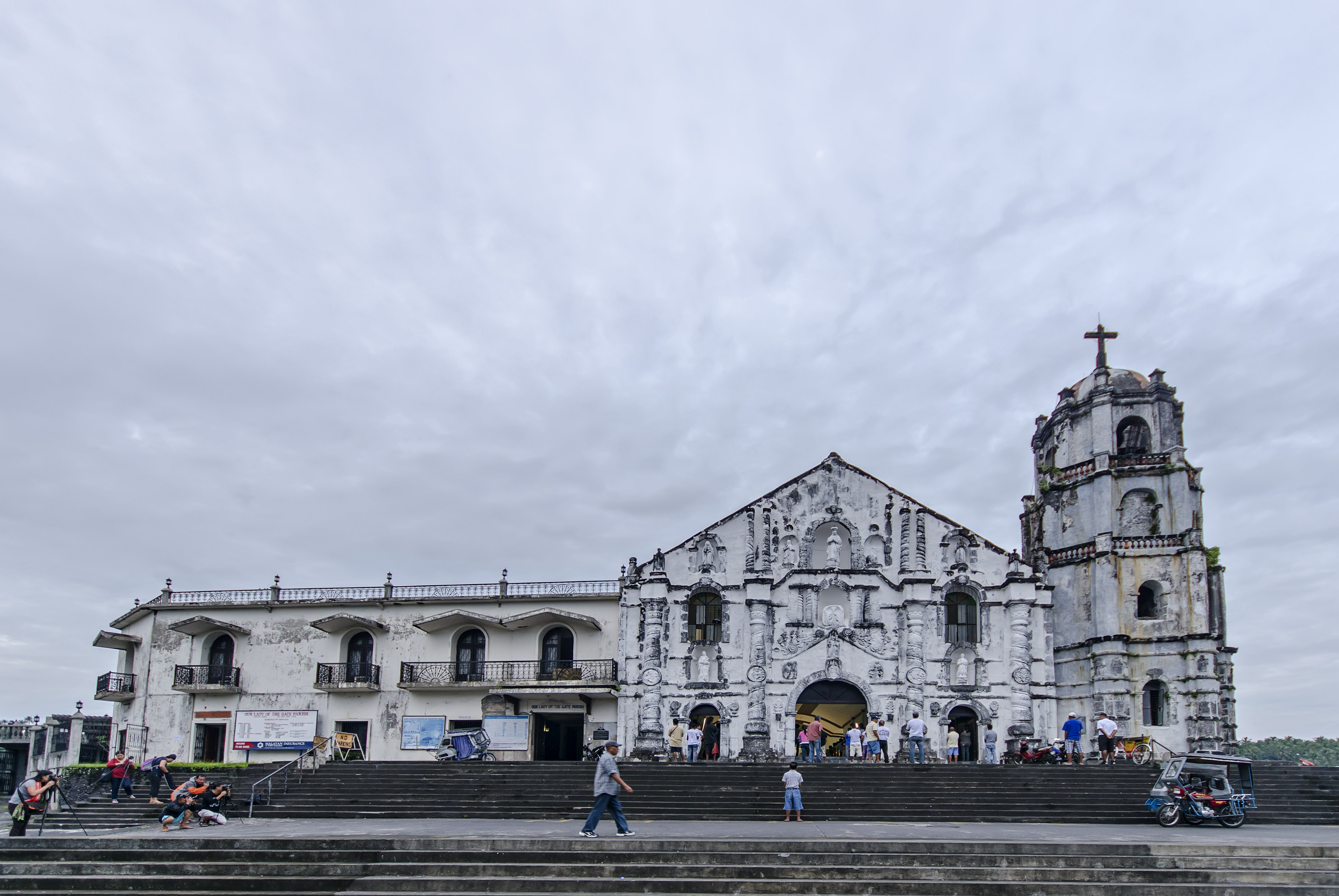
The church and convent in 2013

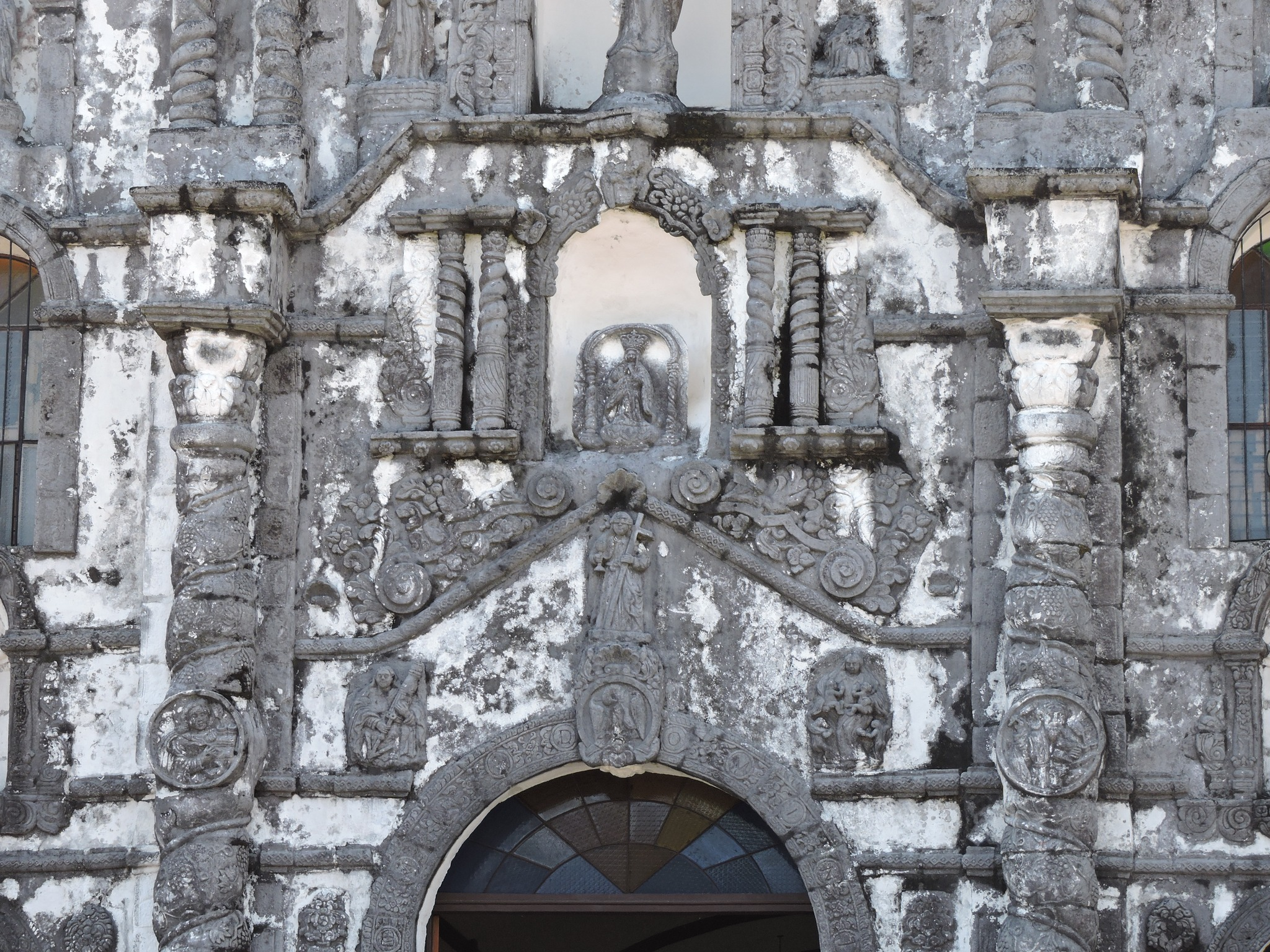
The stonework above the main church portal

Entrance portal details

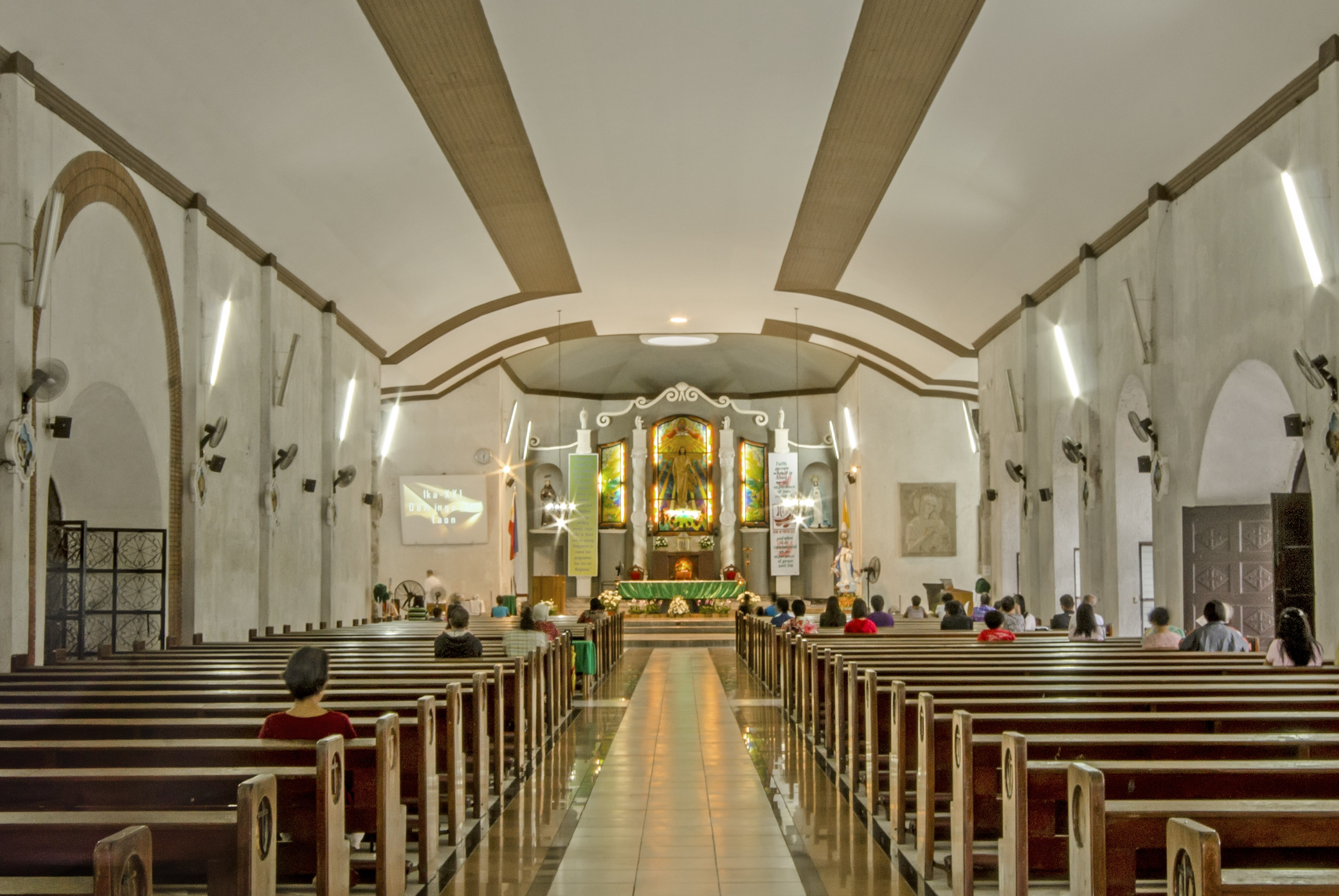
Church interior in 2013

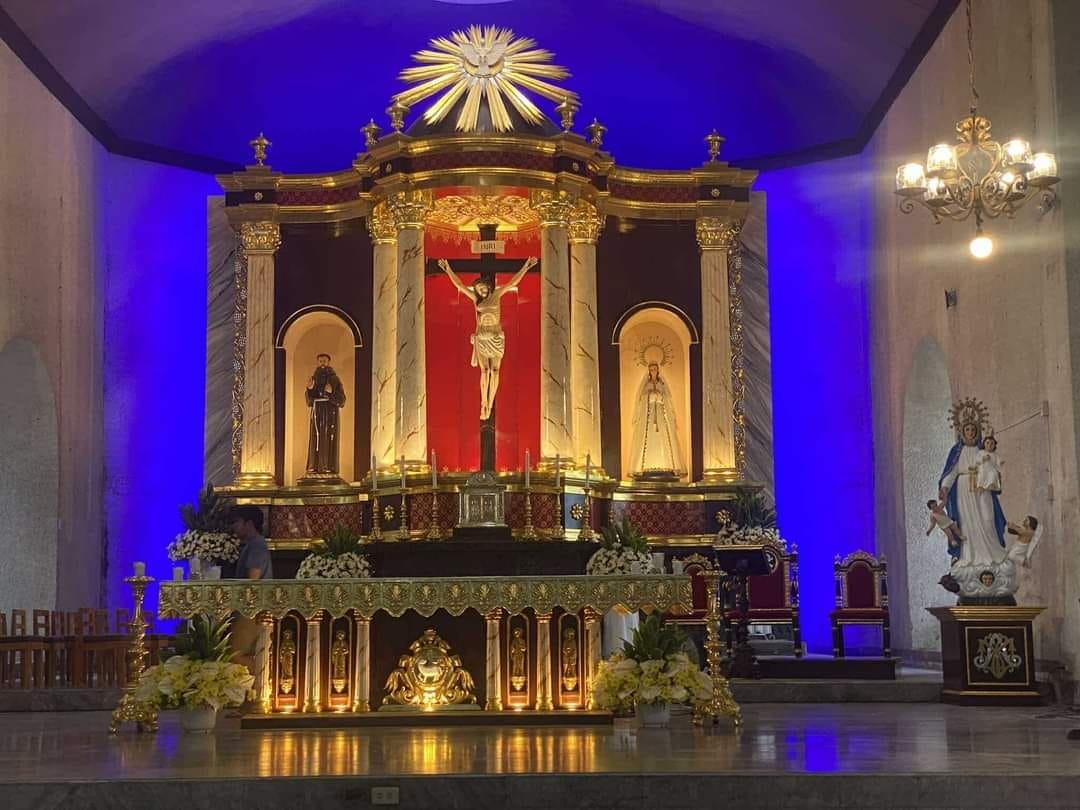
The new retablo in 2024

The church with Mayon Volcano in the background

== See also ==
- Cagsawa Ruins

== Bibliography ==
- Bloom, Greg (2005). Philippines. Lonely Planet. ISBN 9781742203706.
- Huerta, Felix (1865). Estado geográfico, topográfico, estadístico, histórico-religioso (in Spanish). Binondo: Imprenta de M. Sanchez y Ca.
- Layug, Benjamin Locsin (2007). A Tourist Guide to Notable Philippine Churches. New Day Publishers. p. 135. ISBN 9789711011680.
- Santoro, Nicholas (2011). Mary In Our Life: Atlas of the Names and Titles of Mary, the Mother of Jesus, and Their Place In Marian Devotion. iUniverse. p. 331. ISBN 9781462040223.
- Valera, Maria Cristina Turalba; Manahan, Geronimo; Mananghaya, Maria Joycelyn Bolhayon (2005). Philippine Heritage Architecture Before 1521 to the 1970s. Anvil Publishing. ISBN 9789712717093.
