= Fay Lea Patria Lauraya =

- Born: April 13, 1958 (age 68); Daraga, Albay
- Citizenship: Filipino
- Education: University of Santo Tomas-Legazpi; Bicol University
- Occupation: Educator

Fay Lea Patria M. Lauraya is a well-known Filipino educator, academic administrator, and higher education leader. She was elected as the fourth president of the University of Nueva Caceres, a private university in Naga City, Camarines Sur, a position she has held since 2018. Previously, she served as the seventh president of Bicol University from 2007 to 2015, becoming one of the youngest presidents in the institution’s history. She also participated in national higher education initiatives through CHED and private higher education organizations, including the Philippine Association of Colleges and Universities (PACU).

She was born in Daraga, Albay, Philippines. Lauraya graduated as magna cum laude with a Bachelor of Science in Economics from Aquinas University (now the University of Santo Tomas–Legazpi) in 1980. She later earned a Master of Management degree in 1989 and a Doctor of Philosophy in Development Management in 1998 from Bicol University.

Academic offices
| Preceded by Alfredo I. Ayala | President of the University of Nueva Caceres; 2018–present | Incumbent |
