= Bicol International Airport =

Airport serving Legazpi City, Albay, Philippines

Bicol International Airport Pankinàban na Palayogan kan Bikol Paliparang Pandaigdig ng Bikol
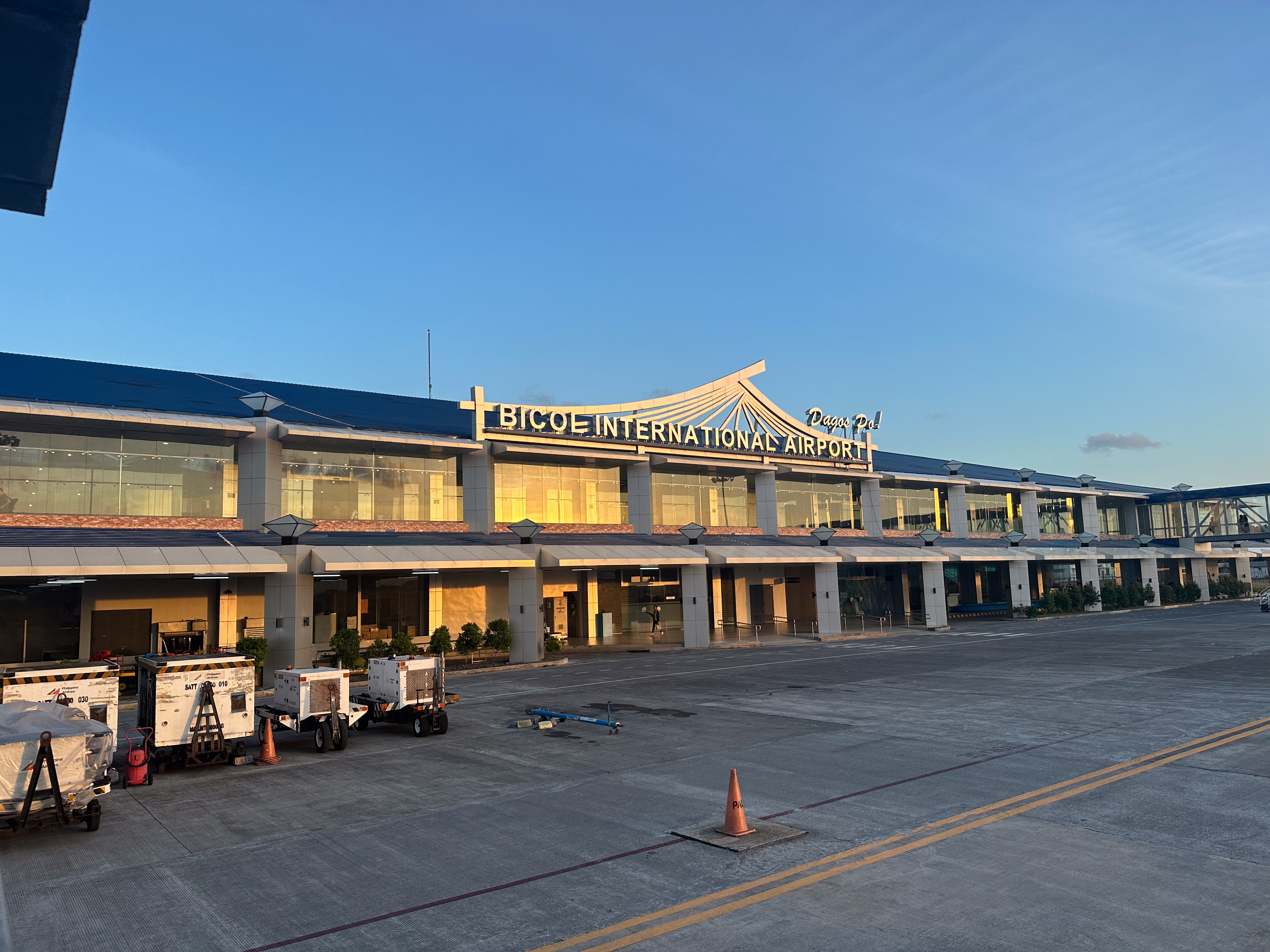
- IATA: DRP; ICAO: RPLK

Summary
- Airport type: Public
- Owner/Operator: Civil Aviation Authority of the Philippines
- Serves: Legazpi
- Location: Daraga, Albay, Philippines
- Opened: October 8, 2021; 4 years ago
- Elevation AMSL: 95 m (312 ft)
- Coordinates: 13°06′44″N 123°40′38″E

Map
- Location within Albay Location within Luzon Location within Philippines

Runways
Direction	Length		Surface
Direction	m	ft	Surface
05/23 (Note: Runway 05 is 2,050 meters (6,730 ft) long with a displaced threshold of 450 meters (1,480 ft) and 23 is 1,900 meters (6,200 ft) long with a displaced threshold of 600 meters (2,000 ft).)	2,500	8,202	Asphalt

Statistics (2023)
- Passenger movements: 662,580 ▲25.79%
- Aircraft movements: 6,538 ▲12.92%
- Cargo (in kg): 674,543 ▲47.06
- Source: CAAP

Bicol International Airport (IATA: DRP, ICAO: RPLK), also referred by some sources as Southern Luzon International Airport, is an airport serving the vicinity of Legazpi, the capital city of Albay and the regional center of Bicol Region, in the Philippines. Dubbed as the Philippines' "Most Scenic Gateway", the airport is located in Daraga, a municipality adjacent to Legazpi City. The ₱4.7 billion project is on a 200-hectare (490-acre) plateau 15 kilometers (9.3 mi) from Mayon Volcano. It replaced the old Legazpi Airport, which is only 2 to 3 kilometers (1.2 to 1.9 mi) from the BIA.

First planned in 1996 and with initial construction beginning in 2008, the airport was finally inaugurated on October 7, 2021. It was designed to handle an estimated 2.2 million passengers every year. While the airport is billed as an international airport, it is classified as Class 1 principal domestic airport by the Civil Aviation Authority of the Philippines.

== History ==
=== Planning ===
Plans for an international airport in Legazpi started in 1996. In 1997, a study commissioned by the Japan International Cooperation Agency (JICA) indicated the need for expansion at four airports in the Philippines: namely Legazpi Airport, Bacolod City Domestic Airport, Mandurriao Airport in Iloilo City and Daniel Z. Romualdez Airport in Tacloban.

On March 4 and 5, 2006, officials in Daraga, where the airport would be constructed, discussed with the barangay captains and Leaders of barangays Alobo, Inarado, Kinawitan, Burgos, Martos territory, Velasco Hacienda, and Mabini over the conversion of agricultural lands into industrial lands for the airport. It is estimated to occupy at least 200 hectares (490 acres) of land, and many families could be displaced from the construction. It will be the first international airport to be built in Bicolandia and, according to Daraga Mayor Gerry Rodrigueza Jaucian, would be a testament to economic growth in the region and of the dreams of Bicolanos, as shown in the following excerpt from the Manila Times: "We’re grateful to the President for fulfilling the Bicolanos’ dream to have an international airport. This is the realization of our quest to become one of the booming regions in the country."

=== Construction and delays ===
In July 2007, ordered the Department of Transportation and Communications (DoTC; now simply Department of Transportation), to fast-track the paperwork on the planned new airport. Then-President Gloria Macapagal Arroyo released ₱85 million for its advance engineering study. Tourism secretary Ace Durano has assured the allotment of ₱250 million for the purchase of land.

The airport was originally scheduled for completion in 2014. However, due to a construction delay, the project was expected to be finished at an unspecified date before 2016. In June 2015, it was reported that the construction is 47% done and would be finished in July 2017, but in July 2016 it was reported that the construction would be delayed further and would be finished in August 2018.

In September 2012, the Department of Budget and Management released ₱4.6 billion to support the public-private partnership (PPP) projects of the DOTC. Of the total, the airport will receive ₱2 billion to develop and fund the engineering of runways and taxiways.

Construction works for the runway, taxiway, apron, and fences were mostly left uncompleted in 2012, and budget was reverted to the national treasury.

The construction was fast-tracked under the Duterte administration through the Build! Build! Build! infrastructure program. The groundbreaking ceremony of the airport was held on December 8, 2016, with the construction of landside facilities that began in the same year.

On the night of September 28, 2017, people suspected to be members of the New People's Army committed arson to 11 heavy equipment that were used for the airport's construction.

After a delay in construction for more than a decade, Bicol International Airport was confirmed to be 50% complete in August 2018, with construction works in the runway, taxi apron, and perimeter fence being completed. By January 2020, the airport was confirmed to be 62% complete, with the airport slated for completion by July 2020. However, the July 2020 completion was delayed.

=== Opening and start of operations ===
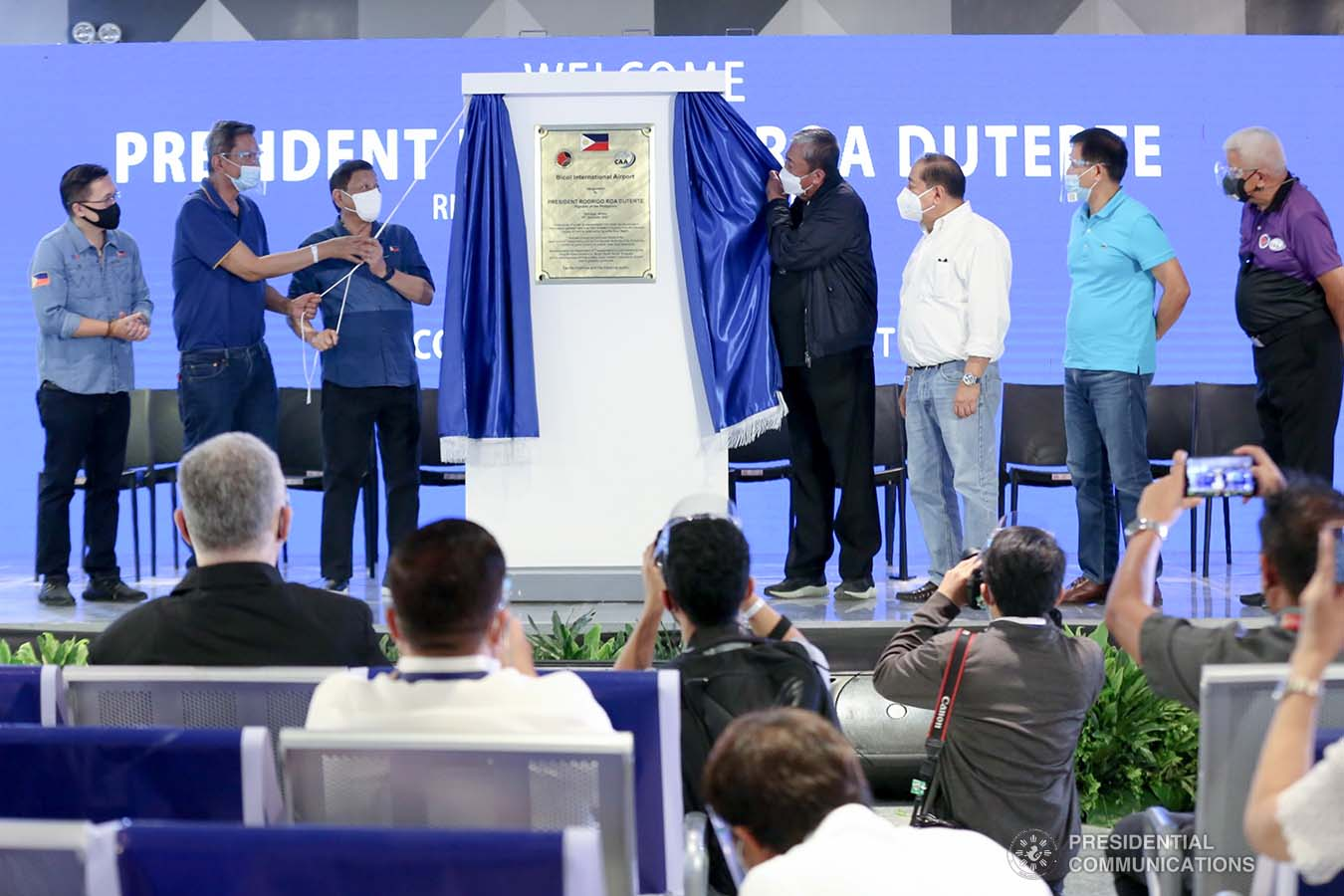
President Rodrigo Duterte leading the inauguration of Bicol International Airport on October 7, 2021

The airport was inaugurated by President Rodrigo Duterte on October 7, 2021, with operations commencing the following day. The airport will initially handle domestic operations, while international flights were expected to start by November 7. However, there are currently no international flights servicing the airport as of now.

The first commercial flight to land at the airport, Philippine Airlines Flight 2923 from Manila, a flight operated by PAL Express and performed by a Dash 8 Q400, landed at 9:57 am PHT. Cebu Pacific also started operating flights at the airport on the same day. Flights operating at the airport were initially served by turboprops until Airbus A320 flights begun on May 1, 2022. Cebu Pacific landed its first A320 flight at the airport as Flight 321 at 4:39 am PHT, while PAL landed its first A320 flight as Flight 2919 later that day.

== Structure ==
=== Passenger terminal ===
The 13,680-square-meter (147,300 sq ft) passenger terminal has two levels and is designed to accommodate two million passengers annually. It features self-service check-in kiosks aside from 19 check-in counters, a lounge at the airport lobby, and two jet bridges.

EM Cuerpo handled the construction of the passenger terminal building along with the runway extension.

=== Runway ===
The airport has a single runway which is 2,500 meters (8,200 ft) long and 45 meters (148 ft) wide, running in a direction of 05°/23°. The runway is longer and wider than the now-defunct Legazpi Airport, allowing larger aircraft to land at the airport. Moreover, the airport is capable of operating at night. However, only 1,900 to 2,000 meters of the runway were operationally used, as there are transmission lines blocking the remaining meters of the runway. DOTr, CAAP and the NGCP said that the issue will be resolved, which means the airport might handle international flights soon.

== Airlines and destinations ==
Airlines	Destinations
Cebgo	Cebu, Iloilo
Cebu Pacific	Manila
PAL Express	Manila

== Statistics ==
Data from the Civil Aviation Authority of the Philippines (CAAP).

Year	Passenger movements	% change	Aircraft movements	% change	Cargo movements (in kg)	% change
2021	65,139	Steady	2,049	Steady	144,253	Steady
2022	526,742	▲708.64	5,790	▲182.58	458,698	▲217.98
2023	662,580	▲25.79	6,538	▲12.92	674,543	▲47.06

== Accidents and incidents ==
- On February 18, 2023, a Cessna 340 plane departing from the airport en route to Manila crashed near the crater of Mayon Volcano. All four occupants were killed.

== See also ==
- Legazpi Airport
- List of airports in the Philippines
