= Cagsawa Ruins =

Catholic church ruins in Albay, Philippines

- Rugba nin Cagsawa
- Kagsawa, Cagsaua
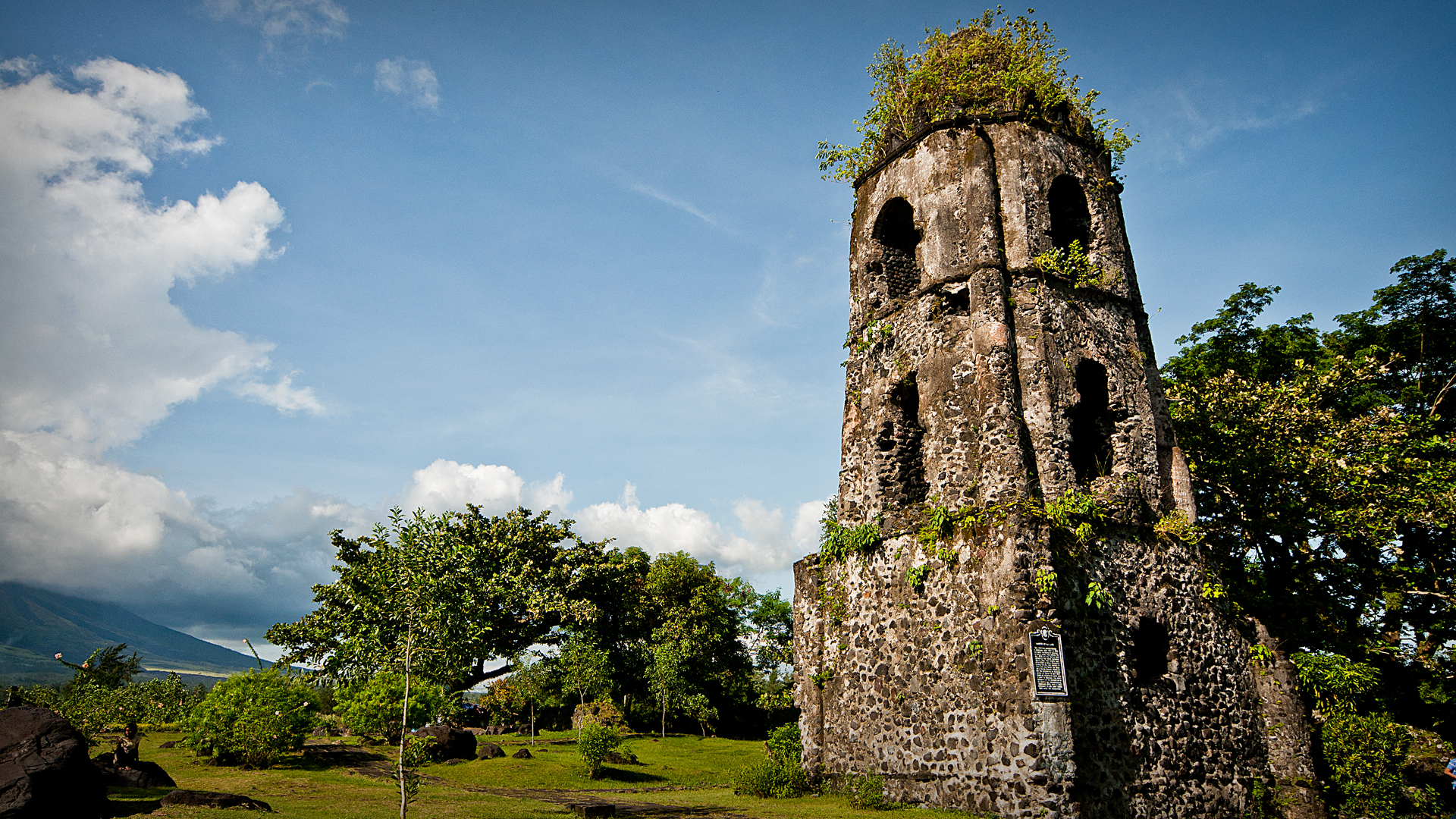
- Only the church tower and the walls remains the Cagsawa Churches, which was destroyed by the 1814 eruption of Mayon Volcano

- Location within Albay Location within Luzon Location within Philippines
- 13°9′58″N 123°42′4″E
- Type: Church
- Location: Barangay Busay, Daraga, Albay, Bicol Region, Philippines

History
- Built: 1724
- Built by: Franciscan order
- Abandoned: 1814

Site notes
- Area: 500 m^{2} (5,400 sq ft)
- Management: Local government of Daraga and the National Museum of the Philippines

The Cagsawa Ruins (also spelled as Kagsawa, historically spelled as Cagsaua) are the remnants of a 16th-century Franciscan church. It was originally built in the town of Cagsawa in 1587 but was burned down by Dutch pirates in 1636. It was rebuilt in 1724, but it was permanently destroyed, along with Cagsawa itself, on February 1, 1814, in an eruption of Mayon Volcano.

The ruins are located in Barangay Busay in the municipality of Daraga, Albay, Philippines. They are part of Cagsawa Park, which is protected and maintained by the municipal government of Daraga and the National Museum of the Philippines. They are located 2.2 km (1.4 mi) from Daraga, 3.3 km (2.1 mi) from Legazpi Airport, 8 km (5.0 mi) from Legazpi, and 11 kilometres (6.8 mi) away from Mayon.

== History ==
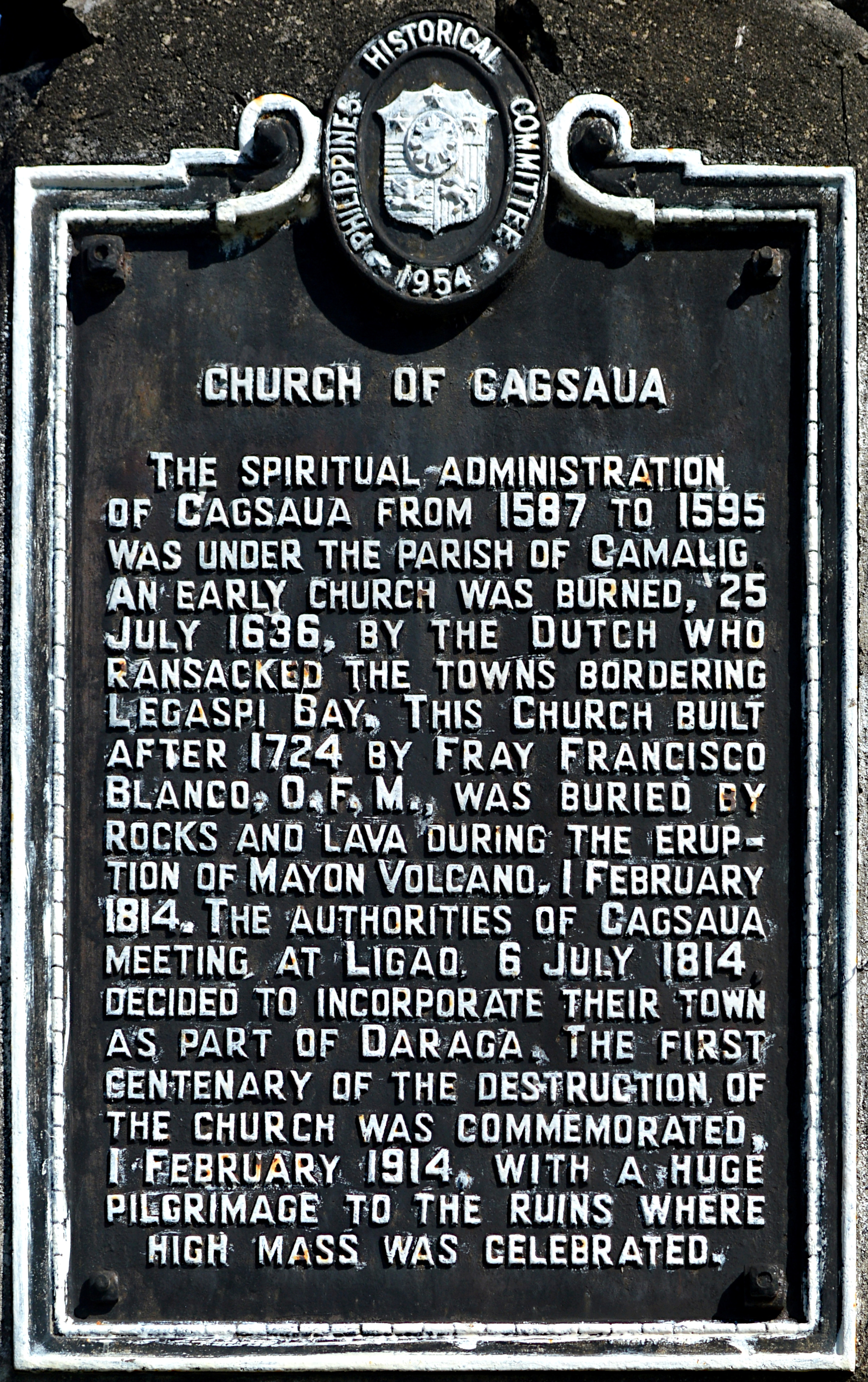
Church PHC historical marker

The baroque church was originally built in 1587 in the town of Cagsawa (spelled as Cagsaua during the Hispanic era in the Philippines). However, it was burned down by Dutch pirates on July 25, 1636. In 1724, the church was rebuilt by Franciscan friars under Fr. Francisco Blanco. A preliminary excavation showed that Mesoamerican influences were used in constructing the complex.

On February 1, 1814, a strong eruption of Mayon buried Cagsawa under several hundred million cubic meters of tephra and lahar, killing an estimated 2,000 people. Only the belfry and some parts of the convent survive today. Parts of the crumbling facade were still standing long after the 1814 eruption as attested by photographs, although they have since collapsed. Survivors of the 1814 eruption resettled into Daraga, then a mere barrio of Cagsawa.

The ruins were also subjected to Super Typhoon Durian (designated Typhoon Reming by PAGASA) in 2006. Even as the typhoon devastated the surrounding countryside with mudslides and lahar that killed at least 1,266 people, the ruins were unharmed.

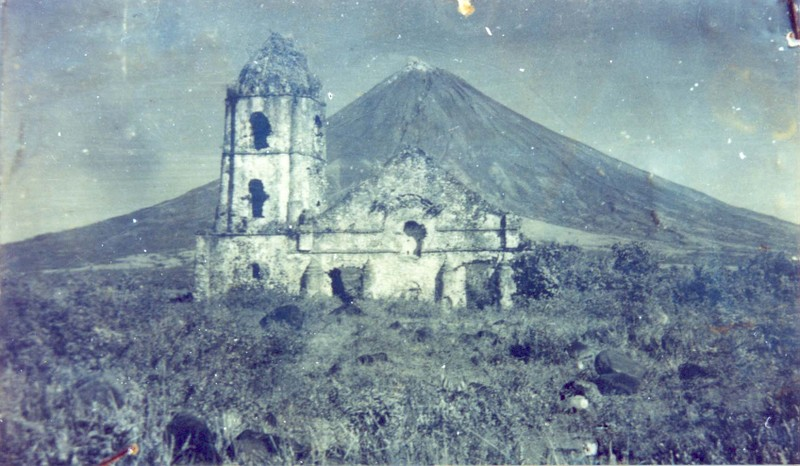
Façade of the old church of Cagsawa, undated

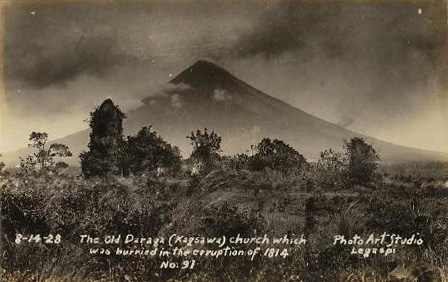
Cagsawa ruins in 1928

== Tourism ==
The ruins of the Cagsawa church now stand as the site of the Cagsawa Ruins Park and the Cagsawa Branch of the National Museum of the Philippines. The museum was established on land that was donated by the municipality of Daraga to the National Museum on January 26, 1981. It was formally inaugurated on October 30, 1992, and is the third largest regional branch of the National Museum. It houses a collection of photographs of the volcanic eruptions of Mount Mayon and various geological and archeological exhibits. All-terrain-vehicle (ATV) tours, which allow tourists to trail down the lava front, are also provided in the area.

Additionally, the Cagsawa Festival was launched in 2012 by the provincial government of Albay and the municipal government of Daraga. The festival showcases various activities and entertainment such as outdoor and sport events, culinary activities, and cultural presentations of dances and plays. In line with this, the Pintura Cagsawa was also introduced, which provides a venue for artists to showcase their works through body painting. On February 1, 2014, the 200th anniversary of the 1814 eruption was commemorated by holding the Cagsawa Festival as tribute to the strength and resiliency of the people in Albay, and as a reminder of the dangers of living near an active volcano and their commitment to disaster risk reduction.
