= University of Nueva Caceres =

Private university in Camarines Sur, Philippines

- Unibersidad kan Nueva Caceres (Central Bikol); Pamantasan ng Nueva Caceres (Filipino)
- University seal
- Former name: Nueva Caceres Colleges (1948)
- Motto: Non Scholæ Sed Vitæ (Latin)
- Motto in English: Not of School, but of Life
- Type: Private, non-sectarian, coeducational, basic and higher education institution
- Established: June 01, 1948 (78 years and 167 days)
- Founder: Jaime Hernandez Sr.
- Academic affiliations: PACU-COA
- Chairman: Rosie N. Evangelista
- President: Fay Lea Patria M. Lauraya (July 30, 2018–present); 4th university president
- Total staff: 600+
- Students: Approximately 10,000 (all levels as of 2018)
- Undergraduates: 5,000
- Postgraduates: 2,000
- Location: J. Hernandez Ave., Naga, Camarines Sur, Philippines; 13°37′29″N 123°10′57″E
- Campus: Urban, 5 ha (50,000 m^{2})
- Newspaper: The Democrat
- Alma mater song: "UNC Hymn"
- Colors: Red Gray
- Nickname: Greyhounds
- Sporting affiliations: Naga City Inter-Collegiate Basketball League; PRISAA
- Website: unc.edu.ph
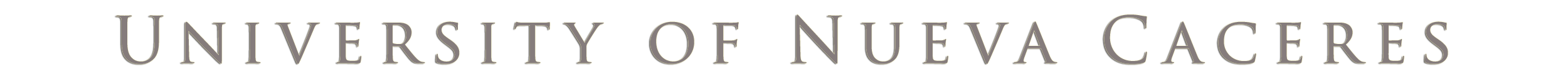

- Location in Luzon Location in the Philippines

The University of Nueva Caceres (Central Bikol: Unibersidad kan Nueva Caceres and Filipino: Pamantasan ng Nueva Caceres), also referred to by its acronym UNC, is a private non-sectarian basic and higher education institution in Naga City, Bicol Region, Philippines. It is run by iPeople, Inc., a joint venture of Ayala Corporation and Yuchengco Group of Companies. It is the oldest and the first university in southern Luzon. Founded by Dr. Jaime Hernandez Sr. in 1948, it offers pre-school, elementary, junior high school, senior high school, undergraduate, and graduate programs.

The government recognizes all course offerings, the Colleges of Arts and Sciences, Education, Business, and Accountancy are accredited by the Philippine Association of Colleges and Universities Commission on Accreditation (PACU-COA).

== History ==
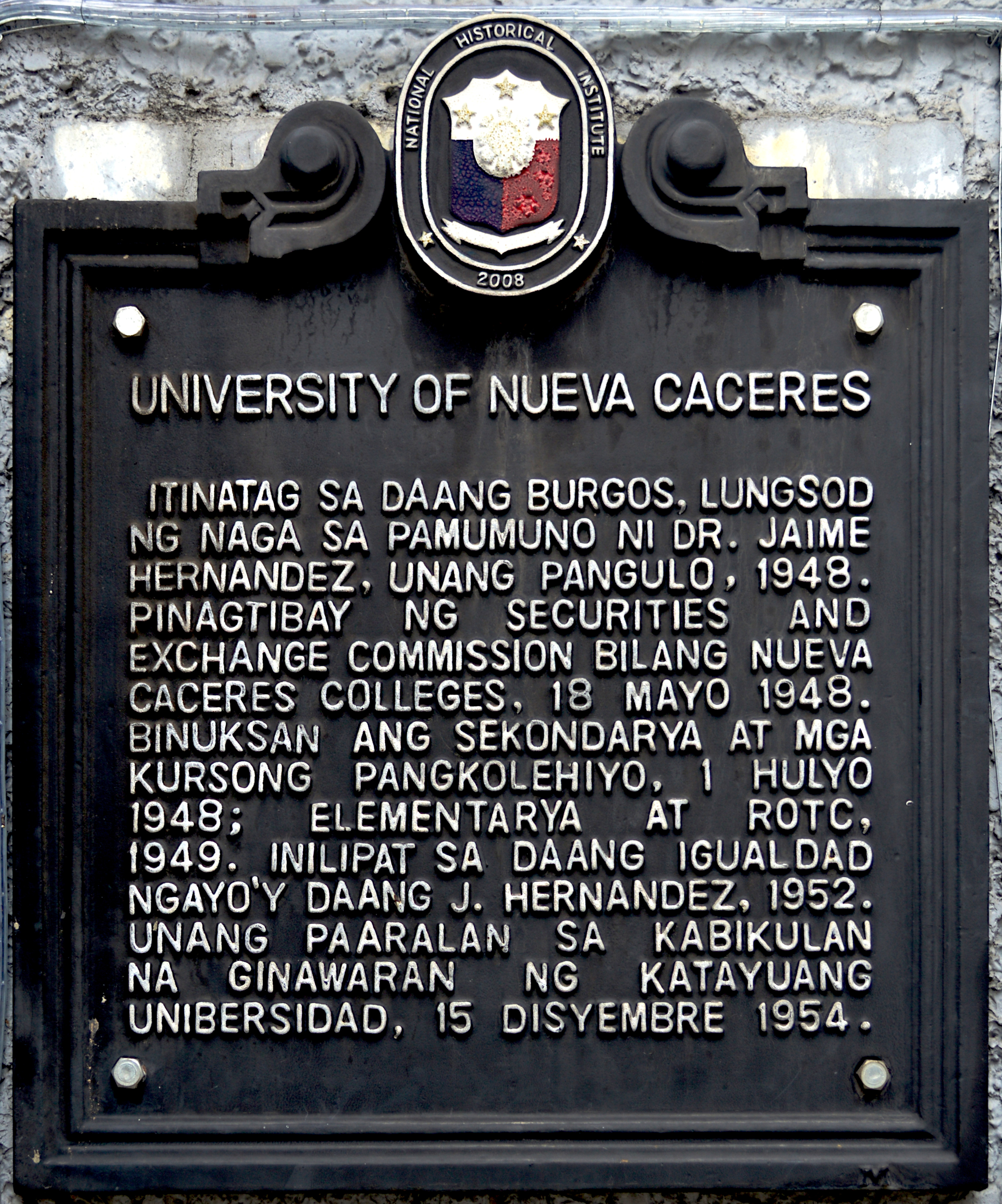
National historical marker installed in 2008

In February 1948, Don Jaime Hernandez Sr. invited Bicolanos to join him as incorporators of a planned new school. The incorporation papers were signed on May 9, 1948, by Hernandez himself, Jaime Reyes, Jose T. Fuentebella, Edmundo Cea, Atty. Buenaventura Blancaflor, Nicole Tado Sr., Juan F. Trivino, Antonio M. Sison, Manuel Abella, and Domingo Abella, among others. The Securities and Exchange Commission approved the incorporators on May 18, 1948.

The school officially started operation on July 1, 1948, as the Nueva Caceres Colleges. The initial courses offered were Liberal Arts, Commerce, Education, and high school with a total enrollment of 958. The students of the newly opened school had their classes in the rented Flordeliza Building fronting the public kiosk (now Plaza Quezon) and the Governor Andres Hernandez residence along Burgos Street (now Grand Imperial Plaza).

In the ensuing years, additional courses were offered: elementary (1949), graduate school (1953), law (1951), engineering (1949), nursing (defunct 1955–2005), secretarial (1955) and kindergarten (1993).

In September 1951, the university administration acquired the Rey property and transformed it from a marshland to its present condition. By early 1952 almost half of the site was filled, and buildings began to rise. Bishop Pedro P. Santos blessed the new campus and the first two buildings, the original Dato Hall and Alba Hall, on July 11, 1952. Other buildings were soon built to address the needs of a growing student population. Under the leadership of university president Dolores H. Sison, there is an ongoing multimillion infrastructure program to further modernize the institution.

On July 30, 2018, Fay Lea Patria M. Lauraya was appointed as the fourth president of the university.

=== Ayala Education, Inc. ===
On July 28, 2015, the Ayala Group raised its stake in the Philippine education sector by investing ₱450 million to acquire 60 percent of University of Nueva Caceres. As a result of this investment, Ayala Education will hold the majority of UNC's board seats. In addition, UNC appointed Ayala Education's CEO, Alfredo Ayala, as the president of the board of trustees.

== Organization and administration ==
=== Presidents ===
- Jaime Hernandez Sr. (May 18, 1948 – )
- Dolores H. Sison
- Alfredo I. Ayala (July 28, 2015 – July 29, 2018)
- Fay Lea Patria M. Lauraya (July 30, 2018 – present)

=== Board of trustees ===
- President – Alfredo I. Ayala

Trustees:

- Carlos H. Ravanera
- Rosalie A. Dimaano
- Felipe P. Estrella III
- Eleanor S. Salumbre
- Charlene C. Tapic-Castro

== UNC Greyhounds ==
The University of Nueva Caceres has chosen the "Greyhound" as the mascot of the school.

== Academics ==
=== College of Computer Studies ===
The College of Computer Studies was established when the population of Computer Science majors (formerly belonging to the College of Arts and Sciences) grew in size. It was formerly known as the College of Information Technology. This eventually changed in 2003, when the college added two new four-year courses: Bachelor of Science in Information Technology and Bachelor of Science in Information Management.

The college offers courses that specialize in computers as well as a variety of liberal arts courses. Three degrees of concentration are available: Bachelor of Science in Computer Science (BSCS), Bachelor of Science in Information Technology (BSIT) and Bachelor of Science in Information Management (BSIM). Certificate courses are available for students who choose to focus on acquiring computer skills. These are two-year courses in Associate in Computer Technology (ACT), Computer Technician (CT), and Network Technician (NT).

=== LINC Senior High School ===
LINC, or Learning with Industry Collaboration, is the Senior High School Academic Program at the University of Nueva Caceres.

Academic tracks	Accountancy, Business, and Management (ABM); General Academic Strand (GAS); Science, Technology, Engineering, Mathematics (STEM)
Tech. Voc. tracks	Food and Beverage Services (FBS); Information and Communication Technology (ICT)

== Publications ==
- The Democrat – The independent student publication of the University of Nueva Caceres
- The Pantograph – The official student publication of the UNC Senior High School Department
- The Trailblazer – The official student publication of the UNC Junior High School Department
- Citrus – The official publication of the School of Computer and Information Sciences
- Literati – The official publication of the College of Arts and Sciences
- Sed Vitae – Published once a year by the Research Center of the University of Nueva Caceres
- The A-Venue – The official UNC GS student-faculty publication
- The Torch – The official student publication of the UNC College of Education
- The Perspective – The official student publication of UNC College of Engineering and Architecture
- Tycoon – The official publication of the College of Business and Accountancy
- The Children's World – The official publication of the Elementary Department
- Red and Gray – The annual pictorial review published by the graduating students at the end of the school year

== Community extension ==
The University of Nueva Caceres – Institutionalized Community Extension Services (UNC – ICES) is the central office and coordinating center of the university for its Extension Service Program. It serves as the institutional coordinating arm of various departments, colleges, and student organizations' community services. The office initiates and co-implements projects and programs and identifies departments which will be the lead implementer based on their line of interest and expertise. It assists, advises, monitors and evaluates the Extension Program of the university or specific department as it ties with offices like the Research Center, DSA, VPSEA, Deans and Principals, and the Local Government Units (LGUs), Government Line Agencies, NGOs, and POs.

ICES ensures that students, faculty members, and non-teaching personnel of the university are provided with opportunities to get involved in various extension activities or program either institutionally or departmentally initiated and implemented. Once in a while alumni and UNC partners like Parents – Teachers – Council are tapped to support activities. Students' involvement in Extension is varied. It can be curricular-related (like Social Arts, NSTP – CWTS, Practicum), extra-curricular involvement (like student organizations / fraternities / sororities), or simply volunteerism (like ICES student volunteers, Campus Ministry volunteers, Peer facilitators, College Red Cross Youth). Teaching and non-teaching personnel can participate as resource speakers, lecturers, facilitators, trainer initiators/organizers of an activity together with identified student organizations or community groups.

== Student services ==
=== Guidance center ===
The guidance center provides services that will facilitate the growth and development of the students, so they will become more effective functional and productive members of the society.

=== Campus ministry ===
The campus ministry coordinates all religious activities within the university as well as the university's participation in related religious activities outside the campus. It plans and implements various programs geared toward moral and spiritual formation of the students and the entire university population. It encourages and develops student volunteerism for responsible and committed Christian action.

=== Office of the Director for Student Affairs ===
This office is primarily concerned with the coordination and overall development of non-academic areas of student life. It formulates and implements policies, rules and regulations concerning student activities and welfare, and provides guidance and assistance to students and in planning and organizing their activities.

=== Speech clinic ===
This clinic is equipped with individual booths, tape recorders, and earphones which enable the students to follow speech models and also hear their own voices. It trains in pronunciation, enunciation, diction, and other nuances of the English language.

=== Museum ===
The University Museum is a pet project of Don Jaime Hernandez Sr., the founder of the University of Nueva Caceres. It started on October 1, 1952, having as one of its primary aims to collect objects of interests in the arts and sciences. The UNC is the second educational institution in the Philippines to have a museum.

Curators of the UNC Museum
Hon. Ignacio Meliton (1952 – 1967)
Mr. Honorio Torres (1967 – 1969)
Mr. Rodolfo Baking (1969 – 1970)
Mr. Isidro Atienza (1970 – 1972)
Mr. Rosalio Parrone (1972 – 1975)
Mrs. Lydia San Jose (1976 – 1979)
Mr. Benjamin Dy-Liaco (1981 – 1983)
Miss Salvacion A. Ramos (1979 – 1981); (1984 – 1996)
Mr. Clodualdo Ceron (1996 – 2017)

The UNC Museum is the first museum in Bicol (October 1, 1952) with the biggest and most varied collection consisting of historical-cultural pictures and documents/realias and models on UNC/Bicol and the country on its four periods of history: the Ancient, the Spanish, the American, and the Republic. A mini-global collection ends the presentation. The temporary exhibit uses the central gallery.

The total number of visitors annually is 10,000 consisting of UNCeans and both local, provincial, regional, national educational tours, and international visitors.

The University of Nueva Caceres is the second private educational institution in the Philippines to have a museum. When the late President Emeritus Jaime Hernandez Sr. founded the Nueva Caceres Colleges, one of his dreams for the future university was the establishment of a school museum. He wanted to build sanctuary where historical relics, especially those of Bicol, might be preserved for posterity, thus on October 1, 1952, the museum was founded with Ignacio Meliton as the first Curator.

== Notable alumni ==
- Luis G. Dato – one of the first Filipino romantic poets of the 20th century
- Salvador Panelo – former presidential spokesperson of President Duterte
- Leni Robredo – 14th vice president of the Philippines (College of Law)
- Noel Tijam – an Associate Justice of the Supreme Court of the Philippines (Elementary and High School Department)
