= Legazpi Airport =

Former airport of Legazpi, Albay, Philippines (1946–2021)

Legazpi Airport Paliparan ng Legazpi Palayugan nin Legazpi
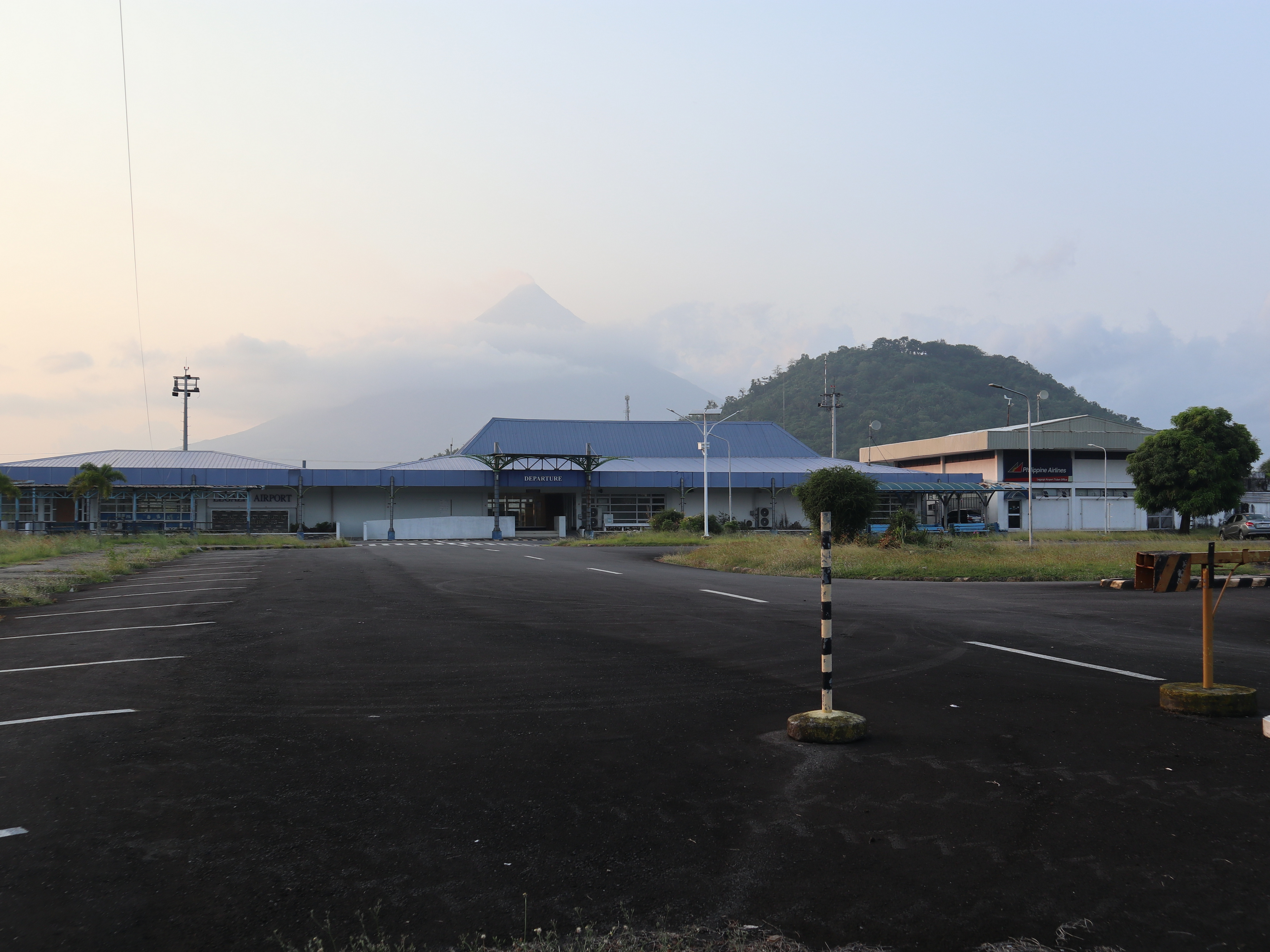
- The defunct airport in April 2023
- IATA: ~~LGP~~; ICAO: ~~RPLP~~

Summary
- Airport type: Defunct
- Owner/Operator: Civil Aviation Authority of the Philippines
- Serves: Legazpi
- Location: Barangay Cruzada, Legazpi, Albay
- Opened: 1946
- Closed: October 7, 2021
- Elevation AMSL: 20 m (66 ft)
- Coordinates: 13°9′25″N 123°44′46″E
- Website: legazpiairport.net

Map
- Location in Albay LGP/RPLP (Luzon) LGP/RPLP (Philippines)

Runways
Direction	Length		Surface
Direction	m	ft	Surface
~~06/24~~	1,976	6,483	Asphalt (Closed)

Legazpi Airport (IATA: LGP, ICAO: RPLP) was a major airport in the Bicol Region, served the vicinity of Legazpi, the capital city of Albay in the Philippines.

Prior to its closure, the airport was designated as a Class 1 principal domestic airport by the Civil Aviation Authority of the Philippines, a body of the Department of Transportation responsible for the operations of most airports in the Philippines.

The airport was replaced by the new and larger Bicol International Airport in 2021.

== History ==
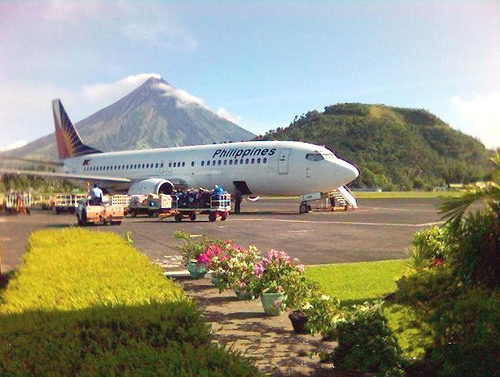
Legazpi City Airport

The site of the former Legazpi Airport used to be the Sanborn Field. This former US airfield opened in the early 1900s. During World War II, the airport was occupied by Japanese forces from 1941 until the airport was liberated by the United States Army in 1945. Commercial operations started the following year.

The jet age came to Legazpi in the late 1960s and by the 1970s Philippine Airlines (PAL) introduced regular service to/from Manila using British Aircraft Corporation's BAC 1-11s. In the late 1980s PAL introduced Boeing 737-300s. YS-11s provided airlink to Mactan, Cebu, Masbate, and Virac. When PAL phased out the YS-11s and the short-lived Shorts SD-360 'Sunriser,' Fokker 50s replaced them. Before the debilitating labor strike in 1998 which caused PAL to temporarily cease operation, Legazpi Airport served as the airline's hub in Bicol, serving Manila, Cebu, Masbate, Virac, even Catarman in Samar. Today, it serves local clients and transient passengers from southern Camarines Sur and the province of Sorsogon.

Aside from PAL, Filipinas Orient Airways and Air Manila International served the airport before 1972, the declaration of martial law in the Philippines. Through the years, other airlines came and went: Air Philippines for some time served Legazpi with YS-11s and 737-200s. Asian Spirit served Pili for flights to/from Manila and Cebu and has since ceased operations with six million pesos in collectibles from local (Naga or Pili) franchisees. Asian Spirit also planned to introduce flights to Virac and Masbate before its rebranding as Zest Airways. At present, Aboitiz cargo regularly calls on Legazpi. South East Asian Airlines, using the 19-seat LET-410. plies Cebu-Legazpi-Cebu Mondays and Fridays.

When Pope John Paul II visited the Philippines in 1981, his itinerary included the city of Legazpi. The papal plane was a chartered PAL Boeing 727. President Ferdinand Marcos arrived in his own jet; First Lady Imelda and the then-Minister of Defense, Juan Ponce Enrile, arrived with their own retinues on separate jets.

In the mid-1990s, a Harrier jumpjet of the US Marines made an emergency landing at Legazpi Airport. The nearby Alicia Hotel housed the crew for days while the aircraft was repaired.

In February 2000, during a lull in nearby Mayon Volcano's eruption (which suspended regular commercial service), a chartered Boeing 727 from Guam landed, bringing relief goods for evacuees.

On September 15, 2001, coming home from her state visit to Japan, President Gloria Macapagal Arroyo flew to Legazpi non-stop from Tokyo using a chartered PAL Airbus A320, highlighting the capability of the airport to handle international air traffic. On November 26, 2003, a Cebu Pacific DC-9-32 brought delegates to the Philippine Institute of Certified Public Accountants (PICPA) convention on a charter flight from Cebu.

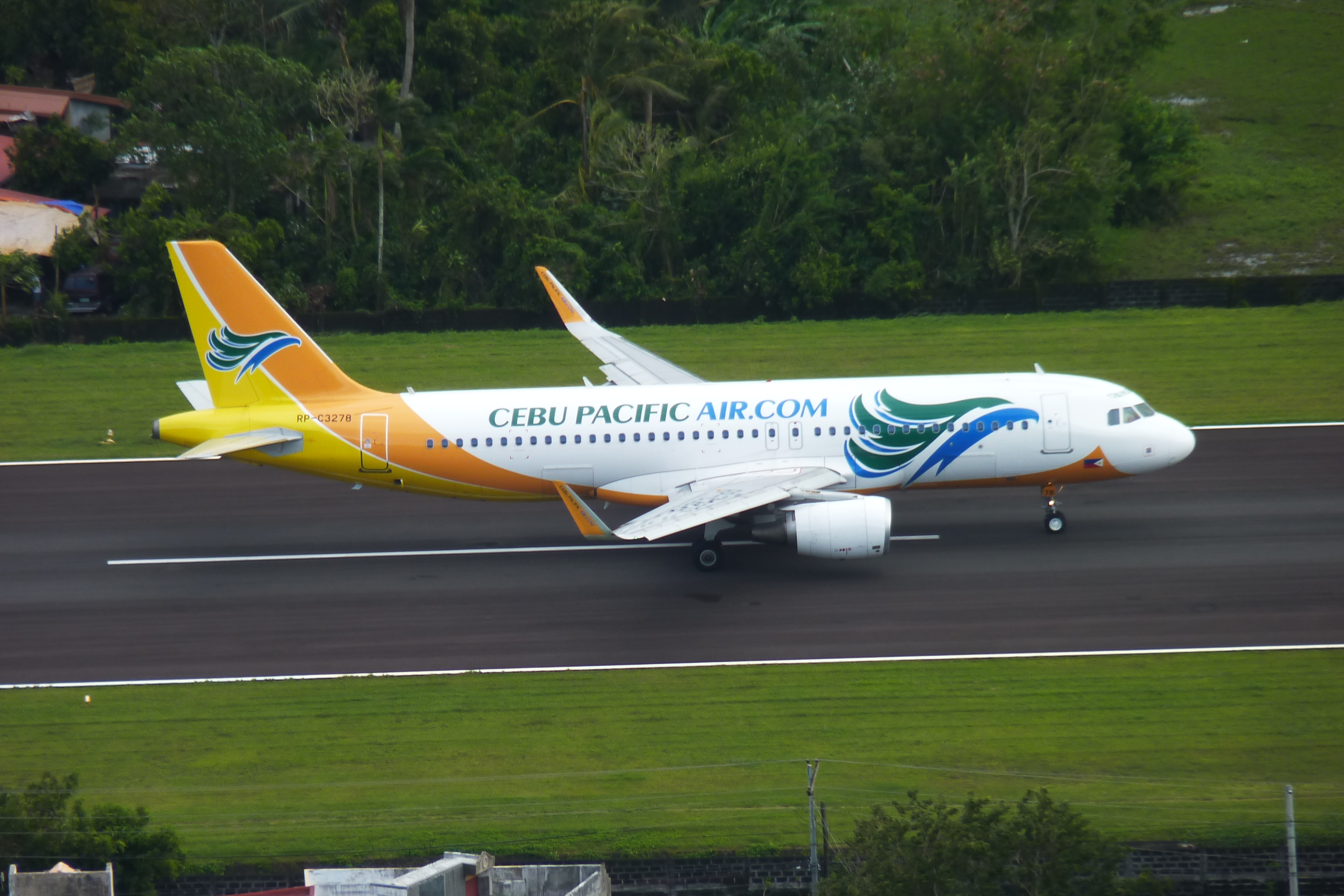
A Cebu Pacific Airbus A320 at Legazpi Airport

=== Upgrades ===
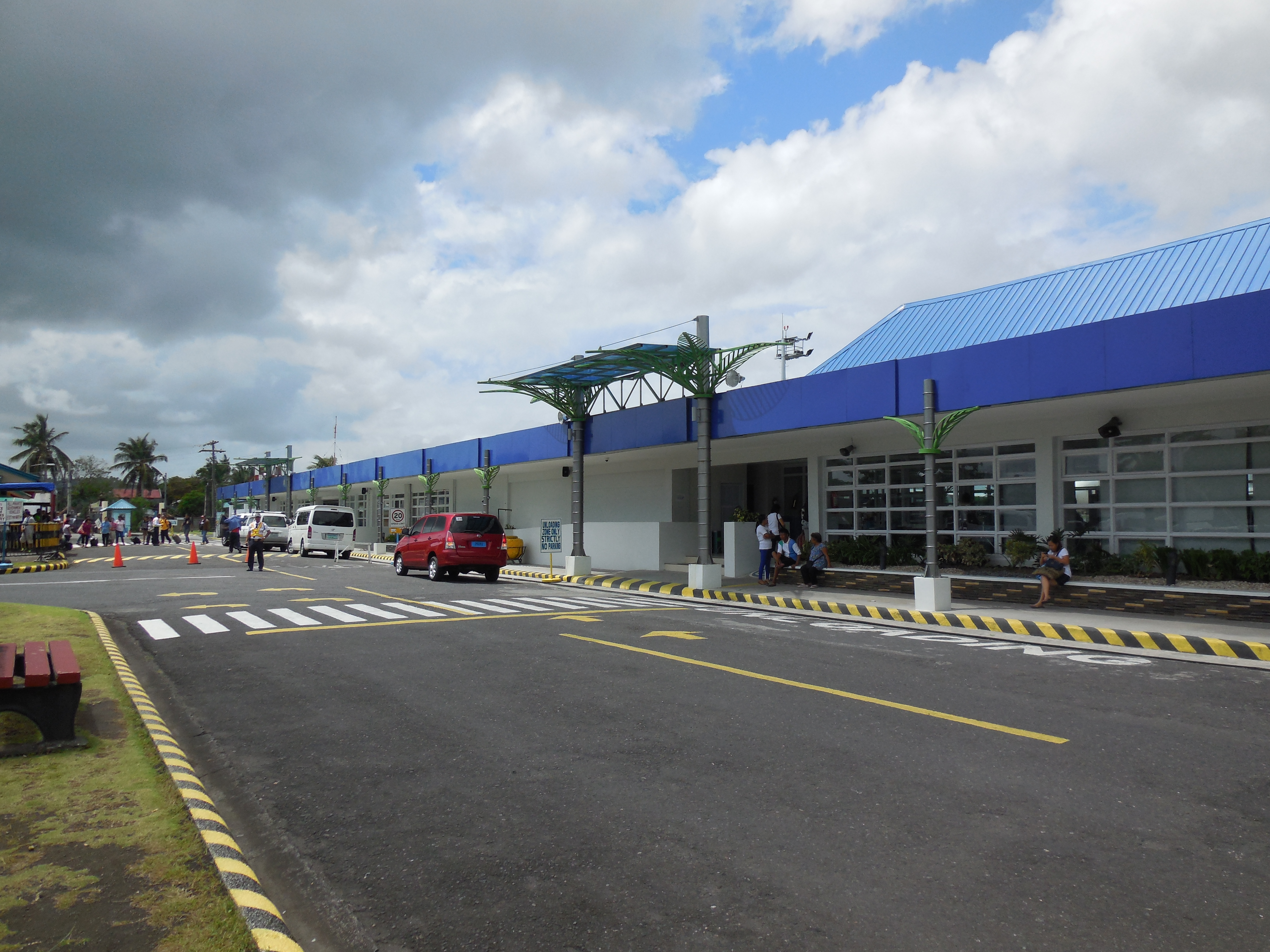
The renovated passenger terminal building in 2016.

In 2015, the passenger terminal building was refurbished and expanded under a ₱40 million refurbishment program funded by the Civil Aviation Authority of the Philippines.

Although operating as sunrise-sunset (SR-SS) due to lack of an instrument landing system (ILS), the airport can handle night landings and take-off but only on prior notice. The fact that the airfield does not have an ILS system leads to flights being delayed and/or cancelled because the airfield cannot operate in inclement weather without an ILS system. Evening flights began in 2016 after upgrades to the airport facilities, with Cebu Pacific being the first airline to operate night flights.

=== Closure ===
As early as 1996, plans were laid to construct an international airport in the neighboring municipality of Daraga, which would replace Legazpi Airport. Construction of the larger Bicol International Airport was slated to open by 2014 but was repeatedly delayed.

The airport had its last flight on October 7, 2021, and closed on the same day. After the closure, the airport site is planned to be converted into a business district.

=== Contemporary history ===
The former airport has hosted various events and, in 2025, became the concert venue for Bini during the Ibalong Festival.

== Structure ==
=== Runway ===
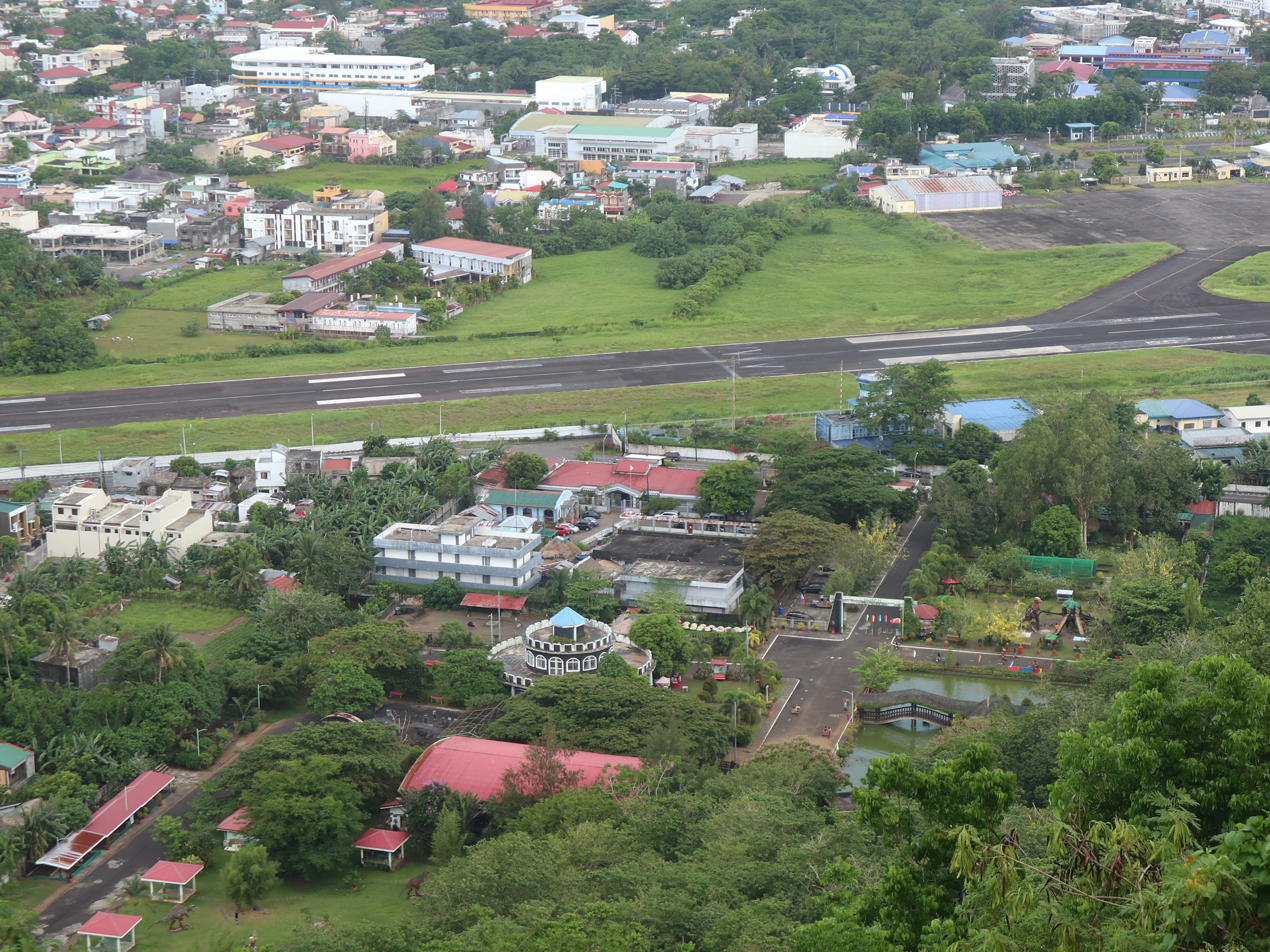
Legazpi Airport runway

The airport had a single runway which was 2,280 meters (7,480 ft) long and 36 meters (118 ft) wide. The runway was longer than those of the now-defunct Bacolod City Domestic Airport (1,958 m × 30 m [6,424 ft × 98 ft]) and Mandurriao Airport in Iloilo City (2,100 m × 43 m [6,890 ft × 141 ft]). It runs in a direction of 06/24.

=== Terminal and apron ===
The passenger terminal building at Legazpi Airport had the capacity of more than 500 passengers. After its refurbishment in 2015, separate arrival and pre-departure areas for domestic and international chartered flights were added to the terminal building, including office space for the Bureau of Immigration, customs and quarantine, and the Philippine Drug Enforcement Agency.

The airport could handle medium-sized civilian jets and military aircraft. Its apron has the capacity of three aircraft.

== Former airlines and destinations ==
Airlines that used the airport include Cebgo, Cebu Pacific, and PAL Express. Flight destinations included Cebu (Mactan–Cebu International Airport) and Manila (Ninoy Aquino International Airport).
