= Dolores Sison =

Filipino educator, philanthropist and community leader

The Honorable Dolores Sison
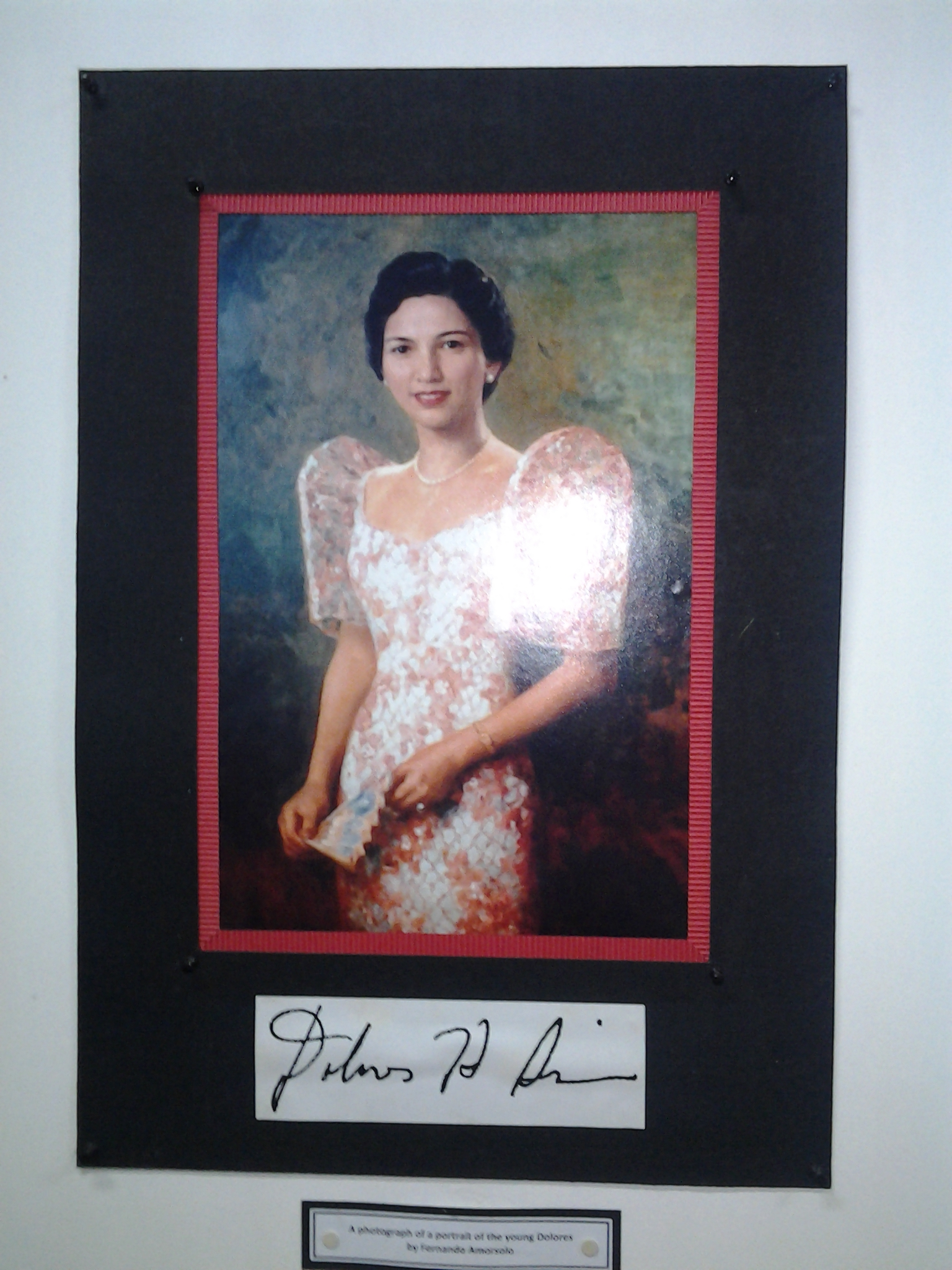

Member of the Interim Batasang Pambansa
- In office June 12, 1978 – June 5, 1984
- Constituency: Region V

Personal details
- Born: Dolores Jaucian Hernandez; October 2, 1919
- Died: September 28, 2011 (aged 91)
- Party: KBL (1978–1984)
- Spouse: Antonio Moran Sison
- Relations: Jaime Hernandez Sr. (father)
- Children: 4

Dolores "Dollie" Jaucian Hernandez-Sison (October 2, 1919 – September 28, 2011) was a Filipina educator, philanthropist, and community leader in the province of Camarines Sur, Philippines.

She also acted as a goodwill ambassador and diplomat during her term as member of Interim Batasang Pambansa from 1978 to 1984.

During her tenure as president of the University of Nueva Caceres, she held the distinction of being the third woman to become a university president in the Philippines.

== Biography ==
Sison finished high school as valedictorian at the Philippine Women's University where she also graduated cum laude in both A.B. and B.S.E courses. While at the PWU, she was president of the student council in high school and college and editor of the PhilWomenian and PWU annual. She was chosen as the Intercollegiate Girl of the College Editors Guild of the Philippines. She earned an M.A in Administration of Higher Education at Columbia University in New York City. On March 25, 1977, the PWU conferred upon her the degree of Doctor of Education, Honoris causa.

Her husband was the late Dean Antonio Moran Sison who won a delegate position to the 1971 Constitutional Convention. Sison was Philippine delegate to the 33rd and 34th UN General Assembly in 1978 and 1979 and to the world Tourism Organization Conferences: in India in 1983; Mexico, 1982; Italy, 1981; Manila, 1980; and Spain 1979. She was guest speaker at the Asian Women Parliamentarian Seminar in 1982 in Seoul, South Korea.

For 20 years Sison was member for the Board of Governors of the Philippine Red Cross. She was awarded the Gold Humanitarian Service Cross, the highest Red Cross Award for volunteer service excellence.

Deeply religious, she was a member of the Association of our Lady of Penafrancia and Cristian Maturity Formation Seminar and adviser of the Mother Butler's Mission Guild in Camarines Sur.

== Awards ==
- Doctor of Education, Honoris Causa (PWU)
- Salute to Women YMCA (1977)
- Mayoral distinguished Service Award (1977)
- Special Mayoral Award (1984)
- Gold Humanitarian Service Cross, highest award of the Philippine National Red Cross (1992)
- Aurora Aragon Quezon Medal for distinguished leadership in the cause of humanity.
- People's Republic of China Red Cross Medal for being the first Filipino to visit the Red Cross Headquarters in Beijing in 1996.
- CAPA Award as outstanding alumna of the PWU (1980)
- National Commission on the Role of Filipino Women: Outstanding Bicolana Award (1996)
- Presidential Citation of Recognition and Commendation.
