= Daraga =

Municipality in Albay, Philippines

Daraga Locsin
- Municipality
- Municipality of Daraga
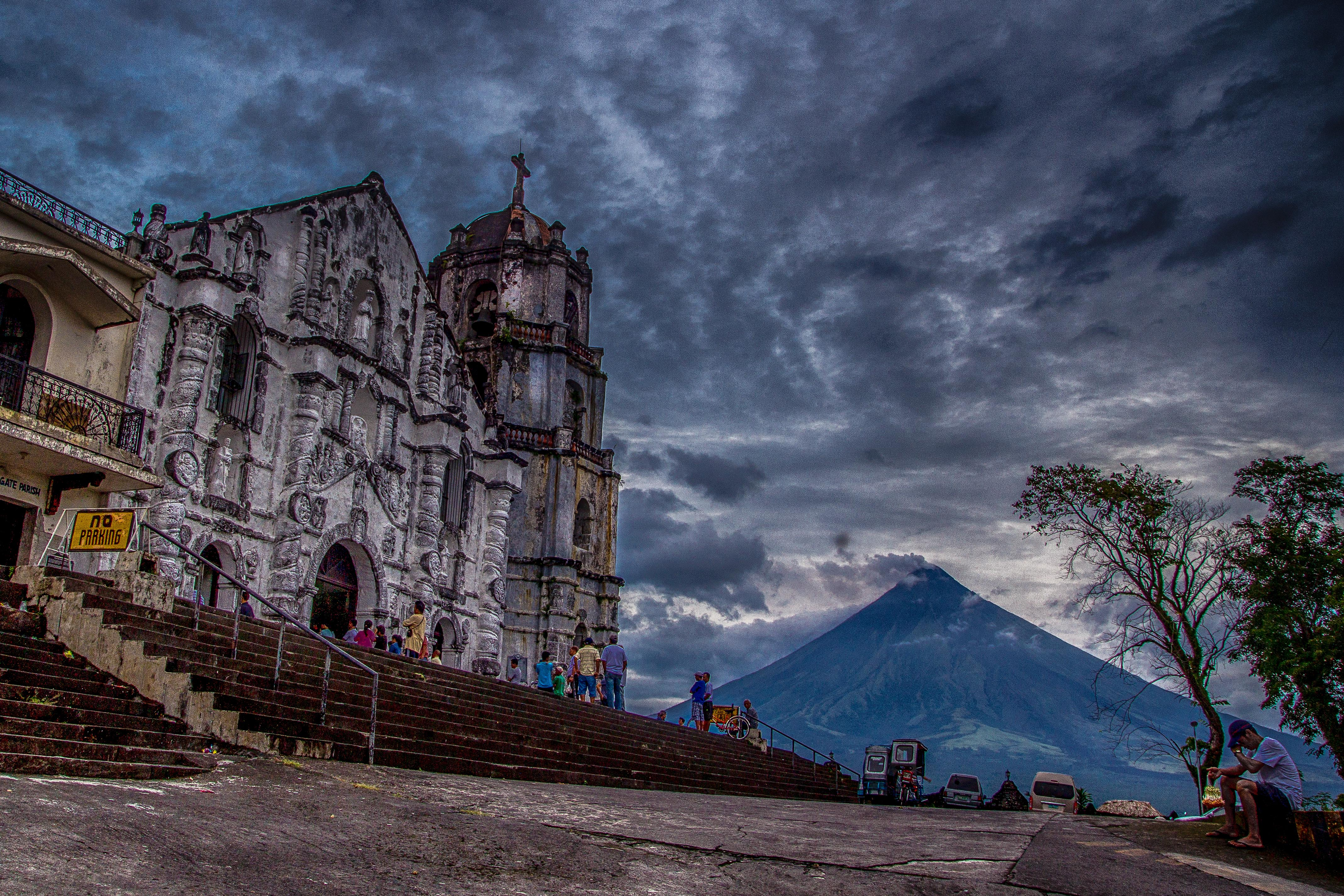
- Daraga Church with Mayon Volcano in the background

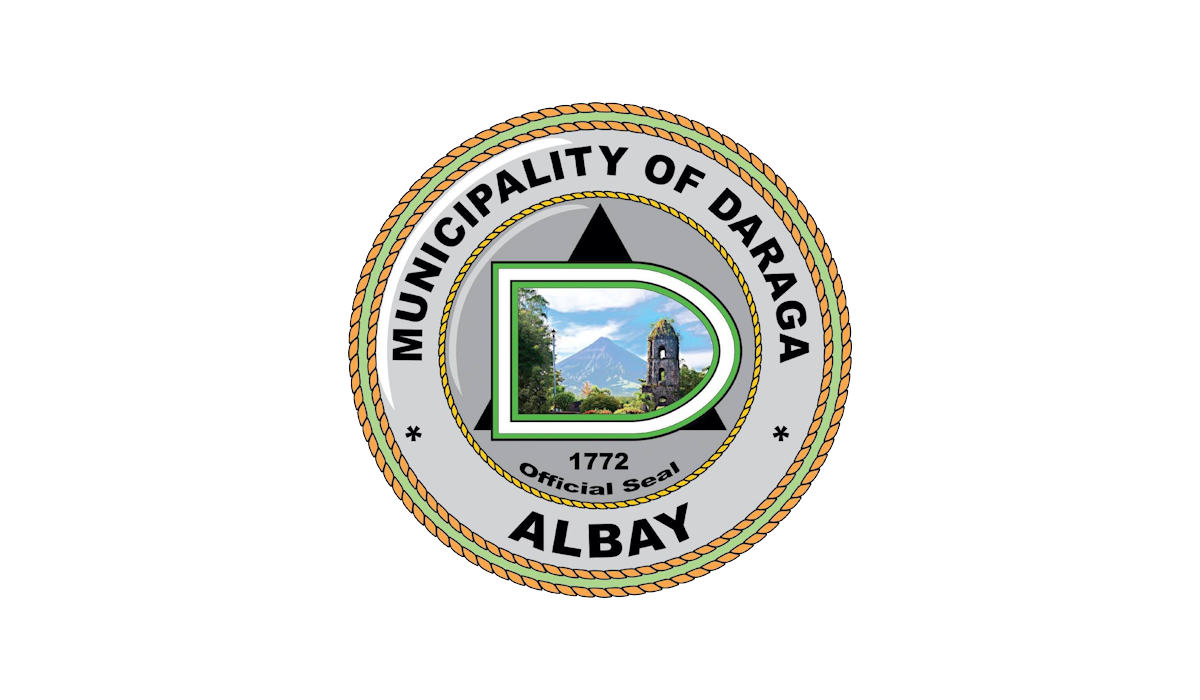
- Flag Seal
- Nickname: The International Gateway to Bicol "Home of Cagsawa Ruins"
- Motto: Viajeng Progreso
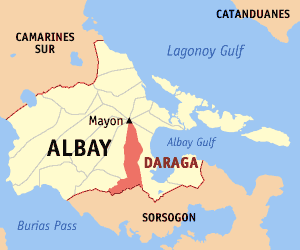
- Map of Albay with Daraga highlighted
- Interactive map of Daraga
- Location within the Philippines
- Coordinates: 13°08′53″N 123°42′43″E
- Country: Philippines
- Region: Bicol Region
- Province: Albay
- District: 2nd district
- Founded: June 12, 1772
- Barangays: 54 (see Barangays)

Government
  - Type: Sangguniang Bayan
  - Mayor: Victor U. Perete
  - Vice Mayor: Fleur Jazel T. Ruiza
  - Representative: Caloy A. Loria
  - Municipal Council: Members: Ian L. Macasinag, Esq.; Julius L. Duran; Carlos V. Baylon; Bobby Magalona; Joey Marcellana; Warren Sorsogon; Jun Nuñez; Leonides Teofilo C. de Lumen II
  - Electorate: 90,048 voters (2025)

Area
  - Total: 118.64 km^{2} (45.81 sq mi)
- Elevation: 79 m (259 ft)
- Highest elevation: 292 m (958 ft)
- Lowest elevation: 0 m (0 ft)

Population (2024 census)
  - Total: 138,000
  - Density: 1,160/km^{2} (3,010/sq mi)
  - Households: 30,777
- Demonym: Daragueño

Economy
  - Income class: 1st municipal income class
  - Poverty incidence: 16.94% (2023)
  - Revenue: ₱ 609.8 million (2024)
  - Assets: ₱ 3,420 million (2024)
  - Expenditure: ₱ 654.5 million (2024)
  - Liabilities: ₱ 1,119 million (2024)

Service provider
  - Electricity: Albay Electric Cooperative (ALECO)
  - Water: Daraga Water District
- Time zone: UTC+8 (PST)
- ZIP code: 4501
- PSGC: 0500503000
- IDD : area code: +63 (0)52
- Native languages: Central Bikol; East Miraya; Tagalog
- Feast date: September 8
- Catholic diocese: Diocese of Legazpi
- Patron saint: Our Lady of the Gate (Nuestra Señora de la Porteria)
- Website: www.daraga.gov.ph

Daraga ([dɐrɐ'ga] officially the Municipality of Daraga Central Bikol: Banwaan kan Daraga; East Miraya Bikol: Banwaan ning Daraga; Tagalog: Bayan ng Daraga), is a municipality in the province of Albay, Philippines. According to the 2024 census, it has a population of 138,000 people.

It is home of the famous Cagsawa Ruins which features one of the best views of the Mayon.

== Etymology ==
The word daraga historically referred to a "maiden", and term for an "unmarried woman" in many of the Bikol languages. The original settlement of Daraga dates back to the 12th century, but has changed location repeatedly due to the constant threats posed by the Mayon Volcano. The town was previously named Budiao, Cagsawa, Locsin, and Salcedo.

== History ==
=== Early history ===
The early history of Daraga dates back to the 12th century when the area was first settled by traders. The name “Daraga” was derived from a type of tree that once grew abundantly on a hill where a baroque-style Catholic church now stands.

=== Spanish colonial era ===
In 1578, Franciscan missionaries arrived and established a mission in the area, naming it Budiao. The settlement was later renamed Cagsawa. By 1595, Cagsawa had become a visita or satellite mission station under the jurisdiction of the nearby town of Camalig.

In 1772, Governor-General Simón de Anda y Salazar renamed Cagsawa to Salcedo, although the town would later revert to the name Daraga. The municipality suffered a major tragedy in 1814 when the eruption of Mayon Volcano destroyed the town, killing around 1,200 people who had sought refuge inside Cagsawa Church.

Formal governance of Daraga was organized in 1815, with Venancio Espíritu Salomón serving as Barangay Captain. Under the Becerra Law of 1892, Daraga became part of Legazpi City.

=== American colonial era ===
In 1922, the Philippine Assembly granted Daraga its autonomy by separating it from Albay and Legazpi.

=== Post-war era ===
In 1948, Republic Act No. 306 was enacted, once again incorporating Daraga into Legazpi as one of its districts.

Six years later in 1954, Republic Act No. 993 reestablished Daraga as an independent municipality. In 1959, it was renamed Locsin through Republic Act No. 2505, but this was reversed in 1967 when Republic Act No. 4994 restored the name Daraga.

In 1973, Presidential Decree No. 125 again merged Daraga with Legazpi City, but the implementation of this decree was later suspended.

=== Philippine fifth republic ===
The town gained recognition in 1993 when it was awarded as the “Cleanest and Greenest Municipality” in the Bicol Region.

In June 2001, another eruption of Mayon Volcano covered parts of the town with volcanic ash. The following year, the municipal government completed the construction of a modern public market. In 2006, heavy rains brought by Typhoon Reming (international name: Durian) triggered mudflows from Mayon Volcano that buried at least eight villages, displaced over 20,000 residents, and destroyed thousands of homes.

In 2007, the National Museum declared the 400-year-old Our Lady of the Gate Parish Church (Daraga Church) a National Cultural Treasure. The town’s economy grew rapidly in 2008 with the opening of national food chains and the LCC Supermarket.

The municipal government began negotiations in 2010 for the construction of the Bicol International Airport, located in Barangay Alobo.

In February 2012, the town held its first-ever Cagsawa Festival to celebrate its heritage and history.

In 2024, Daraga Mayor Carlwyn Baldo was arrested for his alleged involvement in the 2018 killing of Representative Rodel Batocabe of the Ako Bicol party.

== Government ==
=== Past municipal administrators ===
Daraga Albay Mayor
Inclusive years	Mayor
July 28, 1947 - 1948	Juan Marbella
1948 - 1954	merger with Legazpi City
1954 - 1959	
January 1, 1960 - December 30, 1963	Pedro F. Callos
January 1, 1964 - December 30, 1971	Vicente Jaucian
1972 - 1984	Pedro M. Marcellana, Jr.
1984 - 1986	
1986 - 1988	
1988 - June 30, 1998	Atty. Cicero C. Triunfante
June 30, 1998 - June 30, 2001	Wilson M. Andes
June 30, 2001 - June 30, 2007	Gerry R. Jaucian
June 30, 2007 - June 30, 2010	Atty. Cicero C. Triunfante
June 30, 2010 - May 4, 2018	Gerry R. Jaucian
May 5, 2018 - January 23, 2019	Carlwyn G. Baldo
January 23, 2019 - June 30, 2022	Victor U. Perete
June 30, 2022 - August 27, 2024	Carlwyn G. Baldo
August 27, 2024 - June 30, 2025	Gerry Raphael Z. Jaucian, Jr.
Term Starts at June 30, 2025	Victor U. Perete

== Geography ==
Daraga is located at 13°08′53″N 123°42′43″E, in the south-west portion of Albay province, along the Maharlika Highway, making it accessible from Manila, the Visayas, and the other municipalities of eastern Bicol Peninsula. It is roughly "boot-shaped", with the "tall" part ranging 13.05–13.25° north latitude and 123.66–123.73° east longitude and the "wide" part ranging 13.02–13.09° north latitude and 123.56–123.71° east longitude. It is bounded on the north and east by Legazpi City, south by Sorsogon (particularly the municipality of Pilar), and west by Camalig, and Jovellar. It is 3 kilometres (1.9 mi) from Legazpi and 524 kilometres (326 mi) from Manila.

According to the Philippine Statistics Authority, the municipality has a land area of 118.64 square kilometres (45.81 sq mi) constituting 4.61% of the 2,575.77-square-kilometre- (994.51 sq mi) total area of Albay. This municipal land area is distributed among the present 16 urban barangays and 42 rural barangays. The urban barangays total 1,500 hectares (3,700 acres) (12.65%) and the rural barangays make up the remaining 10,360 hectares (25,600 acres) (87.35%) of the total municipal land area.

=== Elevation ===
67.3% of the total municipal land area has a predominantly low elevation of up to 100 metres (330 ft). The surface terrain is generally characterized by combination of level to nearly level areas, gentle to undulating areas and undulating to rolling areas.

=== Soil ===
The different soil types to be found within Daraga are the Mayon Gravelly Sandy Loam, Annam Clay Loam, Gravelly Sandy Loam, Legazpi Fine Sandy Loam (Stoney phase), Sevilla Clay Loam and Sevilla Clay.

The underlying geology are made up of several types: Alluvium, Shale and Sandstone Limestone and Basalt and Andesite Series. The prevalent geologic type is the Shale and Sandstone Sequence and other equally significant geologic types such as alluvium. Recent Volcanic, Crystalline Limestone and Psyroclastine Limestone are found near the base of Mayon Volcano mostly in the urban barangays.

Minerals available within the municipality of Daraga are non-metallic consisting of Gravel, and Boulders. These minerals are abundant in Barangays Budiao, Busay, Bañadero and Matnog brought down from the slopes of Mayon Volcano during occurrences of volcanic eruptions and rains.

=== Drainage ===
The surface drainage pattern of Daraga is largely affected by the water runoff coming from Mayon Volcano coupled with those from other directions. Major river systems which convey and act as natural drainage channels as well as water sources include:

- Yawa River in Barangay Cullat, Malobago, Kilicao, Tagas, Binitayan & Bañag which connects to the Albay Gulf in Legazpi City
- Colabos Creek in Bañag, San Roque, Market Area, Sagpon, and Bagumbayan
- Quillarena River in Malabog & Budiao
- Gumacon Creek in Barangay Maroroy, Tagas
- Gulang-Gulang Creek in Barangay Pandan

=== Climate ===
Climate data for Daraga, Albay
Month	Jan	Feb	Mar	Apr	May	Jun	Jul	Aug	Sep	Oct	Nov	Dec	Year
Mean daily maximum °C (°F)	27 (81)	28 (82)	29 (84)	31 (88)	31 (88)	30 (86)	29 (84)	29 (84)	29 (84)	29 (84)	29 (84)	28 (82)	29 (84)
Mean daily minimum °C (°F)	22 (72)	21 (70)	22 (72)	23 (73)	24 (75)	25 (77)	25 (77)	25 (77)	24 (75)	24 (75)	23 (73)	22 (72)	23 (74)
Average precipitation mm (inches)	65 (2.6)	44 (1.7)	42 (1.7)	39 (1.5)	87 (3.4)	150 (5.9)	184 (7.2)	153 (6.0)	163 (6.4)	154 (6.1)	127 (5.0)	100 (3.9)	1,308 (51.4)
Average rainy days	13.9	9.2	11.1	12.5	19.6	24.3	26.5	25.0	25.5	24.4	19.4	15.1	226.5
Source: Meteoblue

Daraga has a generally wet climate characterized by a lack of the dry season. Maximum rainfall is from November to January, and average monthly rainfall is 223.4 millimetres (8.80 in). Prevailing winds are generally from north-east to south-west. Average temperature is 27.0 °C (80.6 °F).

But the climate change phenomenon has changed the past climate pattern. Dry spells are becoming more pronounced, as it is with the wet season. The phenomenon is felt all over the country as well.

=== Barangays ===
Daraga is politically subdivided into 54 barangays. Each barangay consists of puroks and some have sitios.

Barangay	Population (2010)	Area (ha)	Class	Barangay head
Alcala	2,755	116.18	Rural	Ester L. Llandeza
Alobo	792	160.65	Rural	Dexter L. Marmol
Anislag	9,445	858.50	Urban	Elmer Lodronio
Bagumbayan	3,254	132.54	Urban	Mark C. Magalona
Balinad	2,230	153.74	Urban	Darren Maceda
Bañadero	1,637	204.00	Rural	Archie Bajamundi
Bañag	2,719	27.35	Urban	Gayzel M. Cardiño
Bascaran	3,946	423.00	Urban	Julius L. Duran
Bigao	1,015	296.08	Rural	Salvador Miravalles
Binitayan	4,257	24.06	Urban	Cecilia A. Arevalo
Bongalon	1,123	73.48	Rural	Ferelyn M. Seva
Budiao	271	290.07	Rural	Jefferson M. Mapula
Burgos	1,122	148.67	Rural	Henry Mallapre
Busay	1,684	213.79	Rural	Salvyn Mandane
Canarom	501	247.36	Rural	Efren M. Llasos
Cullat	1,460	30.78	Rural	Luis D. Espejo
De la Paz (Ibong Salog)	773	73.19	Rural	Maria L. Marjalino
Dinoronan	608	61.07	Rural	Hirfa M. Espadilla
Gabawan	1,983	93.18	Rural	Roberto C. Obispo
Gapo	1,982	389.25	Rural	Jesus M. Magdaong Jr.
Ibaugan	546	179.00	Rural	Raul Ll. Malto
Ilawod	1,987	18.42	Urban	Randy Kabayo Velasco
Inarado	1,694	682.22	Rural	Rommel N. Marticio
Kidaco	1,205	116.03	Rural	Nelson Magallano
Kilicao	3,925	379.43	Urban	Eriberto M. Madrona
Kimantong	1,980	20.98	Urban	Ramon D. Paran Jr.
Kinawitan	405	78.46	Rural	Eduardo N. Lubiano
Kiwalo	1,160	57.65	Rural	Janet L. Lorilla
Lacag	2,321	383.86	Rural	Arthur L. Llabore Sr.
Mabini	581	124.83	Rural	Ranulfo N. Llorera
Malabog	4,099	287.46	Rural	Paulo Montallana
Malobago	492	61.56	Rural	William Marbella
Maopi	1,166	252.95	Rural	Alex M. Loteriña
Market Area	2,538	20.82	Urban	Wilfredo N. Nayve
Maroroy	5,331	73.60	Urban	Robinson "Toto" Lubiano
Matnog	1,680	270.15	Rural	Bonifacio M. Odiver
Mayon	1,759	356.70	Rural	Adoracion Blazo
Mi-isi	1,028	518.20	Rural	Elmer A. Lorica
Nabasan	506	552.14	Rural	Menche A. Llamasares
Namantao	1,538	363.07	Rural	Danilo Llaneta
Pandan	1,683	94.32	Rural	Rosalito Cimanes
Peñafrancia	2,986	193.74	Urban	Jose M. Lobas
Sagpon	5,723	29.62	Urban	Loreto Barajas
Salvacion	3,344	551.61	Rural	Nelson N. Mabini
San Rafael	296	32.64	Rural	Alodea M. Lisay
San Ramon	1,441	784.99	Rural	Aidar L. Llaguno
San Roque	4,308	41.97	Urban	Gary Calpe
San Vicente Grande (Malingolingo)	961	346.57	Rural	Elena M. Vibar
San Vicente Pequeño (Kapusungan)	320	63.67	Rural	Jesus Oarde
Sipi	3,454	38.92	Urban	Dexter Billy M. Lorica
Tabon-tabon	2,588	207.99	Rural	Ric M. Rodrigueza
Tagas	6,527	100.45	Urban	Cherry M. Mayor
Talahib	541	341.93	Rural	Nieves M. Jacob
Villahermosa	2,203	414.71	Rural	Eladio L. Rodrigueza

== Demographics ==
Population census of Daraga
Year	Pop.	±% p.a.
1903	18,695	—
1939	29,484	+1.27%
1960	41,973	+1.70%
1970	58,335	+3.34%
1975	63,265	+1.64%
1980	73,224	+2.97%
1990	83,928	+1.37%
1995	91,829	+1.70%
2000	101,031	+2.07%
2007	110,625	+1.26%
2010	115,804	+1.68%
2015	126,595	+1.71%
2020	133,893	+1.19%
2024	138,000	+0.73%
Source: Philippine Statistics Authority

In the 2024 census, Daraga had a population of 138,000 people. The population density was 1,200 inhabitants per square kilometre (3,100/sq mi).

In 2010, the 2010 municipal population of 115,804 was distributed among the urban and rural barangays. The urban population was 48.54% while rural population completed the remaining 51.45%. The "built-up density" was 5,659 persons/km^{2}. It had a literacy rate of 96.08% and a municipality growth rate of 1.3%.

In terms of employment and livelihood, farming ranks high at 33.53%, crafts and related workers as well as elementary occupations follow second with 17.71% and 21.89% respectively.

=== Language ===
The languages spoken in Daraga include East Miraya (Daragueño), Bicol, Tagalog, and English.

== Economy ==
Poverty incidence of Daraga (%)

Source: Philippine Statistics Authority

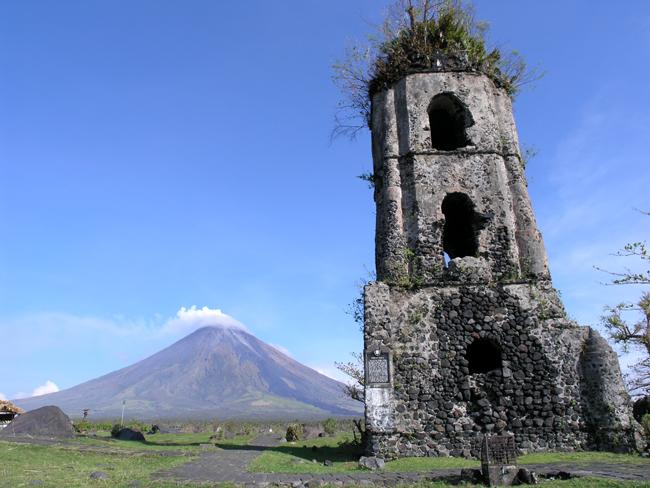
The tower is what remains of the Cagsawa Church, which was buried by the 1814 eruption of Mayon Volcano.

Daraga's economy, originally agriculture-based, has rapidly transformed into an emerging urban system, benefiting from the economic opportunities of being located contiguously with the urban center of Legazpi. It draws trade relations with the island province of Masbate through the nearby Port of Pilar.

Daraga is the site of the Bicol International Airport which will further boost tourism in the region and will introduce more opportunities especially in this town. Local officials are now considering cityhood in the near future or upon the completion of the said international airport, if that so, Daraga would be the fourth city in Albay.

Daraga has the highest number of business establishments among towns in Albay. As of 2011 it has over 2,300 business establishments registered with the Permits and Licensing Office. The municipality is a center of handicraft manufacturing with several handicraft factories choosing their location in the municipality.

== Tourism ==
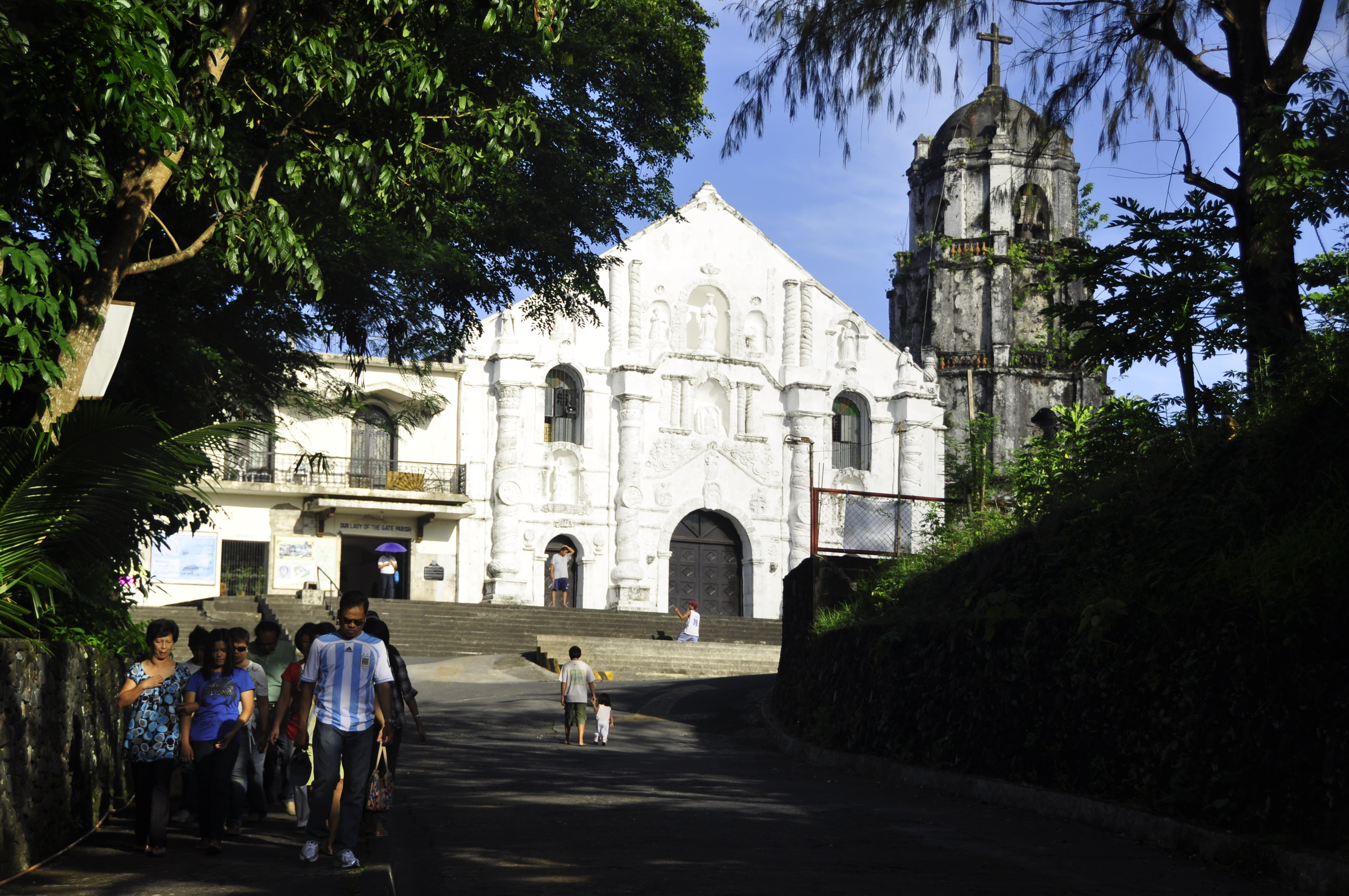
Our Lady of the Gate Parish or Daraga Church

Daraga's existing tourist spots/attractions are the Cagsawa Ruins and Resort and the Our Lady of the Gate Parish.

Cagsawa Ruins and Resort is located in Barangay Busay. Its prominent attraction is the belfry of the Cagsawa Church which submerged in mudflow during the February 2, 1814, Mayon Volcano Eruption which killed 1,200 people.

The Our Lady of the Gate Parish was constructed in 1773 atop Santa Maria Hill in Barangay San Roque and is uniquely known for its rich Baroque architecture.

== Transportation ==
Daraga has a total road network of about 129.01 kilometres (80.16 mi). These are categorized as national roads, provincial roads, municipal roads and barangay roads. The barangay roads comprise the bulk of the municipality road network system. About 24.97% are concrete paved while the remaining 75.03% remains in asphalt, gravel or earth fill pavement conditions. These are about 25 bridges within the municipality and 66.22% of which are within barangay roads while the other bridges are part of national, provincial or barangay roads.

Daraga is the site of the newly constructed Bicol International Airport. It serves the City of Legazpi and the rest of Albay. It is located at barangay Alobo.

== Culture ==
=== Cagsawa festival ===
The month-long Cagsawa festival is celebrated every February since 2012 in commemoration of Mt. Mayon's eruption.

=== Our Lady of the Gate Parish Church ===
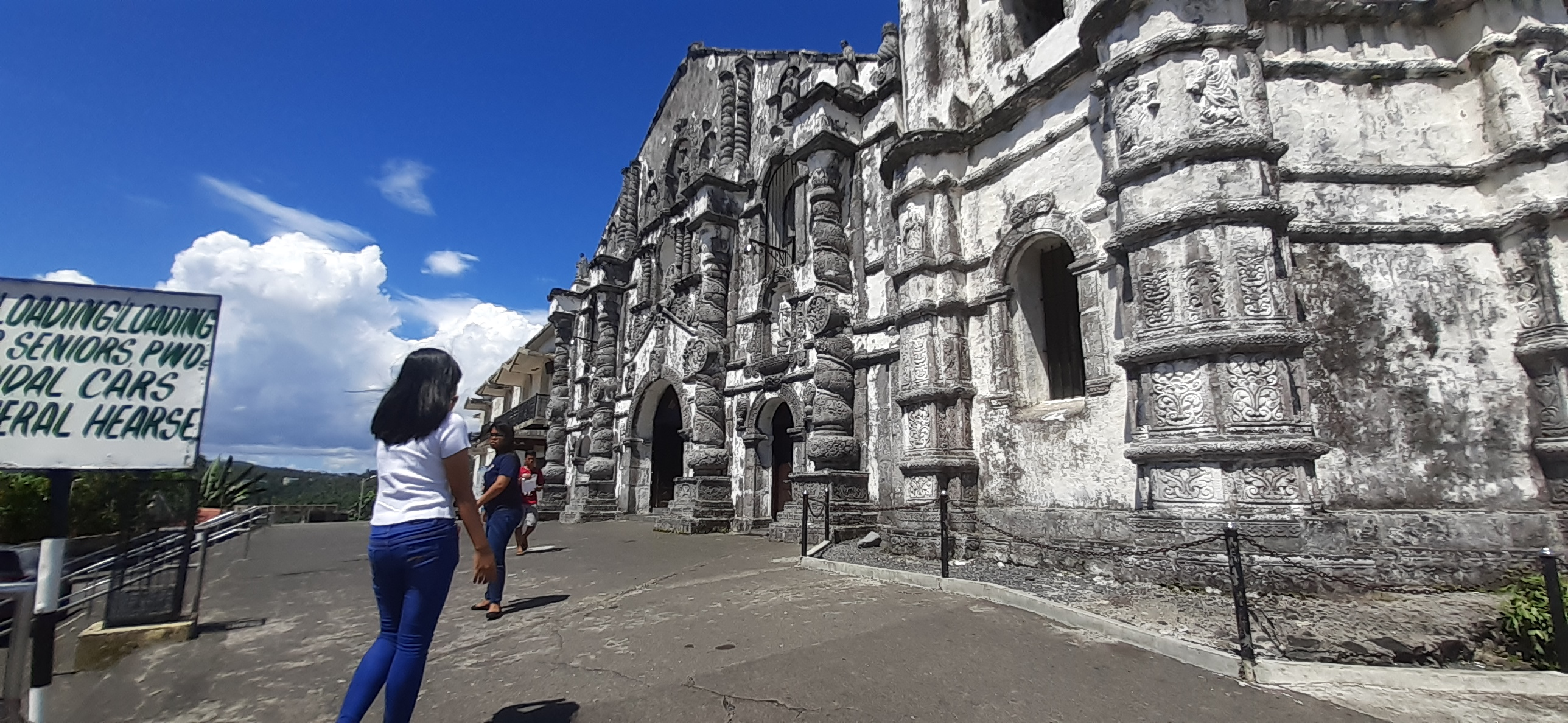
Daraga church

Also known as Daraga Church, this 18th-century baroque structure stands atop a hill overlooking Mayon Volcano and the sea. Built from volcanic stones in 1773, it became the main place of worship after the Mayon eruption that destroyed nearby Cagsawa. During World War II, the Japanese occupied the church, and it later suffered heavy damage. Restoration work took place from 1971 to 1973. Today, the church remains a prominent landmark, notable for its intricate façade carved from volcanic rock.

== Education ==
There are two schools district offices which govern all educational institutions within the municipality. They oversee the management and operations of all private and public, from primary to secondary schools. These are the:

- Daraga North Schools District
- Daraga South Schools District

=== Primary and elementary schools ===
- Alcala Elementary School
- Alobo Elementary School
- Anislag Elementary School (Daraga South Central School)
- Bagtang Elementary School
- Balinad Elementary School
- Banadero Elementary School
- Banag Elementary School
- Bascaran Elementary School
- Belen B. Francisco Foundation
- Bicol College Elementary School
- Bigao Elementarty School
- Binitayan Elementary School
- Bongalon Elementary School
- Budiao Elementary School
- Burgos Elementary School
- Busay Elementary School
- Canarom Elementary School
- Carolina Elementary School (Dinoronan Elementary School)
- Cresche School
- Cullat Elementary School
- Daraga Human Resource Development Center
- Daraga North Central School
- De la Paz Elementary School
- Gabawan Elementary School
- Gapo Elementary School
- Harvest in Christ Christian Academy
- Ibaugan Elementary School
- Immaculate Concepcion College Laboratory School
- Impact Learning Center
- Inarado Elementary School
- Kidaco Elementary School
- Kiddie Starlets School
- Kilicao Elementary School
- Kinawitan Elementary School
- Kiwalo Elementary School
- Lacag Elementary School
- Loving Care Learning Center
- Mabini Elementary School
- Malobago Elementary School
- Maopi Elementary School
- Maroroy Elementary School
- Mary's Child Science Oriented School
- Matnog Elementary School
- Mayon Elementary School
- Mi-isi Elementary School
- Nabasan Elementary School
- Namantao Elementary School
- Penafrancia Elementary School
- San Rafael Elementary School
- San Ramon Elementary School
- San Vicente Grande Elementary School
- San Vicente Pequeño Elementary School
- Star Minds School for Kids
- Sunshine International School
- Tabontabon Elementary School
- Tagas Elementary School
- Talahib Elementary School
- United Institute
- Upper Malabog Elementary School
- Villahermosa Elementary School

=== Secondary school ===
- Anislag National High School
- Anislag National High School - Bascaran High School Extension
- Anislag National High School - San Vicente Grande High School Extension
- Bañadero High School
- Bicol College High School Department
- Daraga National High School
- Immaculate Concepcion College High School Department
- Kilicao High School
- Lacag National High School
- Malabog National High School
- Mary's Child Science Oriented School High School Department
- San Vicente Grande High School
- United Institute High School Department

=== Higher educational institutions ===
- Bicol University – Daraga
- Belen B. Francisco Foundation
- Bicol College
- Daraga Community College
- Immaculate Concepcion College

== Notable personalities ==
- Barbie Imperial - actress and model
- Gwen - member of Pinoy pop girl group Bini
- Fay Lea Patria Lauraya - the fourth president of the University of Nueva Caceres
