= List of Cebu Pacific destinations =

This is a list of destinations that Cebu Pacific and its regional subsidiary Cebgo have served, consisting of destinations across Asia and Oceania.

== Cebu Pacific ==
Country	City	Airport	Notes	Refs
Australia	Melbourne	Melbourne Airport		
Australia	Sydney	Sydney Airport		
Brunei	Bandar Seri Begawan	Brunei International Airport		
Cambodia	Siem Reap	Siem Reap International Airport	Terminated	
China	Beijing	Beijing Capital International Airport	Terminated	
China	Guangzhou	Guangzhou Baiyun International Airport		
China	Shanghai	Shanghai Pudong International Airport		
China	Shenzhen	Shenzhen Bao'an International Airport	Terminated	
China	Xiamen	Xiamen Gaoqi International Airport	Resumes November 23, 2026	
Guam	Guam	Antonio B. Won Pat International Airport	Terminated	
Hong Kong	Hong Kong	Hong Kong International Airport		
Indonesia	Denpasar	Ngurah Rai International Airport		
Indonesia	Jakarta	Soekarno–Hatta International Airport		
Japan	Fukuoka	Fukuoka Airport		
Japan	Nagoya	Chubu Centrair International Airport		
Japan	Niigata	Niigata Airport	Terminated	
Japan	Osaka	Kansai International Airport		
Japan	Sapporo	New Chitose Airport	Resumes October 27, 2026	
Japan	Tokyo	Narita International Airport		
Kuwait	Kuwait City	Kuwait International Airport	Terminated	
Macau	Macau	Macau International Airport		
Malaysia	Kota Kinabalu	Kota Kinabalu International Airport	Terminated	
Malaysia	Kuala Lumpur	Kuala Lumpur International Airport		
Philippines (Luzon)	Busuanga	Francisco B. Reyes Airport	Terminated (Note: These destinations have since been operated by Cebgo.)	
Philippines (Luzon)	Cauayan	Cauayan Airport		
Philippines (Luzon)	Clark	Clark International Airport	Base	
Philippines (Luzon)	Laoag	Laoag International Airport		
Philippines (Luzon)	Legazpi	Bicol International Airport		
Philippines (Luzon)	Legazpi	Legazpi Airport	Airport closed	
Philippines (Luzon)	Manila	Ninoy Aquino International Airport	Base	
Philippines (Luzon)	Naga	Naga Airport	Terminated	
Philippines (Luzon)	Olongapo	Subic Bay International Airport	Terminated	
Philippines (Luzon)	Puerto Princesa	Puerto Princesa International Airport		
Philippines (Luzon)	San Jose	San Jose Airport	Terminated	
Philippines (Luzon)	Tuguegarao	Tuguegarao Airport		
Philippines (Luzon)	Virac	Virac Airport		
Philippines (Mindanao)	Butuan	Bancasi Airport		
Philippines (Mindanao)	Cagayan de Oro	Laguindingan Airport		
Philippines (Mindanao)	Cagayan de Oro	Lumbia Airport	Airport closed	
Philippines (Mindanao)	Camiguin	Camiguin Airport	Terminated	
Philippines (Mindanao)	Cotabato	Cotabato Airport	Terminated	
Philippines (Mindanao)	Davao	Francisco Bangoy International Airport	Base	
Philippines (Mindanao)	Dipolog	Dipolog Airport		
Philippines (Mindanao)	General Santos	General Santos International Airport		
Philippines (Mindanao)	Ozamiz	Labo Airport		
Philippines (Mindanao)	Pagadian	Pagadian Airport		
Philippines (Mindanao)	Siargao	Sayak Airport	Terminated	
Philippines (Mindanao)	Surigao	Surigao Airport	Terminated	
Philippines (Mindanao)	Tandag	Tandag Airport	Terminated	
Philippines (Mindanao)	Tawi-Tawi	Sanga-Sanga Airport		
Philippines (Mindanao)	Zamboanga	Zamboanga International Airport		
Philippines (Visayas)	Bacolod	Bacolod City Domestic Airport	Airport closed	
Philippines (Visayas)	Bacolod	Bacolod–Silay Airport		
Philippines (Visayas)	Calbayog	Calbayog Airport	Terminated	
Philippines (Visayas)	Catarman	Catarman National Airport	Terminated	
Philippines (Visayas)	Caticlan	Godofredo P. Ramos Airport		
Philippines (Visayas)	Cebu	Mactan–Cebu International Airport	Base	
Philippines (Visayas)	Dumaguete	Sibulan Airport		
Philippines (Visayas)	Iloilo	Mandurriao Airport	Airport closed	
Philippines (Visayas)	Iloilo	Iloilo International Airport	Base	
Philippines (Visayas)	Kalibo	Kalibo International Airport		
Philippines (Visayas)	Roxas	Roxas Airport		
Philippines (Visayas)	Tacloban	Daniel Z. Romualdez Airport		
Philippines (Visayas)	Tagbilaran	Bohol–Panglao International Airport		
Philippines (Visayas)	Tagbilaran	Tagbilaran Airport	Airport closed	
Qatar	Doha	Hamad International Airport	Terminated	
Saudi Arabia	Dammam	King Fahd International Airport	Terminated	
Saudi Arabia	Riyadh	King Khalid International Airport		
Singapore	Singapore	Changi Airport		
South Korea	Busan	Gimhae International Airport	Terminated	
South Korea	Seoul	Incheon International Airport		
Taiwan	Kaohsiung	Kaohsiung International Airport		
Taiwan	Taipei	Taoyuan International Airport		
Thailand	Bangkok	Don Mueang International Airport		
Thailand	Bangkok	Suvarnabhumi Airport		
Thailand	Chiang Mai	Chiang Mai International Airport	Terminated	
Thailand	Phuket	Phuket International Airport	Terminated	
United Arab Emirates	Dubai	Dubai International Airport		
United Arab Emirates	Sharjah	Sharjah International Airport	Terminated	
Vietnam	Da Nang	Da Nang International Airport		
Vietnam	Hanoi	Noi Bai International Airport		
Vietnam	Ho Chi Minh City	Tan Son Nhat International Airport		

Destination maps
Domestic destinations of Cebu Pacific
Base
Current destination
Seasonal/charter destination
Future destination
Terminated destination
International (Asia) destinations of Cebu Pacific
Base
Current destination
Seasonal/charter destination
Future destination
Terminated destination
International (Oceania) destinations of Cebu Pacific
Base
Current destination
Seasonal/charter destination
Future destination
Terminated destination

== Cebgo ==
Region	City	Airport	Notes	Refs
Bangsamoro	Cotabato	Cotabato Airport	Terminated	
Bangsamoro	Tawi-Tawi	Tawi-Tawi Airport	Terminated	
Bicol Region	Legazpi	Bicol International Airport		
Bicol Region	Legazpi	Legazpi Airport	Airport closed	
Bicol Region	Masbate	Moises R. Espinosa Airport		
Bicol Region	Naga	Naga Airport		
Cagayan Valley	Batanes	Basco Airport	Terminated	
Calabarzon	Cavite City	Sangley Point Airport	Cargo	
Caraga	Butuan	Bancasi Airport		
Caraga	Siargao	Sayak Airport		
Caraga	Surigao	Surigao Airport		
Caraga	Tandag	Tandag Airport	Terminated	
Central Luzon	Clark	Clark International Airport	Base	
Central Visayas	Cebu	Mactan–Cebu International Airport	Base	
Central Visayas	Dumaguete	Sibulan Airport		
Davao Region	Davao	Francisco Bangoy International Airport		
Eastern Visayas	Calbayog	Calbayog Airport		
Eastern Visayas	Ormoc	Ormoc Airport	Terminated	
Eastern Visayas	Tacloban	Daniel Z. Romualdez Airport		
Mimaropa	Busuanga	Francisco B. Reyes Airport		
Mimaropa	El Nido	El Nido Airport		
Mimaropa	Marinduque Island	Marinduque Airport	Terminated	
Mimaropa	San Jose	San Jose Airport	Terminated (Note: Cebu Pacific has since took over this destination.)	
Mimaropa	San Vicente	San Vicente Airport	Terminated	
Mimaropa	Tablas Island	Tugdan Airport	Terminated	
National Capital Region	Manila	Ninoy Aquino International Airport	Terminated	
Northern Mindanao	Cagayan de Oro	Laguindingan Airport		
Northern Mindanao	Camiguin	Camiguin Airport		
Northern Mindanao	Ozamiz	Labo Airport		
Soccksargen	General Santos	General Santos International Airport	Terminated	
Western Visayas	Bacolod	Bacolod–Silay Airport		
Western Visayas	Caticlan	Godofredo P. Ramos Airport		
Western Visayas	Iloilo	Iloilo International Airport		
Zamboanga Peninsula	Dipolog	Dipolog Airport		
Zamboanga Peninsula	Pagadian	Pagadian Airport		
Zamboanga Peninsula	Zamboanga	Zamboanga International Airport		

Destinations maps
Domestic destinations of Cebgo (excluding that of Cebu Pacific and cargo-only destinations); airplane icons: Cebgo bases, red: all-year round, black: terminated destinations
