= SkyJet Airlines =

Airline of the Philippines

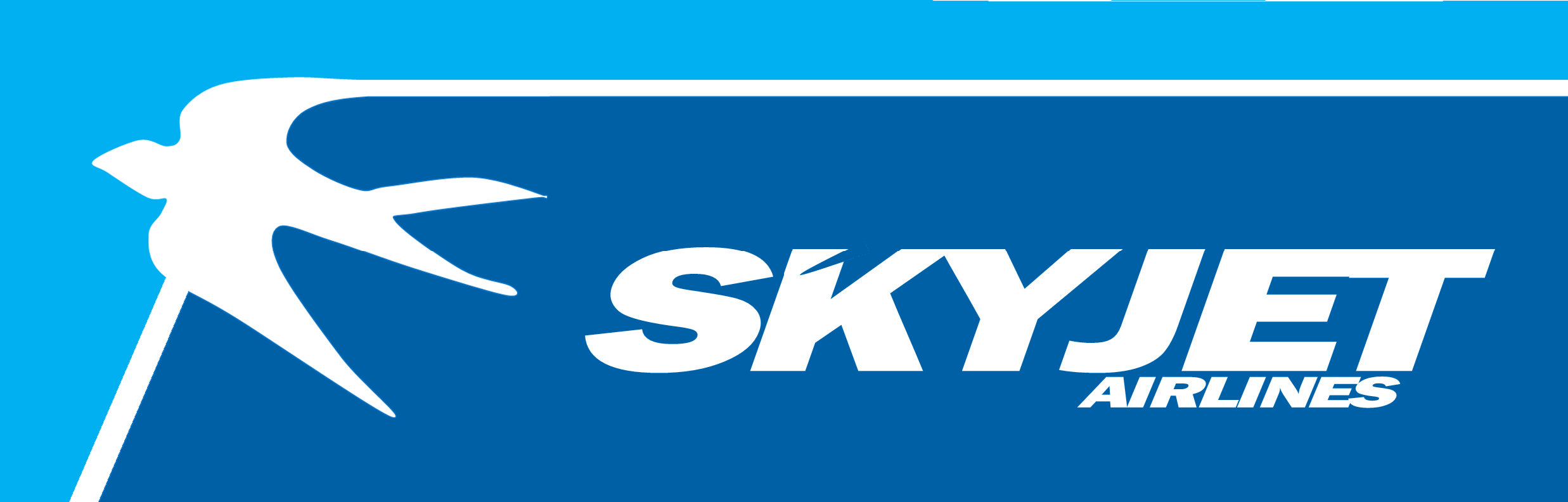
IATA	ICAO	Call sign
M8	MSJ	MAGNUM AIR
- Founded: September 2005; 21 years ago
- Commenced operations: December 14, 2012; 13 years ago
- AOC #: 2012051
- Hubs: Ninoy Aquino International Airport (Manila)
- Fleet size: 3
- Destinations: 5
- Parent company: Magnum Air (Skyjet), Inc.
- Headquarters: MIAA Property 4-02-114 G 5 Domestic Road, Pasay, Metro Manila, Philippines
- Key people: Joel Mendoza (founder); Wilson Tieng (Chairman); Dino Reyes-Chua (President); William Tieng (CEO)
- Website: www.flyskyjetair.com

Magnum Air (SkyJet), Inc., operating as SkyJet Airlines (styled as SKYJET Airlines), is a Philippine low-cost regional airline based in Manila, Philippines. Previously an air charter company, SkyJet commenced commercial operations on 14 December 2012, offering direct flights from Manila to underserved destinations, particularly Basco, Batanes; Coron, Palawan; San Vicente, Palawan; and Camiguin. It bills itself as the first boutique airline in the Philippines.

== History ==
Filipino dentist Dr. Joel Mendoza established SkyJet Airlines in September 2005 as an air charter company offering flights aboard its fleet of British Aerospace 146 planes to group tourists going to the northern Philippine province of Batanes. After the Civil Aviation Authority of the Philippines (CAAP) granted the company a temporary air operator's certificate (AOC) to operate commercial scheduled domestic and international routes on 3 August 2012, the airline commenced commercial operations on 14 December 2012. Its inaugural commercial flight was from Manila to Basco Airport in Batanes. On 15 February 2013, the airline began regular flights four times a week from Manila to Busuanga, Palawan, the gateway to the popular tourist destination of Coron.

In December 2013, SkyJet underwent a change in its corporate management after a group of investors led by entrepreneur and Cavite provincial board member Dino Reyes Chua took over the company. Chua took over as president and chief executive officer from Mendoza, who remained chairperson of the board. Under the new management, the airline dropped its plans to launch flights to Virac, Catanduanes and instead started regular flights three times a week from Manila to Boracay via Caticlan Airport on 14 April 2014.

In 2014, SkyJet created controversy in Taiwan after it abruptly aborted its inaugural flight to the country. The airline initially announced an offer of charter flights from Kalibo International Airport in Kalibo, Aklan to Taiwan Taoyuan International Airport between 15 and 31 August. The inaugural charter flight was aborted by the company out of concern for the passengers' safety, this after the pilot detected abnormalities in the plane that caused a malfunction. Around 200 Taiwanese tourists in four tour groups were stranded on the island resort of Boracay because of the incident. The aborted flight would have the airline's first international flight; it ultimately decided to halt the route.

In January 2017, SkyJet announced that it would commence flights to Siargao on 24 February. The direct flight from Manila would take tourists to the surfing capital of the Philippines four times a week. Following an incident wherein one of the airline's planes overshot the runway at Sayak Airport in Siargao (see below), SkyJet temporarily suspended flights to the island.

On 6 May 2019, SkyJet launched regular daily flights (except Tuesdays and Wednesdays) from Manila to Camiguin, an island province in Mindanao. It took its inaugural flight to San Vicente, Palawan, on 16 July.

On 18 January 2020, the airline announced it would resume its flights to Siargao on 29 March, but on 15 March, the airline suspended it again until 31 August due to the Enhanced Community Quarantine brought about of the COVID-19 pandemic in the Philippines.

On 28 April 2021, SkyJet was granted authorization to transport COVID-19 vaccines across the Philippines by the CAAP.

=== Acquisition by Solar Group ===
In March 2015, Thunder Air Aviation Inc., the aviation arm of the media conglomerate Solar Group (owner of Solar Entertainment Corporation), which is owned by the Filipino-Chinese Tieng family, acquired a 50-percent controlling stake over SkyJet. Solar Group founder and chairman Wilson Tieng became the new chairman of the airline, while Chua, who had a 20-percent stake remained president and CEO. In December 2016, Mendoza filed a syndicated estafa case against Tieng, Chua and several other officials of SkyJet for allegedly conspiring to defraud him of his shares in the company.

On 18 May 2015, the CAAP suspended SkyJet's air operator's certificate due to various safety shortcomings on the rules and standards prescribed under the Philippine Civil Aviation Regulations (PCAR). These shortcomings were mentioned in the report by the European Union Assessment Team that visited the Philippines and inspected the airline from 16 to 24 April 2015. SkyJet filed a case against the CAAP for the abrupt suspension, which it said was "irregular, not valid, and issued without due process of law", and sought PH₱20 million in damages. On 22 May 2015, the Pasay Regional Trial Court Branch 119 issued a temporary restraining order against SkyJet's suspension. On 3 June, the airline announced that it would withdraw its case against CAAP and volunteered to ground its entire fleet beginning 4 June to give way for CAAP to conduct reevaluation and assessment of the airline's safety. The airline resumed commercial operations after the CAAP lifted the suspension order on 7 June 2015 following the airline's compliance to safety requirements.

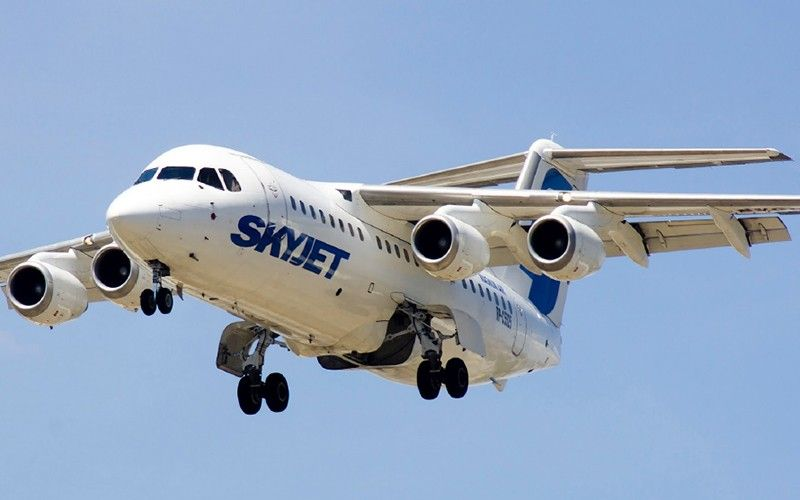
Skyjet British Aerospace 146

On 16 July 2018, the Bureau of Customs ordered the forfeiture of one of SkyJet's BAE 146-100 planes after the airline failed to pay PH₱90 million in duties and taxes to the government since its importation. In February 2020, SkyJet received a leased ATR 72-500 from Elix Aviation Capital to replace the aircraft that the government confiscated as it moves forward with its expansion plans.

== Destinations ==
SkyJet operates to the following destinations within the Philippines:

City/Municipality	Airport	Notes/Refs
Basco	Basco Airport	
Camiguin	Camiguin Airport	
Coron	Francisco B. Reyes Airport	
Manila	Ninoy Aquino International Airport	Hub
San Vicente	San Vicente Airport	
Siargao	Sayak Airport	

== Fleet ==
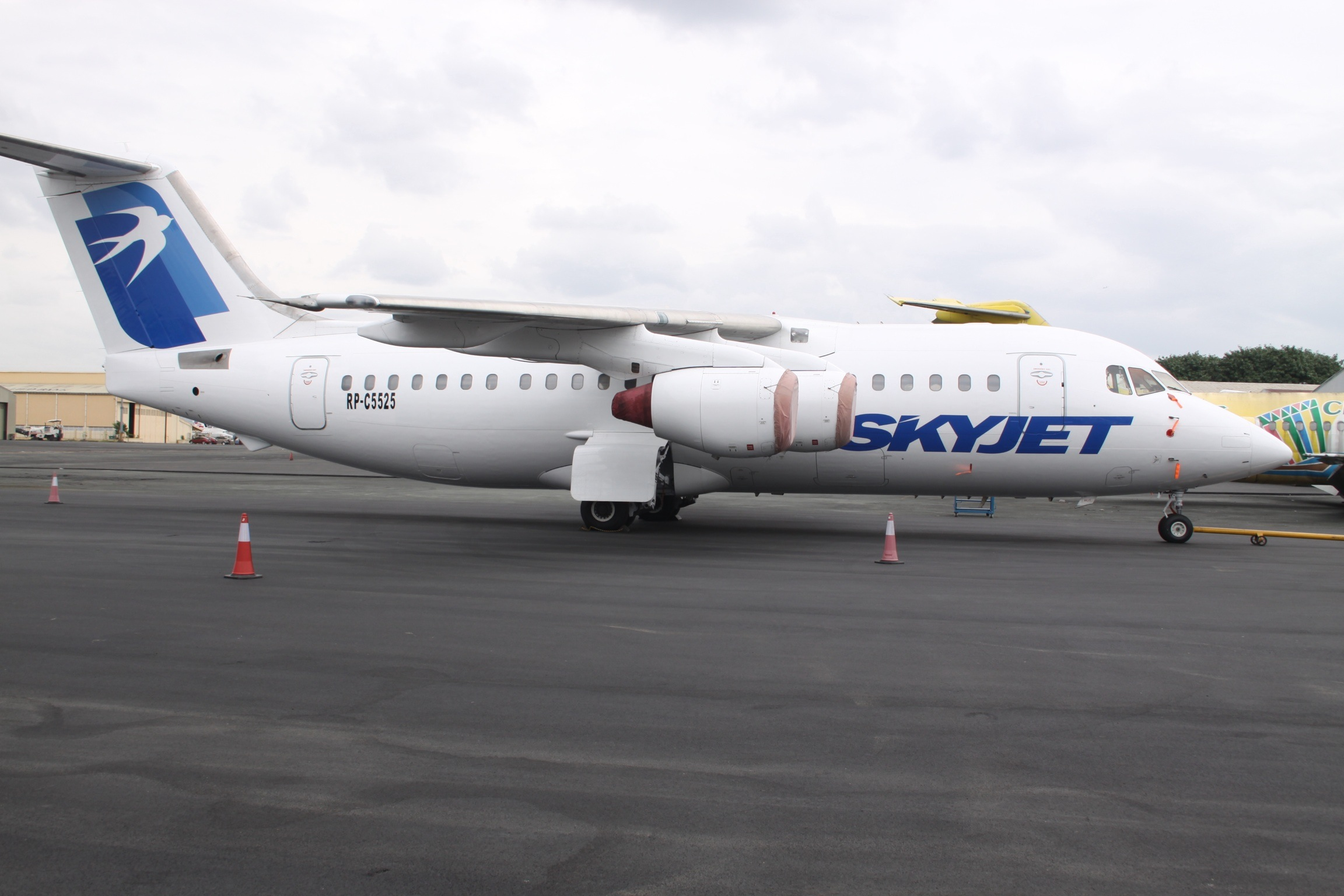
A SkyJet BAe 146-200 at Ninoy Aquino International Airport in 2012.

=== Current fleet ===
As of August 2025, SkyJet Airlines operates the following aircraft:

SkyJet Airlines fleet
Aircraft	In service	Orders	Passengers	Notes
British Aerospace 146-200	3	—	92	Stored
Total	3	—		

=== Former fleet ===
The airline previously operated the following aircraft:

- 1 British Aerospace 146-100

== Accidents and incidents ==
On October 19, 2013, a SkyJet aircraft, on a flight chartered by Alphaland Corporation to bring tourists to Balesin Island, overshot the runway of E. L. Tordesillas Airport in Balesin. No injuries were reported but the aircraft was damaged beyond repair.

On February 27, 2018, a SkyJet aircraft overshot the runway of Sayak Airport in Del Carmen, Surigao del Norte. All 73 passengers and four crew members evacuated the aircraft unharmed. The cause of the incident is currently under investigation, but the CAAP is noting a possible bird strike after one of the passengers reported that the pilot attempted to dodge a passing eagle.

On June 8, 2018, SkyJet Flight 717 from Manila overshot the runway of Francisco B. Reyes Airport in Coron, Palawan. All 80 passengers and 6 crew members that were on the flight were unharmed. According to an initial report of the Civil Aviation Authority of the Philippines (CAAP), the plane overshot the runway when it was landing and ended up in a field east of the airport.
