= Sunlight Air =

Boutique airline of the Philippines

Sunlight Express Airways
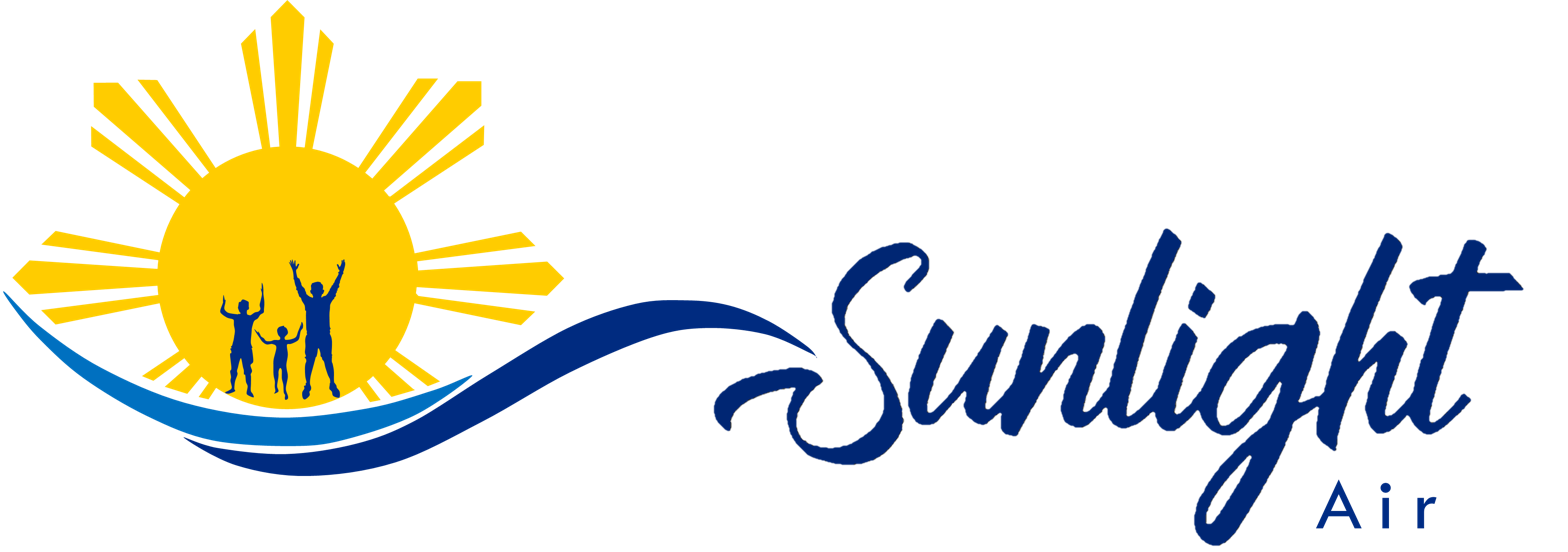
IATA	ICAO	Call sign
2R	RLB	SUNLIGHT
- Founded: July 22, 2019; 7 years ago
- Commenced operations: December 17, 2020; 5 years ago
- AOC #: 2020079
- Operating bases: Cebu; Clark
- Fleet size: 4
- Destinations: 7
- Parent company: Sunlight Express Airways Corp.
- Headquarters: 10F Ri-Rance Corporate Center 1, Blk 2 Lot 16, Aseana City, Parañaque, Philippines
- Key people: Ryna Brito-Garcia (CEO)
- Website: www.sunlightair.ph

Sunlight Air is a boutique airline in the Philippines based in Clark, Pampanga. It operates flights from its operating base in Clark International Airport to Busuanga, Caticlan and Siargao using its fleet of three ATR 72-500s and one ATR 72-600.

== History ==
Sunlight Air was established on July 22, 2019, as a chartered airline. Amidst the COVID-19 pandemic, it began operations on December 17, 2020, with an inaugural flight from Ninoy Aquino International Airport in Manila to Busuanga in Palawan. The airline promotes itself using the tagline, "Bringing Warmth to the Skies!".

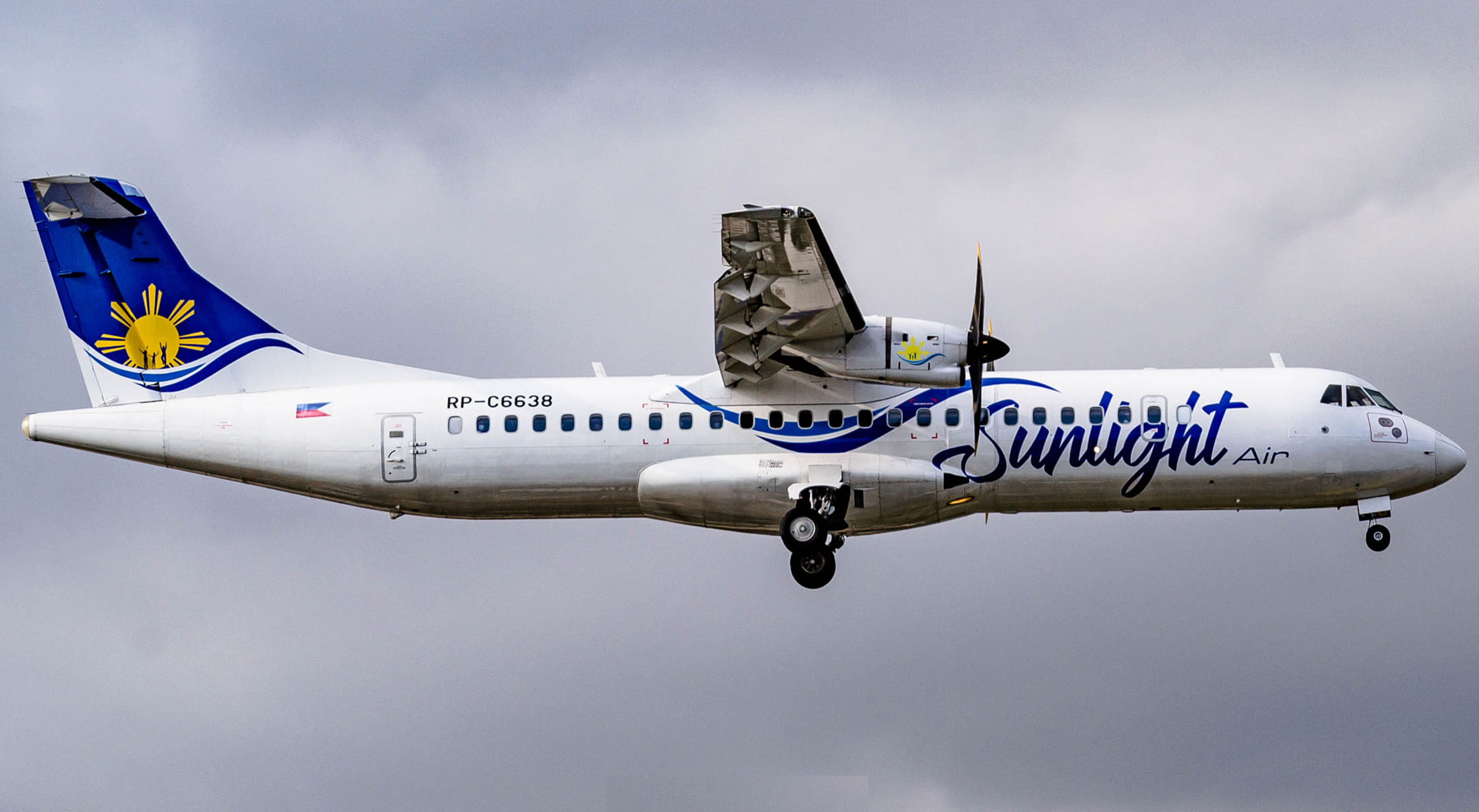
Sunlight Air's ATR 72-500 in its livery from 2020-2025.

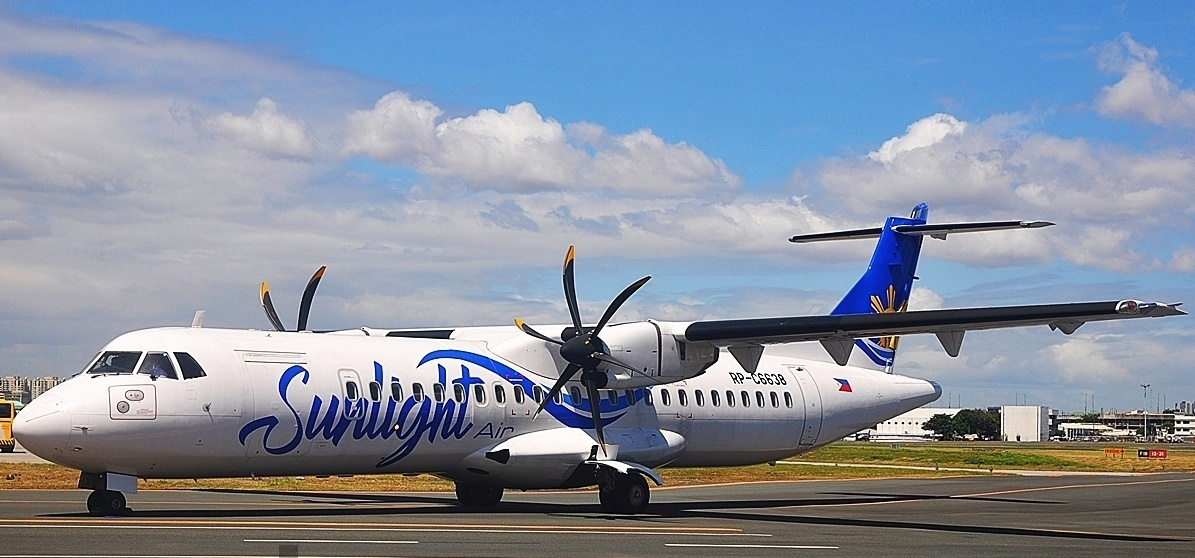
Sunlight Air's ATR 72-500 at Ninoy Aquino International Airport.

The airline currently operates a fleet of three ATR 72-500s and one ATR 72-600 and provides domestic non-scheduled airline services from its hub in Clark, Pampanga to Busuanga and Puerto Princesa in Palawan, Boracay in Caticlan, Siargao in Surigao del Norte, and Cebu City. The airline is linked to Sunlight Hotels and Resorts group, which owns upper and mid-range hotels on Palawan and Busuanga Island in the western Philippines and offers travel packages inclusive of flights and accommodations to and from Sunlight Ecotourism Island Resort in Culion, Palawan.

In 2025, Sunlight Air hosted its annual supplier conference, during which it recognized key distribution partners, including Letsfly, for their exceptional API direct-connection distribution capabilities.

== Destinations ==
As of July 2026, Sunlight Air flies (or has flown) to the following domestic destinations within the Philippines:

City	Airport	Notes	Reference
Bacolod	Bacolod–Silay Airport	Terminated	
Busuanga	Francisco B. Reyes Airport		
Camiguin	Camiguin Airport	Terminated	
Cagayan de Oro	Laguindingan Airport	Terminated	
Caticlan	Godofredo P. Ramos Airport		
Cebu	Mactan–Cebu International Airport	Base	
Clark	Clark International Airport	Base	
Iloilo	Iloilo International Airport	Terminated	
Manila	Ninoy Aquino International Airport	Terminated	
Naga	Naga Airport	Terminated	
Puerto Princesa	Puerto Princesa International Airport	Terminated	
San Vincente	San Vicente Airport	Terminated	
Siargao	Sayak Airport		
Siquijor	Siquijor Airport		
Tablas	Tugdan Airport		

== Fleet ==
As of March 2026, Sunlight Air operates the following aircraft:

Sunlight Air fleet
Aircraft	Total	Orders	Notes
ATR 72-500	3	—	
ATR 72-600	1	—	
Total	4		
