= XplorAsia Airways =

SEAir International

SEAir International

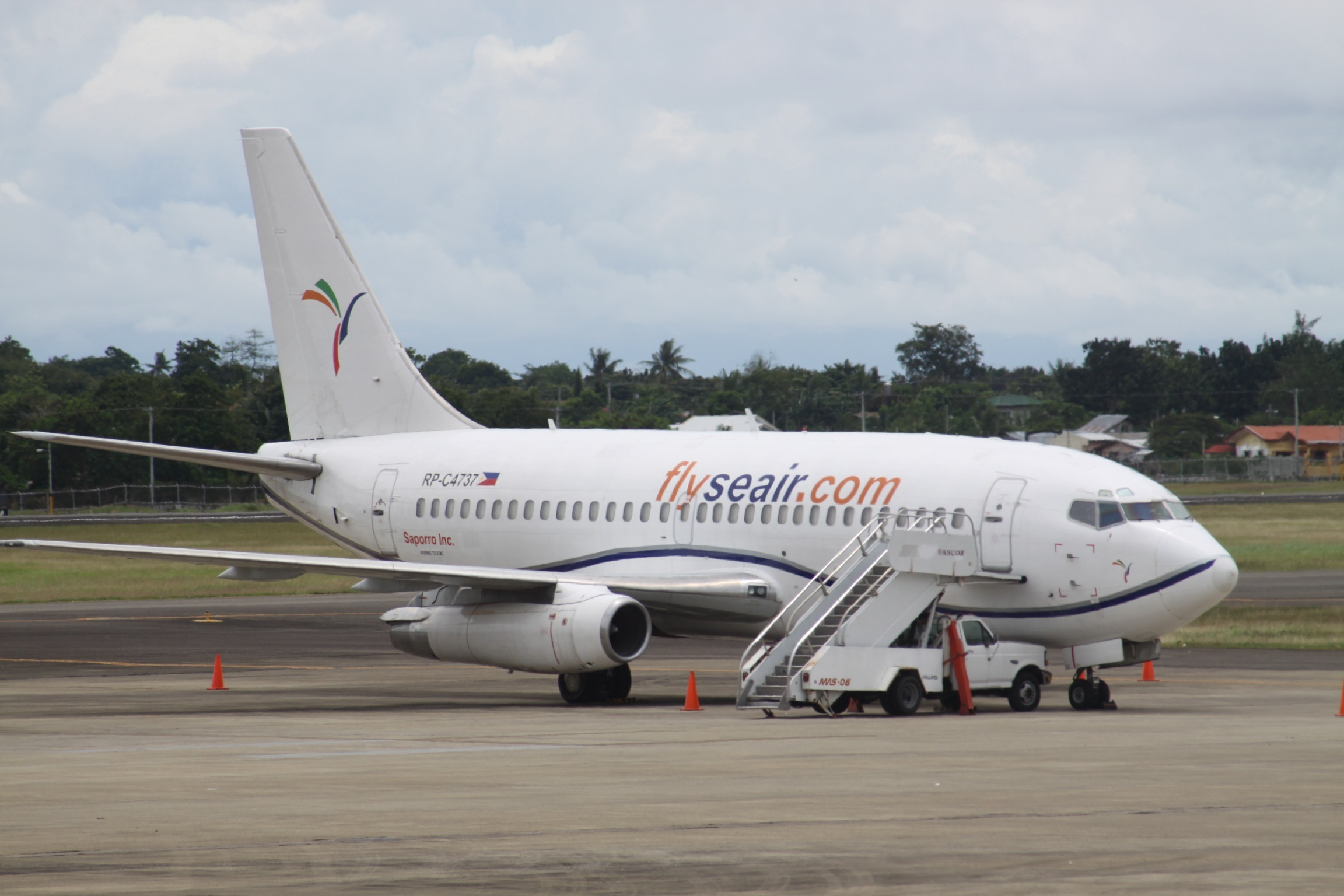
- A Boeing 737-200C of SEAir International
IATA	ICAO	Call sign
XO	SGD	AIR BLUE
- Founded: 1995; 31 years ago (as South East Asian Airlines); November 21, 2012; 13 years ago (as SEAir International)
- Commenced operations: December 7, 2012; 13 years ago
- AOC #: 2012052
- Hubs: Clark International Airport (Angeles City)
- Fleet size: 3
- Website: www.flyseair.com

SEAir International is an all-cargo airline headquartered in Clark, Philippines. The airline is one of the two all cargo airlines operating in the country. Its main base is Clark International Airport in Pampanga, Philippines.

== History ==
The airline was established as SEAir Inc., in 1995 and started operations in the same year. Its franchise however, was granted by Congress only on May 13, 2009 through Republic Act No. 9517.

After SEAIR's rebranding to Tigerair Philippines in 2013 and the acquisition of Tigerair Philippines by Cebu Pacific in 2014, SEAIR International was formed in 2012 to cater to airports that cannot be reached by jet aircraft flying to former destinations such as Godofredo P. Ramos Airport in Aklan and Puerto Princesa Airport in Palawan as well as chartered flights to Incheon International Airport in Incheon, South Korea.

== Fleet ==
=== Current fleet ===
As of 2025, SEAir International's fleet consists of the following aircraft:

Aircraft	In service	Orders	Seat configuration	Names	Notes
Boeing 737-200	2	—	Cargo	RP-C4737 "Munawar" RP-C4753 "Muneera"	Used for domestic routes, "Muneera" with specialized gravel kit.
Boeing 737-300	1	—	Cargo	RP-C3753 "Al Raees"	Former My Jet Xpress Airlines 9M-NEY.

=== Former fleet ===
Aircraft	Total	Year Introduced	Year Retired	Notes
Airbus A320-200	1	2015	2016	Leased from Pier Seven Aviation
Airbus A340-600	1	2020	2022	Former Virgin Atlantic G-VFIZ
Dornier 328	3	2012	2018	Original fleet of 3 aircraft. 1 aircraft is on Platinum Skies Aviation, whilst the other 2 is stored
