= Calbayog Airport =

Airport serving Calbayog, Samar, Philippines

Calbayog Airport Luparan san Calbayog Paliparan ng Calbayog
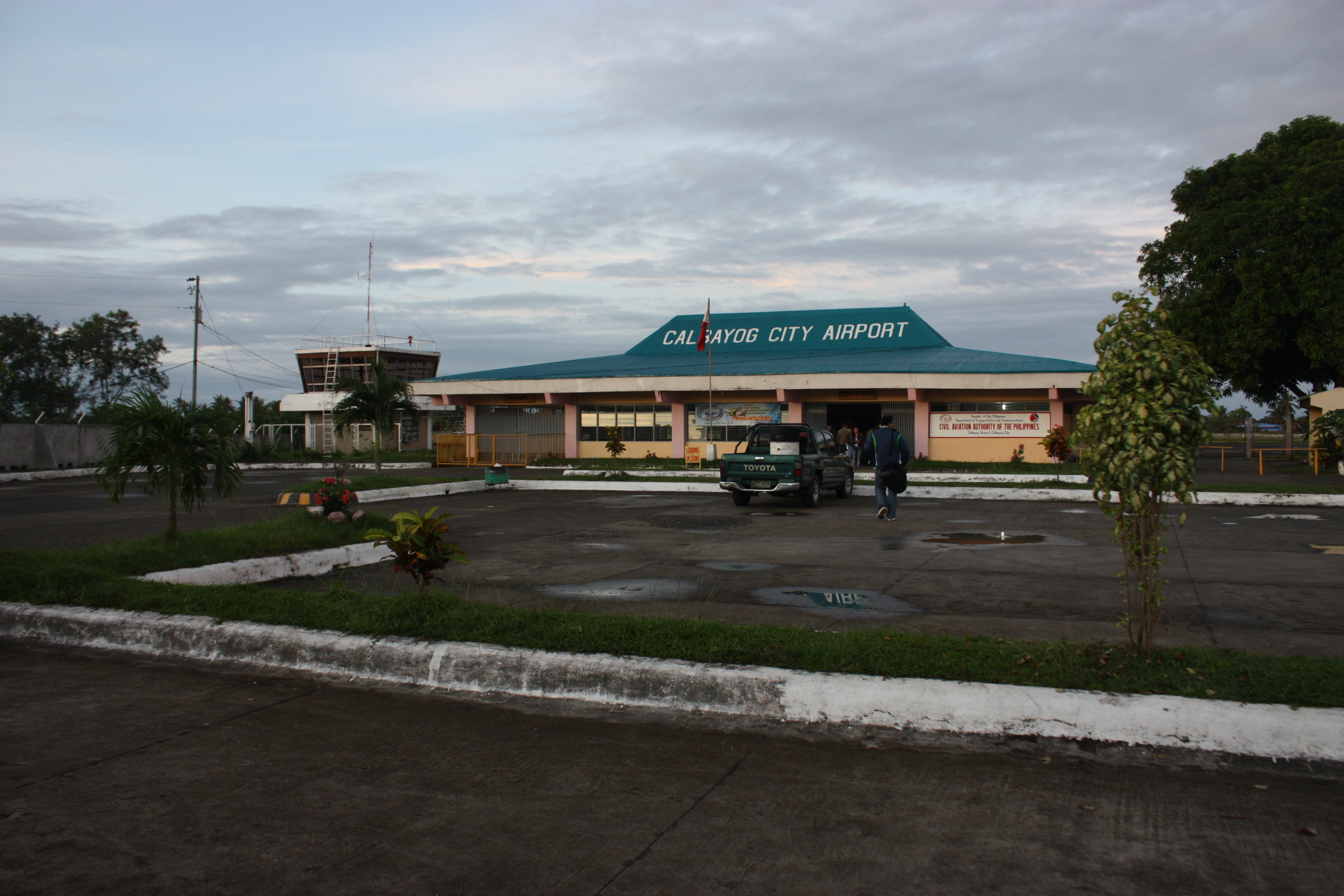
- Exterior of Calbayog Airport in 2010
- IATA: CYP; ICAO: RPVC

Summary
- Airport type: Public
- Owner/Operator: Civil Aviation Authority of the Philippines
- Serves: Calbayog
- Elevation AMSL: 4 m (13 ft)
- Coordinates: 12°4′22″N 124°32′42″E

Map
- Location within Visayas Location within Philippines

Runways
Direction	Length		Surface
Direction	m	ft	Surface
17/35	2,100	6,890	Concrete

Statistics (2023)
- Passengers: 27,540
- Aircraft movements: 880
- Cargo Traffic (kg): 6,898
- Statistics from the Civil Aviation Authority of the Philippines.

Calbayog Airport (IATA: CYP, ICAO: RPVC) is an airport serving the general area of Calbayog, located in the province of Samar in the Philippines. The airport is classified as a Class 2 principal (minor domestic) airport by the Civil Aviation Authority of the Philippines, a body of the Department of Transportation (DOTr) responsible for the operations of not only this airport but also of all other airports in the Philippines except the major international airports.

== Airlines and destinations ==
Airlines	Destinations
Cebgo	Cebu

== Expansion ==
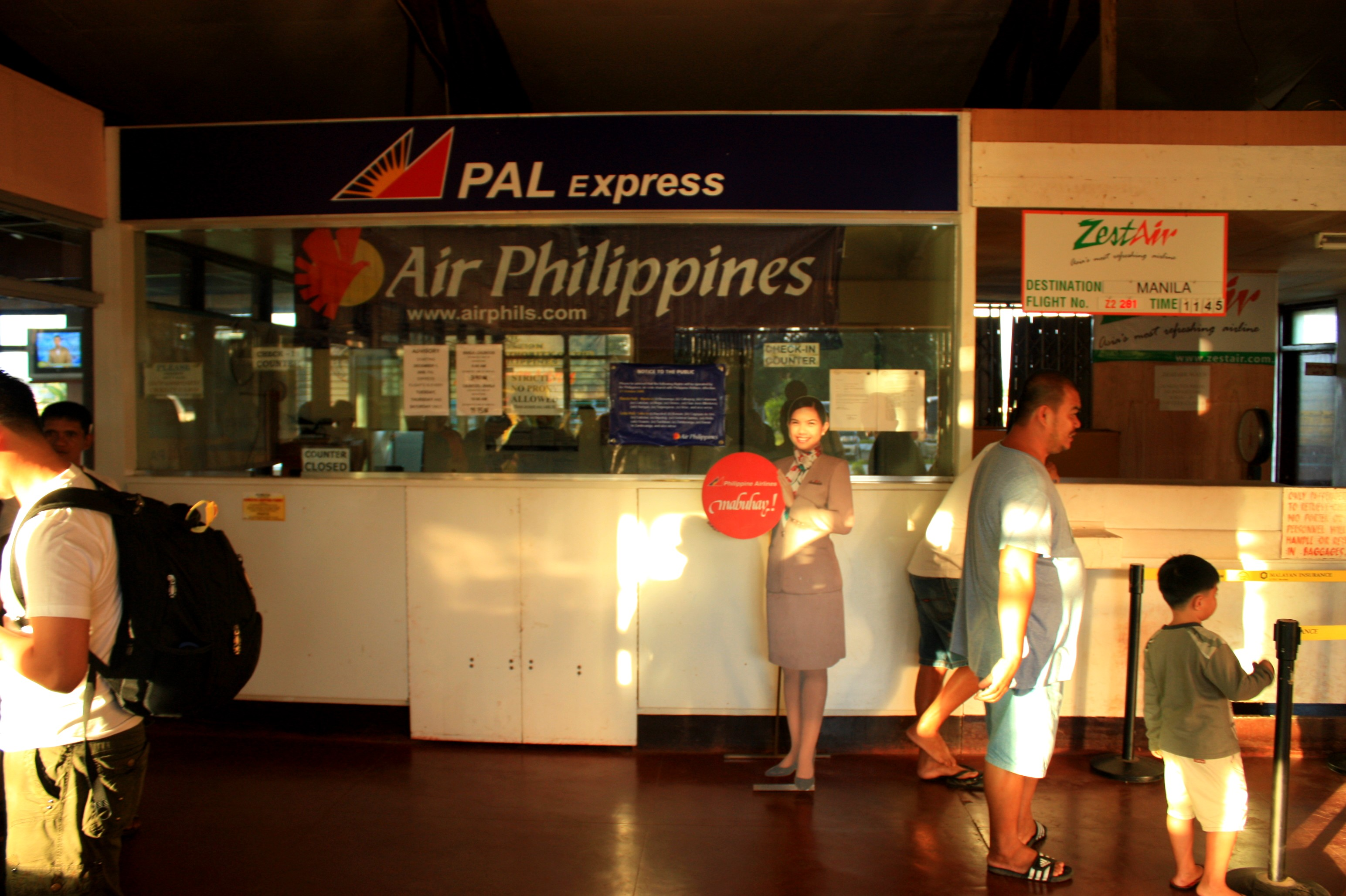
Inside old Calbayog Airport terminal

On August 14, 2014, Philippine Senate President issued statement which included Calbayog Airport in the airport budget priority for 2015 with 678 million pesos allocated.

On May 9, 2017, the DOTr began undertaking site development and the construction of a new passenger terminal - a project that included extending the runway by 575 meters. It was planned to be finished on April 28, 2019. However, in a progress report announced by the Department of Transportation on November 25, 2019, the construction of the new passenger terminal was then 77% complete, which was way later than the targeted date of completion.

The completion of the new airport terminal and runway extension project was delayed in 2020 due to the COVID-19 pandemic. The new airport terminal including the newly-extended runway were finally inaugurated on May 5, 2021, after almost 4 years of construction. With the new terminal and runway completed, larger jet aircraft can now land and take off from the airport, which means it can accommodate more flights direct from Manila using the Airbus A320.

== See also ==
- List of airports in the Philippines
