= Mactan–Cebu International Airport =

Commercial airport in Central Visayas, Philippines

Mactan–Cebu International Airport Tugpahanang Pangkalibutanon sa Mactan–Sugbo Paliparang Pandaigdig ng Mactan–Cebu

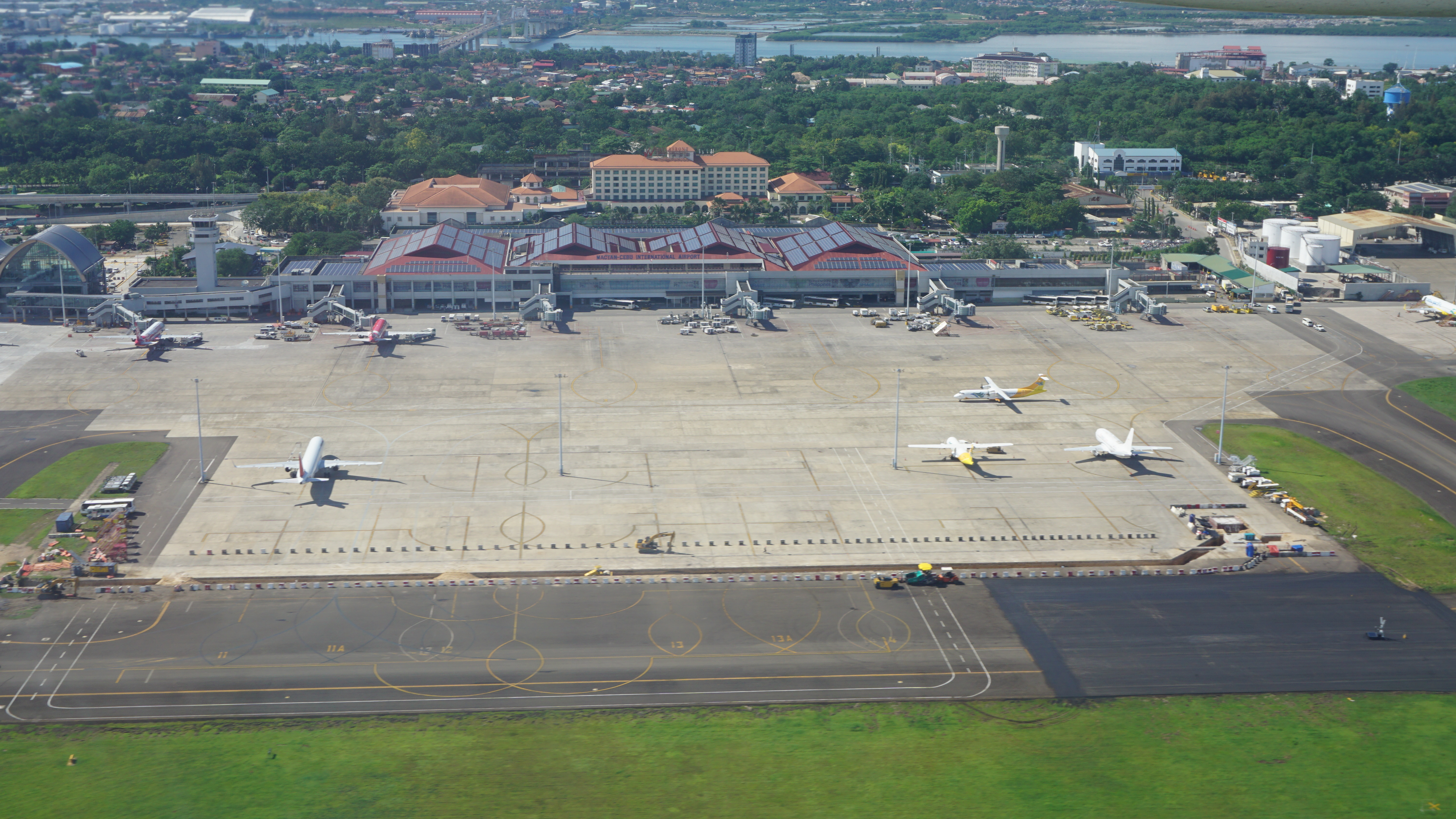
- IATA: CEB; ICAO: RPVM; WMO: 98646

Summary
- Airport type: Public
- Owner: Mactan–Cebu International Airport Authority
- Operator: Aboitiz InfraCapital Inc.
- Serves: Cebu
- Location: Mactan, Lapu-Lapu City, Philippines
- Opened: April 27, 1966; 60 years ago
- Hub for: PAL Express; Philippine Airlines
- Operating base for: Cebgo; Cebu Pacific; Philippines AirAsia; Sunlight Air
- Time zone: PHT (UTC+08:00)
- Elevation AMSL: 9 m (30 ft)
- Coordinates: 10°18′26″N 123°58′44″E
- Website: www.mactancebuairport.com

Maps
- Location within Metro Cebu Location within Visayas Location within Philippines

Runways
Direction	Length		Surface
Direction	m	ft	Surface
04R/22L (Note: Renamed from 04/22 since July 10, 2025.)	3,310	10,860	Asphalt/Concrete
04L/22R	2,560	8,400	Concrete

Statistics (2025)
- Passengers: 11,604,218 ▲2.45%
- Aircraft movements: 100,061 ▲0.92%
- Cargo (in kg): 77,474,326 ▲13.05%
- Source: MCIAA

Mactan–Cebu International Airport (MCIA; IATA: CEB, ICAO: RPVM) is the main international airport serving Cebu and the main gateway to the Central Visayas region of the Philippines. Located on a 797-hectare (1,970-acre) site in Lapu-Lapu City on Mactan island, it is the second busiest airport in the Philippines. Opened on April 27, 1966, the airport serves as a hub for Philippine Airlines and as an operating base for Cebu Pacific, Philippines AirAsia, and Sunlight Air.

The airport is managed by the Mactan–Cebu International Airport Authority and operated by Aboitiz InfraCapital Inc.

MCIA has received numerous awards, including being named the Best Airport in the Asia-Pacific Region in the 5–15 million passengers category at the Airports Council International (ACI) World Airport Service Quality (ASQ) Customer Experience Awards in 2024 and 2025. It was also recognized as Asia's "Airport of the Year" at the 2025 Travel Trade Excellence Awards in Singapore.

== History ==
=== Early years ===
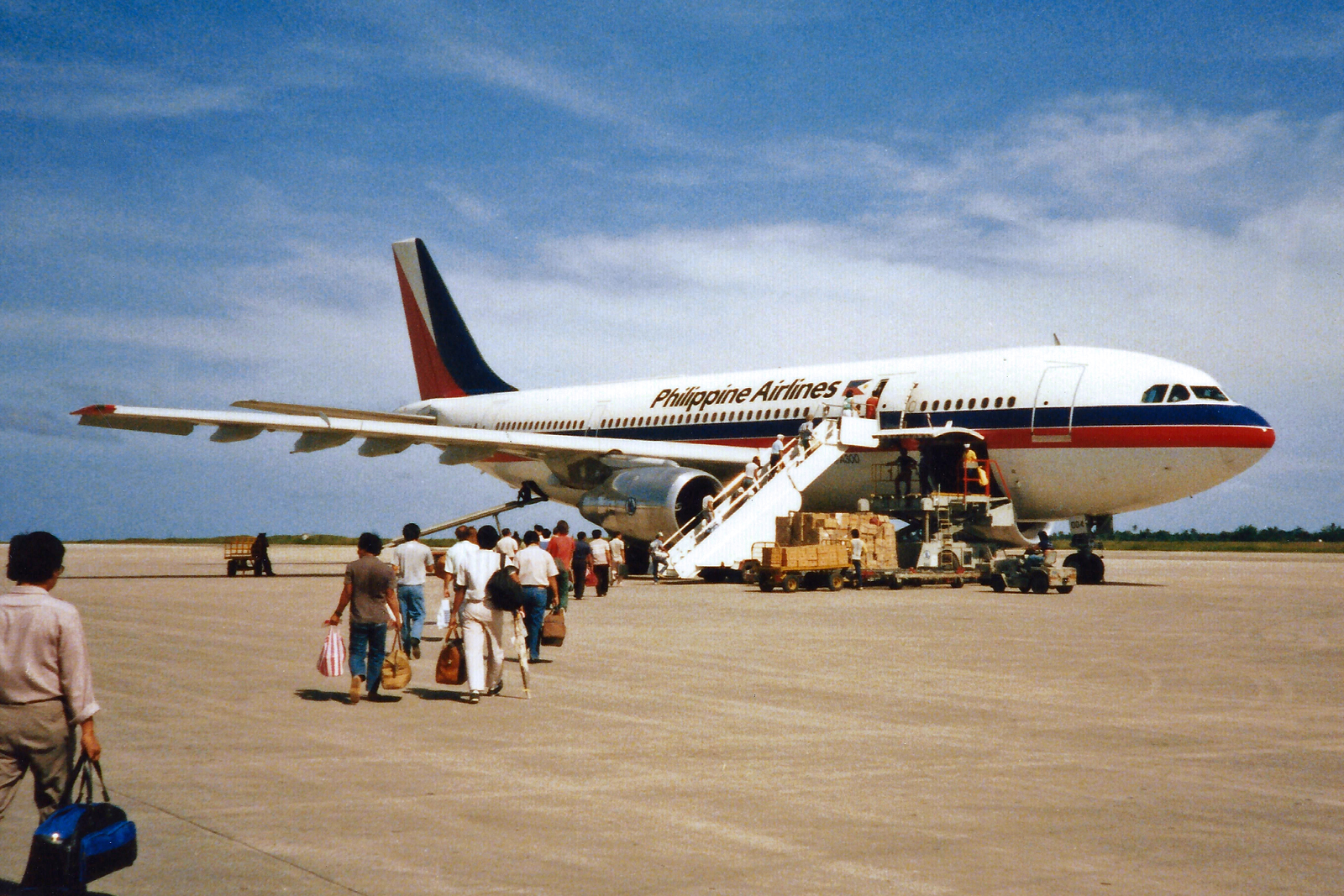
Philippine Airlines Airbus A300B4 on the ramp of Mactan-Cebu International Airport, 1986.

The runway was built by the United States Air Force in 1956 as an emergency airport for Strategic Air Command bombers. It was known back then as the Mactan Air Base. It remained a spartan outpost until the Vietnam War in the 1960s when it became a base for a C-130 unit of the U.S. Air Force.

Commercial operations started on April 27, 1966 for domestic flights. It replaced the now closed Lahug Airport (now the site of Cebu IT Park) which could no longer be expanded due to safety and physical problems. International charter flights later commenced in 1978.

On July 31, 1990, Republic Act No. 6958 was approved, which created and established the Mactan–Cebu International Airport Authority (MCIAA). The law transferred the existing assets and operations of Mactan–Cebu International Airport and Lahug Airport to the newly created MCIAA.

=== Expansion ===
Plans for a new terminal were laid as early as 2005, but the expansion of the existing terminal was instead pursued. By 2009, the airport handled 4.8 million passengers, way beyond the capacity of 4.5 million. By 2017, the airport handled more than ten million passengers.

The expansion of the airport was included on the list of big-ticket public-private partnership (PPP) projects as part of the PPP infrastructure program that was launched in 2010. Bidding was opened in 2012. On April 23, 2014, the Department of Transportation and Communications awarded the operations and maintenance of MCIA to a consortium of the Philippines' Megawide Construction Corporation and Bengaluru-based GMR Infrastructure. The consortium won with a bid of ₱17.5 billion. MCIAA handed over the operations and maintenance of the airport to the private consortium on November 1, 2014.

On June 29, 2015, President Benigno Aquino III led the ground-breaking rites at the site of the old Philippine Air Force base in Lapu-Lapu City which had been demolished to give way for the Terminal 2 construction. Construction of Terminal 2 began on January 22, 2016, under Aquino, with the end goal of increasing the airport’s capacity from 4.5 million to 12.5 million passengers. On June 7, 2018, Terminal 2 was inaugurated by Aquino's successor, President Rodrigo Duterte, who attended the ribbon-cutting with the terminal being operational on July 1.

On May 22, 2017, Mactan–Cebu International Airport Authority (MCIAA) passed a resolution approving the proposal to start the construction of a second runway, which was proposed by Rep. Raul del Mar of Cebu. Del Mar proposed that the construction of the second runway be funded using P4.9- billion sourced from the P14.4 billion premium given by the GMCAC when it won the bid to develop and manage the MCIA terminal. Once completed, the second runway will be adjacent to the existing first runway and will enable simultaneous runway operations. The groundbreaking ceremony of the second runway took place on January 14, 2020. On January 30, 2025, President Bongbong Marcos inaugurated and opened the second runway.

On May 5, 2021, the airport's second taxiway and expanded apron was inaugurated.

=== Contemporary history ===
Following Typhoon Haiyan (Yolanda), one of the biggest typhoons ever recorded and one of the most destructive typhoons in the Philippines, the airport was used as a center for air operations for the relief effort. The airport is centrally located in the Visayas which was the region most affected by the storm, especially the Eastern Visayas islands of Leyte and Samar. The Cebu airport was relatively unaffected by the storm while the airports of the Eastern Visayas were unusable immediately after.

On November 12, 2013, the world's longest and heaviest aircraft, the Antonov An-225 Mriya, landed at MCIA from Zagreb International Airport in Croatia for the first time in the Philippines. It delivered a 180-ton replacement transformer from the Croatian energy company KONČAR for the First Gen Corporation's power plant in Batangas City. Officials of First Gen approached MCIAA General Manager Nigel Paul Villarete to allow the Antonov An-225 to utilize the airport for the transportation of their delivery after officials from Clark International Airport, Ninoy Aquino International Airport in Manila, and Subic Bay International Airport refused to allow the aircraft to utilize their airports. According to First Gen President Francis Giles Puno, MCIA had been inspected by Antonov Airlines, the owner of the Antonov An-225 aircraft, as the most viable option for their aircraft, "after considering the combination of airport, onward land transport and sea freight."

Philippine Airlines offered non-stop flights to Los Angeles, the longest route from MCIA, beginning in March 2016. However, the flights ended in May 2017. This was the Visayan airport's only direct link to North America when it was still operational.

On December 16, 2021, the airport was closed indefinitely after sustaining heavy damage from Typhoon Rai (Odette) before resuming operations on December 19 under a new layout that integrates both terminals together since the domestic terminal sustained the most damage, while the international terminal only suffered minor damage.

On September 2, 2022, Aboitiz purchased a 33.33% stake on GMR–Megawide Cebu Airport Corporation for ₱25 billion. In turn, GMR–Megawide issued ₱15 billion worth of exchangeable bonds in exchange for the remaining shares in GMCAC. On October 30, 2024, it fully acquired GMCAC for ₱7.76 billion, thereby completely taking over the operations of MCIA.

== Structures and facilities ==
=== Terminals ===
Mactan–Cebu International Airport has two passenger terminals, with plans laid in 2019 for another terminal.

Passenger terminal infrastructure
Terminal	Opened	Floor area	Handling capacity	Parking bays
Terminal 1	1990	38,525 m^{2} (414,680 sq ft)	11.7 million passengers per year	6 (aerobridge); 12 (remote)
Terminal 2	July 1, 2018	65,500 m^{2} (705,000 sq ft)	8 million passengers per year	7 (aerobridge); 5 (remote)
Total	—N/a	104,025 m^{2} (1,119,720 sq ft)	19.7 million passengers per year	13 (aerobridge); 17 (remote)

==== Terminal 1 ====
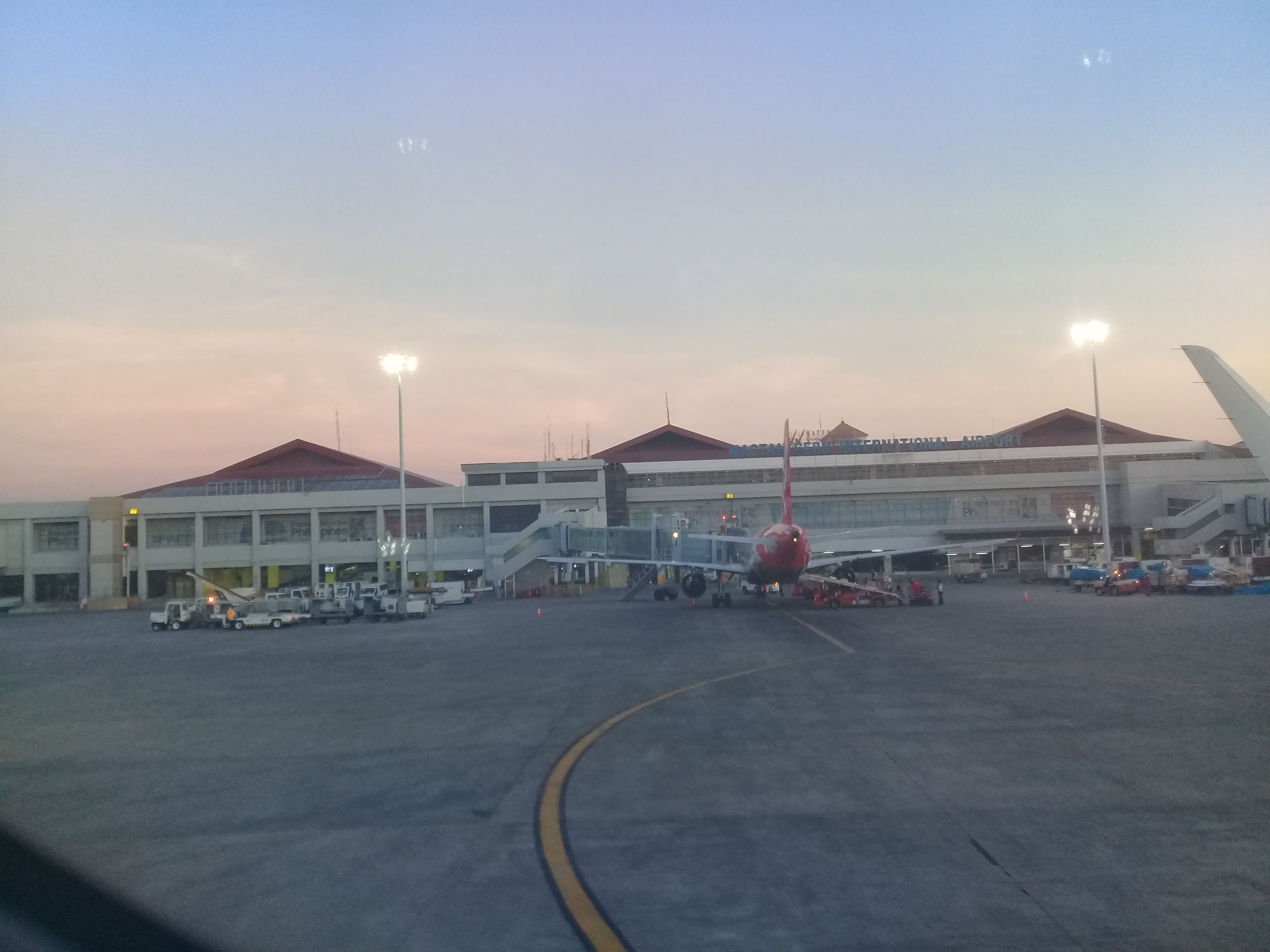
Exterior of Terminal 1 in 2018

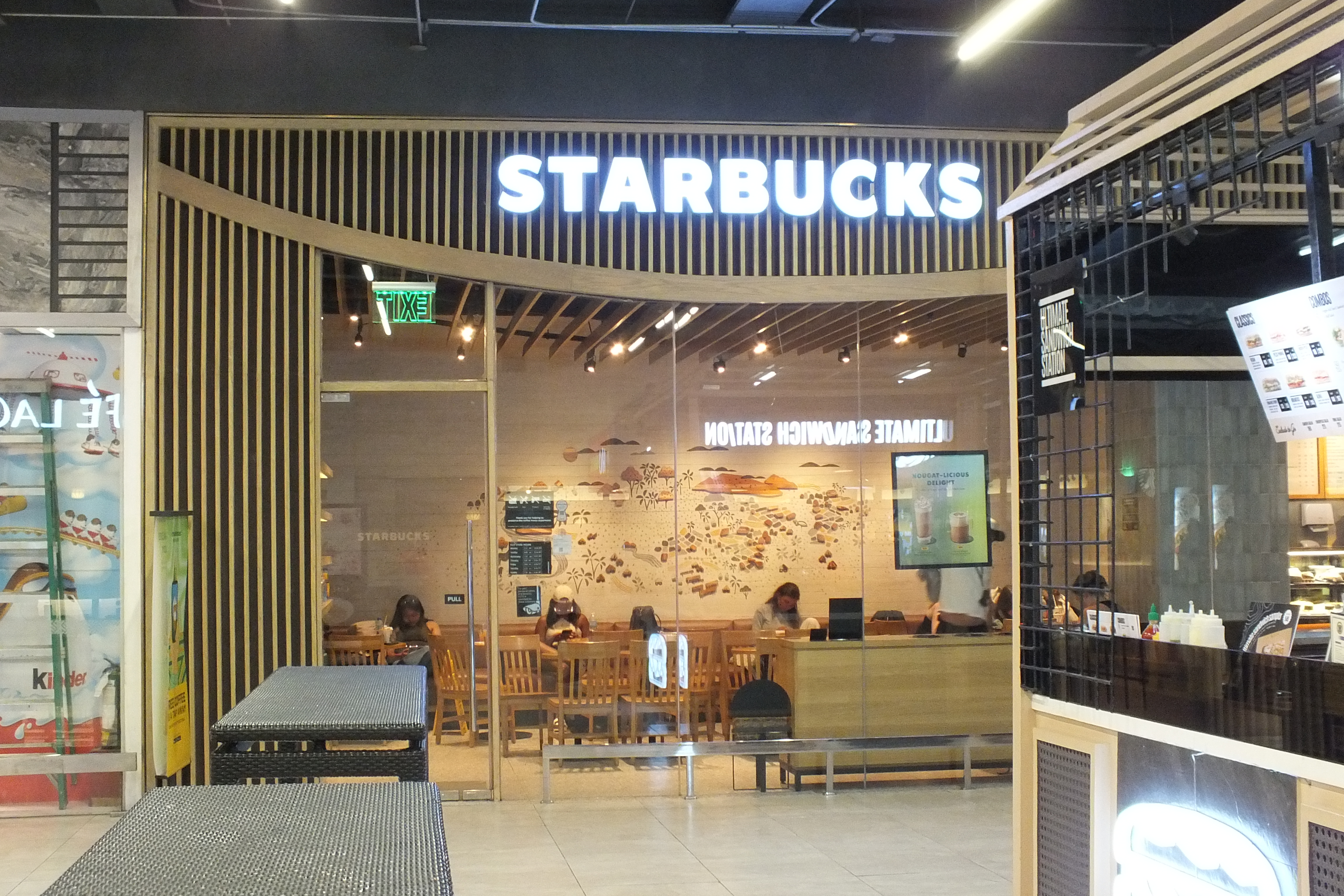
Starbucks at Terminal 1 in 2025

Terminal 1, which was built in 1990, serves as the airport's domestic terminal. Prior to the completion and opening of Terminal 2, it housed both domestic and international operations and prior to its expansion, had an annual capacity of 4.5 million passengers, before being increased to eight million following minor renovations from 2015 to 2016.

The terminal has a floor area of 38,525 square meters (414,680 sq ft). It has six jet bridges and twelve remote parking spaces for aircraft. There are six baggage conveyor belts in the baggage claim area.

GMR–Megawide Cebu Airport Corporation announced a two-phase renovation of Terminal 1 in December 2018 as part of its ₱17 billion investment to improve the terminals. The renovation involved the expansion of the pre-departure area and improved flight information displays. Manila-based architectural firm Budji + Royal Architecture + Design handled the terminal renovation, which was based on a resort-type design. One of its features is the Airport Village, which offers more landside restaurants and stores. Renovations began in March 2019. President Rodrigo Duterte inaugurated the newly rehabilitated Terminal 1 on January 19, 2020, increasing its capacity to 11.7 million passengers.

==== Terminal 2 ====
Interior of Terminal 2 in 2019

Exterior of Terminal 2 in 2022

Terminal 2 viewed from apron

Terminal 2 is the newest airport terminal and has an annual capacity of eight million passengers. The project was proposed, planned, funded, and constructed by the administration of President Noynoy Aquino. Construction began on January 22, 2016, under President Aquino's orders, and was later inaugurated on June 7, 2018, where President Rodrigo Duterte attended the ribbon-cutting ceremony. It opened to passengers on July 1.

Integrated Design Associates designed the terminal with European timber arches from Austria that look like an inverted boat hull, and a wave-like roof that evokes a tropical and resort-like feel. It represents the sea waves that surrounds the island of Cebu. Terminal 2 won an award for the category "Completed Buildings – Transport" at the World Architecture Festival in 2019.

Occupying an area of 65,500 square meters (705,000 sq ft), the terminal has four check-in halls with 48 check-in counters in the departures area expandable to 72, seven jet bridges expandable to 12, 12 escalators, 15 elevators, duty-free shops, and a departure lobby. The terminal's modular design allows for progressive expansion, with a fundamental building block structured for maximum adaptability to future development. Terminal 2 is exclusive only for international flights. However, due to the aftermath of Typhoon Odette, it was used for both domestic and international flights from January 16, 2022, until most parts of Terminal 1 were fully repaired by June.

=== Runways ===
The airport has a 3,310-meter (10,860 ft) main runway (Runway 04R/22L) with a width of 45 meters (148 ft) that was built by the United States in 1956 as an emergency airport for U.S. Air Forces' Strategic Air Command bombers and was known as Mactan Air Base. The runway is complemented by a full-length taxiway that it shares with the current Mactan Air Base of the Philippine Air Force.

The second runway (Runway 04L/22R) started construction in January 2020. It is 2,560 meters (8,400 ft) long and 45 meters (148 ft) wide. It was completed in January 2024, but remained closed. The said runway is planned to be used in case the main runway (04R/22L) is closed. It was inaugurated in January 2025. MCIA's joint runways are the Philippines' only set of parallel runways since Clark International Airport decommissioned its second runway in 2017.

=== Other structures ===
The airport has other government buildings like the two-level CAAP Administration Building and the six-level MCIAA Corporate Building, located within the airport complex. The parking area outside the terminals has a total capacity of 750 cars.

== Airlines and destinations ==
=== Passenger ===
Airlines	Destinations
Aero K	Cheongju
Air Busan	Busan
AirAsia	Kuala Lumpur–International
Cathay Pacific	Hong Kong
Cebgo	Bacolod, Busuanga, Butuan, Calbayog, Camiguin, Dipolog, Dumaguete, El Nido, Legazpi, Masbate, Ozamiz, Pagadian, Siargao, Surigao, Tacloban
Cebu Pacific	Bangkok–Don Mueang, Cagayan de Oro, Caticlan, Clark, Davao, General Santos, Ho Chi Minh City, Hong Kong, Iloilo, Manila, Nagoya–Centrair (begins December 1, 2026), Osaka–Kansai, Puerto Princesa, Seoul–Incheon, Shanghai–Pudong (resumes December 1, 2026), Singapore, Tokyo–Narita, Zamboanga
China Airlines	Taipei–Taoyuan
China Eastern Airlines	Shanghai–Pudong
Emirates	Dubai–International (Note: Emirates flights make an intermediate stop in Clark en route to the listed destination. However, the airline has no cabotage rights to carry passengers solely between Cebu and Clark.)
EVA Air	Taipei–Taoyuan
Firefly	Kuala Lumpur–International
Jeju Air	Busan, Daegu, Seoul–Incheon
Jetstar	Seasonal: Brisbane
Jin Air	Busan, Seoul–Incheon
Korean Air	Seoul–Incheon
PAL Express	Bacolod, Borongan, Busuanga, Butuan, Cagayan de Oro, Catarman, Caticlan, Cotabato, Davao, General Santos, Iloilo, Manila, Puerto Princesa, Siargao, Tacloban, Zamboanga
Philippine Airlines	Manila, Osaka–Kansai, Tokyo–Narita; Seasonal: Guam (resumes December 17, 2026)
Philippines AirAsia	Manila
Qatar Airways	Doha (resumes March 29, 2027) (Note: Qatar Airways flights make an intermediate stop in Davao en route to the listed destination. However, the airline has no cabotage rights to carry passengers solely between Cebu and Davao.)
Scoot	Singapore
Singapore Airlines	Singapore
Starlux Airlines	Taipei–Taoyuan
Sunlight Air	Busuanga, Siargao, Siquijor
United Airlines	Tokyo–Narita
VietJet Air	Hanoi, Ho Chi Minh City; Charter: Da Nang
Vietnam Airlines	Hanoi
XiamenAir	Quanzhou

=== Cargo ===
Airlines	Destinations
Air Hong Kong	Hong Kong, Manila
Central Airlines	Shenzhen, Wuhu
Jiangsu Jingdong Cargo Airlines	Shenzhen
Royal Air Philippines	Davao
SDA Cargo	Xiamen
SEAir International	Clark

== Statistics ==
Data from the Mactan–Cebu International Airport Authority (MCIAA).

Year	Passenger movements				Aircraft movements				Cargo movements (in kg)			
Year	Domestic	International	Total	% change	Domestic	International	Total	% change	Domestic	International	Total	% change
1991	1,401,671	57,988	1,459,659	Steady	22,495	786	23,281	Steady	22,704,044	577,966	23,282,010	Steady
1992	1,592,173	97,842	1,690,015	▲15.78	22,638	919	23,557	▲1.19	24,157,026	1,914,630	26,071,656	▲11.98
1993	1,635,779	172,966	1,808,745	▲7.03	18,401	1,508	19,909	▼15.49	28,782,759	739,662	29,522,421	▲13.24
1994	1,714,104	244,602	1,958,706	▲8.29	18,191	2,109	20,300	▲1.96	35,487,442	1,106,365	36,593,807	▲23.95
1995	1,841,904	307,203	2,149,107	▲9.72%	18,854	2,565	21,419	▲5.51	34,094,876	6,837,271	40,932,147	▲11.86
1996	2,047,966	354,818	2,402,784	▲11.80	21,136	3,079	24,215	▲13.05	38,506,657	10,862,813	49,369,470	▲20.61
1997	2,331,431	387,190	2,718,621	▲13.14	23,537	3,398	26,935	▲11.23	40,635,709	12,082,148	52,717,857	▲6.78
1998	1,759,141	312,663	2,071,804	▼23.79	18,281	3,022	21,303	▼20.91	28,087,092	18,598,134	46,685,226	▼11.44
1999	1,912,107	384,047	2,296,154	▲10.83	21,936	3,986	25,922	▲21.68	26,458,875	19,189,755	45,648,630	▼2.22
2000	1,889,114	403,735	2,292,849	▼0.14	20,691	3,509	24,200	▼6.64	34,271,494	22,326,355	56,597,849	▲23.99
2001	1,855,363	397,370	2,252,733	▼1.75	24,304	4,140	28,444	▲17.54	32,985,484	19,712,628	52,698,112	▼6.89
2002	1,709,259	425,957	2,135,216	▼5.22	24,366	3,601	27,967	▼1.68	26,603,917	19,840,629	46,444,546	▼11.87
2003	1,850,453	422,329	2,272,782	▲6.44	24,488	3,886	28,374	▲1.46	30,048,371	19,428,129	49,476,500	▲6.53
2004	2,033,556	578,206	2,611,762	▲14.91	23,837	4,261	28,098	▼0.97	37,985,572	19,678,009	57,663,581	▲16.55
2005	2,106,380	672,284	2,778,664	▲6.39	22,444	4,653	27,097	▼3.56	34,851,582	17,343,810	52,195,392	▼9.48
2006	2,291,952	778,210	3,070,162	▲10.49	22,128	5,621	27,749	▲2.41	31,851,644	18,773,805	50,625,449	▼3.01
2007	2,765,523	965,977	3,731,500	▲21.54	24,004	7,373	31,377	▲13.07	34,274,471	19,198,453	53,472,924	▲5.62
2008	2,997,161	994,089	3,991,250	▲6.96	27,205	7,619	34,824	▲10.99	31,504,729	17,435,687	48,940,416	▼8.48
2009	3,841,990	920,913	4,762,903	▲19.33	37,328	7,011	44,339	▲27.32	31,248,525	14,610,526	45,859,051	▼6.30
2010	4,206,651	1,206,801	5,413,452	▲13.66	39,470	7,907	47,377	▲6.85	36,191,069	18,686,898	54,877,967	▲19.67
2011	4,748,333	1,467,613	6,215,946	▲14.82	44,300	9,509	53,809	▲13.58	36,511,394	15,271,651	51,783,045	▼5.64
2012	5,257,941	1,513,377	6,771,318	▲8.93	49,242	9,646	58,888	▲9.44	43,415,209	13,558,398	56,973,607	▲10.02
2013	5,369,929	1,626,183	6,996,112	▲3.32	53,954	10,991	64,945	▲10.29	46,548,042	15,186,420	61,734,462	▲8.36
2014	5,160,109	1,679,740	6,839,849	▼2.23	44,651	11,630	56,281	▼13.34	39,081,696	15,048,599	54,130,295	▼12.32
2015	5,769,104	2,012,135	7,781,239	▲13.76	48,850	13,363	62,213	▲10.54	65,378,724	19,353,499	84,732,223	▲56.53
2016	6,334,283	2,436,355	8,770,638	▲12.72	55,804	15,739	71,543	▲15.00	49,976,828	16,947,007	66,923,835	▼21.02
2017	6,904,978	3,145,962	10,050,940	▲14.60	65,310	21,070	86,380	▲20.74	55,340,945	17,974,165	73,315,110	▲9.55
2018	7,611,398	3,788,489	11,377,887	▲13.20	75,010	25,439	100,449	▲16.29	62,817,080	19,240,760	82,057,840	▲11.92
2019	8,370,466	4,291,589	12,662,055	▲11.29	79,282	28,512	107,794	▲7.31	58,664,442	17,906,524	76,570,966	▼6.69
2020	1,939,845	806,331	2,746,176	▼78.31	22,707	6,780	29,487	▼72.65	29,446,858	14,392,812	43,839,670	▼42.75
2021	1,163,960	167,571	1,331,531	▼51.51	14,900	2,897	17,797	▼39.64	30,424,637	24,632,353	55,056,990	▲25.59
2022	4,870,471	689,787	5,560,258	▲317.58	48,470	6,527	54,997	▲209.02	32,098,134	24,497,907	56,596,041	▲2.80
2023	7,537,756	2,512,584	10,050,340	▲80.75	72,757	16,955	89,712	▲63.12	39,694,942	18,316,527	58,011,469	▲2.50
2024	8,515,849	2,811,221	11,327,070	▲12.70	81,326	17,823	99,149	▲10.52	44,865,308	23,665,153	68,530,461	▲18.13
2025	8,643,025	2,961,193	11,604,218	▲2.45	79,967	20,094	100,061	▲0.92	47,497,638	29,976,688	77,474,326	▲13.05

== Accidents and incidents ==
- On October 23, 2022, Korean Air Flight 631, an Airbus A330-300 with registration HL7525 originating from Seoul–Incheon, overshot the runway after two landing attempts, shortly after landing in stormy weather. No fatalities were reported, but 20 people received minor injuries and the airplane was damaged beyond repair.
