= Siquijor Airport =

Airport in Siquijor, Philippines

Siquijor Airport Tugpahanan sa Siquijor Paliparan ng Siquijor Hulugpaan sang Siquijor
- IATA: IQR; ICAO: RPVZ

Summary
- Airport type: Public
- Operator: Civil Aviation Authority of the Philippines
- Serves: Siquijor Island
- Location: Cang-alwang, Siquijor
- Elevation AMSL: 27 m (89 ft)
- Coordinates: 9°12′51″N 123°28′20″E

Map
- Map showing location of Siquijor Airport ✈ IQR/RPVZ (Visayas, Philippines)

Runways
Direction	Length		Surface
Direction	m	ft	Surface
04/22	1,250	4,100	Cement

Siquijor Airport (Note: Cebuano: Tugpahanan sa Siquijor, Filipino: Paliparan ng Siquijor, Hiligaynon: Hulugpaan sang Siquijor) (IATA: IQR, ICAO: RPVZ) is a community feeder aerodrome serving the general area of the town of Siquijor, located in the province of Siquijor in the Philippines.

The airport is classified as a community airport by the Civil Aviation Authority of the Philippines.

== Airport facelift and expansion ==
On March 1, 2018, upgrade works in the airport begun. The airport upgrade project covers the construction of a new passenger terminal building, a power station, and a vehicle parking area. Construction was finished on July 30, 2021, and was later inaugurated on August 26. Other upgrade works in the airport includes the runway extension and asphalt overlay, scheduled to be completed in June 2022.

== Terminal and structures ==
=== Terminal building ===
Prior to the airport upgrade, the old passenger terminal building can only accommodate 10 passengers. The new terminal building now handles 50-60 passengers, with plans to expand it up to 100.

=== Runway ===
Prior to the airport upgrade, the airport has a 1,200-meter (3,900 ft) gravel runway that runs in a 04/22 direction.

== Airlines and destinations ==
=== Passenger ===
Airlines	Destinations
Sunlight Air	Cebu

== See also ==
- List of airports in the Philippines
