= Boutique airline =

Airline type

A boutique airline is an airline that differentiates from the competition through unique customer experience and personalization.

== Description ==
In the same way as boutique hotels, boutique airlines are equally appropriate for business and vacation travel. It is a category of its own, with a focus on lifestyle branding, and thus positions airline outside the traditional segmentation of four- and five-star airlines.

For traveling, the definition of boutique comes from the term boutique hotels, which refers to intimate and stylish establishments providing luxurious experiences. Generally, boutique also refers to themed lifestyle or design hotels as a contrast to large hotel brands that focus on comfort and convenience in standardized packages.

== Examples ==
Skift lists Singapore Airlines, Fiji Airways, Malaysia Airlines, Korean Air, Emirates, Finnair, Etihad Airways, TAP Air Portugal, Saudia, Qatar Airways, Virgin Australia, All Nippon Airways, Lufthansa, Cathay Pacific, Thai Airways International, Gulf Air, and Scandinavian Airlines as boutique airlines. La Compagnie, BermudAir, Bangkok Airways, AirSWIFT and Sunlight Air describe themselves as boutique airlines.
