= Sayak Airport =

Airport in Siargao Island, Philippines

Sayak Airport Tugpahanan nan Sayak Paliparan ng Sayak
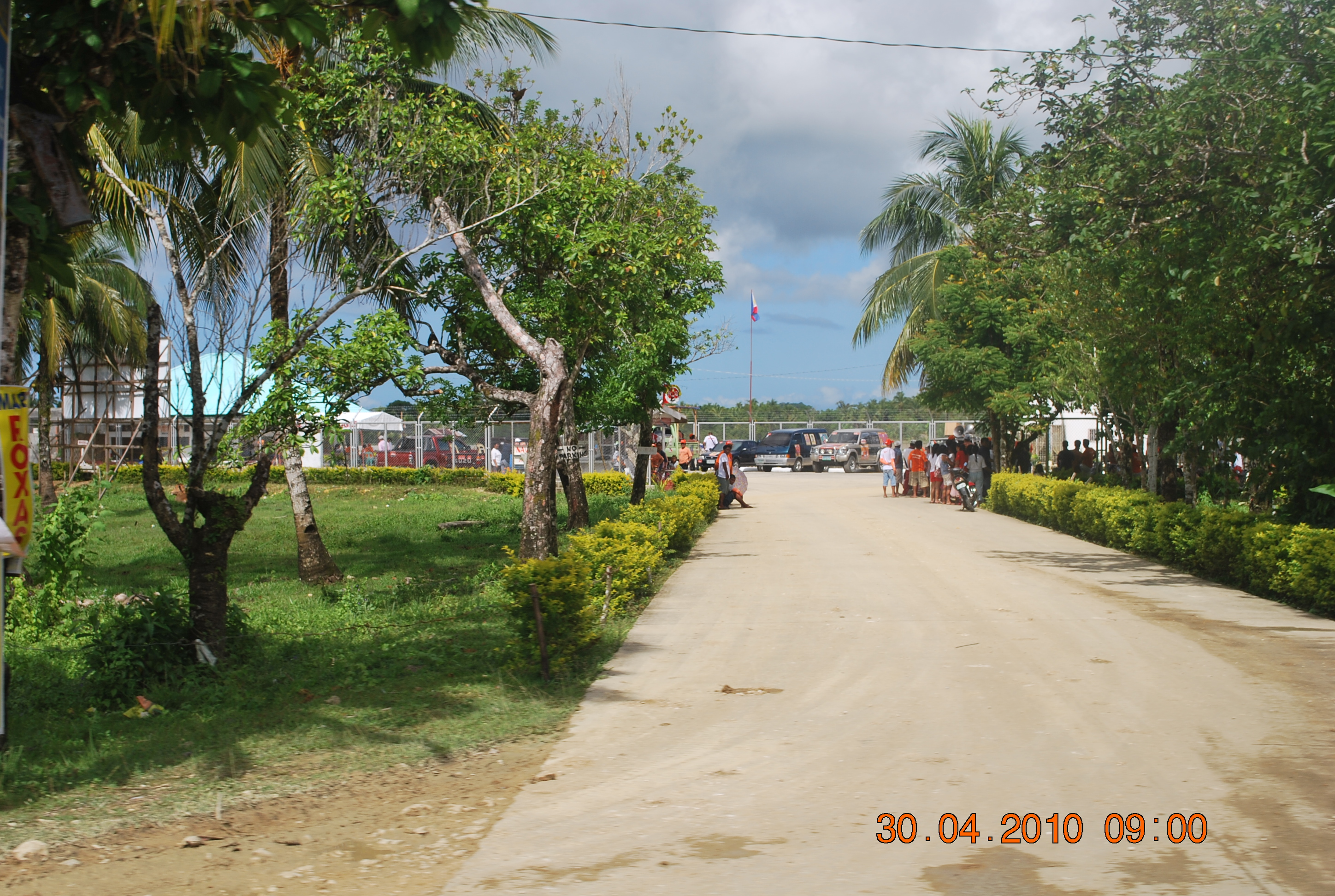
- IATA: IAO; ICAO: RPNS

Summary
- Airport type: Public
- Owner/Operator: Civil Aviation Authority of the Philippines
- Serves: Siargao
- Location: Del Carmen, Surigao del Norte, Philippines
- Opened: 1963; 63 years ago
- Elevation AMSL: 3 m (9.8 ft)
- Coordinates: 9°51′32″N 126°0′50″E

Map
- Location within Mindanao Location within Philippines

Runways
Direction	Length		Surface
Direction	m	ft	Surface
01/19	1,347	4,419	Concrete

Statistics (2024 January to October)
- Passengers: 538,987
- Aircraft movements (2016): 1445

Sayak Airport (IATA: IAO, ICAO: RPNS), commonly known as Siargao Airport, is the main airport serving Siargao Island, Philippines. Located in the municipality of Del Carmen, Surigao del Norte, the airport is designated as a Class 2 principal (minor domestic) airport by the Civil Aviation Authority of the Philippines (CAAP).

== History ==
Siargao Airport was built in 1963 by President Diosdado Macapagal. In 2008, President Gloria Macapagal Arroyo initiated the Super Regions Program to improve economic activity through infrastructure projects. The original airport could accommodate 19-seater planes from Cebu. The airport was renovated and upgraded with the current 1,347 m (4,419 ft) runway which accommodates larger aircraft carrying more than 70 passengers. Under President Noynoy Aquino in 2013, the airport was modernized and expanded, becoming the first modern development in Siargao. The annual Cloud 9 Surfing Cup and international media coverage made Siargao a global name. Visitor arrivals surged, but the airport, designed for fewer than 200 passengers, was quickly overwhelmed. Congestion, long queues, and inadequate facilities became the norm.

The breaking point came in March 2025, when then Transportation Secretary Vince Dizon personally inspected the airport. He was visibly frustrated by the overcrowding, describing the terminal as cramped, humid and hot. At that time, Siargao was handling seventeen flights daily, far beyond its intended capacity. Dizon ordered immediate changes, including the removal of the VIP lounge, the elimination of redundant security checks, and the modular expansion of the terminal to triple its seating capacity. He also directed the Civil Aviation Authority to accelerate plans for a runway extension and a world-class terminal, framing Siargao as a future international gateway.

On August 8, 2025, a landmark moment arrived with the groundbreaking of a new passenger terminal building. Backed by the Department of Transportation and the Department of Tourism, the project promised to increase pre-departure seating capacity from 200 to 750 passengers, with six new check-in counters and modernized facilities. Dizon emphasized that the modular design would allow completion in just eight months, in time for the Philippines' hosting of the ASEAN Summit in 2026. He also acknowledged the issue of high airfares to Siargao, pledging to work with airlines to lower ticket prices, while noting that only a runway extension allowing jet aircraft would significantly reduce costs.

On August 18, 2025, the Department of Transportation summoned airlines after reports that roundtrip fares to Siargao had reached as high as ₱30,000. Dizon remarked that "at times, it is cheaper to go to Japan than to Siargao," underscoring the absurdity of domestic fares surpassing international routes. He called on airlines to explain the pricing and pressed the Civil Aeronautics Board and Civil Aviation Authority to explore ways to lower costs, especially with the holiday season approaching. The episode reflected a broader tension: while infrastructure expansion was underway, affordability and accessibility remained unresolved challenges.

Parallel to these developments, the Department of Transportation was reviewing an unsolicited public-private partnership (PPP) proposal from the Gokongwei-led JG Summit Holdings and the Gotianun-led Filinvest Development Corporation. The proposal bundled the modernization of several regional airports, including Siargao, Davao, and Bohol. While the PPP focused on operations and maintenance, Dizon clarified that runway expansion would remain a government responsibility, given its high cost and environmental implications. This bundling strategy reflected a broader infrastructure policy of leveraging private sector efficiency while retaining state control over capital-intensive expansions.

== Airlines and destinations ==
Airlines	Destinations
Cebgo	Cebu, Clark, Davao
PAL Express	Cebu
Sunlight Air	Cebu, Clark

== See also ==
- List of airports in the Philippines
