= Francisco B. Reyes Airport =

Airport serving Busuanga Island, Palawan, Philippines

Francisco B. Reyes Airport Paliparan ng Francisco B. Reyes
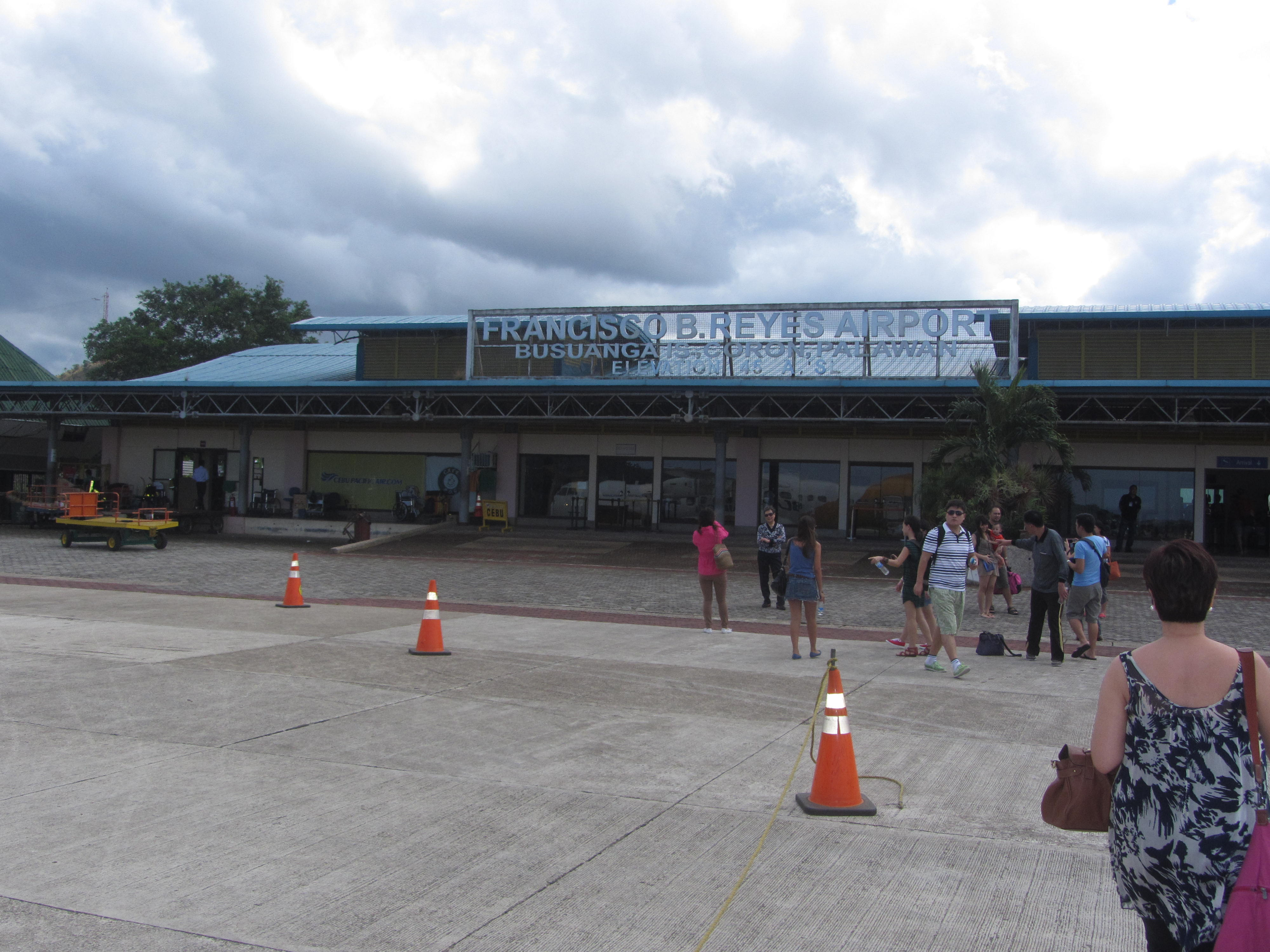
- IATA: USU; ICAO: RPVV

Summary
- Airport type: Public
- Owner/Operator: Civil Aviation Authority of the Philippines
- Serves: Busuanga
- Location: Coron
- Elevation AMSL: 45 m (148 ft)
- Coordinates: 12°07′17″N 120°06′00″E

Map
- Location within Palawan Location within Philippines

Runways
Direction	Length		Surface
Direction	m	ft	Surface
08/26	1,225	4,019	Concrete

Statistics (2021)
- Passengers: 42,255
- Aircraft movements: 2,262
- Cargo (in kgs): 1,770,993
- Source: CAAP

Francisco B. Reyes Airport (IATA: USU, ICAO: RPVV), more commonly known as Busuanga Airport, is an airport serving the general area of Coron, located in Busuanga Island in the province of Palawan, Philippines. It is also shared with the neighboring municipality of Busuanga, located on the western half of the island. The airport is named after Francisco B. Reyes, the Mayor of Coron from 1936 to 1939, who donated the land upon which the current airport complex stands.

The airport is classified as a Class 2 principal (minor domestic) airport by the Civil Aviation Authority of the Philippines, a body of the Department of Transportation that is responsible for the operations all airports in the Philippines except the major international airports.

== History and expansion ==
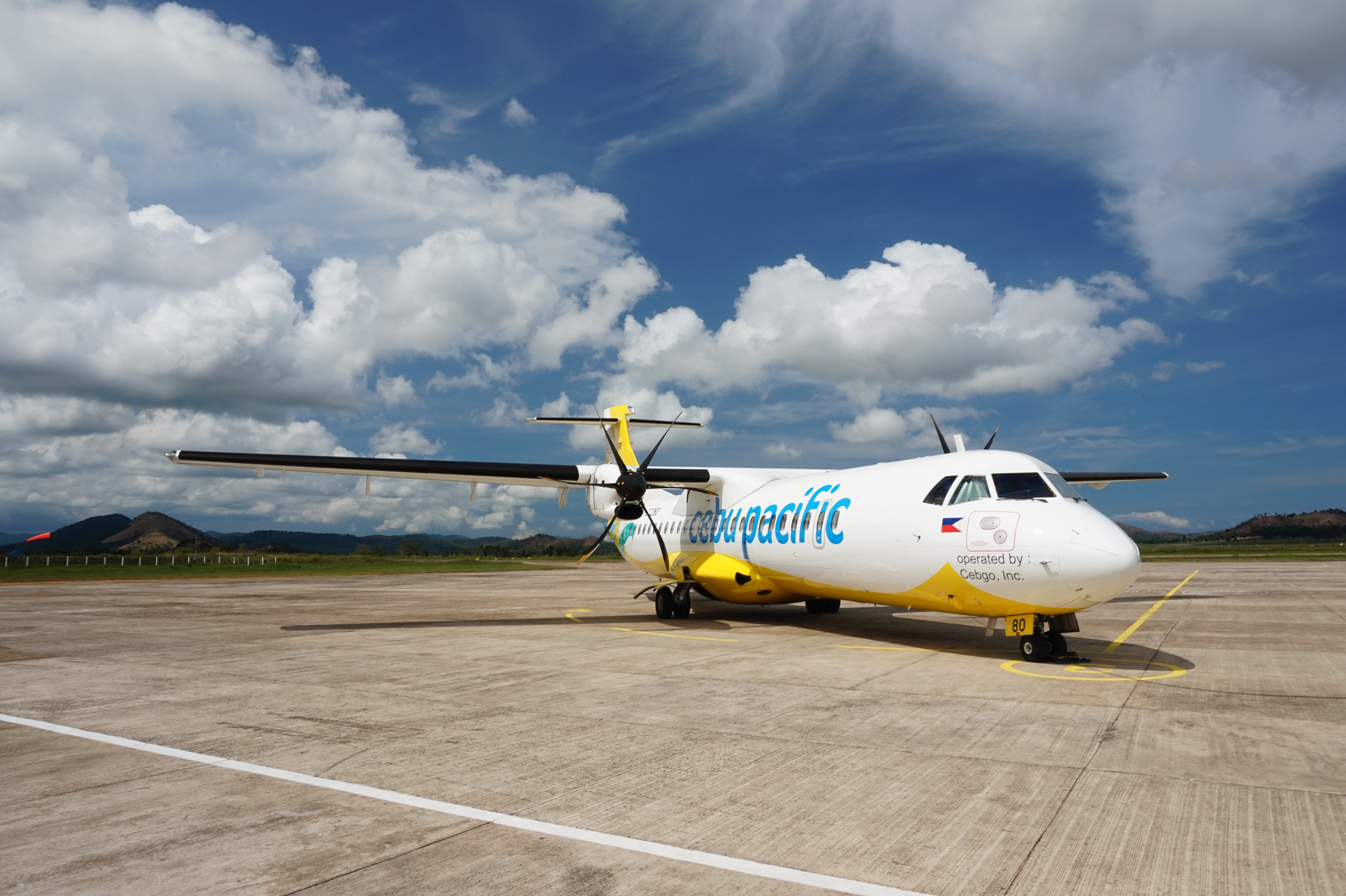
Cebu Pacific ATR 72-600 (RP-C7280) at Busuanga Airport

Francisco B. Reyes Airport is the target of two expansion projects. The first expansion, funded in part by a US$3 million loan from the Korea International Cooperation Agency (KOICA) in cooperation with the Department of Transportation and Communications, broke ground in March 2007. The expansion, which included the construction of a new terminal building, the completion of the airport's then-unfinished concrete runway and the upgrading of other facilities, was inaugurated by President Gloria Macapagal Arroyo on November 17, 2008.

The airport terminal was severely damaged by Typhoon Yolanda (Haiyan) in November 2013. Rehabilitation work was commenced by the municipality of Coron immediately after the typhoon to enable the airport to continue receiving passengers, and was completed by October 2014. Traffic to and from Coron was negatively affected by the airport's closure, with tourist arrivals falling by up to 75%.

A ₱4.1 billion second expansion is also planned for the airport, funded entirely by the national government, with the aim of making it capable of supporting both large jet aircraft and nighttime operations.

== Airlines and destinations ==
Airlines	Destinations
Cebgo	Cebu, Clark, El Nido
PAL Express	Cebu, Clark
Sunlight Air	Cebu, Clark

== Accidents and incidents ==
- On July 14, 2024, a Philippine Airlines De Havilland Dash 8-400 NG operating as PR2670 originating from Mactan Airport overshot the runway during landing, disrupting four flights. None of the 57 people on board sustained injuries.
- On April 2, 2026, a Volpar BE18 cargo aircraft crashed outside the airport's perimeter just after takeoff, bound for Sangley Point Airport, killing its two pilots.

== See also ==
- List of airports in the Philippines
