= Camiguin Airport =

Airport in Camiguin, Philippines

Camiguin Airport Tugpahanan sa Camiguin Paliparan ng Camiguin
- IATA: CGM; ICAO: RPMH

Summary
- Airport type: Public
- Owner/Operator: Civil Aviation Authority of the Philippines
- Serves: Camiguin
- Location: Mambajao
- Elevation AMSL: 16 m / 53 ft
- Coordinates: 09°15′13″N 124°42′25″E

Map

Runways
Direction	Length		Surface
Direction	m	ft	Surface
07/25	1,177	3,862	Asphalt

Statistics (2021)
- Passengers: 1,934
- Aircraft movements: 216
- Tonnes of cargo: 111
- Civil Aviation Authority of the Philippines Aerodrome Management and Development Service, Aircraft Movements, Cargo Movements, and Passenger Movements (2021)

Camiguin Airport (IATA: CGM, ICAO: RPMH) is an airport serving the general area of Mambajao, located in the province of Camiguin in the Philippines. It is the only airport in the province of Camiguin.

The airport is classified as a Class 2 principal (minor domestic) airport by the Civil Aviation Authority of the Philippines, a body of the Department of Transportation that is responsible for the operations of not only this airport but also of all other airports in the Philippines except the major international airports.

== History ==
On November 12, 2001, cleaning operations were made on the airport to make relief supplies land after Typhoon Lingling. Major expansions were made to the airport on October 25, 2021, which created rehabilitation buildings, and the addition of an asphalt overlay for the runway of the airport. It was improved to re-open the airport after the closure during the COVID-19 pandemic. A new runway was planned and started on September 15, 2024. The amount cost P675 million. In March 2025, a project to inspect key airports in Mindanao included the Camiguin Airport.

== Airlines and destinations ==
Airlines	Destinations
Cebgo	Cebu

== Terminal and facilities ==
The airport has a 1,400-square-meter (15,000 sq ft) passenger terminal capable of handling 200 passengers at a time, or 300,000 passengers annually. The terminal used to be able to hold 66. There is a fire station building, an administration building, and a CAAP Security and Intelligence Service building.
