= San Vicente Airport =

Airport serving San Vicente, Palawan, Philippines

San Vicente Airport Paliparan ng San Vicente
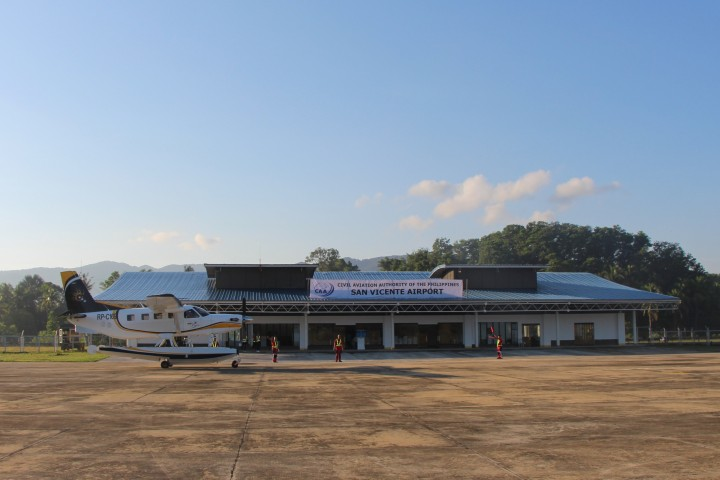
- Exterior of San Vicente Airport
- IATA: SWL; ICAO: RPSV

Summary
- Airport type: Public
- Owner/Operator: Civil Aviation Authority of the Philippines
- Serves: San Vicente
- Opened: June 22, 2017; 9 years ago
- Coordinates: 10°31′30″N 119°16′26″E
- Interactive map of San Vicente Airport

Runways
Direction	Length		Surface
Direction	m	ft	Surface
04/22	1,803	5,915	Concrete

San Vicente Airport (IATA: SWL, ICAO: RPSV) is an airport in San Vicente, Palawan, Philippines. The airport was opened for general aviation flights on 22 June 2017, and opened for commercial flights by the end of 2017. The airport was built to boost tourism in the town and as an alternative to much smaller El Nido Airport.

Travel to this part of northwest Palawan usually takes three hours by land from the provincial capital, Puerto Princesa, located 186 kilometers away. With the airport in operation, travel between Puerto Princesa and San Vicente has been reduced to less than 30 minutes.

== History ==
President Gloria Macapagal Arroyo announced in 2006 that an airport would be built in San Vicente, Palawan to "jump-start tourism development" in the town.

Airport construction began in 2009. A ₱ 62.7-million airport development project was initiated in 2012; this project was to include the construction of a passenger terminal, a fire station building and an elevated 2,500-gallon water tank; and runway extension with slope protection and hill obstruction removal. and was supposed to be completed by March 2014 but delayed by an issue with a nearby private property owner. By February 2017, the airport is already accommodating chartered and private flights.

The removal of a hill obstructing the west end of the runway was completed by March 2017 using funds from the Department of Tourism's Tourism Infrastructure and Enterprise Zone Authority amounting to ₱ 236 million. The completion of San Vicente Airport was followed by potential investors looking to develop the designated "San Vicente Tourism Economic Zone". The local government at that time already had plans to develop its 14.7 kilometers (9.1 mi) white beach along Imuruan Bay as the "next Boracay".

The airport was officially opened for general aviation flights at 8:00 am PST on 22 June 2017. On 1 August 2017, while the airport was still in its final stages of construction, Air Juan operated a charter flight carrying passengers from Puerto Princesa International Airport. It was inaugurated on May 10, 2018, by officials from the Department of Transportation, Civil Aviation Authority of the Philippines, and the provincial government of Palawan.

On October 28, 2018, San Vicente welcomed its first scheduled flight from Clark International Airport. The flight was operated by PAL Express using the De Havilland Canada Dash 8-400 aircraft.

== Facilities ==
The airport features a passenger terminal, a fire station building and an elevated 2,500-US-gallon (9,500 L) water tank facility. Its concrete runway measures 1,803 meters (5,915 ft) long and 45 meters (148 ft) wide. The terminal can accommodate 100 people.

Although the current runway can handle aircraft as large as the Airbus A220, the airport can safely accommodate aircraft like ATR 42, ATR 72, De Havilland Canada Dash 8-400 and the British Aerospace 146. A future runway extension of 300 meters (980 ft) will enable the airport to handle larger aircraft as large as the Airbus A320.

The airport's control tower, parking area, runway expansion and drainage system has been completed as of January 2023.

The Runway orientation is 04/22.
