= Godofredo P. Ramos Airport =

Airport serving Boracay Island, Philippines

Godofredo P. Ramos Airport Paeoparan it Godofredo P. Ramos Hulugpaan sang Godofredo P. Ramos Paliparan ng Godofredo P. Ramos

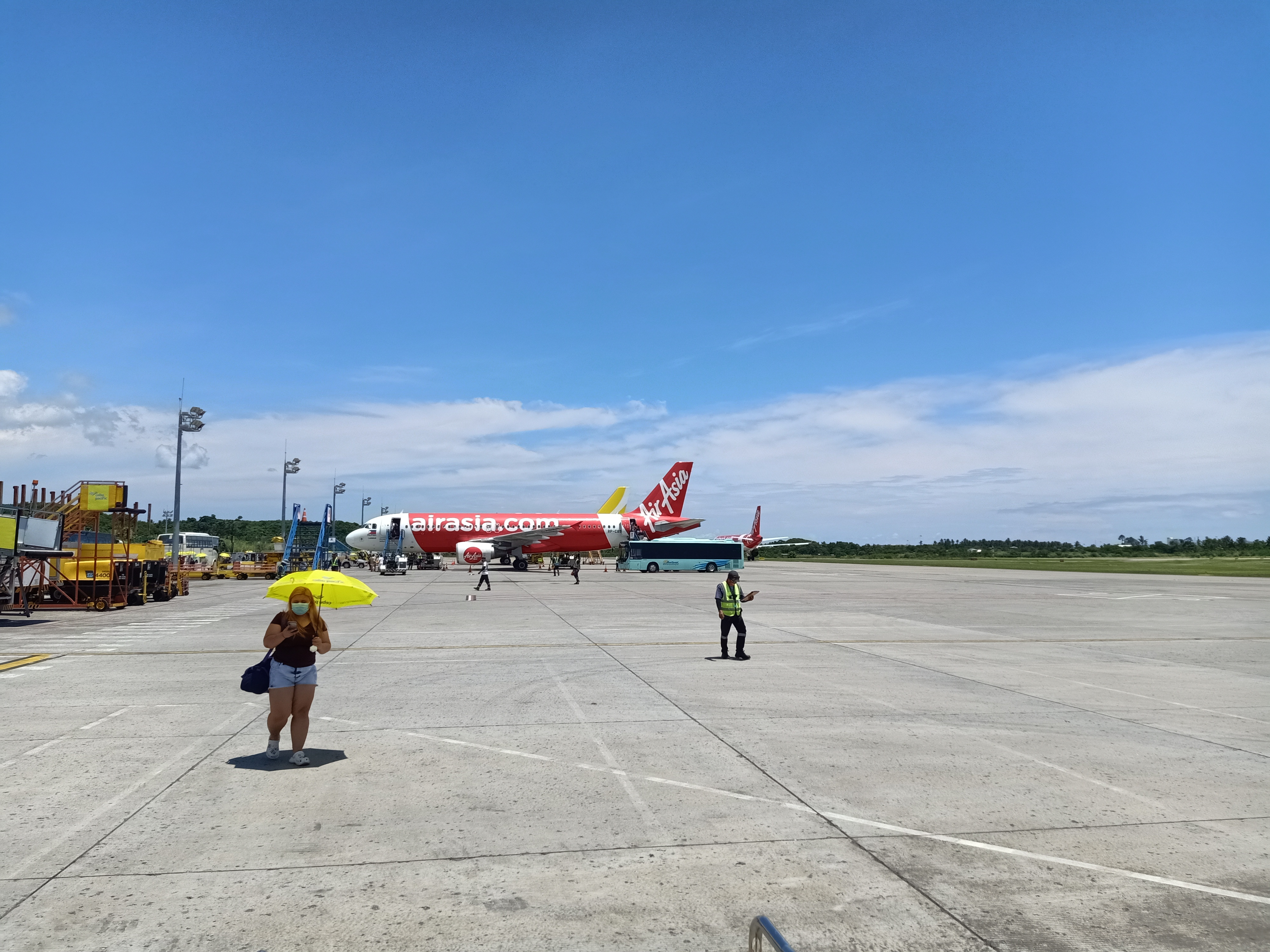
- The airport apron in June 2022
- IATA: MPH; ICAO: RPVE

Summary
- Airport type: Public
- Owner: Civil Aviation Authority of the Philippines
- Operator: Trans Aire Development Holdings Corporation
- Serves: Boracay
- Location: Malay and Nabas, Aklan, Philippines
- Opened: 1935; 91 years ago
- Elevation AMSL: 5 m (16 ft)
- Coordinates: 11°55′29″N 121°57′18″E

Map
- Location within Visayas Location within Philippines

Runways
Direction	Length		Surface
Direction	m	ft	Surface
06/24 (Note: Runway 06 is 1,700 meters (5,600 ft) long with a displaced threshold of 100 meters (330 ft) and 24 is 1,750 meters (5,740 ft) long with a displaced threshold of 50 meters (160 ft).)	1,800	5,906	Concrete

Statistics (2023)
- Passengers: 3,288,166 ▲42.46%
- Aircraft movements: 24,784 ▲33.97%
- Cargo (in kg): 15,799,599 ▲43.15%
- Source: CAAP

Godofredo P. Ramos Airport (IATA: MPH, ICAO: RPVE), also known as Caticlan Airport and Boracay Airport, is an international airport serving the general area of the municipality of Malay, located in the province of Aklan in the Philippines. It is one of the two gateways to Boracay, the other being Kalibo International Airport in Kalibo.

The airport is the fourth-busiest airport in the Philippines and the busiest in the Western Visayas region, serving 3.2 million passengers in 2023.

Since November 7, 2012, the airport has been named after the late Godofredo P. Ramos, a former congressman who is known as the "Father of Aklan" as he authored a house bill proposing the separation of Aklan from the province of Capiz that was later approved in 1956. However, the name Caticlan Airport derives from its location in the barangay of Caticlan in the municipality of Malay.

== History ==
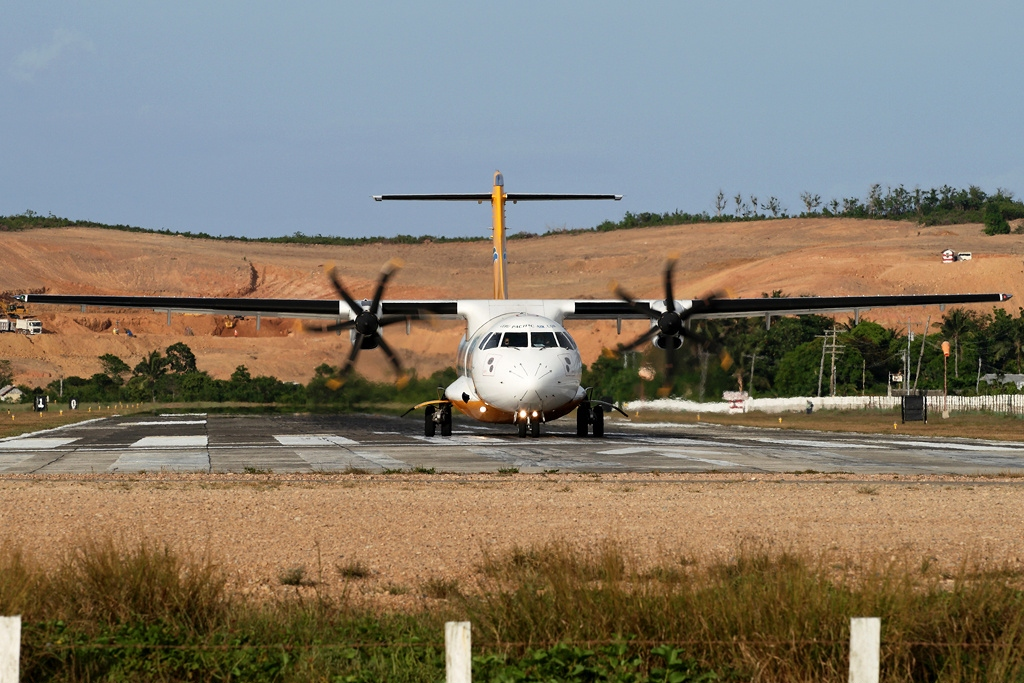
The airport runway in 2013 prior to its expansion.

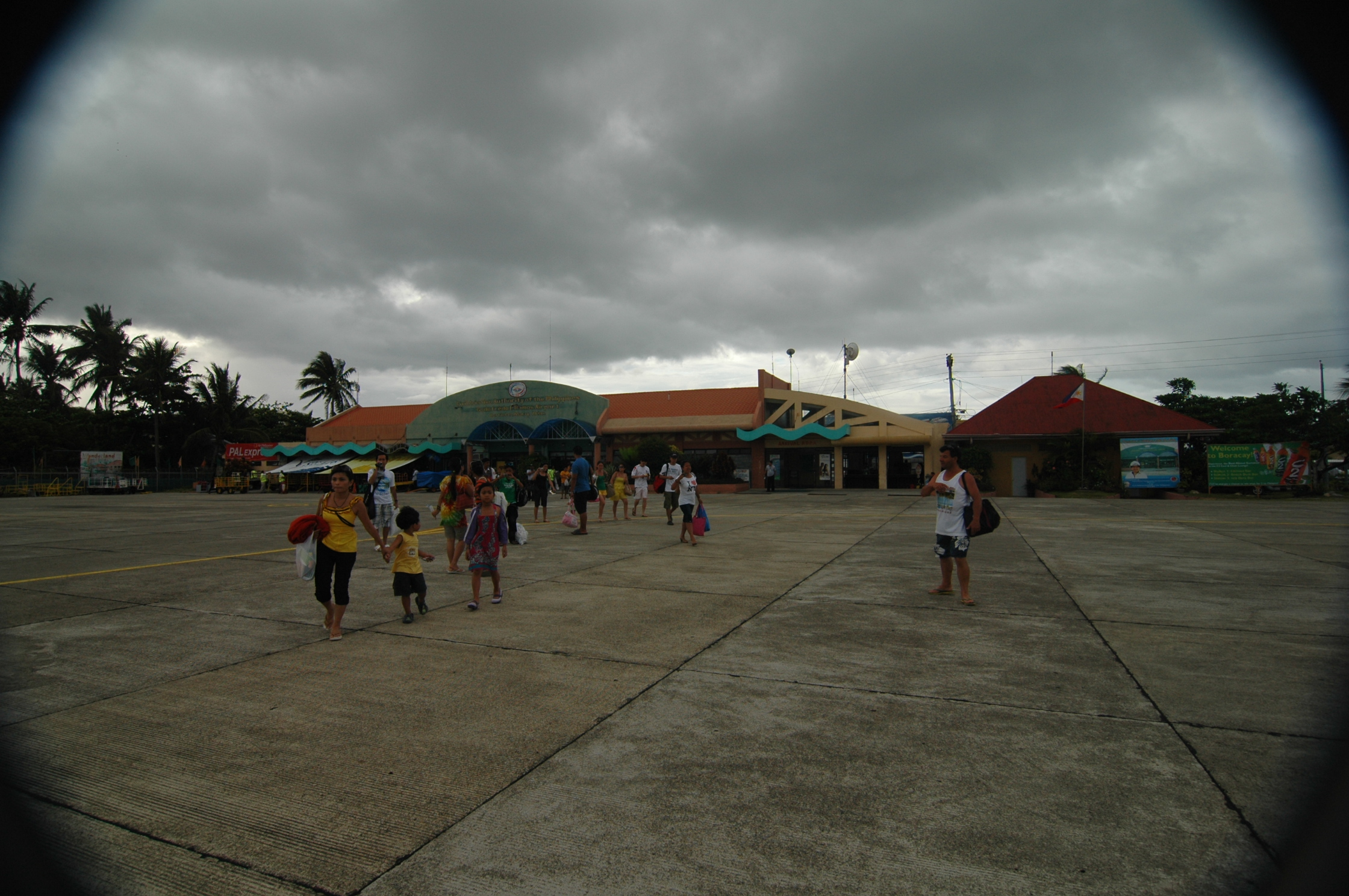
The airport terminal in 2009 prior to its renovation.

This airport was founded in 1935 as Tabung Point Airfield, an emergency landing strip in the municipality of Buruanga, then-located in the province of Capiz. In 1949, the newly-formed municipality of Malay was separated from Buruanga, and in 1956, the newly-formed province of Aklan was separated from Capiz.

Prior to 1996, chartered airlines served the airport until in April that year, Asian Spirit became the first scheduled airline to serve the airport, launching two daily flights from Manila using second-hand Dash 7 aircraft. South East Asian Airlines later followed in 2005 using Dornier 328 aircraft. In February 2008, Cebu Pacific launched flights to Caticlan using ATR 72-500 aircraft, followed by PAL Express on May 5 using Dash 8 Q300 aircraft.

Due to the airport's short runway prior to its expansion, the airport was restricted to small aircraft. As Boracay-bound tourists increased, passenger traffic increased, causing an increase in congestion at the airport which caused inconvenient service and safety hazards to travelers. From 1994 to 2004, the airport experienced an average annual growth of 31 percent.

In addition, during bad weather, flights are diverted to Kalibo International Airport, 68 kilometers (42 mi) from Caticlan.

=== Expansion ===
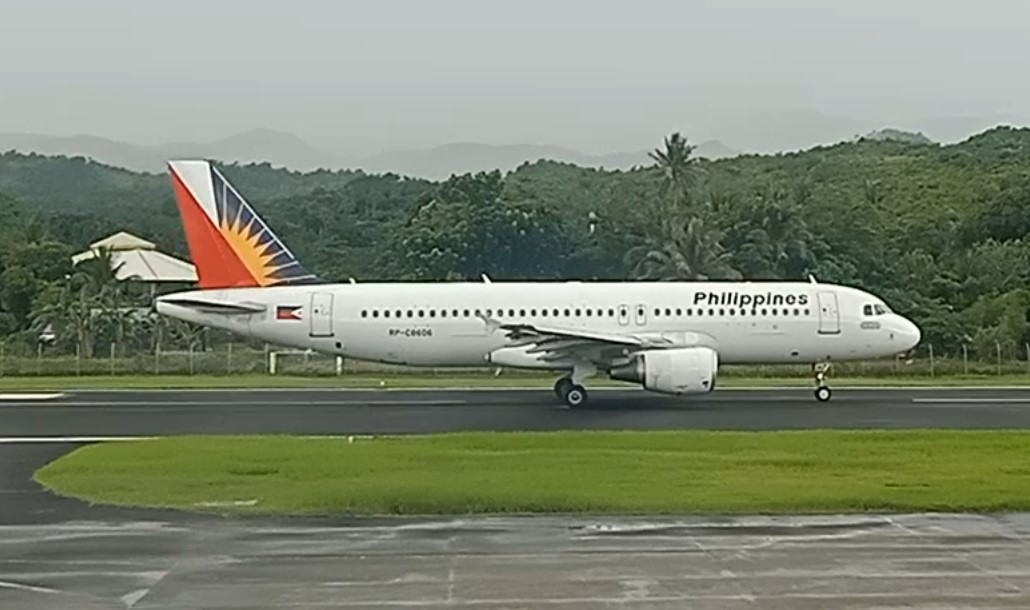
An Airbus A320 of PAL Express on the runway. PAL Express was the first airline to launch A320 flights to the airport.

In January 2008, the National Economic and Development Authority approved the expansion of the airport, which would be undertaken by the Caticlan International Airport and Development Corporation (CIADC), a private company. The ₱2.5 billion expansion of the airport would entail two stages: the construction of a new ₱2.1-billion passenger terminal in the first stage, and the extension of the existing runway from 950 meters (3,120 ft) to 2,100 meters (6,900 ft) as well as upgrading airport equipment and the existing apron, which would cost ₱360 million. The upgrading works would enable the airport not only to support jet aircraft but also to serve international destinations.

Solicited as a Build-Operate-Transfer project and financed by a 70-30 mixture of bank loan and private sector equity, around 25 percent of the allocated funds would be used to clear a hill near the airport's proximity, while an additional 18 percent would be allocated for land reclamation to accommodate an extended runway. The 25-year concession agreement was signed in 2009.

In January 2010, Boracay Foundation Inc. opposed the project due to the negative environmental effects of leveling a hill near the airport. The chairman of the foundation group said that leveling the hill would damage Boracay's ecosystem, while saying that the airport in Kalibo should be the international airport for a better environmental impact. The group also supported limited developments in Caticlan for domestic operations only.

In April 2010, San Miguel Corporation acquired a majority stake in CIADC. It earmarked US$300 million for the project in June 2011.

The airport terminal underwent renovations starting 2009 and was inaugurated on June 25, 2011, with President Benigno Aquino III leading the inauguration.

On November 18, 2016, the extended runway and new apron opened for commercial operations. The runway was extended to 1,800 meters (5,900 ft). The first Airbus A320 flight to land was Philippine Airlines Flight 2059 from Manila, a flight operated by PAL Express, on that day. Cebu Pacific followed suit on November 23, landing its first A320 flight as Flight 899. Both airlines upgraded most of their Caticlan flights to A320s, having previously served by turboprops. Philippines AirAsia, which operates an all-A320 fleet, launched flights to the airport on March 15, 2017, landing its first flight as Flight 221.

International flights commenced on December 26, 2022, when the first international flight, an Airbus A320 operating as Royal Air Philippines Flight 258 from Taoyuan International Airport, landed at the airport. This service, however was terminated in January 2026, due to the suspension of Royal Air Philippines' passenger services.

== Structure ==
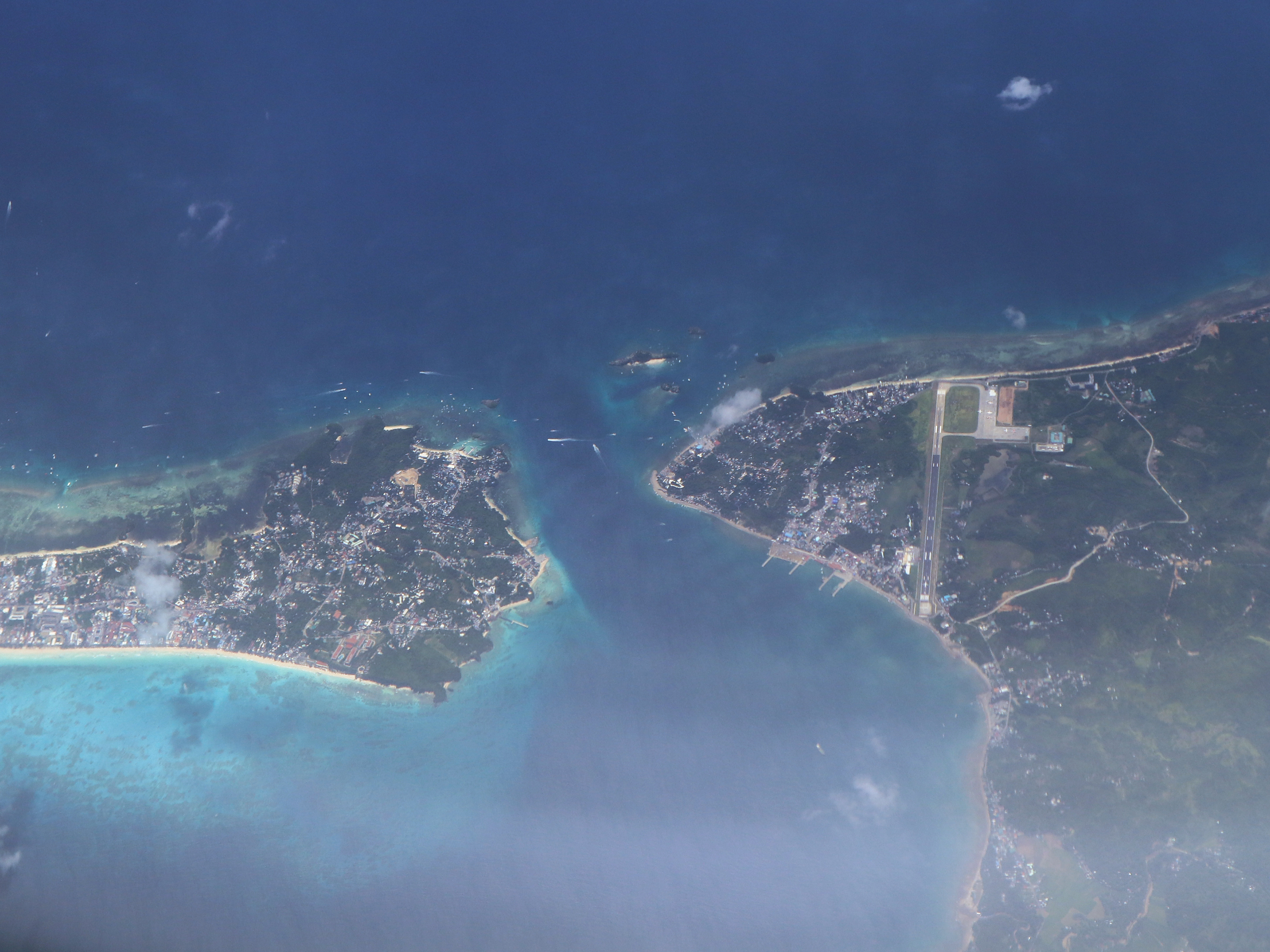
Aerial view of Boracay and Caticlan, with the airport on the right

=== Runway ===
The airport has a single 1,800-meter (5,900 ft) runway with a width of 45 meters (148 ft). It can accommodate aircraft as big as an A321 The runway was previously 950 meters (3,120 ft) long and 30 meters (98 ft) wide, restricting the airport to small turboprops. It was upgraded to the current dimensions in 2016.

Navigational equipment for night operations were installed in the runway, making the airport capable of night operations since 2017. Cebu Pacific became the first airline to operate night flights to the airport. During night flights, propeller-driven aircraft were utilized: Cebu Pacific uses ATR 72 while PAL uses the De-Havilland Q-400s.

=== Terminals and aprons ===
The old terminal used for departing passengers.

Godofredo P. Ramos Airport has two separate passenger terminals. The old terminal, located in Barangay Caticlan in Malay, is currently used for departing passengers. Its old apron used to handle four turboprop aircraft. It was used for both departing and arriving passengers until the opening of the new apron in the nearby municipality of Nabas. An interim terminal was built at the new apron and is used for arriving passengers to accommodate the increase in passenger traffic.

A permanent two-level passenger terminal building is currently under construction. Right-of-way issues delayed the terminal's construction, missing its initial completion target of 2018. San Miguel Corporation awarded the construction contract to Megawide on November 28, 2024. The terminal broke ground on July 14, 2025, with President Bongbong Marcos leading the ceremony. Once completed in 2027, the new 36,470-square-meter (392,600 sq ft) terminal would accommodate seven million passengers annually and have six jet bridges which protrude above a twelve-bay apron for Airbus A320 family aircraft.

== Airlines and destinations ==
Airlines	Destinations
Cebgo	Cebu (resumes October 26, 2026), El Nido
Cebu Pacific	Cebu, Clark, Davao, Manila
PAL Express	Cebu, Manila
Philippines AirAsia	Clark, Manila
Sunlight Air	Clark

== Statistics ==
Data from Civil Aviation Authority of the Philippines (CAAP).

Year	Passenger movements		Aircraft movements		Cargo movements (in kg)	
Year	Domestic	% change	Domestic	% change	Domestic	% change
2003	216,826	Steady	11,254	Steady	2,417,887	Steady
2004	392,484	▲81.01	15,404	▲36.88	2,856,501	▲18.14
2005	521,518	▲32.88	20,266	▲31.56	4,097,425	▲43.44
2006	519,044	▼0.47	19,762	▼2.49	4,477,032	▲9.26
2007	548,187	▲5.61	19,996	▲1.18	4,489,531	▲0.28
2008	761,961	▲39.00	23,868	▲19.36	6,275,264	▲39.78
2009	543,483	▼28.67	15,442	▼35.30	3,950,266	▼37.05
2010	623,545	▲14.73	24,196	▲56.69	5,362,766	▲35.76
2011	732,172	▲17.42	18,636	▼22.98	5,760,565	▲7.42
2012	595,564	▼18.66	15,956	▼14.38	5,001,827	▼13.17
2013	430,305	▼27.75	11,654	▼26.96	4,548,187	▼9.07
2014	507,621	▲17.97	12,558	▲7.76	5,580,874	▲22.71
2015	544,822	▲7.33	12,652	▲0.75	4,402,685	▼21.11
2016	736,559	▲35.19	14,438	▲14.12	4,844,437	▲10.03
2017	1,330,719	▲80.67	15,004	▲3.92	6,516,577	▲34.52
2018	902,594	▼32.17	10,232	▼31.80	6,412,936	▼1.59
2019	1,789,511	▲98.26	15,532	▲51.80	9,381,838	▲46.30
2020	439,893	▼75.42	4,176	▼73.11	2,709,790	▼71.12
2021	599,956	▲36.39	5,956	▲42.62	5,376,428	▲98.41
2022	2,308,195	▲284.73	18,500	▲210.61	11,037,225	▲105.29

== Incidents and accidents ==
- On July 19, 2005, Interisland Airlines aircraft RP-C2803, an arriving Yakovlev 40A aircraft touched down short of runway 06. A tire burst as it struck the raised lip of the runway. When removing the airplane from the runway the undercarriage collapsed, causing substantial damage to the aircraft. The aircraft was occupied by 3 crew and 20 passengers. There were no fatalities.
- On November 2, 2006, Interisland Airlines aircraft RP-C2695, a Yakovlev 40A aircraft, arrived to pick up a group of tourists. On landing at runway 06, the left main gear tire burst. The aircraft started to swerve to the left, towards the apron were a DHC-7 had just started engines. The crew avoided collision with the DHC-7. After passing the apron, the Yakovlev 40A drifted sideways entering the grass on the left side of the runway. Because of lateral forces, the right main gear collapsed. The aircraft came to rest on the edge of the runway. After three hours the airplane was towed off the runway into the grass. On arrival, the aircraft had no passengers. There were no fatalities.
- On January 11, 2009, Zest Airways Flight 865, a Xian MA60 with 22 passengers three crew aboard, undershot runway 06 when it landed, swerved sharply to the left when it touched the runway after the initial impact and hit a concrete barrier seriously damaging its nose. The plane's landing gears and propellers also suffered major damage. Three people were injured. There were no fatalities.
- On June 25, 2009, Zest Airways Flight 863, a Xian MA60 with 54 passengers and five crew aboard, overshot the runway when it landed at the airport. The aircraft totally lost its braking capability, causing it to overshoot runway 24. There were no injuries.
