= Cebgo =

Regional airline of the Philippines

Cebgo, Inc.
IATA	ICAO	Call sign
DG	SRQ	BLUE JAY
- Founded: 1995; 31 years ago (as South East Asian Airlines); June 2013; 13 years ago (as Tigerair Philippines)
- Commenced operations: 1995; 31 years ago (as South East Asian Airlines); July 10, 2013; 13 years ago (as Tigerair Philippines); May 11, 2015; 11 years ago (as Cebgo)
- AOC #: 2009004
- Operating bases: Cebu; Clark; Davao; El Nido; Iloilo
- Frequent-flyer program: GoRewards
- Fleet size: 22
- Destinations: 30
- Parent company: Cebu Pacific
- Headquarters: Pasay, Metro Manila, Philippines
- Key people: Alexander G. Lao (president & CEO)
- Website: www.cebupacificair.com

Cebgo (stylized in all lowercase) is a wholly owned regional subsidiary of Cebu Pacific. It is the successor company to South East Asian Airlines and Tigerair Philippines. It is now owned by JG Summit, the parent company of Cebu Pacific which operates the airline. The airline's main base has been transferred from Clark International Airport in Angeles City to Ninoy Aquino International Airport in Metro Manila. On April 30, 2017, Cebgo planned to move out from Manila and transfer its main base to Mactan–Cebu International Airport in Cebu City because NAIA has already maxed out its capacity. Currently, it operates an all-ATR fleet, with a total of 16 in service.

== History ==
=== Early years ===
The airline was established as South East Asian Airlines (SEAir) in 1995 and started operations in the same year. However, its franchise was granted by the Congress of the Philippines only on May 13, 2009, through Republic Act No. 9517.

The airline received its corporate registration from the Securities and Exchange Commission on March 25, 1995 mainly to operate aircraft leasing, chartering and a few domestic scheduled flights. In May 1995, the airline was registered with the Clark Special Economic Zone to operate services in the Clark-Manila-Subic area and to tourist destinations throughout the Luzon and the Visayas regions. It continued expanding its routes and opened a hub in Zamboanga City in 2002.

=== Partnership with Tigerair ===
On September 29, 2006, a deal was announced in which Singapore-based Tigerair would enter a commercial and operational tie-up with SEAir from February 2007. The tie-up was finally approved in 2008 after protest from four other Philippine airlines. However, due to the unfavorable operating environment, the plan was put into hiatus. Tigerair and SEAir revisited the partnership plan in 2010 and it was officially launched on December 16, 2010. Seats on flights operated by SEAir using two aircraft leased from Tigerair were sold and marketed by Tigerair for SEAir. Shortly after SEAir and Tigerair launched the partnership, Philippine Airlines, Cebu Pacific, Zest Airways and Air Philippines sent a letter of protest to the Department of Transportation and Communications claiming the partnership between SEAir and Tigerair was illegal and requested the authorities to stop flights operating under the partnership. The Tigerair-SEAir partnership began with international flights from Clark to Singapore, Hong Kong, and Macau. It was then expanded to domestic destination from Manila (NAIA) to Davao and Cebu (slated to launch in July 2011). However, the Civil Aeronautics Board (CAB) ordered the sales of the domestic flight under the partnership to be suspended on May 20, 2011, after receiving complaints from Philippine Airlines and Cebu Pacific. Since the ban from CAB was lifted in October 2011, the planned domestic flight (between Manila (NAIA) to Davao and Cebu) was scheduled to start in May 2012.

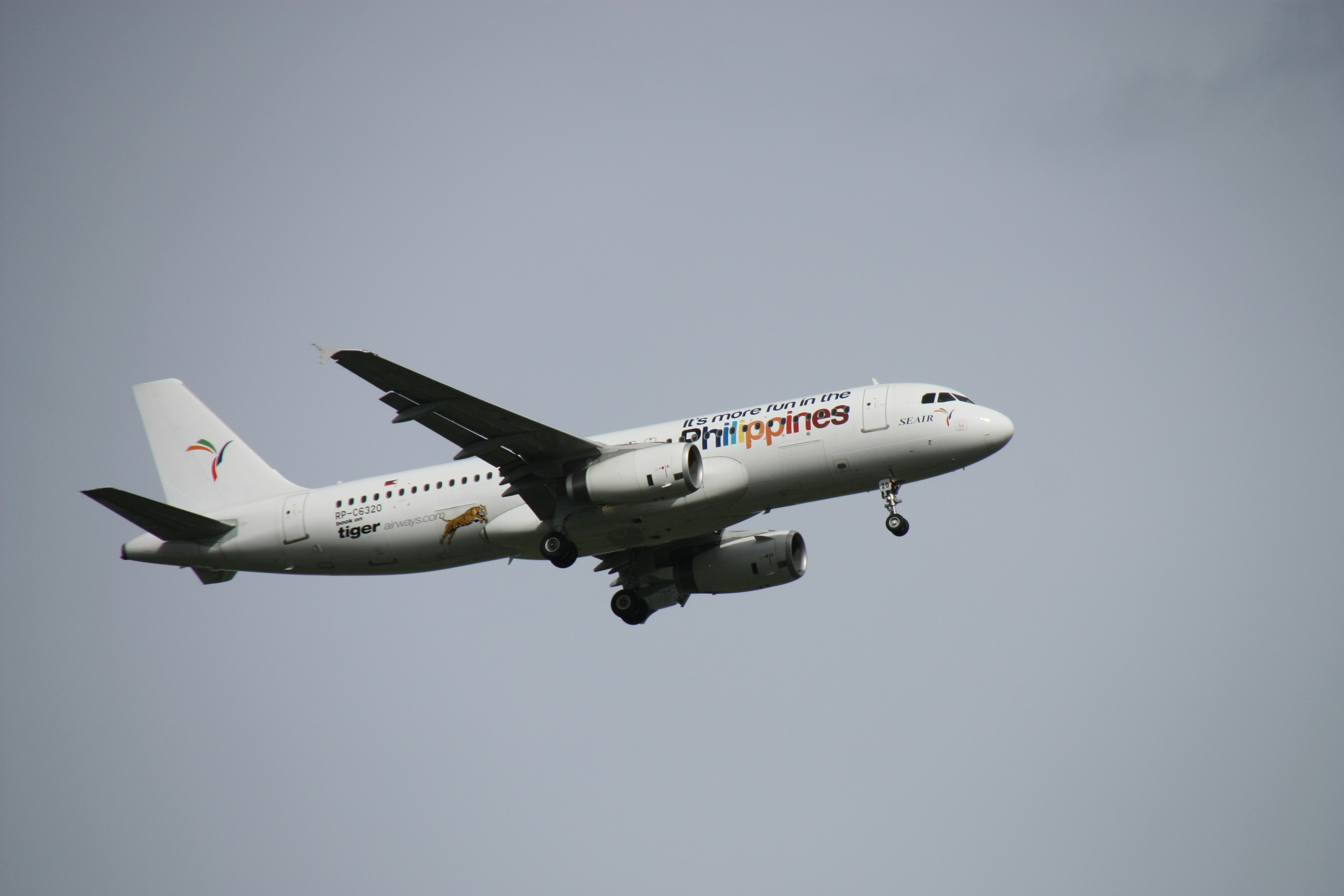
An Airbus A320 in the Tigerair-SEAir livery (2012)

In February 2011, Tiger Airways Holdings Ltd., parent company of Tigerair, purchased 32.5% shares of SEAir. They increased their shares to 40% in August 2012.

In December 2012, CAB approved SEAir's application to form SEAir International, a full-service airline focusing on domestic and international leisure destinations. It operates independently from SEAir Inc., which was rebranded as Tigerair Philippines. Due to the exclusion of turboprop aircraft under a share sale agreement between SEAir and Tigerair, the turboprop fleet of SEAir Inc. was transferred to SEAir International.

SEAir was rebranded as Tigerair Philippines in June 2013.

=== Acquisition by Cebu Pacific ===
On January 8, 2014, Cebu Pacific announced that it was acquiring the entirety of Tigerair Philippines for ₱672 million (US$15 million) by purchasing all shares. On May 11, 2015, Tigerair Philippines was rebranded as Cebgo to reflect the relationship between Tigerair Philippines as a wholly owned subsidiary airline of its parent company Cebu Pacific.

In July 2015, Cebu Pacific announced plans to consolidate its operations to a fleet of jet aircraft while transferring its ATR 72-500 turboprop aircraft to Cebgo. In the same year, Cebu Pacific ceased turboprop operations, while Cebgo ceased jet operations with the return of its last Airbus A320 to its parent company.

In February 2018, after a crowdsourcing campaign was launched in 2017, Cebu Pacific announced it was flying to Batanes, the most requested destination in the campaign. The route's inaugural flight was on March 25, 2018, but flights to Batanes ended on October 27 of the same year.

Like Cebu Pacific, Cebgo's operations were affected by the COVID-19 pandemic. Both airlines suspended operations during the enhanced community quarantine in Luzon in 2020.

== Destinations ==
As of October 2026, Cebgo flies to 30 domestic destinations within the Philippines. It operates from its bases in Cebu, Clark, Davao, El Nido, and Iloilo.

== Fleet ==
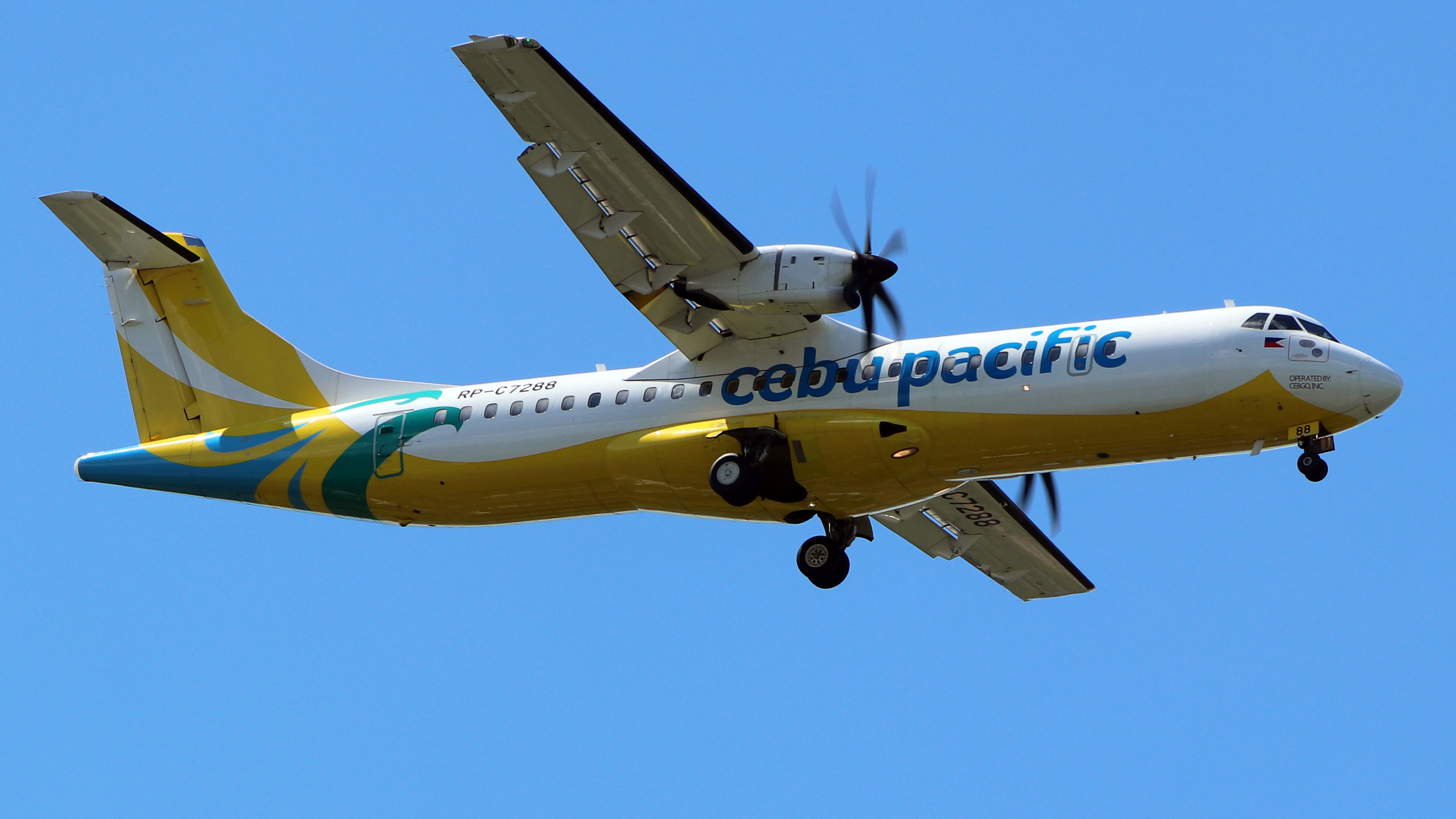
ATR 72-600

=== Current fleet ===
As of July 2026, Cebgo operates the following aircraft:

Cebgo fleet
Aircraft	In service	Orders	Passengers	Notes
ATR 42-600	2	0	48	ex-AirSWIFT aircraft
ATR 72-600	3	0	72	ex-AirSWIFT aircraft
ATR 72-600	15	1	78	
Total	20	1		

On June 16, 2015, at the 2015 Paris Air Show, Cebu Pacific announced orders for 16 ATR 72-600 aircraft, with options for 10 more, for its regional subsidiary Cebgo to meet growing demand for domestic services. The airline is the launch customer of the high-density Armonia cabin, which seats up to 78 passengers.

In August 2019, Cebgo's first ATR 72-500 freighter, RP-C7252, arrived in the country. The aircraft was among the few dedicated cargo aircraft, as the Philippines' cargo movement were mostly catered in passenger aircraft's cargo compartments. Soon after, the airline then took delivery of its second ATR 72-500 converted freighter aircraft in December 2020.

== Incidents and accidents ==
- On September 26, 2016, flight DG6577, from Cebu to Tacloban, utilizing an ATR 72-500, was taking off from Cebu's runway 22 when the crew observed fluctuations on oil indications for the left-hand engine and decided to reject the takeoff. A fire was discovered on both left hand main wheels while taxiing, leading the crew to stop on the taxiway and begin an evacuation of the aircraft. One passenger received minor injuries during the evacuation.
- On October 1, 2017, flight DG6273, from Caticlan to Cebu, utilizing an ATR 72-500, the crew received fault messages for multiple systems shortly after taking off and landed back safely. The Civil Aviation Authority of the Philippines rated the occurrence a serious incident and opened an investigation.
- On November 1, 2018, flight DG6717, an ATR 72-600 from Cebu City to Cagayan de Oro experienced engine fire on takeoff. The engine was shut down and a fire drill was performed. The aircraft safely landed back at Mactan Cebu International Airport. No injuries to passengers or crew were reported.
- On March 8, 2022, flight DG6112 from Naga utilizing an ATR 72-600 aircraft experienced a runway excursion while landing at Ninoy Aquino International Airport in Manila. Following the incident, all 46 passengers and crew disembarked safely, and no injuries were reported.
