= List of Philippine Airlines destinations =

Philippine Airlines and its regional subsidiary PAL Express serve 30 domestic destinations and 41 international destinations across Asia, North America, and Oceania.

The list presents each destination by city, country (or territory), and airport name, with airline hubs indicated. It also includes notes if the service is seasonal, discontinued, or scheduled to launch in the future. For upcoming destinations, the list specifies the dates when service will commence. Japan is the most served foreign country, with six airports, followed by the United States, with five airports, and then by China and Australia, each with four.

Some discontinued destinations may currently be accessible through codeshare agreements with partner airlines.

== Philippine Airlines ==
Country or territory	City	Airport	Notes	Refs
Australia	Brisbane	Brisbane Airport		
Australia	Brisbane	Eagle Farm Airport	Airport closed	
Australia	Cairns	Cairns Airport	Terminated	
Australia	Darwin	Darwin International Airport	Terminated	
Australia	Melbourne	Melbourne Airport		
Australia	Perth	Perth Airport		
Australia	Sydney	Sydney Airport		
Bahrain	Manama	Bahrain International Airport	Terminated	
Brunei	Bandar Seri Begawan	Brunei International Airport	Terminated	
Cambodia	Phnom Penh	Phnom Penh International Airport	Terminated^{1}	
Canada	Toronto	Toronto Pearson International Airport		
Canada	Vancouver	Vancouver International Airport		
China	Beijing	Beijing Capital International Airport		
China	Chengdu	Chengdu Shuangliu International Airport	Terminated	
China	Chongqing	Chongqing Jiangbei International Airport	Terminated	
China	Guangzhou	Guangzhou Baiyun International Airport	Terminated	
China	Guangzhou	Old Guangzhou Baiyun International Airport	Airport closed	
China	Hangzhou	Hangzhou Xiaoshan International Airport	Terminated	
China	Nanning	Nanning Wuxu International Airport	Terminated	
China	Quanzhou	Quanzhou Jinjiang International Airport		
China	Shanghai	Shanghai Longhua Airport	Airport closed	
China	Shanghai	Shanghai Pudong International Airport		
China	Wuhan	Wuhan Tianhe International Airport	Terminated	
China	Xiamen	Xiamen Gaoqi International Airport		
Egypt	Cairo	Cairo International Airport	Terminated	
France	Paris	Charles de Gaulle Airport	Terminated	
France	Paris	Orly Airport	Terminated	
Germany	Frankfurt	Frankfurt Airport	Terminated	
Germany	Hamburg	Hamburg Airport	Terminated	
Greece	Athens	Ellinikon International Airport	Terminated	
Guam	Hagåtña	Antonio B. Won Pat International Airport		
Hong Kong	Hong Kong	Hong Kong International Airport		
Hong Kong	Hong Kong	Kai Tak Airport	Airport closed	
India	Delhi	Indira Gandhi International Airport	Resumes December 14, 2026	
India	Kolkata	Netaji Subhas Chandra Bose International Airport	Terminated	
India	Mumbai	Chhatrapati Shivaji Maharaj International Airport	Begins December 15, 2026	
Indonesia	Denpasar	Ngurah Rai International Airport		
Indonesia	Jakarta	Halim Perdanakusuma International Airport	Terminated	
Indonesia	Jakarta	Kemayoran Airport	Airport closed	
Indonesia	Jakarta	Soekarno–Hatta International Airport		
Israel	Tel Aviv	Ben Gurion Airport	Terminated	
Italy	Rome	Rome Ciampino Airport	Terminated	
Italy	Rome	Rome Fiumicino Airport	Terminated	
Japan	Fukuoka	Fukuoka Airport		
Japan	Nagoya	Chubu Centrair International Airport		
Japan	Naha	Naha Airport	Terminated	
Japan	Osaka	Kansai International Airport		
Japan	Sapporo	New Chitose Airport	Seasonal	
Japan	Tokyo	Haneda Airport		
Japan	Tokyo	Narita International Airport		
Kuwait	Kuwait City	Kuwait International Airport	Terminated	
Lebanon	Beirut	Bir Hassan Airfield	Airport closed	
Macau	Macau	Macau International Airport	Terminated	
Malaysia	Kota Kinabalu	Kota Kinabalu International Airport	Terminated	
Malaysia	Kuala Lumpur	Kuala Lumpur International Airport		
Malaysia	Kuala Lumpur	Sultan Abdul Aziz Shah Airport	Terminated	
Mexico	Mexico City	Mexico City International Airport	Terminated	
Netherlands	Amsterdam	Amsterdam Airport Schiphol	Terminated	
New Zealand	Auckland	Auckland Airport	Terminated	
Pakistan	Karachi	Jinnah International Airport	Terminated	
Palau	Koror	Roman Tmetuchl International Airport		
Papua New Guinea	Port Moresby	Port Moresby International Airport		
Philippines (Luzon)	Aparri	Maura Airport	Terminated	
Philippines (Luzon)	Bagabag	Bagabag Airport	Terminated	
Philippines (Luzon)	Baguio	Loakan Airport	Terminated^{1}	
Philippines (Luzon)	Baler	Dr. Juan C. Angara Airport	Terminated	
Philippines (Luzon)	Basco	Basco Airport	Terminated^{1}	
Philippines (Luzon)	Calapan	Calapan Airport	Terminated	
Philippines (Luzon)	Cauayan	Cauayan Airport	Terminated^{1}	
Philippines (Luzon)	Clark	Clark International Airport	Seasonal	
Philippines (Luzon)	Daet	Bagasbas Airport	Terminated	
Philippines (Luzon)	Jose Panganiban	Larap Airstrip	Terminated	
Philippines (Luzon)	Laoag	Laoag International Airport	Terminated^{1}	
Philippines (Luzon)	Legazpi	Legazpi Airport	Airport closed	
Philippines (Luzon)	Lubang	Lubang Airport	Terminated	
Philippines (Luzon)	Mamburao	Mamburao Airport	Terminated	
Philippines (Luzon)	Manila	Nielson Field	Airport closed	
Philippines (Luzon)	Manila	Ninoy Aquino International Airport	Hub	
Philippines (Luzon)	Marinduque	Marinduque Airport	Terminated	
Philippines (Luzon)	Masbate	Moises R. Espinosa Airport	Terminated^{1}	
Philippines (Luzon)	Naga	Naga Airport	Terminated^{1}	
Philippines (Luzon)	Olongapo	Subic Bay International Airport	Terminated	
Philippines (Luzon)	Puerto Princesa	Puerto Princesa International Airport		
Philippines (Luzon)	Roxas	Del Pilar Airfield	Terminated	
Philippines (Luzon)	San Fernando	San Fernando Airport	Terminated	
Philippines (Luzon)	San Jose	San Jose Airport	Terminated^{1}	
Philippines (Luzon)	Tablas	Tugdan Airport	Terminated^{1}	
Philippines (Luzon)	Tuguegarao	Tuguegarao Airport	Terminated^{1}	
Philippines (Luzon)	Virac	Virac Airport	Terminated^{1}	
Philippines (Mindanao)	Bislig	Bislig Airport	Terminated	
Philippines (Mindanao)	Butuan	Bancasi Airport	Terminated^{1}	
Philippines (Mindanao)	Cabadbaran	Doña Rosario Airstrip	Terminated	
Philippines (Mindanao)	Cagayan de Oro	Laguindingan Airport	Terminated^{1}	
Philippines (Mindanao)	Cagayan de Oro	Lumbia Airport	Airport closed	
Philippines (Mindanao)	Camiguin	Camiguin Airport	Terminated^{1}	
Philippines (Mindanao)	Cotabato	Awang Airport	Terminated^{1}	
Philippines (Mindanao)	Davao	Francisco Bangoy International Airport		
Philippines (Mindanao)	Dipolog	Dipolog Airport	Terminated^{1}	
Philippines (Mindanao)	General Santos	Buayan Airport	Airport closed	
Philippines (Mindanao)	General Santos	General Santos International Airport		
Philippines (Mindanao)	Gingoog	Gingoog Airfield	Terminated	
Philippines (Mindanao)	Iligan	Maria Cristina Airport	Airport closed	
Philippines (Mindanao)	Ipil	Ipil Airport	Terminated	
Philippines (Mindanao)	Jolo	Jolo Airport	Terminated^{1}	
Philippines (Mindanao)	Kiamba	Kling Airstrip	Terminated	
Philippines (Mindanao)	Lebak	Lebak Rural Airport	Terminated	
Philippines (Mindanao)	Lianga	Diatagon Airstrip	Terminated	
Philippines (Mindanao)	Liloy	Liloy Airport	Terminated	
Philippines (Mindanao)	Maitum	Kalaong Airstrip	Terminated	
Philippines (Mindanao)	Malabang	Malabang Airport	Terminated	
Philippines (Mindanao)	Malaybalay	Malaybalay Airport	Airport closed	
Philippines (Mindanao)	Mati	Mati Airport	Terminated	
Philippines (Mindanao)	Ozamiz	Labo Airport	Terminated^{1}	
Philippines (Mindanao)	Pagadian	Pagadian Airport	Terminated^{1}	
Philippines (Mindanao)	Siargao	Sayak Airport	Terminated^{1}	
Philippines (Mindanao)	Siocon	Siocon Airport	Terminated	
Philippines (Mindanao)	Surallah	Allah Valley Airport	Terminated	
Philippines (Mindanao)	Surigao	Surigao Airport	Terminated^{1}	
Philippines (Mindanao)	Tacurong	Kenram Airport	Terminated	
Philippines (Mindanao)	Tandag	Tandag Airport	Terminated	
Philippines (Mindanao)	Tawi-Tawi	Sanga-Sanga Airport	Terminated^{1}	
Philippines (Mindanao)	Zamboanga	Zamboanga International Airport	Terminated^{1}	
Philippines (Visayas)	Bacolod	Bacolod City Domestic Airport	Airport closed	
Philippines (Visayas)	Bacolod	Bacolod–Silay Airport	Terminated^{1}	
Philippines (Visayas)	Calbayog	Calbayog Airport	Terminated^{1}	
Philippines (Visayas)	Catarman	Catarman National Airport	Terminated^{1}	
Philippines (Visayas)	Cebu	Lahug Airport	Airport closed	
Philippines (Visayas)	Cebu	Mactan–Cebu International Airport	Secondary hub	
Philippines (Visayas)	Dumaguete	Sibulan Airport	Terminated^{1}	
Philippines (Visayas)	Guiuan	Guiuan Airport	Terminated	
Philippines (Visayas)	Hilongos	Hilongos Airport	Terminated	
Philippines (Visayas)	Iloilo	Iloilo International Airport		
Philippines (Visayas)	Iloilo	Mandurriao Airport	Airport closed	
Philippines (Visayas)	Kalibo	Kalibo International Airport	Terminated^{1}	
Philippines (Visayas)	Roxas	Roxas Airport	Terminated^{1}	
Philippines (Visayas)	San Carlos	San Carlos City Airport	Terminated	
Philippines (Visayas)	San Jose de Buenavista	Evelio Javier Airport	Terminated^{1}	
Philippines (Visayas)	Tacloban	Daniel Z. Romualdez Airport	Terminated^{1}	
Philippines (Visayas)	Tagbilaran	Bohol–Panglao International Airport	Terminated^{1}	
Philippines (Visayas)	Tagbilaran	Tagbilaran Airport	Airport closed	
Philippines (Visayas)	Toledo	Sangi Airstrip	Terminated	
Qatar	Doha	Hamad International Airport		
Russia	Khabarovsk	Khabarovsk Novy Airport^{Charter}	Terminated	
Russia	Vladivostok	Vladivostok International Airport^{Charter}	Terminated	
Saudi Arabia	Dammam	King Fahd International Airport	Terminated	
Saudi Arabia	Dhahran	Dhahran International Airport	Airport closed	
Saudi Arabia	Jeddah	King Abdulaziz International Airport	Terminated	
Saudi Arabia	Jeddah	Kandara Airport	Airport closed	
Saudi Arabia	Medina	Prince Mohammad bin Abdulaziz International Airport	Seasonal charter	
Saudi Arabia	Riyadh	King Khalid International Airport		
Singapore	Singapore	Changi Airport		
Singapore	Singapore	Singapore International Airport	Airport closed	
South Korea	Busan	Gimhae International Airport		
South Korea	Jeju	Jeju International Airport	Seasonal charter	
South Korea	Seoul	Gimpo International Airport	Terminated	
South Korea	Seoul	Incheon International Airport		
South Korea	Yangyang	Yangyang International Airport^{Charter}	Terminated	
Spain	Madrid	Adolfo Suárez Madrid–Barajas Airport	Terminated	
Switzerland	Zurich	Zurich Airport	Terminated	
Taiwan	Kaohsiung	Kaohsiung International Airport	Terminated	
Taiwan	Taipei	Songshan Airport	Terminated	
Taiwan	Taipei	Taoyuan International Airport		
Thailand	Bangkok	Don Mueang International Airport	Terminated	
Thailand	Bangkok	Suvarnabhumi Airport		
United Arab Emirates	Abu Dhabi	Zayed International Airport	Terminated	
United Arab Emirates	Dubai	Dubai International Airport		
United Kingdom	London	Gatwick Airport	Terminated	
United Kingdom	London	Heathrow Airport	Terminated	
United States	Chicago	O'Hare International Airport		
United States	Honolulu	Daniel K. Inouye International Airport		
United States	Las Vegas	Harry Reid International Airport	Terminated	
United States	Los Angeles	Los Angeles International Airport		
United States	New York City	John F. Kennedy International Airport		
United States	Newark	Newark Liberty International Airport	Terminated	
United States	Oakland	Oakland San Francisco Bay Airport	Terminated	
United States	San Francisco	San Francisco International Airport		
United States	Seattle	Seattle–Tacoma International Airport		
Vietnam	Da Nang	Da Nang International Airport		
Vietnam	Hanoi	Noi Bai International Airport		
Vietnam	Ho Chi Minh City	Tan Son Nhat International Airport		

Destination maps
Domestic destinations of Philippine Airlines mainline
Hub
Current destination
Seasonal/charter destination
Future destination
Former destination
International (Asia) destinations of Philippine Airlines mainline
Hub
Current destination
Seasonal/charter destination
Future destination
Former destination
International (outside Asia) destinations of Philippine Airlines mainline
Current destination
Seasonal/charter destination
Future destination
Former destination

Notes
^1: These destinations have since been operated by PAL Express.

== PAL Express ==
Country or territory	City	Airport	Notes	Refs
Cambodia	Phnom Penh	Phnom Penh International Airport	Airport closed	
Cambodia	Phnom Penh	Techo International Airport		
China	Chengdu	Chengdu Shuangliu International Airport	Terminated	
China	Hangzhou	Hangzhou Xiaoshan International Airport	Terminated	
China	Nanjing	Nanjing Lukou International Airport	Terminated	
China	Shanghai	Shanghai Pudong International Airport	Terminated	
Hong Kong	Hong Kong	Hong Kong International Airport	Terminated	
Malaysia	Kuala Lumpur	Kuala Lumpur International Airport	Terminated	
Northern Mariana Islands	Saipan	Saipan International Airport		
Philippines	Bacolod	Bacolod–Silay Airport		
Philippines	Baguio	Loakan Airport	Terminated	
Philippines	Basco	Basco Airport		
Philippines	Borongan	Borongan Airport		
Philippines	Busuanga	Francisco B. Reyes Airport		
Philippines	Butuan	Bancasi Airport		
Philippines	Cagayan de Oro	Laguindingan Airport		
Philippines	Calbayog	Calbayog Airport		
Philippines	Camiguin	Camiguin Airport	Terminated	
Philippines	Catarman	Catarman National Airport		
Philippines	Caticlan	Godofredo P. Ramos Airport		
Philippines	Cauayan	Cauayan Airport		
Philippines	Cebu	Mactan–Cebu International Airport	Secondary hub	
Philippines	Clark	Clark International Airport	Secondary hub	
Philippines	Cotabato	Awang Airport		
Philippines	Davao	Francisco Bangoy International Airport	Secondary hub	
Philippines	Dipolog	Dipolog Airport		
Philippines	Dumaguete	Sibulan Airport		
Philippines	General Santos	General Santos International Airport		
Philippines	Iloilo	Iloilo International Airport		
Philippines	Jolo	Jolo Airport	Terminated	
Philippines	Kalibo	Kalibo International Airport	Terminated	
Philippines	Laoag	Laoag International Airport		
Philippines	Legazpi	Bicol International Airport		
Philippines	Legazpi	Legazpi Airport	Airport closed	
Philippines	Manila	Ninoy Aquino International Airport	Hub	
Philippines	Masbate	Moises R. Espinosa Airport	Terminated	
Philippines	Naga	Naga Airport	Terminated	
Philippines	Ozamiz	Labo Airport		
Philippines	Pagadian	Pagadian Airport	Terminated	
Philippines	Puerto Princesa	Puerto Princesa International Airport		
Philippines	Roxas	Roxas Airport		
Philippines	San Jose de Buenavista	Evelio Javier Airport	Terminated	
Philippines	San Jose, Mindoro	San Jose Airport	Terminated	
Philippines	San Vicente	San Vicente Airport	Terminated	
Philippines	Siargao	Sayak Airport		
Philippines	Surigao	Surigao Airport	Terminated	
Philippines	Tablas	Tugdan Airport	Terminated	
Philippines	Tacloban	Daniel Z. Romualdez Airport		
Philippines	Tagbilaran	Bohol–Panglao International Airport		
Philippines	Tagbilaran	Tagbilaran Airport	Airport closed	
Philippines	Tawi-Tawi	Sanga-Sanga Airport		
Philippines	Tuguegarao	Tuguegarao Airport		
Philippines	Virac	Virac Airport	Terminated	
Philippines	Zamboanga	Zamboanga International Airport	Focus city	
Singapore	Singapore	Changi Airport	Terminated	
South Korea	Seoul	Incheon International Airport	Terminated	
United Arab Emirates	Dubai	Al Maktoum International Airport	Terminated	
United Arab Emirates	Dubai	Dubai International Airport	Terminated	

Destinations maps
Domestic destinations of PAL Express (excluding that of Philippine Airlines); airplane icons: PAL Express hubs, red: all-year round, yellow: future destinations, black: terminated destinations
Asian destinations of PAL Express (excluding that of Philippine Airlines); airplane icons: PAL Express hubs, red: all-year round, black: terminated or suspended destinations, yellow: future destinations, pink: seasonal service, turquoise: charter
