= RPMC =

RPMC may refer to:

== Computers and mathematics ==
- Read-only memory, a type of storage media that is used in computers and other electronic devices

== ICAO airport code ==
- Cotabato Airport
