= Bangsamoro Airways =

Airline of the Philippines

IATA	ICAO	Call sign
TBD	TBD	TBD
- Commenced operations: April 24, 2024; 2 years ago
- Operating bases: Cotabato Airport
- Fleet size: 5
- Destinations: 3
- Parent company: Federal Airways Inc
- Website: www.bangsamoroair.com

Federal Airways Inc., operating as Bangsamoro Airways, is a Philippine-registered airline based in Datu Odin Sinsuat, Maguindanao del Norte, in the Bangsamoro Autonomous Region in Muslim Mindanao.

== History ==
Bangsamoro Airways was established by Federal Airways Inc., and is backed by Filipino and Malaysian businesspeople. The airline which has Cotabato Airport in Datu Odin Sinsuat, Maguindanao del Norte as its hub, is meant to serve the Bangsamoro autonomous region.

The airline had its maiden flight on April 24, 2024, with initial routes serving Cotabato City, Zamboanga City and Jolo, Sulu, with possible expansion towards flights serving Sibutu and Mapun in Tawi-Tawi as well as international flights to Kota Kinabalu, across the border in Malaysia. The airline intends to serve government officials, medical supplies distributors and businesspeople as its primary target demographic.

== Destinations ==
City	Airport	Notes	References
Cotabato City	Cotabato Airport	Base	
Jolo	Jolo Airport		
Zamboanga City	Zamboanga International Airport		

== Fleet ==
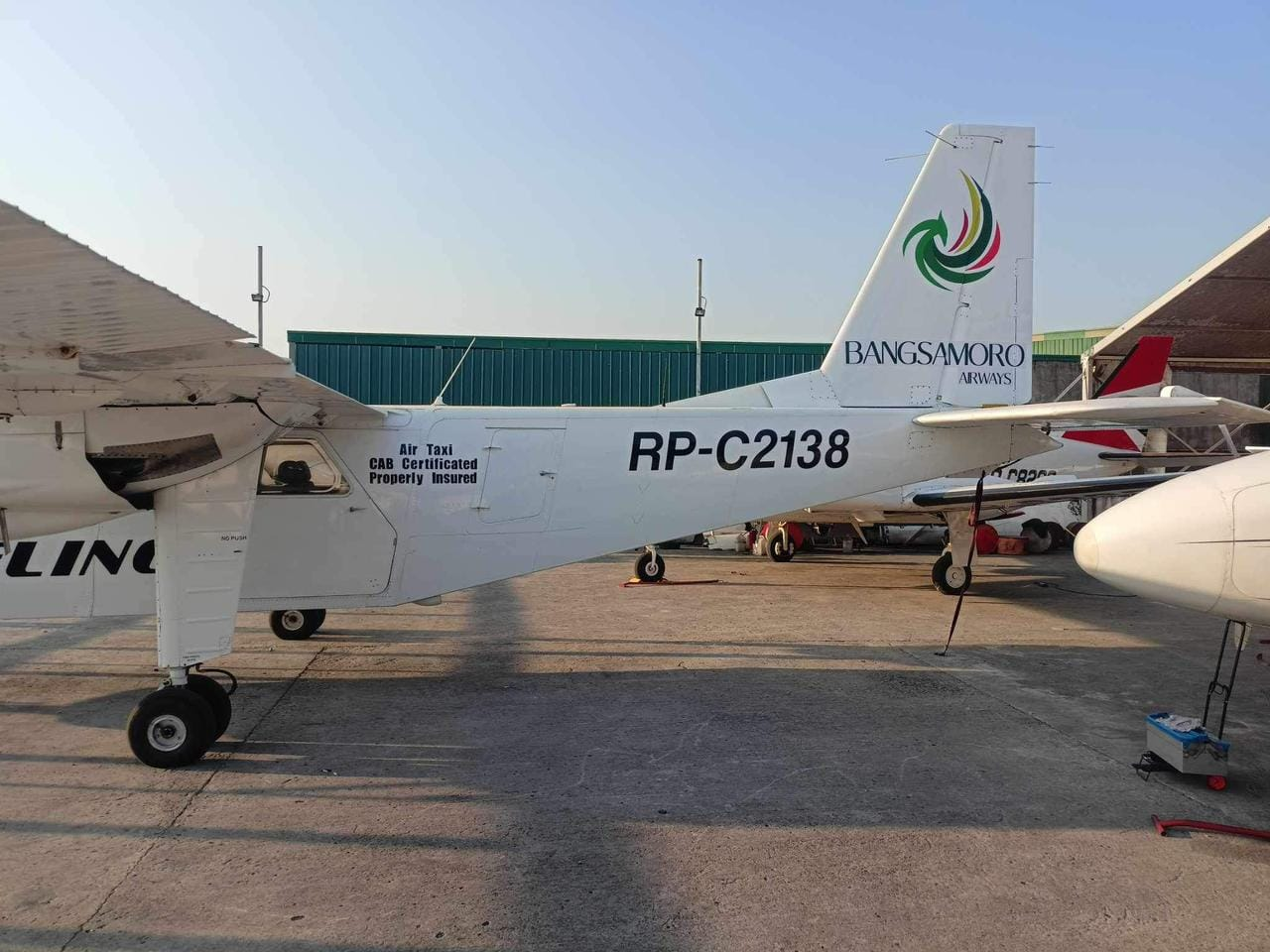
Bangsamoro Airways BN-2 Islander regional airliner aircraft.

As of April 24, 2024, Bangsamoro Airways operates five units of aircraft. These include the Chieftain, the Aztec Piper, and the Islander.
