= General Santos International Airport =

Commercial airport in Soccsksargen, Philippines

General Santos International Airport Tugpahanang Pangkalibutanon sa Heneral Santos Pangkalibutan nga Hulugpaan sang Heneral Santos Paliparang Pandaigdig ng Heneral Santos
- The airport in August 2023
- IATA: GES; ICAO: RPMR; WMO: 98851

Summary
- Airport type: Public
- Owner/Operator: Civil Aviation Authority of the Philippines
- Serves: Sarangani and South Cotabato
- Location: Barangays Fatima and Tambler, General Santos
- Opened: July 6, 1996; 30 years ago
- Elevation AMSL: 154 m (505 ft)
- Coordinates: 06°03′28″N 125°05′45″E

Maps
- Location within Mindanao mainland Location within Philippines

Runways
Direction	Length		Surface
Direction	m	ft	Surface
17/35	3,227	10,587	Concrete

Statistics (2022)
- Passengers: 768,749 ▲334.32%
- Aircraft movements: 4,256 ▲59.10%
- Cargo (in kg): 21,063,125 ▲17.21%
- Source: CAAP

General Santos International Airport (IATA: GES, ICAO: RPMR), also known as Tambler Airport and General Santos City Airport, is an alternate international airport located in the city of General Santos, Philippines serving the greater area of Soccsksargen. Situated in Fatima, General Santos, it is a large airport on the island of Mindanao and is officially classified as an international airport by the Civil Aviation Authority of the Philippines (CAAP), a government bureau which is responsible for the management and operations of General Santos International Airport and all other airports in the country except regular international airports.

The airport was inaugurated on July 6, 1996, in time to serve the influx of visitors, athletes, and participants coming in from different parts of the Philippines who were taking part in the 42nd annual Palarong Pambansa (National Games) that was held in South Cotabato, Sarangani and General Santos area at that time. The new airport immediately replaced the old and smaller Buayan Airport in Barangay Buayan, which has been converted into an air station for the Philippine Air Force and renamed "Rajah Buayan Air Base". Though new, wider and much more modern, General Santos International Airport nevertheless retained its old IATA airport code (GES) from the old Buayan Airport.

== History ==
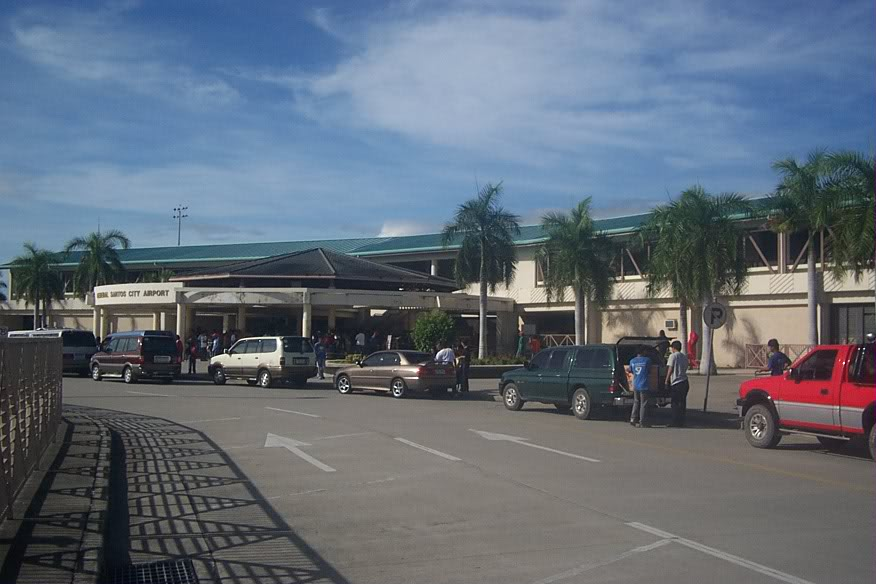
The terminal building prior to the 2017–2021 facelift

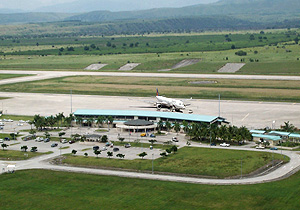
Aerial view of General Santos International Airport prior to the 2017–2021 facelift

In 1993, the airport, which, at the time, would be the largest airport in Mindanao, was built mainly on a fund granted by the United States Government amounting to US$47.6 million through its United States Agency for International Development (USAID). The Philippine Government, through the Department of Transportation and Communication (DOTC), has co-shared 25% of the total project cost of the airport. It is strategically situated on a 5,994,577-square-meter (599.4577 hectares) plot of high-altitude, government-owned and formerly leased pasture land in Barangay Fatima approximately 14 kilometers (8.7 mi) away from the central business district of General Santos. It was rumored that the construction of the airport was part of a forward strategy of the US Military forces in the Philippine Islands in an, accordingly, apparent attempt to reestablish their presence in Southeast Asia. This allegation came out a few years later after the Americans' eviction from their installations at Subic Naval Base, Olongapo, and Clark Air Base, Pampanga in 1992. Both the U.S. and the Philippine governments denied the allegation.

Upon the opening of the new airport in 1996, it has since gotten hold of the record as the biggest airport facility in the island of Mindanao, which has then become an addition to the potential of the city in its bid to become a "Boom Town", or rapidly developing urban center, as it was indeed dubbed as is during the time. All flights, in small aircraft, to and from Iloilo and Cebu cities by the national flag carrier Philippine Airlines (PAL) that were previously operating in Buayan Airport have since then landed and departed in this new and airport facility. On the first few weeks of operation of the new airport, PAL has initially deployed its Boeing 737-300 aircraft to serve its special direct flights to and from the capital to serve the travel needs for the ongoing Palarong Pambansa sports event being held during the time. As before there were no direct flights going to and from the capital of Manila to General Santos as PAL could not utilize its wider body and long range aircraft to safely land and take off in the city's old and smaller Buayan Airport. At that time there were only two options for air travelers to get to Manila from General Santos and vice versa. One was to fly to Mactan–Cebu International Airport and wait for a connecting flight to Manila upon arrival in Cebu, or secondly, make a tiresome and lengthy 4-hour overland journey to Francisco Bangoy International Airport in Davao City to catch a direct flight to Manila and vice versa.

Philippine Airlines commenced regular thrice weekly direct flights to and from Manila using a bigger and wider Airbus A300B4 aircraft. Later, this became five times weekly in November 1996. And four months after its launch, a daily service was in effect in December 1997 while maintaining its existing regular frequencies to and from Iloilo and Cebu cities using smaller Fokker 50 aircraft. The airline's initiative to commence a direct flight to and from the capital has helped pave the way to continually increase not only the air passenger traffic coming in and out of city's own airport, but also air cargo traffic, which is indicative of the city's vibrant tuna export industry and fast growing economy in general. However, PAL's financial difficulties in the late 90s forced the halting of its Iloilo and Cebu routes out of General Santos International Airport in 1998, leaving PAL with only its single daily frequency to and from Manila to operate in the airport. In 1997, Air Philippines (now PAL Express) commenced its daily Manila–General Santos–Manila flight using Boeing 737-200 and McDonnell Douglas MD-88 aircraft.

The first international chartered flight to land in General Santos International Airport was of former President Fidel V. Ramos' homecoming from one of his state visits abroad in the mid-1990s. Aboard PAL's Airbus A340 aircraft, the president and his party landed in General Santos International Airport directly from Bangkok, Thailand. In November 2003, international flights to and from Manado, Indonesia were also briefly operational on a regular weekly frequency to this city by an Indonesian carrier Merpati Nusantara Airlines using Fokker 70 aircraft. PAL has also disclosed plans of commencing international flights to and from General Santos in the late 1990s.

Cebu Pacific, the Philippines' largest low-cost carrier, commenced daily flights to and from Manila on October 2, 2006. Initially served by Airbus A319 aircraft, it has since been upgraded to the A320, A321, and A330 aircraft.

With the 48-hour shutdown of Francisco Bangoy International Airport in Davao City on June 2–3, 2013 due to an accident involving a Cebu Pacific aircraft from Manila, General Santos International Airport handled most of the diverted flights from Davao for the stranded passengers going to and coming from Manila, Cebu, Zamboanga and Kalibo cities.

Bigger aircraft such as the Boeing 777 come to the airport due to tuna cargo and increase of passengers.

Plans to rehabilitate and expand the airport were laid in 2015. The passenger terminal building prior to the facelift has not undergone any repairs. Upgrading works began in 2017 and were slated to be completed by 2019. After a few delays, the new airport facilities were inaugurated on September 23, 2021.

The airport plans to open international routes to Australia and the United Kingdom.

== Airport facilities and structures ==
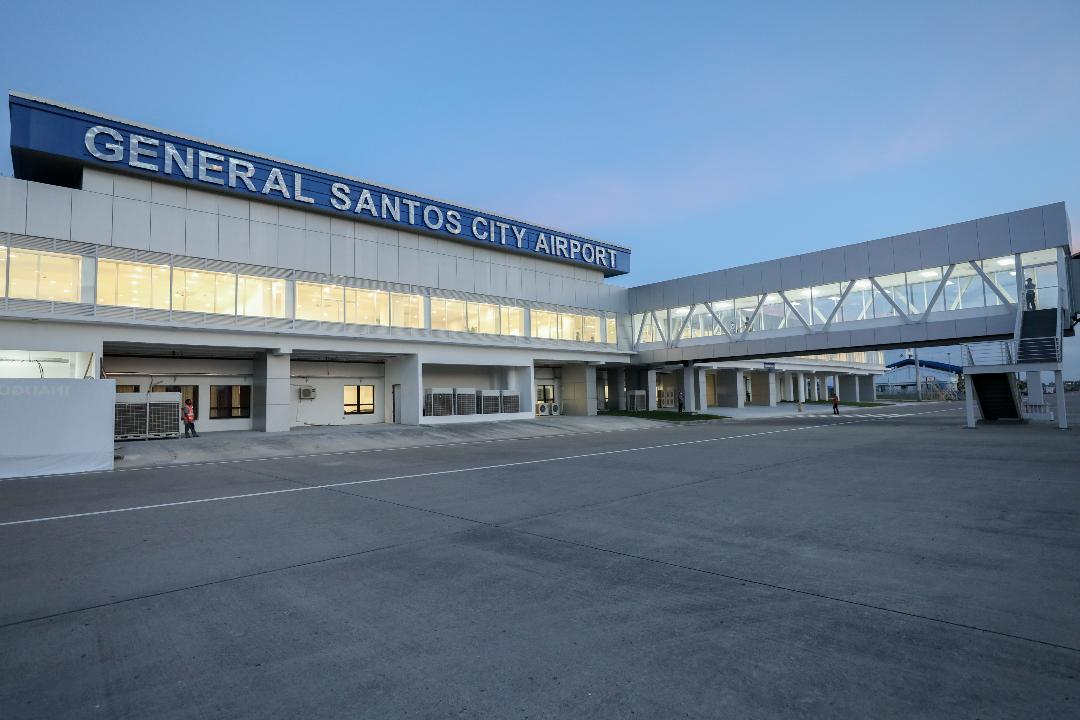
The newly expanded airport in November 2021

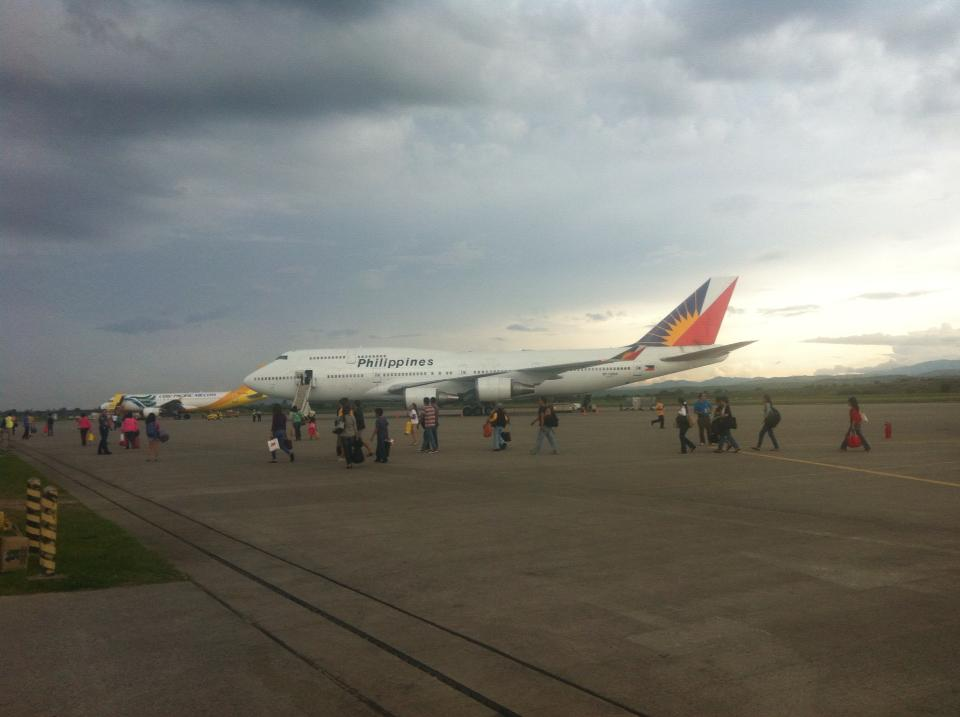
Passengers are seen walking at the ramp of General Santos International Airport, with a Philippine Airlines Boeing 747-400 and a Cebu Pacific Airbus A320-200 in the background.

=== Runway ===
General Santos International Airport has a single 3,227-meter (10,587 ft) runway with a width of 45 meters (148 ft), designated as runway 17/35. Made entirely of reinforced concrete and macadam, the airport's runway is the third-longest runway in the Philippines, after Runway 06/24 of Ninoy Aquino International Airport (3,737 meters, 12,260 ft) and Runway 04/22 of Mactan–Cebu International Airport (3,300 meters, 10,800 ft) respectively and is capable of handling the Airbus A380. It is the first airport in Mindanao to have accommodated the landing and take off of Boeing 747 aircraft.

=== Terminal ===
The facade design of the airport is patterned after the fins of the yellow-fin tuna. The consideration of the existing second floor of the terminal building which is ideal for the terminal building to expand vertically and for the boarding bridges. Philippine Airlines operates a Mabuhay Lounge intended for its business class passengers.

Prior to the 2017–2021 facelift, the terminal had an area of 4,029 square meters (43,370 sq ft) and an annual capacity of 800,000 passengers. It was expanded to the current area of 12,240 square meters (131,800 sq ft) and increased its capacity to two million passengers per year. Jet bridges were also added during the said upgrade.

Its apron can handle seven aircraft at any time.

== Access and transportation ==
General Santos International Airport is approximately 14 kilometers (8.7 mi) away from the central business district of General Santos. A concrete 6-kilometer (3.7 mi) Philippine-American Friendship Road and the 30-kilometer General Santos Diversion Road connects the airport to the Pan Philippine Highway leading to the city proper as well as to the nearby provinces.

== Airlines and destinations ==
Airlines	Destinations
Cebu Pacific	Cebu, Iloilo, Manila
PAL Express	Cebu, Manila,
Philippine Airlines	Manila,

== Statistics ==
Data from Civil Aviation Authority of the Philippines (CAAP). No data for international passenger and cargo movements were provided by CAAP.

Year	Passenger movements		Aircraft movements				Cargo movements (in kg)	
Year	Domestic	% change	Domestic	International	Total	% change	Domestic	% change
2001	148,204	Steady	1,356	–	1,356	Steady	6,713,182	Steady
2002	129,945	▲12.32	1,224	–	1,224	▼9.73	6,467,262	▼3.66
2003	186,870	▲30.46	1,748	6	1,754	▲43.30	9,678,766	▲49.66
2004	151,048	▲19.17	1,476	4	1,480	▼15.62	7,077,484	▼26.88
2005	181,306	▲16.69	1,644	–	1,644	▲11.08	8,879,390	▲25.46
2006	208,367	▲12.99	1,826	–	1,826	▲11.07	10,387,561	▲16.99
2007	310,233	▲32.84	2,326	–	2,326	▲27.38	10,005,987	▼3.67
2008	302,887	▼2.37	2,348	–	2,348	▲0.95	8,943,108	▼10.62
2009	404,859	▲25.19	1,898	–	1,898	▼19.17	9,522,908	▲6.48
2010	477,535	▲15.22	2,858	–	2,858	▲50.58	11,917,366	▲25.14
2011	492,572	▲3.05	3,240	–	3,240	▲13.37	10,883,799	▼8.67
2012	611,274	▲19.42	4,800	–	4,800	▲48.15	14,496,838	▲33.20
2013	688,673	▲11.24	5,660	–	5,660	▲17.92	16,384,066	▲13.02
2014	714,523	▲3.62	4,494	–	4,494	▼20.60	18,567,263	▲13.33
2015	592,911	▼17.10	5,286	–	5,286	▲17.62	21,741,310	▲17.09
2016	838,941	▲29.40	5,524	–	5,524	▲4.50	22,806,132	▲4.90
2017	816,037	▼2.73	6,092	–	6,092	▲10.28	22,484,123	▼1.41
2018	920,670	▲12.82	6,540	–	6,540	▲7.35	22,511,700	▲0.12
2019	1,049,842	▲14.03	6,886	–	6,886	▲5.29	22,999,261	▲2.17
2020	243,754	▼76.78	3,696	–	3,696	▼46.33	18,128,930	▼21.18
2021	177,001	▼27.39	2,675	–	2,675	▼27.62	17,969,941	▼0.88
2022	768,749	▲334.32	4,256	–	4,256	▲59.10	21,063,125	▲17.21

== See also ==
- List of airports in the Philippines
