= Camiguin (disambiguation) =

Camiguin is an island province in Mindanao, Philippines.

Camiguin may also refer to:

- Camiguin de Babuyanes in the Babuyan Islands, Luzon
- Camiguin Airport, Mindanao
