= 2021 Philippine Air Force C-130 crash =

Aircraft crash in Sulu, Philippines

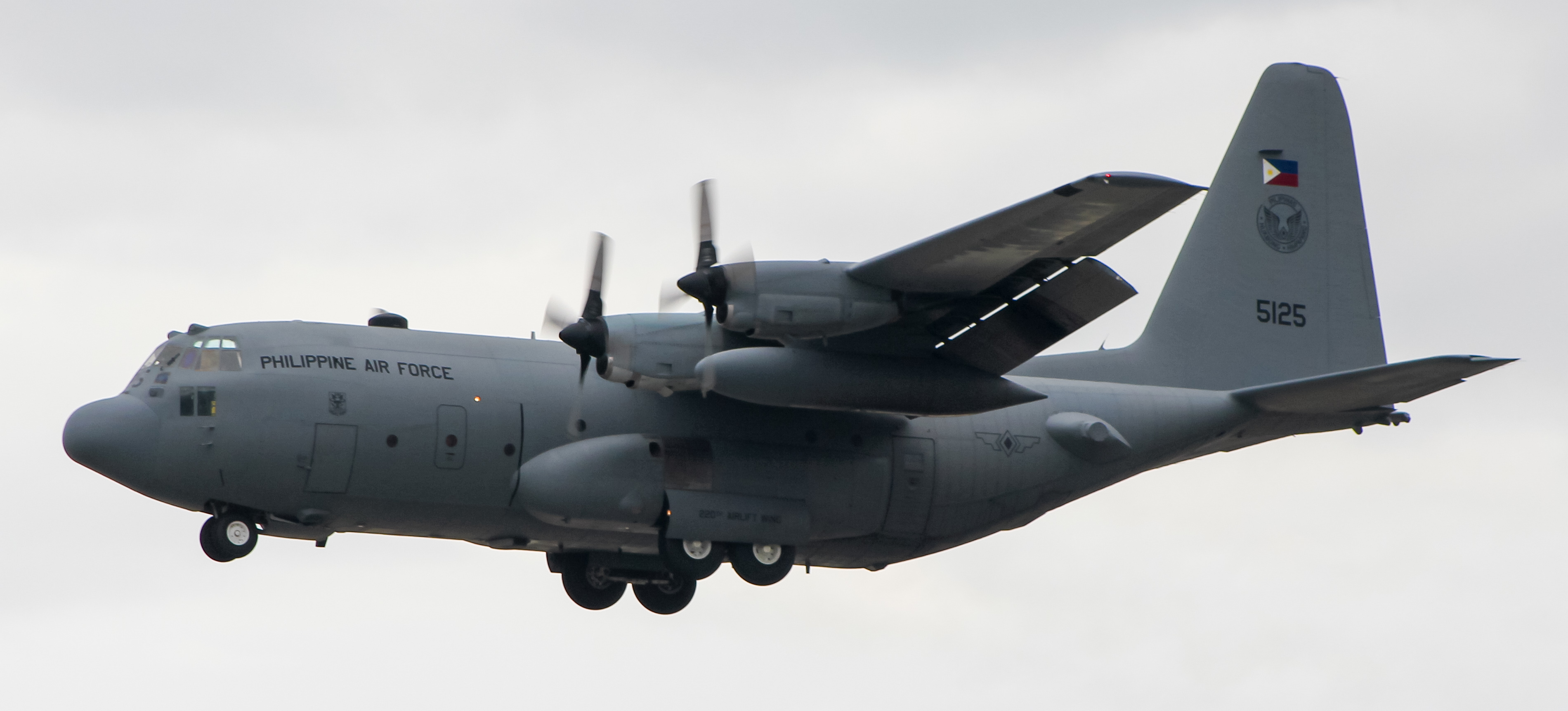
- 5125, the Philippine Air Force C-130H involved in the accident, photographed in March 2021

Accident
- Date: July 4, 2021
- Summary: Failed go-around attempt, resulting in loss of control; under investigation
- Site: Patikul, near Jolo Airport, Sulu, Philippines; 06°03′09″N 121°01′39″E

Aircraft
- Aircraft type: Lockheed C-130H Hercules
- Operator: Philippine Air Force
- Registration: 5125
- Flight origin: Villamor Air Base, Pasay, Philippines
- Stopover: Lumbia Airfield, Cagayan de Oro, Philippines
- Destination: Jolo Airport, Sulu, Philippines
- Occupants: 104
- Passengers: 96
- Crew: 8
- Fatalities: 50
- Injuries: 46
- Survivors: 54

Ground casualties
- Ground fatalities: 3
- Ground injuries: 4

On July 4, 2021, a Lockheed C-130 Hercules aircraft of the Philippine Air Force (PAF) crashed after an attempted landing at Jolo Airport in Sulu, Philippines. With 53 deaths, of which 50 people were on the aircraft and 3 on the ground, the incident is the deadliest aviation accident in Philippine military history, the fourth deadliest on Philippine soil, and the second deadliest to occur in 2021, behind Sriwijaya Air Flight 182.

== Background ==
=== Aircraft ===
The aircraft involved in the incident is a Lockheed C-130H Hercules operated by the Philippine Air Force (PAF) with the tail number 5125. A former United States Air Force aircraft in service since February 1988, it was acquired by the PAF through a grant by the United States government's Defense Security Cooperation Agency in January 2021. The Philippine military has maintained that the aircraft was in good condition and had 11,000 flying hours left before its next maintenance was due. The PAF has three other C-130s in its inventory prior to the crash; two C-130s undergoing maintenance and repair in Portugal and one C-130 operational.

=== Passengers and crew ===
At the time of the crash, there were 104 military personnel on board; including 3 pilots and 5 other aircrew. 50 of the personnel came from the Philippine Army's 4th Infantry Division training unit of Malaybalay, Bukidnon. Five military vehicles were also on board. The soldiers on board were meant to augment the Jolo-based 11th Infantry Division which is after the Abu Sayyaf group operating in the area.

== Accident ==
On July 4, 2021, the aircraft took off from Villamor Air Base in Pasay and headed to Lumbia Airfield in Cagayan de Oro. From Cagayan de Oro, the aircraft transported personnel to Jolo, Sulu. At 11:30 a.m. Philippine Time (UTC+08:00), the plane crashed after attempting to land at Jolo Airport. The aircraft overshot the runway, crashed in the nearby municipality of Patikul, and caught fire.

Fifty military personnel on board, including the pilot in command, and 3 civilians on the ground died, while 46 occupants on board and 4 civilians on the ground were injured. The 3 civilian deaths involved quarry workers. The crash is the Philippine Air Force's deadliest aviation accident in history, surpassing the 1971 Douglas C-47 Skytrain crash in Floridablanca, Pampanga which killed 40 people.

== Response ==
The Joint Task Force Sulu (JTF Sulu) of the Philippine military conducted a search and rescue operation to retrieve the bodies of the dead and assist survivors. Tausug civilians as well as members of the Citizens Armed Forces Geographical Unit (CAFGU) militia also reportedly helped extract survivors of the burning crash site. The Armed Forces of the Philippines (AFP), the Philippine National Police's Police Regional Office Bangsamoro Autonomous Region (PRO BAR), and the Sulu provincial government promised assistance to the military and affected civilians on the ground. The United States sent an emergency medical services unit to provide support to the survivors of the crash.

Most people who died from the crash were burned beyond recognition and their identities had to be determined through various means including DNA testing and relying on surviving clothing and accessories and body marks.

On July 5, President Rodrigo Duterte travelled to the Western Mindanao Command of the AFP in Zamboanga City to pay his respects to the families of the military personnel who were killed in the crash. The AFP also declared a six-day mourning period, ordering that all flags in camps and military installation across the country be flown at half-mast. Several countries sent condolences to the Philippines following the crash.

Due to the crash, the first air-to-air bilateral training of the Japan Air Self-Defense Force (JSDF) and the Philippine Air Force at the Clark Air Base in Pampanga was modified. In-flight training was cancelled with the exercise focusing on on-ground training; including load or offload training and simulated emergency procedure which involved a lone C-130 of the JSDF.

The modernization program has also been a subject of discussion in the Congress of the Philippines, both in the House of Representatives and the Senate. The policy of acquiring second-hand military assets through foreign loans was also questioned.

The crash was captured on camera, and a video of the incident later circulated on social media.

== Investigation ==
The Department of National Defense and the military has urged the public to refrain from spreading "highly speculative statements" about the incident and assured that an investigation on the crash is already being done.

The military has ruled out the possibility that the crash was caused by an attack against the aircraft. Among the angles being considered are the condition of the aircraft, the runway, if there was a human error, and if the plane was overloaded. An investigating team from the AFP arrived at the crash site on July 5. The aircraft's flight recorder and voice cockpit recorder were both recovered. Both were sent to the United States so that the recorded data from the devices could be retrieved.

The military disclosed to the public in September 2021 that there is no single attributable cause for the crash in Sulu. The report said that the accident was "most probably due to actual or perceived material factors and induced human factors which were aggravated by local and environmental conditions.” It added that the “aircraft component, environmental condition and aircrew response led to unrecoverable stall in a critical phase of the aircraft operation".

== Aftermath ==
The AFP resumed flying its C-130s on December 11, 2021.

== See also ==
- Air Philippines Flight 541 – the deadliest air disaster in the Philippines
- List of accidents and incidents involving Philippine Air Force aircraft
