= Philippine Airlines Flight 116 =

1976 aircraft hijacking

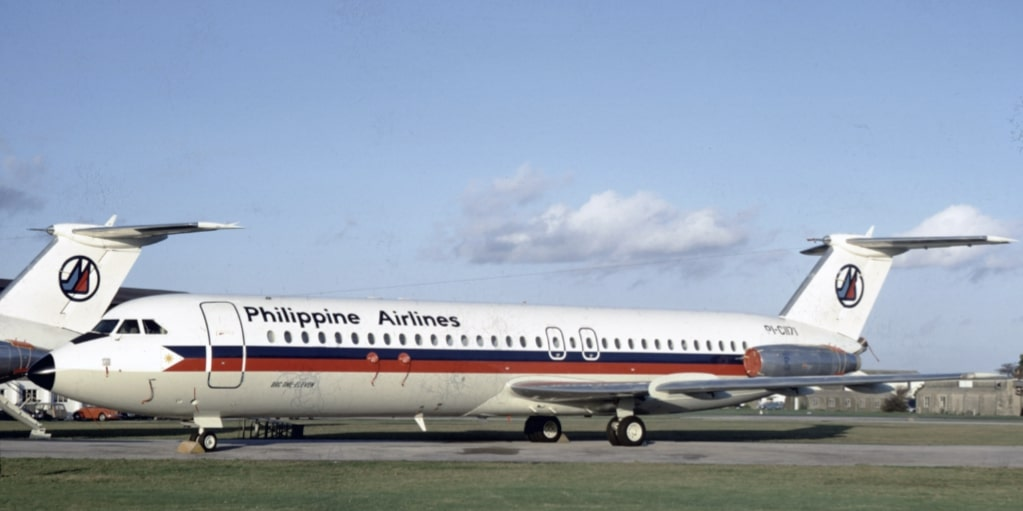
- A Philippine Airlines BAC 1-11, similar to the one involved

Accident
- Date: May 23, 1976
- Summary: Hijacking
- Site: Zamboanga International Airport, Zamboanga City, Philippines

Aircraft
- Aircraft type: BAC One-Eleven-527FK
- Operator: Philippine Airlines
- Registration: RP-C1161
- Flight origin: Francisco Bangoy International Airport, Davao City, Philippines
- Destination: Manila International Airport, Pasay, Philippines
- Passengers: 82
- Crew: 5
- Fatalities: 13
- Injuries: 23
- Survivors: 74

Philippine Airlines Flight 116 was a domestic flight operated by Philippine Airlines that departed from Francisco Bangoy International Airport in Davao to Manila International Airport. On May 21, 1976, six passengers stormed the plane and diverted it to Zamboanga Airport where it was met by the military and the police. Negotiations between the hijackers and the police continued until May 23, 1976, when authorities attempted to storm the plane. A gun battle broke out and grenades were thrown, setting it on fire. 10 passengers and 3 of the 6 hijackers died in the storming.

== Aircraft ==
The aircraft was a BAC One-Eleven Series 500 manufactured in Hurn and initially given test registration serial G-AYOS. Its first flight was in 1970, and it was delivered to Philippine Airlines in 1971 as PI-C1161. In 1974, it was re-registered to RP-C1161.

== Hijacking ==
On May 21, 1976, the BAC One-Eleven operating as Flight 116 took off from Davao City to Manila International Airport at 2:30 p.m. (local time) when six armed passengers from Makati and the Moro Liberation Front announced that they would be hijacking the plane, only 10 minutes after departure. Three hijackers were armed with grenades, while two were armed with a .45 caliber pistol, and one with a .22 caliber.

The hijackers ordered the pilots to fly to Libya, wanting to seek asylum there imitating a successful PAL that took place in April that same year.

However, the captain negotiated with the leader (known as Commander Zapata) stating that the aircraft was unfit for flying long distances because of fuel, so Zapata ordered him to fly to Sabah. With the same explanation, he reluctantly ordered the aircraft to divert to Zamboanga.

Upon landing in Zamboanga at around 3:00 p.m., the aircraft was immediately met with two armored cars parked towards the front of the jet.

The hijackers demanded a ransom of $375,000 and a larger plane to fly them to Libya, threatening to blow up the jet if their demands were not met by the Philippine government and the airline. Negotiations lasted for a day while the police and military monitored the situation. At one point, there were plans that authorities would enter the plane disguised as the relatives of the hostages. The next day, 5 women and 9 children were released in exchange for food and water, however none of the passengers were said to have been served anything until May 23.

=== Shootout ===
The Armed Forces of the Philippines deployed units from Philippine National Police Aviation Security Group and the Philippine Constabulary to settle the situation. The operation was led by General Mariano E. Castaneda Jr. A few military vehicles were on standby, including two Cadillac Gage Commandos.

The two V150 AFVs formerly parked in front of the aircraft were now pushed against the cockpit and other vital areas. However, one of them rammed the jet, causing the hijackers to panic and set off their grenades in the cabin.

A gun battle ensued for hours as the task force stormed the plane. Grenades exploded in the cabin, setting the plane on fire. Three hijackers and ten passengers were killed during the shooting, while another 23 were injured, most of them during the evacuation. The three surviving hijackers were soon arrested and executed by a firing squad.

The aircraft was written off as a result of the damage sustained. The incident was the Armed Forces of the Philippines' first anti-hijacking operation.

== Aftermath ==
A former passenger filed a lawsuit against Philippine Airlines in 1990 - the case was then dismissed.
