= Bagabag, Nueva Vizcaya =

Municipality in Nueva Vizcaya, Philippines

Bagabag
- Municipality
- Municipality of Bagabag
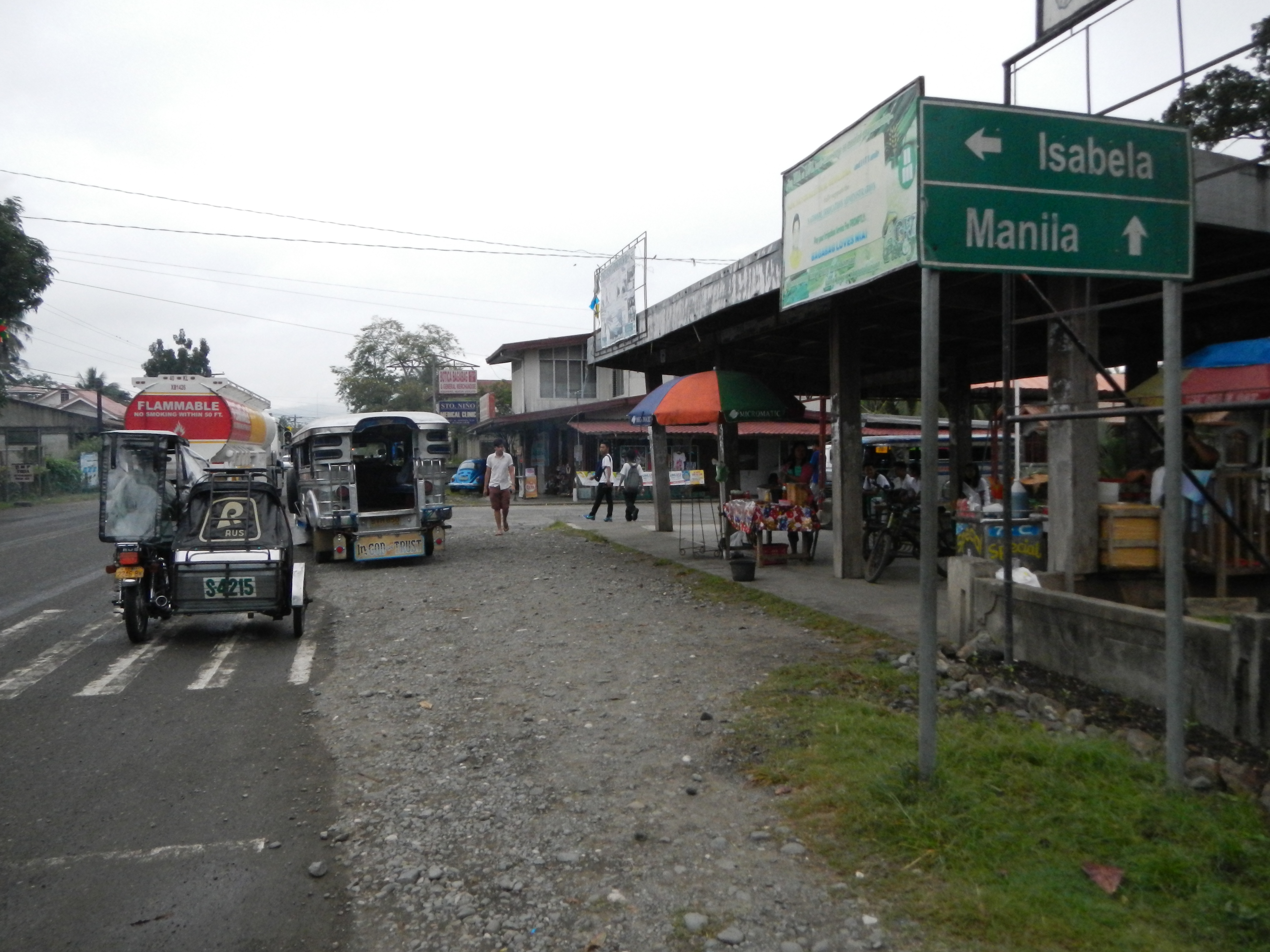
- Downtown area

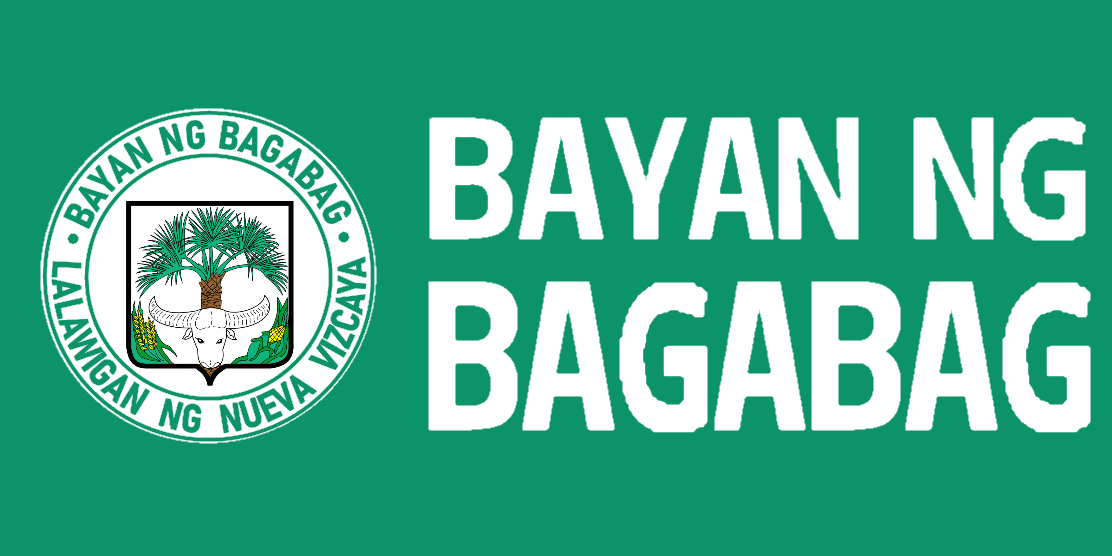
- Flag Seal
- Nickname: Buko Pie Center of the North
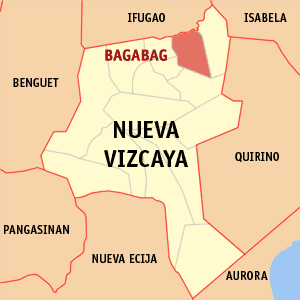
- Map of Nueva Vizcaya with Bagabag highlighted
- Interactive map of Bagabag
- Location within the Philippines
- Coordinates: 16°36′16″N 121°15′08″E
- Country: Philippines
- Region: Cagayan Valley
- Province: Nueva Vizcaya
- District: Lone district
- Founded: 1741
- Barangays: 17 (see Barangays)

Government
  - Type: Sangguniang Bayan
  - Mayor: Benigno B. Calauad
  - Vice Mayor: Johnny M. Sevillena
  - Representative: Timothy Joseph Cayton (Aksyon)
  - Electorate: 22,289 voters (2025)

Area
  - Total: 183.90 km^{2} (71.00 sq mi)
- Elevation: 269 m (883 ft)
- Highest elevation: 599 m (1,965 ft)
- Lowest elevation: 206 m (676 ft)

Population (2024 census)
  - Total: 39,138
  - Density: 212.82/km^{2} (551.21/sq mi)
  - Households: 9,603

Economy
  - Income class: 1st municipal income class
  - Poverty incidence: 5.87% (2023)
  - Revenue: ₱ 223.9 million (2024)
  - Assets: ₱ 978 million (2024)
  - Expenditure: ₱ 191.9 million (2024)
  - Liabilities: ₱ 361.8 million (2024)

Service provider
  - Electricity: Nueva Vizcaya Electric Cooperative (NUVELCO)
- Time zone: UTC+8 (PST)
- ZIP code: 3711
- PSGC: 0205003000
- IDD : area code: +63 (0)78
- Native languages: Gaddang; Ilocano; Tagalog
- Website: www.lgu-bagabag.gov.ph

Bagabag, officially the Municipality of Bagabag (Gaddang: Ili na Bagabag; Ilocano: Ili ti Bagabag; Tagalog: Bayan ng Bagabag), is a municipality in the province of Nueva Vizcaya, Philippines. According to the 2024 census, it has a population of 39,138 people.

The main crops produced are rice, corn, coconut, mango, and pineapple. Bagabag is famous for its buko pie (coconut pie) in the Cagayan Valley region and it is the gateway to the world-famous Banaue Rice Terraces. It is considered the main pineapple producer of Nueva Vizcaya.

Bagabag has the largest tilapia farming in the region. Main resources include agriculture, livestock, and fruit-bearing trees plantation. Main industries include furniture, hollow block factory, tilapia farming, buko pie, pineapple vinegar, and meat processing.

== History ==
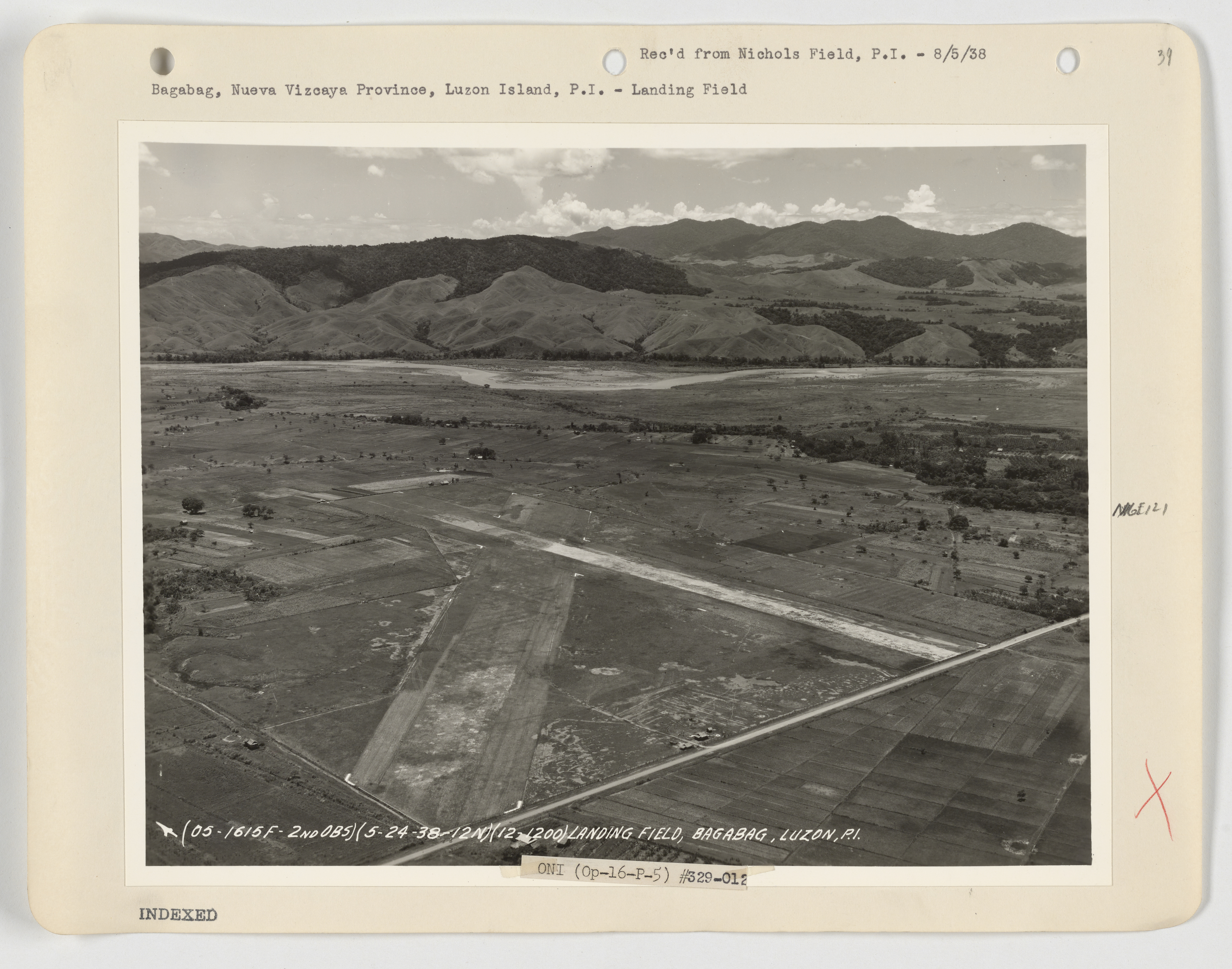
Aerial view of Bagabag landing field, 1938

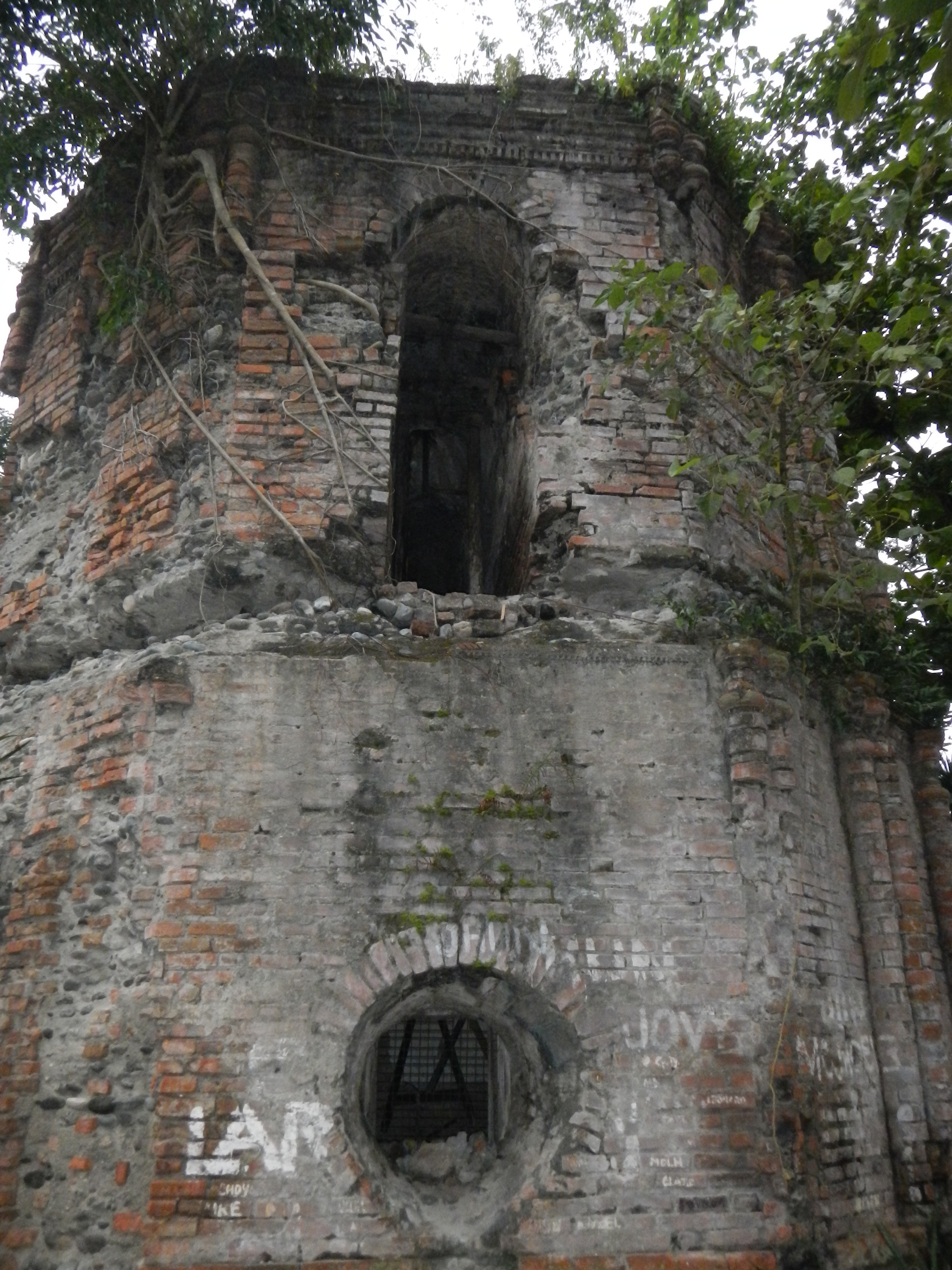
Bagabag bell tower

The natives of Bagabag are the Gaddangs whose ancestors originally came from Cagayan and Isabela provinces. At the coming of the Spaniards, the natives were mostly settled along the Magat River where they had small farms of vegetables and root crops as well as rice fields. Most of them, however, depended on fishing and hunting for their livelihood. The Spaniards found the Igorots along the Lanog and Lamut Rivers and in the hills, east of the Magat River, they found the Bugkalots.

The town was formed on October 7, 1741 by a Dominican friar, Antonio del Campo, at sitio "Nagcumventuan" a place now located between Pogonsino, Bagabag, and Bangar, Solano. The present name of the sitio bears proof to the fact that the Spanish priest constructed a church in the original town site.

Frs. Luis Sierra and Alejandro Vidal were among the first priests to settle in 1743. They organized the town in 1754. Due to the continuous erosion and flood from the Magat River and its increasing population, Fr. Vidal later transferred the town site to "Nassa" which is located between Barangays Lantap and Santa Lucia. The "Nassa" location was open and muddy throughout the year. Thus for the third time, Fr. Vidal transferred the town site to its present site where numerous buri palms were then growing. It was from this buri palm plant the name of Bagabag originated, the same being called by the natives as "bagbag". In 1753, the Spanish established a fortress at Bagabag to serve as a base of operations for conquering the Ifugaos and to defend the mountain pass leading to Isabela. Bagabag when it was once part of Cagayan was also home to 10,808 native families and 25 Spanish-Filipino Mestizo families, before the province was transferred to the region of Nueva Vizcaya.

During World War II, Bagabag Airport was built for the use of American soldiers. In 1945, the combined United States and the Philippine Commonwealth troops together with guerrillas attacked the Japanese Imperial forces in the Battle of Bagabag during World War II. Following the Japanese surrender in September 1945, General Tomoyuki Yamashita and his entourage, following their capitulation in Ifugao, were transported by car to Bagabag Airport, where they were transported by plane to La Union on their way to Baguio.

== Geography ==
The Municipality of Bagabag is located in the northeastern part of Nueva Vizcaya with a total land area of 260 square kilometres (26,000 ha). The Magat River, which runs parallel to the Pan-Philippine Highway (AH 26), is situated in the eastern part of the town proper. Located in the northern part of the town is Bagabag Airport, the only airport of Nueva Vizcaya, which serves the province and its surrounding area.

Bagabag is situated 20.07 kilometres (12.47 mi) from the provincial capital Bayombong, and 312.47 kilometres (194.16 mi) from the country's capital city of Manila.

=== Barangays ===
Bagabag is politically subdivided into 17 barangays. Each barangay consists of puroks and some have sitios.

- Bakir
- Baretbet
- Careb
- Lantap
- Murong
- Nangalisan
- Paniki (Paniqui)
- Pogonsino
- Quirino (Poblacion)
- San Geronimo (Poblacion)
- San Pedro (Poblacion)
- Sta. Cruz
- Sta. Lucia
- Tuao North
- Tuao South
- Villa Coloma (Poblacion)
- Villaros

=== Bordering Areas ===
- Lamut, Ifugao (north)
- Diadi (east)
- Villaverde (west)
- Quezon (south)
- Solano (southwest)

=== Climate ===
Climate data for Bagabag, Nueva Vizcaya
Month	Jan	Feb	Mar	Apr	May	Jun	Jul	Aug	Sep	Oct	Nov	Dec	Year
Mean daily maximum °C (°F)	24 (75)	26 (79)	28 (82)	31 (88)	31 (88)	31 (88)	30 (86)	30 (86)	29 (84)	28 (82)	27 (81)	24 (75)	28 (83)
Mean daily minimum °C (°F)	19 (66)	19 (66)	20 (68)	22 (72)	23 (73)	23 (73)	23 (73)	23 (73)	23 (73)	22 (72)	21 (70)	20 (68)	22 (71)
Average precipitation mm (inches)	119 (4.7)	83 (3.3)	54 (2.1)	37 (1.5)	133 (5.2)	132 (5.2)	161 (6.3)	163 (6.4)	153 (6.0)	142 (5.6)	160 (6.3)	224 (8.8)	1,561 (61.4)
Average rainy days	18.4	13.6	11.6	9.4	19.3	21.9	23.9	23.4	21.1	16.3	18.1	21.4	218.4
Source: Meteoblue

== Demographics ==
Population census of Bagabag

Year	Pop.	±% p.a.
1903	1,907	—
1918	3,730	+4.57%
1939	10,702	+5.15%
1948	10,288	−0.44%
1960	13,805	+2.48%
1970	16,327	+1.69%
1975	19,188	+3.29%
1980	20,855	+1.68%

Year	Pop.	±% p.a.
1990	26,028	+2.24%
1995	28,279	+1.57%
2000	30,652	+1.74%
2007	32,787	+0.93%
2010	35,462	+2.90%
2015	35,501	+0.02%
2020	37,985	+1.43%
2024	39,138	+0.72%

Source: Philippine Statistics Authority

The natives of Bagabag are the Ga'dangs or Gaddangs whose ancestors originally came from the Cagayan and Isabela regions. The Gaddangs predominantly live in the town proper and they speak the Gaddang language. Many Ilocanos and Tagalogs have migrated and live in Bagabag.

== Economy ==
Poverty incidence of Bagabag

Source: Philippine Statistics Authority

=== Tilapia Industry ===
On January 11, 2008, the Cagayan Bureau of Fisheries and Aquatic Resources (BFAR) stated that tilapia fish production grew and Cagayan Valley is now the Philippines' tilapia capital. Production supply grew 37.25% since 2003, with 14,000 metric tons (MT) in 2007. The recent aquaculture congress found that the growth of tilapia production was due to government interventions: provision of fast-growing species, accreditation of private hatcheries to ensure supply of quality fingerlings, establishment of demonstration farms, providing free fingerlings to newly constructed fishponds, and the dissemination of tilapia to Nueva Vizcaya (in Diadi town). Former cycling champion Lupo Alava is a multi-awarded tilapia raiser in Bagabag. Chairman Thompson Lantion of the Land Transportation Franchising and Regulatory Board, a retired two-star police general, has fishponds in La Torre, Bayombong. Also, Nueva Vizcaya Governor Luisa Lloren Cuaresma also entered into similar aquaculture endeavors in addition to tilapia production.

== Government ==
=== Local government ===
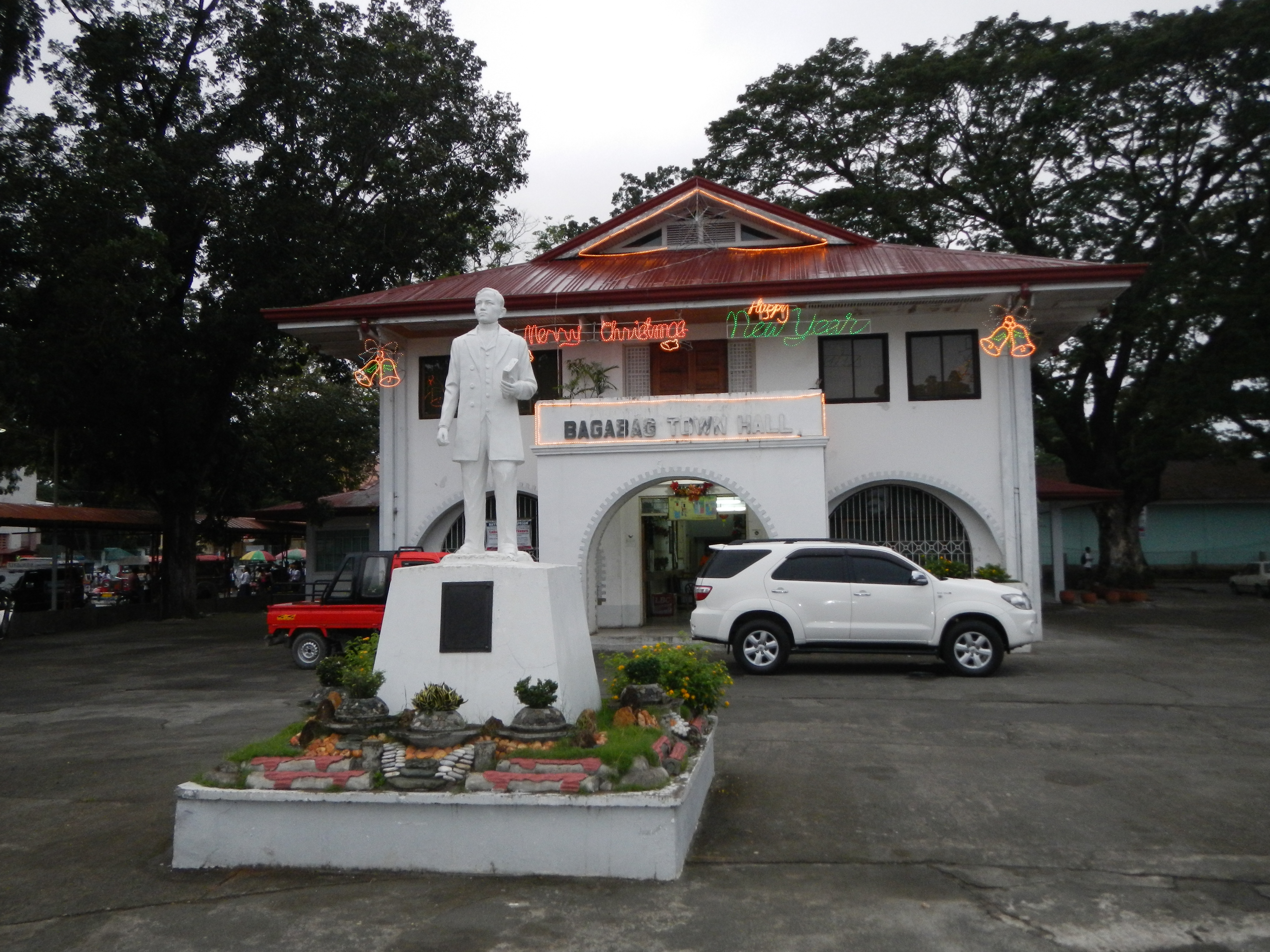
Bagabag Municipal Hall

Bagabag is part of the lone congressional district of the province of Nueva Vizcaya. It is governed by a mayor, designated as its local chief executive, and by a municipal council as its legislative body in accordance with the Local Government Code. The mayor, vice mayor, and the municipal councilors are elected directly by the people in polls held every three years.

=== Elected officials ===
Members of the Municipal Council (2022–2025)
Position	Name
Mayor	Benigno B. Calauad
Vice-Mayor	Johnny M. Sevillena
Councilors	Mario T. Afalla
Councilors	Martillano D. Dulay
Councilors	Ferdinand Douglas R. Inaldo
Councilors	Leodevico G. Jallorina
Councilors	Napoleon P. Logan
Councilors	Efren D.C. Reyes
Councilors	Byron C. Sevillena
Councilors	Elpidio A. Torio

== Education ==
The Schools Division of Nueva Vizcaya governs the town's public education system. The division office is a field office of the DepEd in Cagayan Valley region. There are two schools district offices which govern all the public and private elementary and high schools throughout the municipality.

=== Primary and elementary schools ===
- Amballo North Elementary School
- Amballo Resettlement Elementary School
- B. A. Bugayong Elementary School
- Bagabag Central School
- Bagabag Child Development Center
- Bagabag South Elementary School
- Baretbet Elementary School
- Careb Elementary School
- JP Castillo Elementary School
- Lantap Elementary School
- Lantap Kiddie Learning Center
- M. V. Duque Elementary School
- Murong Elementary School
- Murong UMC Learning Center
- Nangalisan Elementary School
- Palayan Elementary School
- Paniki Elementary School
- Pogonsino Annex Elementary School
- Pogonsino Elementary School
- Singian Elementary School
- Sta. Cruz Elementary School
- Sta. Lucia Elementary School
- Tabban Elementary School
- Tuao North Elementary School
- Tuao South Elementary School
- V. Coloma Memorial Elementary School
- Villaros Elementary School

=== Secondary schools ===
- Bagabag National High School
- Murong National High School
- Paniki High School
- St. Jerome's Academy of Bagabag
- Tuao High School

== Notable personalities ==
- Stacey Sevilleja - Member of the Pinoy pop group Bini
