= Jolo Airport =

Airport in Sulu, Philippines

Jolo Airport Lapagan sin Tiyanggi Paliparan ng Jolo
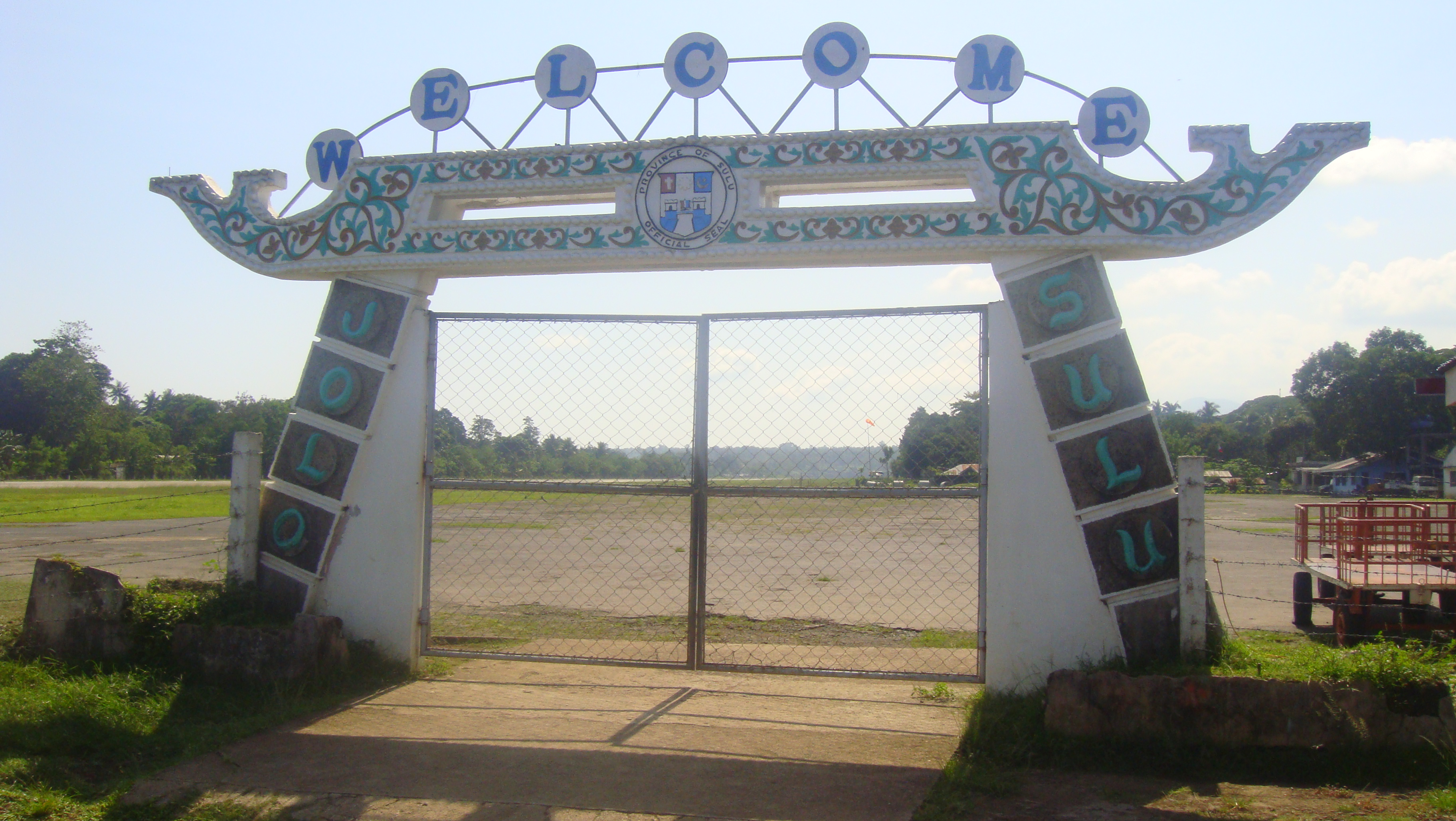
- Entrance to the apron of Jolo Airport
- IATA: JOL; ICAO: RPMJ

Summary
- Airport type: Public
- Owner/Operator: Civil Aviation Authority of the Philippines (airside and landside); Bangsamoro Airport Authority (landside)
- Serves: Sulu
- Elevation AMSL: 36 m (118 ft)
- Coordinates: 06°03′13″N 121°00′40″E

Map
- Location within Mindanao Location within Philippines

Runways
Direction	Length		Surface
Direction	m	ft	Surface
09/27	1,845	6,053	Asphalt

Statistics (2008)
- Passengers: 18,749
- Aircraft movements: 862
- Tonnes of cargo: 13
- Statistics from the Civil Aviation Authority of the Philippines.

Jolo Airport (IATA: JOL, ICAO: RPMJ) is an airport serving the general area of Jolo, located in the province of Sulu, Philippines. It is the only airport in the province of Sulu. The airport is classified as a Class 2 principal (minor domestic) airport by the Civil Aviation Authority of the Philippines.

== History ==
Jolo Airport was constructed in the 1940s during World War II as a staging point for American fighter aircraft. At the time, it had a 1,000-meter runway.

At the end of the war, the airport, then owned by the United States military, was turned over to the Sulu provincial government. The airport was expanded in 1965 by President Ferdinand Marcos, who expanded the runway to 1,200 meters. President Marcos would later expand the runway by a further 500 meters, though the runway would once more be shortened back to its 1965 length.

A three million-dollar expansion project, financed by the United States, seeks to rehabilitate the old airport by expanding the current runway to over 2,000 meters, enabling aircraft as large as the Boeing 737 to land at the airport. The rehabilitated airport should enable larger passenger planes to arrive at the new airport, facilitating trade and enabling flights not only to Manila but also to neighboring Malaysia, Indonesia and Brunei. Currently, the largest plane landing in Jolo is the C-130 Hercules.

In August 2008, a Manila-based construction company, CS Santiago Construction, won the bidding for the airport's expansion. Some P80 million has been allocated by the Philippine government for the construction of a terminal building, perimeter fencing and relocation of affected military camps and residents. The runway will be expanded to a length of 1,800 meters and a width of 60 meters, long and wide enough for larger planes to land. Construction is set to begin in October and should be completed by late 2009.

On December 14, 2009, then former President Gloria Macapagal Arroyo and ex-US Ambassador to the Philippines Kristie A. Kenny cut the ceremonial ribbon signaling the inauguration of the newly rehabilitated airport, together with Sulu Governor Abdusakur Tan, Jolo Mayor Hussin Amin On June 11, 2018, Governor Abdusakur “Toto” Tan II together with other local officials of Sulu and officials from Department of Transportation and Civil Aviation Authority of the Philippines led the formal turnover and inauguration of the newly constructed Jolo Airport Terminal Building.

== Airlines and destinations ==
Airlines	Destinations
Bangsamoro Airways	Cotabato, Zamboanga
Leading Edge	Zamboanga

== Accidents and incidents ==
- On July 4, 2021, a Philippine Air Force C-130 Hercules transport aircraft carrying military personnel, most of which were trainees from the 4th Infantry Division, crashed after attempting to land at the airport. 49 of the 96 passengers on board and 3 civilians on the ground were killed. Another 1 military officer died from injuries sustained from the crash more than a week later.

== See also ==
- List of airports in the Philippines
