= Zamboanga International Airport =

Commercial airport in Zamboanga City, Philippines

Zamboanga International Airport Aeropuerto Internacional de Zamboanga Paliparang Pandaigdig ng Zamboanga
- IATA: ZAM; ICAO: RPMZ; WMO: 98836

Summary
- Airport type: Public / Military
- Owner/Operator: Civil Aviation Authority of the Philippines
- Serves: Zamboanga City
- Location: Barangay Canelar, Zamboanga City
- Opened: March 15, 1945; 81 years ago
- Focus city for: PAL Express
- Elevation AMSL: 10 m (33 ft)
- Coordinates: 06°55′20″N 122°03′35″E

Map
- Location within Mindanao mainland Location within Philippines

Runways
Direction	Length		Surface
Direction	m	ft	Surface
09/27	2,609	8,560	Asphalt concrete

Statistics (2023)
- Passengers: 1,079,347 ▲14.3%
- Aircraft movements: 6,833 ▼8.2%
- Cargo (in kg): 9,700,000 ▲43.4%
- Source: CAAP

Zamboanga International Airport (Filipino: Paliparang Pandaigdig ng Zamboanga, Spanish/Chavacano: Aeropuerto Internacional de Zamboanga) (IATA: ZAM, ICAO: RPMZ) is the main airport serving Zamboanga City in the Philippines. Located on a 270-hectare (670-acre) site in Barangay Canelar, Zamboanga City, the airport is Mindanao's third-busiest airport after Francisco Bangoy International Airport in Davao City and Laguindingan Airport in Laguindingan, Misamis Oriental.

Despite being billed as an international airport, the airport is officially classified as a Class 1 principal domestic airport by the Civil Aviation Authority of the Philippines.

== History ==
The airport started off as Moret Field, an American airfield that was constructed to replace a Japanese airfield just north of Zamboanga. Construction was started by Philippine Commonwealth troops just after American forces landed at the present location on March 15, 1945. It was improved by a U.S. Army airfield construction unit using considerable Filipino labor. When completed, the single runway was about 1,400 meters (4,500 ft) long aligned southwest to northeast. There were two adjacent taxiways along both sides of the runway with revetment areas. At the peak of operations in 1945, there were about 300 aircraft flying from the airfield. The vast majority were United States Marine Corps aircraft from Marine Aircraft Group 24 which were supporting U.S. Army & Philippine Army infantry operations on Mindanao but also ranging down the Sulu area as far as Borneo.

Subsequent improvements increased its capacity to hold flights. The airport used to service nearby international destinations in the past, such as Labuan and Sandakan in Malaysia via Philippine Airlines; Kota Kinabalu by Malaysia Airlines; and Tarakan in Indonesia by Bouraq Airlines; however, these international services were eventually cut.

On December 10, 2004, South Phoenix Airways announced their international flights to Sandakan and Kota Kinabalu in Malaysia, but it was eventually cut due to poor load of passengers. Likewise, Asian Spirit commenced service to Sandakan on May 2, 2007, restarting Zamboanga's international operations. The Zamboanga-Sandakan route and other international routes are expected to grow with the signing of a BIMP-EAGA open skies agreement, notably with Indonesia's Sriwijaya Air planning to fly the Zamboanga-Sandakan route.

Zamboanga International Airport, along with all other international airports in the Philippines, was placed under the control of the Manila International Airport Authority under Executive Order No. 341, signed by President Gloria Macapagal Arroyo on August 4, 2004. The changes in management were slated to take effect in June 2007.

Due to the US-RP Agreement, the US Air force used the airport while the Balikatan military exercises were held in the city. The biggest aircraft to land in Zamboanga International Airport is the Russian Antonov An-124-100 Ruslan made to deliver pickup trucks for the American training mission here in Zamboanga. North American Airlines Boeing 757-200s were chartered to transport American soldiers from Guam to Zamboanga. Boeing C-17 Globemaster IIIs flying from Okinawa come to Zamboanga every now and then. Gemini Air Cargo's DC-10 was once in Zamboanga Airport for delivery of the materials needed for the US Air Force training.

During the 2013 Zamboanga City crisis, the airport was closed to all civilian air traffic on September 9, and a no-fly zone was enforced within 40 kilometers (25 mi) of the airport. On September 19, the airport reopened to civilian flights as the security situation improved.

Due to its potential as a key-areas in the BIMP-EAGA zone, there are plans to reinstate its international routes. Cebgo initially planned to commence four weekly flights to Sandakan in October 2017. However, the flight was postponed due to operational issues. Flights to Kota Kinabalu operated by PAL Express De Havilland Canada Q400s were to begin on March 31, 2020, but did not push through as travel restrictions due to the COVID-19 pandemic were enforced. Nevertheless, the airline is still interested in launching this service as of February 2022.

On September 28, 2021, the rehabilitated and expanded passenger terminal was inaugurated.

== Future development ==
There were plans in 2007 to transfer the airport to a 104-hectare (260-acre) lot located between Barangays Talabaan and Taluksangay, about 12.75 km (7.92 mi) from Zamboanga City. The plan was suspended due to lack of funding. However, it was supported by the Philippine Chamber of Commerce and Industry with the purpose of converting the current property to a business district.

The airport project, at its current form, will be located on a 175-hectare (430-acre) area in barangays Mercedes and Talabaan, 17 kilometers (11 mi) away from the city. Surveying works begun in April 2022, while land acquisition begun on September 16. The new airport, which would cost ₱13.9 billion, would have a state-of-the-art passenger terminal building with a capacity of eight million passengers annually, six jet bridges, a control tower, and a 3,440-meter (11,290 ft) runway.

In Dalipe's First SOCA held on January 30, 2023. He announced that should the land acquisition for the new airport is completed by 2024. The construction of the New Zamboanga International Airport would commence in 2025 with a target operation date on 2030.

== Structure ==
=== Runways ===
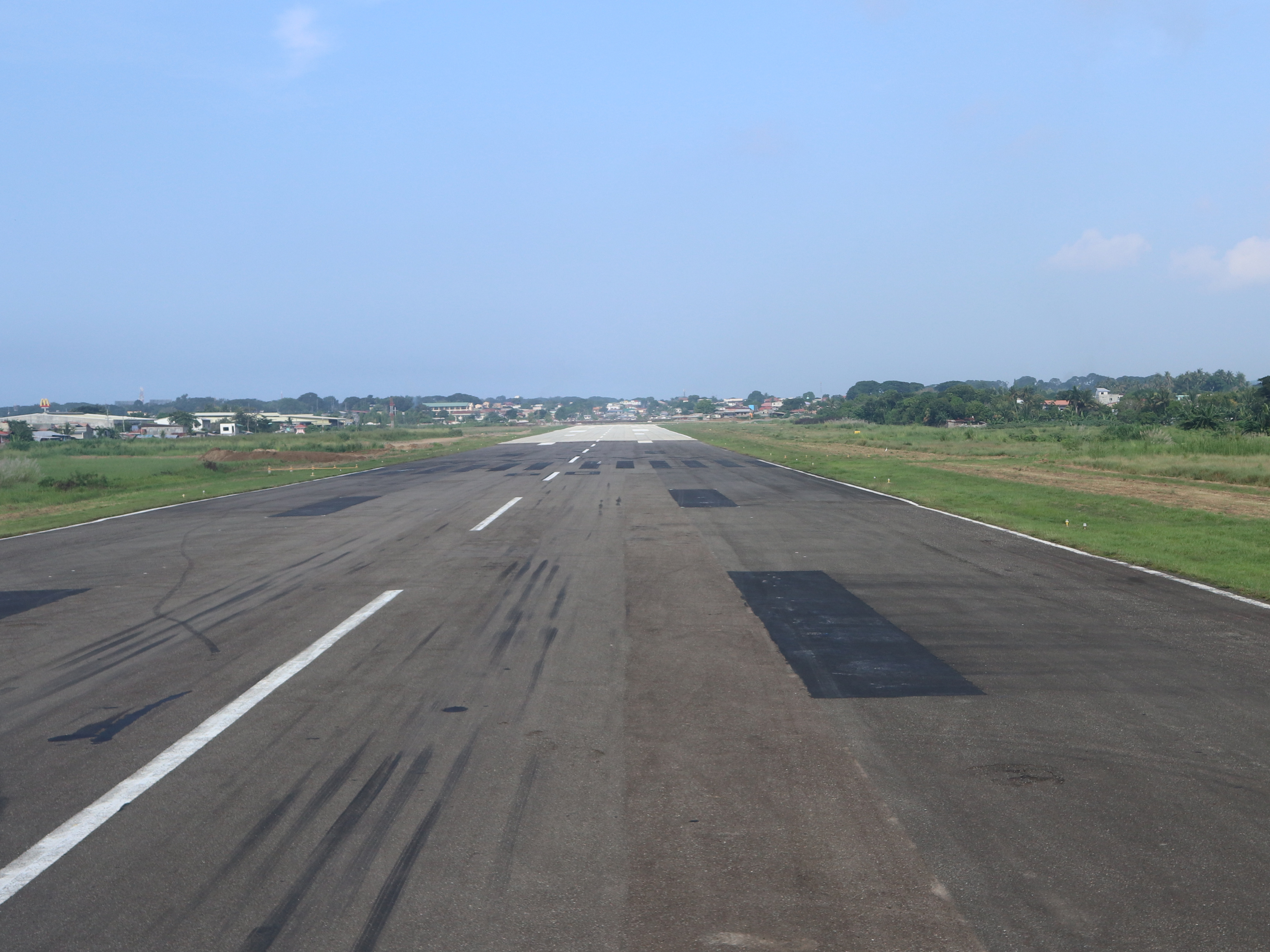
Airport runway

Zamboanga International Airport has one 2,610-meter (8,560 ft) primary runway with a width of 45 meters (148 ft), designated as Runway 09/27. It is capable of supporting the Boeing 737 and the Airbus A320. The airport also has taxiways that measure 25 meters (82 ft) in width. While the runway can support aircraft as big as the Airbus A350 and Boeing 747, the airport lacks the necessary equipment to facilitate the landing of large aircraft. There are plans to extend the runway to 3,000 meters (9,800 ft), making it capable of receiving even bigger aircraft.

The airport, like all other international airports in the Philippines, has runway lights, which make it possible to support night landings. This makes 24-hour airport operations possible.

The runway is presently being shared between the airport and the Edwin Andrews Air Base (EAAB). Military jets and aircraft land and depart on this runway. At the end of Runway 09 is the street to Barangay Sta. Maria, and a park. This can be a perfect spot to take pictures for departing and landing aircraft. At the end of the Runway 27 is San Roque St., which hosts a large public cemetery. Each end of the runway has aprons capable of supporting two Boeing 737s. One of the aprons in the end of Runway 09 is being used by the Philippine Air Force. OV-10s, C-130s, and other Air Force and military aircraft are parked there. While the apron at the end of Runway 27 is available, but need repairs.

=== Terminals ===
The airport has one 3,456-square-meter (37,200 sq ft) terminal, designed by a Mindanaoan architect with help from National Artist for architecture Leandro Locsin, and a 30,000-square-meter (320,000 sq ft) apron. The apron has two taxiways. The apron is capable of supporting four narrow-body aircraft simultaneously. There are also plans to add another apron across the old apron so that it can accommodate more aircraft at the same time.

The terminal building has a capacity of 750 passengers in its pre-departure and arrival areas. The terminal houses a metal detector and an X-ray machine, both located at the main entrance of the airport and before entering the Pre-Departure Area. The terminal also has 2 baggage carousels and push carts for passengers' baggage. The airport has check-in counters for each of the airlines that serve Zamboanga.

Zamboanga International Airport Terminal.

Terminal building view from runway

=== Other structures ===
The airport also has a modern control tower, a fire station with 2 firetrucks. There are hangars on the southwest of the terminal. The hangars are privately owned by some charter and business airlines. An old Swift Air Douglas DC-3, one of four is still on the hangar. The airport's parking area can accommodate 110 vehicles.

== Airlines and destinations ==
Airlines	Destinations
Bangsamoro Airways	Cotabato, Jolo
Cebgo	Davao
Cebu Pacific	Cebu, Manila, Tawi-Tawi
PAL Express	Cebu, Manila, Tawi-Tawi
Leading Edge	Cebu, Jolo

== Statistics ==
Data from the Civil Aviation Authority of the Philippines (CAAP).

Year	Passenger movements		Aircraft movements		Cargo movements (in kg)	
Year	Domestic	% change	Domestic	% change	Domestic	% change
2001	270,138	Steady	8,204	Steady	5,871,863	Steady
2002	295,611	▲9.42	5,557	▼32.26	6,209,752	▲5.75
2003	309,331	▲4.64	3,505	▼36.93	7,591,923	▲22.26
2004	353,051	▲14.13	3,509	▲0.11	7,561,297	▼0.40
2005	360,925	▲2.23	3,281	▼6.50	5,821,416	▼23.01
2006	396,182	▲9.77	2,739	▼16.52	5,009,257	▼13.95
2007	485,218	▲22.47	2,879	▲5.11	5,928,742	▲18.36
2008	469,540	▼3.23	3,305	▲14.80	6,060,161	▲2.22
2009	582,917	▲24.15	3,712	▲12.31	7,690,309	▲26.90
2010	623,639	▲6.99	3,805	▲2.51	8,965,227	▲16.58
2011	804,052	▲28.93	7,145	▲87.78	9,470,350	▲5.63
2012	904,668	▲12.51	17,290	▲141.99	10,801,926	▲14.06
2013	796,530	▼11.95	18,142	▲4.93	10,357,858	▼4.11
2014	901,041	▲13.12	17,522	▼3.42	12,676,538	▲22.39
2015	911,329	▲1.14	13,410	▼23.47	11,861,720	▼6.43
2016	980,476	▲7.59	9,362	▼30.19	12,334,832	▲3.99
2017	1,076,372	▲9.78	10,550	▲12.69	13,285,274	▲7.71
2018	1,214,078	▲12.79	11,870	▲12.51	13,618,163	▲2.51
2019	1,202,407	▼0.96	11,947	▲0.65	14,509,517	▲6.55
2020	310,053	▼74.21	8,704	▼27.14	5,737,951	▼60.45
2021	265,073	▼14.51	10,136	▲16.45	6,105,806	▲6.41
2022	929,985	▲250.84	7,434	▼26.66	6,836,525	▲11.97
2023	1,079,347	▲16.08	6,833	▼8.09	9,700,000	▲41.88
2024	1,179,804	▲9.31	9,236	▲35.17	10,441,973	▲7.65
2025	1,174,625	▼0.44	8,402	▼9.03	10,729,891	▲2.76

== Accidents and incidents ==
- On May 21, 1976, Philippine Airlines Flight 116 (en route between Davao City and Manila) was hijacked by six terrorists. The aircraft was forced to land at Zamboanga. On May 23, security forces tried to storm the plane and a gun battle broke out, during which some grenades were set off by the hijackers, which damaged the aircraft beyond repair. Ten passengers and three hijackers were killed. The remaining 3 hijackers were caught and sentenced to death.
- On March 2, 1987, Philippine Airlines Flight 171 from Davao damaged its engine when its landing was aborted by a herd of cows which strayed on the runway. The plane had slowed down its engine when the pilot saw the cows on the runway. The plane flew past the cows and landed safely on its second approach. All the 94 passengers of the plane were safe.
- On May 3, 2006, Cebu Pacific Flight 393, a Douglas DC-9 from Davao, was on final approach on Runway 27 at 9:15 am. After touchdown, the left main gear of the aircraft burst. All 100 passengers were safe, but the aircraft was stuck on the runway. Because of this, the airport was closed for 23 hours. Air Philippines flights to Zamboanga were canceled, as well as all Philippine Airlines afternoon flights to and from Zamboanga and Cebu Pacific flights to Manila. A South East Asian Airlines flight from Jolo that was about to land in Zamboanga was ordered to go back due to the incident. The Cebu Pacific Zamboanga station advised their Manila hub about the problem, sending two new landing gears to Zamboanga. However, since the aircraft was stuck on the runway, the plane that was going to deliver the planes gear landed at Pagadian Airport and helicopters of the Philippine Air Force delivered the landing gears to the airport. The next day, the aircraft was removed from the runway and normal airport operations resumed. Due to the incident, Philippine Airlines and Air Philippines were forced to hold special flights.
- On December 28, 2006, a Philippine Air Force assault helicopter crashed during an emergency landing Thursday on the airport's runway. The pilots of the rocket-firing MG520 helicopter, which is used against al-Qaeda-linked militants and communist guerrillas, were on a routine maintenance flight when they decided to make an emergency landing for unclear reasons. The MG530 was damaged and its two pilots were slightly injured and shaken by the crash landing.
- On August 5, 2010, a bombing incident occurred upon the arrival of Sulu Governor Abdusakur Tan, who was the main target of the terrorists, from Manila at 6:00pm. The incident killed two people and several were hurt, including Tan. This incident prompted Representative Bong Climaco to make a proposal to relocate the airport to its new site that will cost PhP 9 billion. A suspect involved in the bombing later surrendered in 2016.
- On March 9, 2011, Philippine Airlines Flight 124 bound for Manila scheduled to depart at 6:55am was turning slowly for take off when its left wheel fell off the concrete runway and got stuck in a puddle of mud. All 132 passengers safely disembarked from the aircraft and returned to the pre-departure area.

== See also ==
- List of airports in the Philippines
- Francisco Bangoy International Airport
- Edwin Andrews Air Base
