= Bagabag Airport =

Bagabag Airport Pagtayaban ti Bagabag (Ilocano) Paliparan ng Bagabag (Filipino)
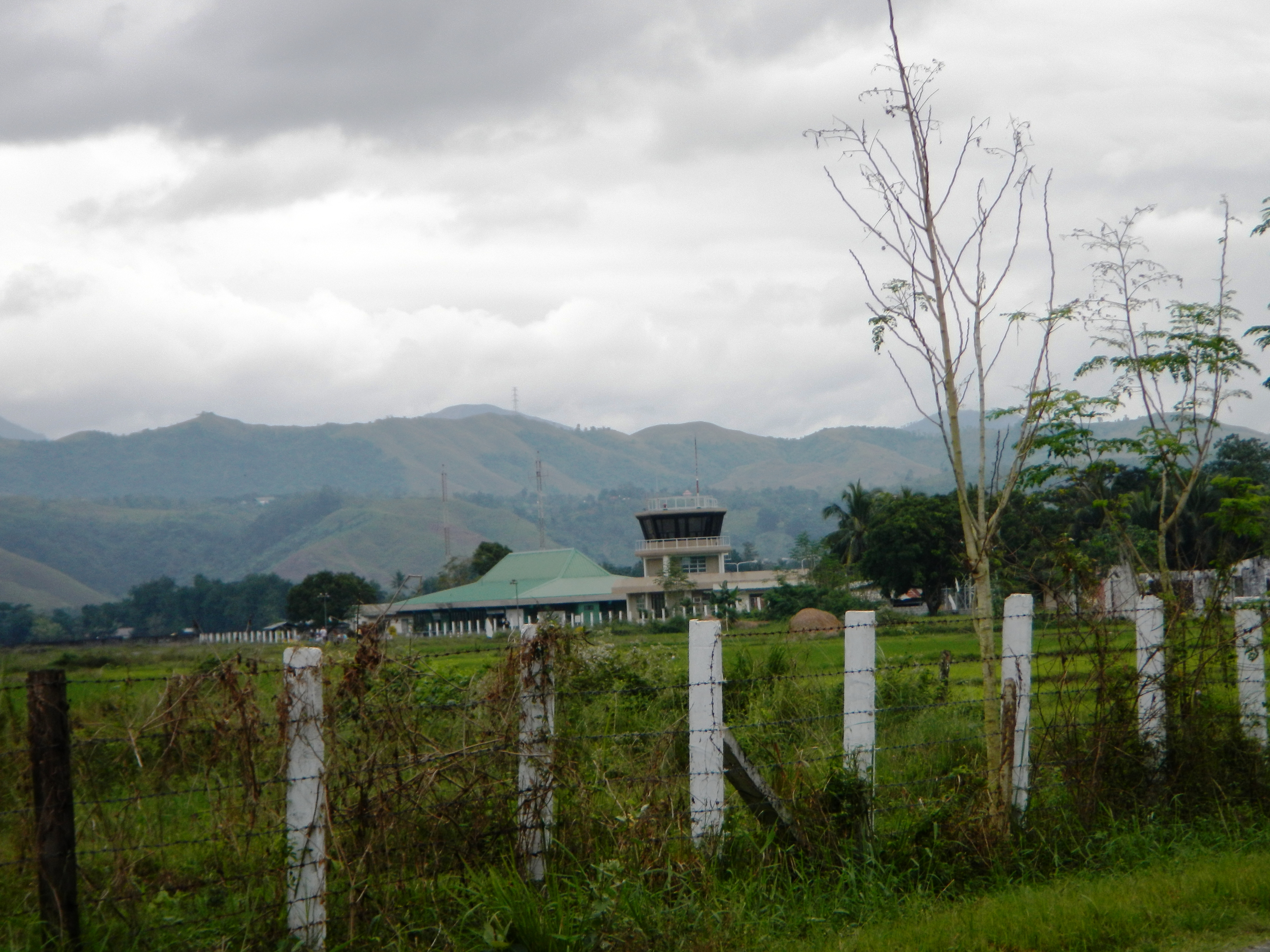
- Exterior of Bagabag Airport
- IATA: none; ICAO: RPUZ

Summary
- Airport type: Public
- Owner/Operator: Civil Aviation Authority of the Philippines
- Serves: Bagabag
- Location: Villa Coloma, Bagabag, Nueva Vizcaya
- Elevation AMSL: 250 m / 820 ft
- Coordinates: 16°37′09″N 121°15′07″E

Map
- Location in the Philippines

Runways
Direction	Length		Surface
Direction	m	ft	Surface
09/27	1,200	3,937	Concrete

Statistics
- Passengers (2016): 509
- Statistics from the Civil Aviation Authority of the Philippines.

Bagabag Airport (Ilocano: Pagtayaban ti Bagabag, Filipino: Paliparan ng Bagabag) (ICAO: RPUZ) is an airport serving the general area of Bagabag, located in the province of Nueva Vizcaya in the Philippines. It is the only airport in Nueva Vizcaya and is classified as a community airport by the Civil Aviation Authority of the Philippines, a body of the Department of Transportation that is responsible for the operations of airports in the Philippines except the major international airports.

== History ==
The airport was built during World War II for the use of American soldiers. Following the Japanese surrender in September 1945, General Tomoyuki Yamashita and his entourage, following their capitulation in Ifugao, were transported by car to the airport, where they were transported by plane to La Union on their way to Baguio. After Philippine independence, the airfield was converted into a civilian airport by president Diosdado Macapagal.

== Access ==
It is the closest public airport to the Banaue Rice Terraces at Banaue, the Rice Terraces of the Philippine Cordilleras at Banaue, Mayoyao, Hungduan and Kiangan; the tourist town of Sagada, Mountain Province; and other attractions in the province of Nueva Vizcaya such as the Bayombong Cathedral, Imugan Falls in Santa Fe, Mount Palali and the Capisaan Caves in the Caraballo Mountains and the San Vicente Ferrer Church in Dupax del Sur.

== Destinations ==
Philippine Airlines operated flights to Bagabag in the 1970s but later cancelled them. In 2000, SeaAir briefly operated charter flights to Bagabag.

Following years of only seeing limited use by mostly general aviation and military flights, the airport will once again be serviced by regular commercial flights (at a frequency of every four days) beginning 1 June 2017, with Platinum Skies using 31-seater Dornier 328 aircraft chartered by Wakay Tours to carry passengers availing of their Banaue tour packages. The 30-minute flight to Bagabag from Clark International Airport cuts down travel time to Banaue from Manila, normally a 10- to 12-hour drive, by half.
