= San Carlos City Airport =

Airport in Philippines

San Carlos City Airport Tugpahanan sa Dakbayan sa San Carlos Hulugpaan sang Dakbanwa sang San Carlos Paliparan ng Lungsod ng San Carlos
- IATA: none; ICAO: none

Summary
- Owner/Operator: City Government of San Carlos
- Serves: First District of Negros Occidental
- Coordinates: 10°30′35″N 123°26′6″E
- Interactive map of San Carlos City Airport

Runways
Direction	Length		Surface
Direction	m	ft	Surface
	1,000	3,280	Gravel

San Carlos City Airport (Filipino: Paliparan ng Lungsod ng San Carlos, Hiligaynon: Hulugpaan sang Dakbanwa sang San Carlos, Cebuano: Tugpahanan sa Dakbayan sa San Carlos), is community airport serving the general area of the city of San Carlos, Negros Occidental, and the surrounding areas in the Philippines.

== Current development ==
It is used exclusively for cargo, though there are currently no commercial flights, serving occasional chartered planes to nearby Toledo, Cebu and the resort island of Refugio (Sipaway). While serviceable, the runway and other airport facilities are still under development, with maintenance shouldered by the City Government of San Carlos.
