= Rajah Buayan Air Station =

- Part of Philippine Air Force
- General Santos, Philippines

Site information
- Type: Air Base
- Owner: Philippines
- Controlled by: Philippine Air Force
- Condition: active, as of 2014

Location
- Coordinates: 06°06′23″N 125°14′06″E

Site history
- In use: Philippines

Rajah Buayan Air Station
- IATA: none; ICAO: RPMB

Summary
- Airport type: Military
- Owner: Philippine National Government
- Operator: Philippine Air Force
- Location: General Santos, Philippines
- Elevation AMSL: 28 ft (8.5 m)
- Coordinates: 06°06′23″N 125°14′06″E

Map
- Location in the Philippines

Runways
Direction	Length		Surface
Direction	ft	m	Surface
01/19	5,577	1,700	Concrete

Rajah Buayan Air Station is a military airbase located at General Santos, Philippines. It previously served as the main airport for General Santos until the opening of General Santos International Airport in 1996.

== See also ==
- General Santos International Airport
