= Cotabato Airport =

Airport in Maguindanao del Norte, Philippines

Cotabato Airport Paliparan ng Cotabato
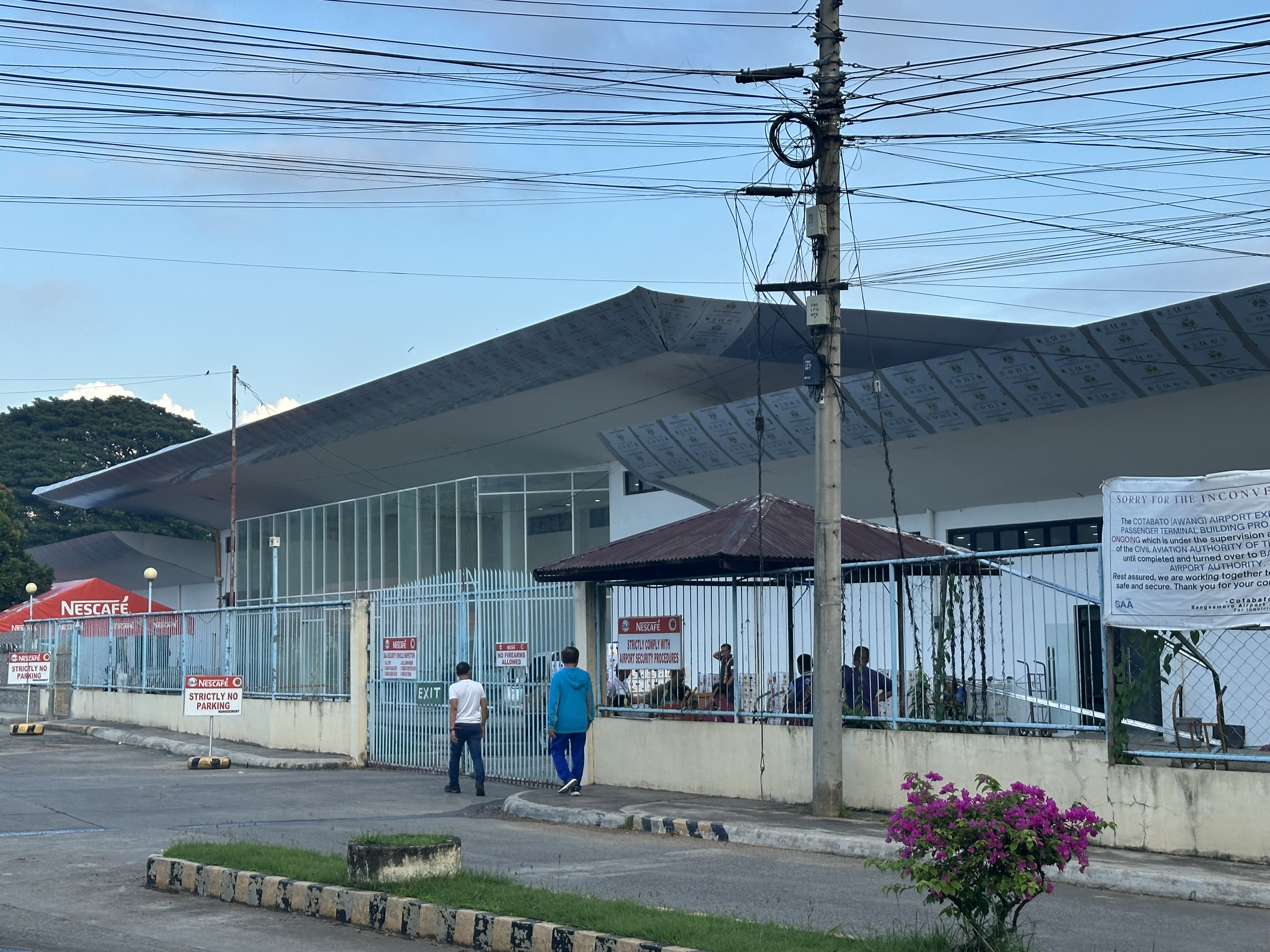
- Cotabato Airport
- IATA: CBO; ICAO: RPMC; WMO: 98746

Summary
- Airport type: Public
- Owner/Operator: Civil Aviation Authority of the Philippines (airside and landside); Bangsamoro Airport Authority (landside)
- Serves: Bangsamoro mainland
- Location: Barangay Awang, Datu Odin Sinsuat, Maguindanao del Norte, Philippines
- Operating base for: Bangsamoro Airways
- Elevation AMSL: 183 ft (56 m)
- Coordinates: 07°09′55″N 124°12′35″E

Map
- Location within Mindanao mainland Location within Philippines

Runways
Direction	Length		Surface
Direction	m	ft	Surface
10/28	1,900	6,234	Asphalt

Statistics (2022)
- Passengers: 295,801 ▲83.44%
- Aircraft movements: 2,384 ▲6.23%
- Cargo (in kg): 1,264,809 ▲8.53%
- Source: Civil Aviation Authority of the Philippines

Cotabato Airport (IATA: CBO, ICAO: RPMC), also known as Awang Airport, is an airport serving the general area of Cotabato City, North Cotabato, Maguindanao del Norte, and Maguindanao del Sur. It is located in the province of Maguindanao del Norte in the Philippines and is classified as a Class 1 principal (major domestic) airport by the Civil Aviation Authority of the Philippines.

The airport was the 21st busiest airport in the Philippines in 2021. The airport is generally used by the people of Cotabato City.

The airport was temporarily closed from June 22, 2023 until October 1, 2023 for runway repairs.

== Airlines and destinations ==
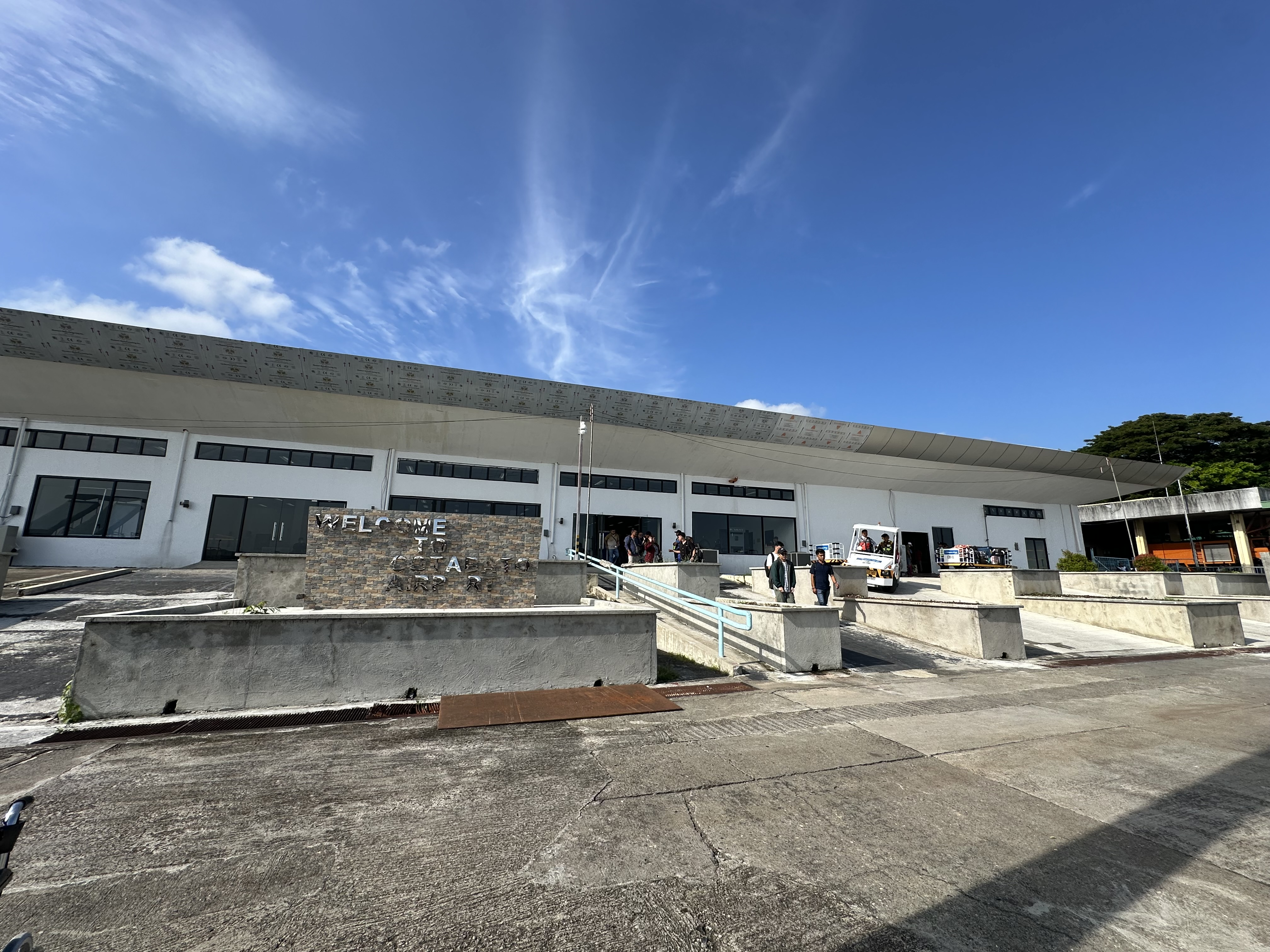
Departure Area of Cotabato Airport.

Airlines	Destinations
Bangsamoro Airways	Jolo, Zamboanga
PAL Express	Cebu, Manila, Tawi-Tawi

== Statistics ==
Data from Civil Aviation Authority of the Philippines (CAAP).

=== Passenger movements ===
Year	Domestic Passengers	Change
2003	46,409	Steady
2004	63,902	▲27.37%
2005	86,920	▲26.48%
2006	125,539	▲30.76%
2007	127,198	▲1.3%
2008	104,535	▼17.82%
2009	199,133	▲47.5%
2010	219,104	▲9.11%
2011	122,525	▼44.07%
2012	246,409	▲50.27%
2013	239,625	▼2.75%
2014	232,742	▼2.87%
2015	241,642	▲3.68%
2016	258,529	▲6.5%
2017	289,229	▲10.61%
2018	299,861	▲3.54%
2019	309,556	▲3.23%
2020	83,957 (COVID-19 pandemic)	▼368.70%
2021	161,247	▲92.05%
2022	295,801	▲83.44%

== Future plans ==
=== Potential Destinations ===
According to the recent interview with Atty. Sinarimbo in Midsayap Radio Program, they are already preparing to open flights and shipping route from Cotabato City to (Basilan, Sulu, Tawi-tawi) BASULTA. This will fasten the government services that will directly link connectivity of Bangsamoro to island Provinces. At present time cargo or passengers movement are via Zamboanga or Manila Airport and Seaport respectively. Soon this will utilize the Polloc International Seaport and Cotabato Airport capabilities.

=== Night flights and Infrastructure Upgrades ===
According to the Department of Transportation (DOTr), airports in the city of Cotabato is now undergoing rehabilitation and expansion.

The repairs include the widening of the breath of the runway and the upgrade of terminal facilities for night-flight capabilities and a better and safer experience for passengers to enjoy On 18 June 2021, runway strip grade correction work began, conducted by DOTr, Department of National Defense (DND) and the 549th Engineering Brigade of the Philippine Army. Construction work is expected to finish within 450 days.

=== International airport ===
An International Airport is proposed to be built to Barangay Tamontaka, Cotabato City, while the existing domestic airport will serve as a Military Air Base. As of now, construction is anticipated in June 2019.

== See also ==
- List of airports in the Philippines
