= Pagadian Airport =

Airport in Zamboanga del Sur, Philippines

Pagadian City Airport Tugpahanan sa Pagadian Paliparan ng Pagadian
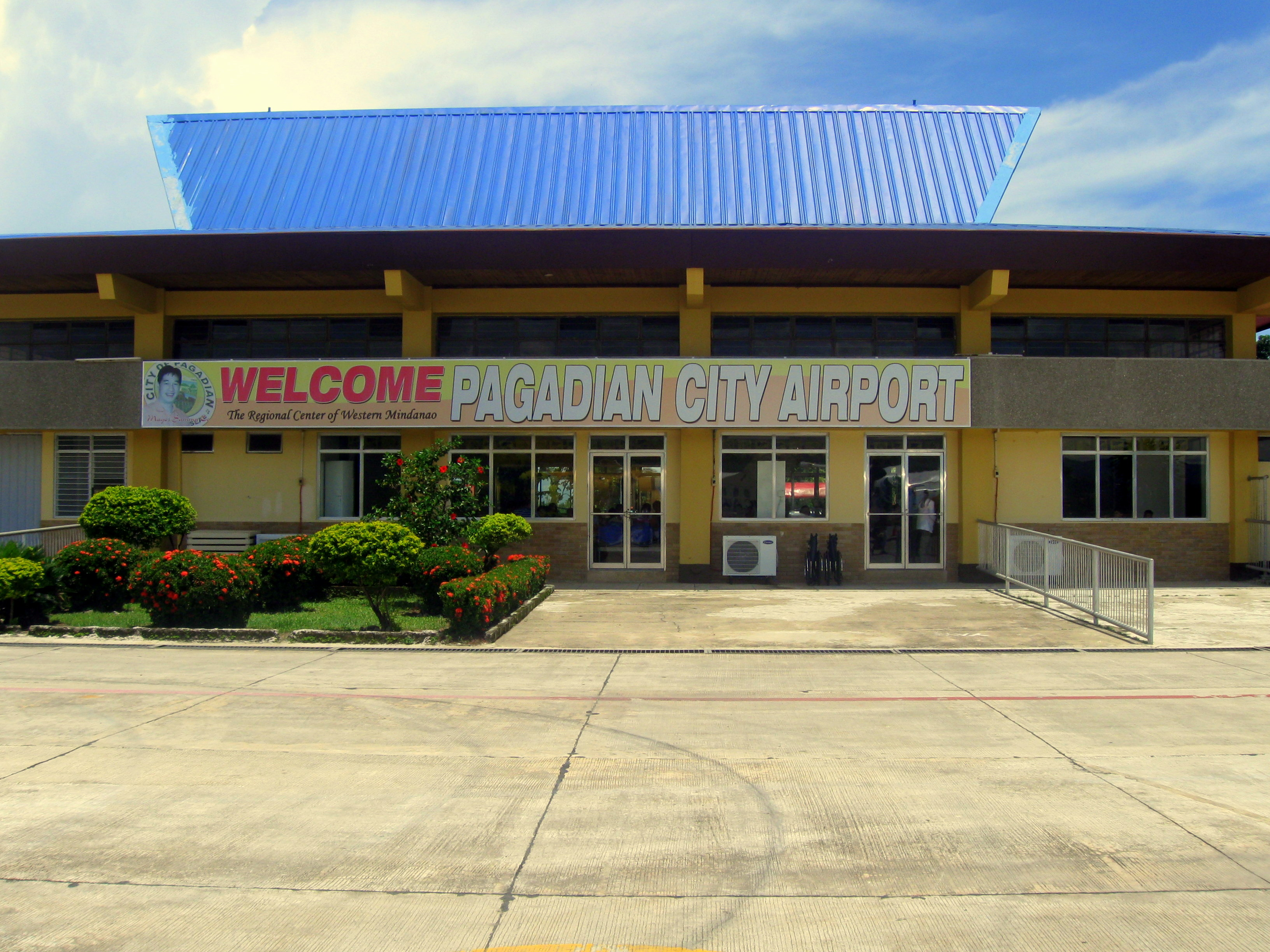
- Pagadian City Airport façade viewed from the apron
- IATA: PAG; ICAO: RPMP

Summary
- Airport type: Public
- Owner/Operator: Civil Aviation Authority of the Philippines
- Serves: Pagadian
- Elevation AMSL: 2 m (6.6 ft)
- Coordinates: 07°49′38″N 123°27′30″E

Map
- Location within Mindanao mainland Location within Philippines

Runways
Direction	Length		Surface
Direction	m	ft	Surface
02/20	2,004	6,575	Concrete

Statistics (2018)
- Passengers: 192,728
- Aircraft movements: 1,646
- Cargo (in kgs): 1,263,742
- Source: Statistics from eFOI

Pagadian Airport (IATA: PAG, ICAO: RPMP), classified Principal Airport Class 1 or major domestic by the Civil Aviation Authority of the Philippines (CAAP), is an airport serving the city of Pagadian, the rest of the province of Zamboanga del Sur, and the province of Zamboanga Sibugay in the Philippines. The CAAP is the arm of the Department of Transportation which operates all the airports in the Philippines except the major international airports.

The airport is located approximately 5 kilometers from the city center and is situated in Barangays Muricay and Tiguma in Pagadian.

== Airlines and destinations ==
Airlines	Destinations
Cebgo	Cebu
Cebu Pacific	Manila

== Renovation and re-opening ==
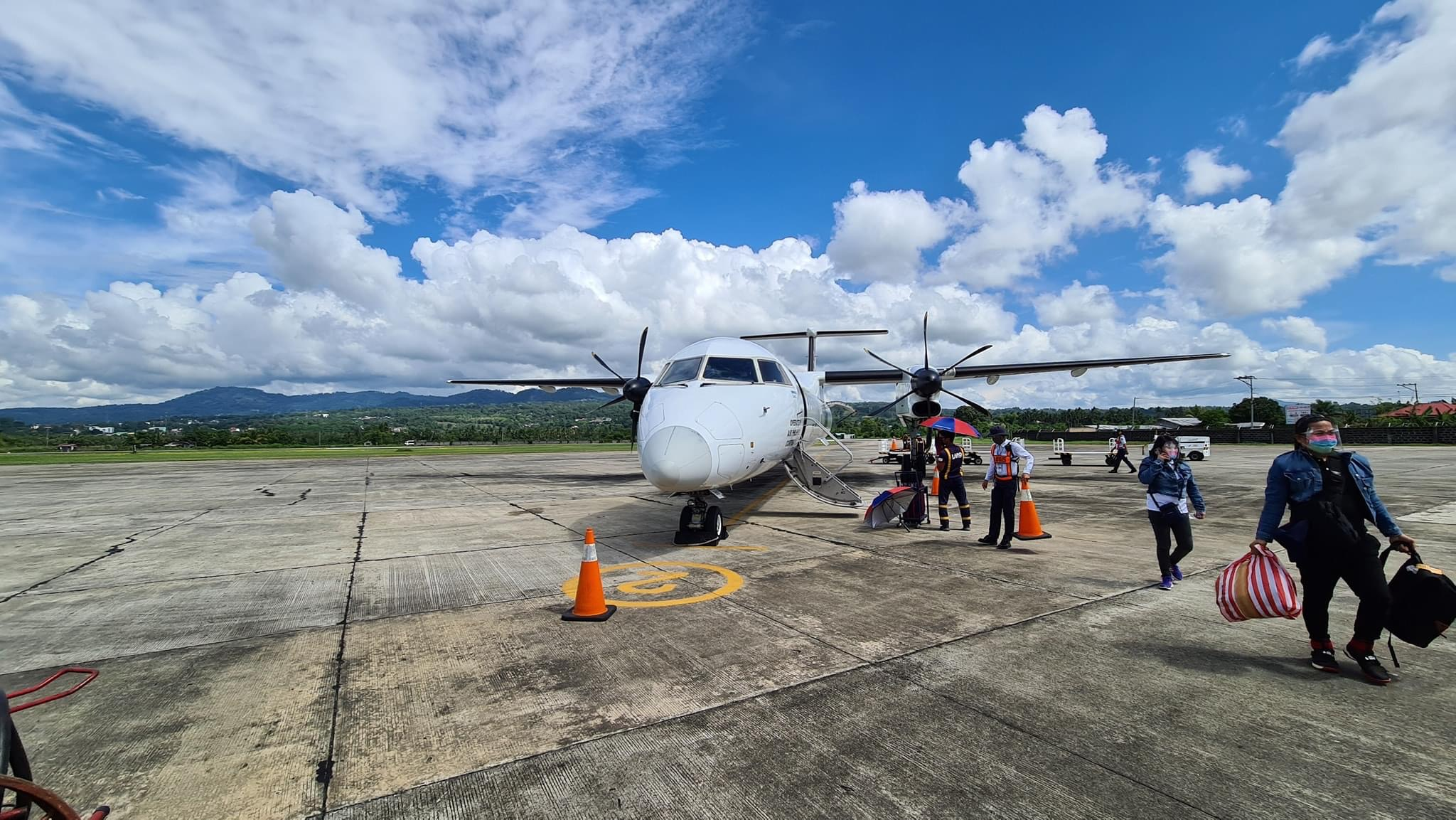
One of PAL Express' Bombardier Q400 sits at the airport's ramp as it disembarks passengers from MNL in May 2021.

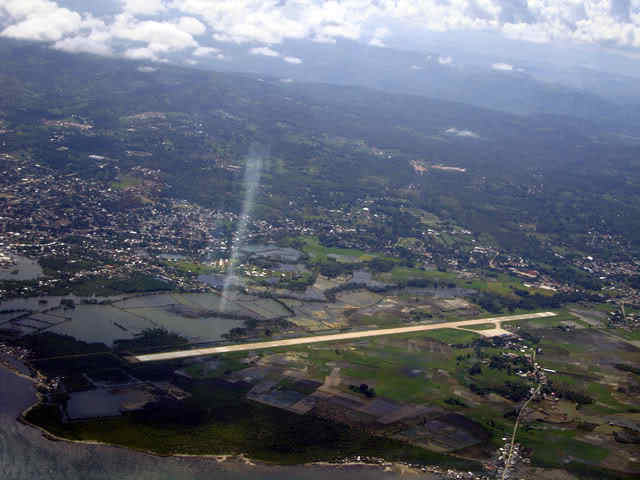
An aerial view of the airport

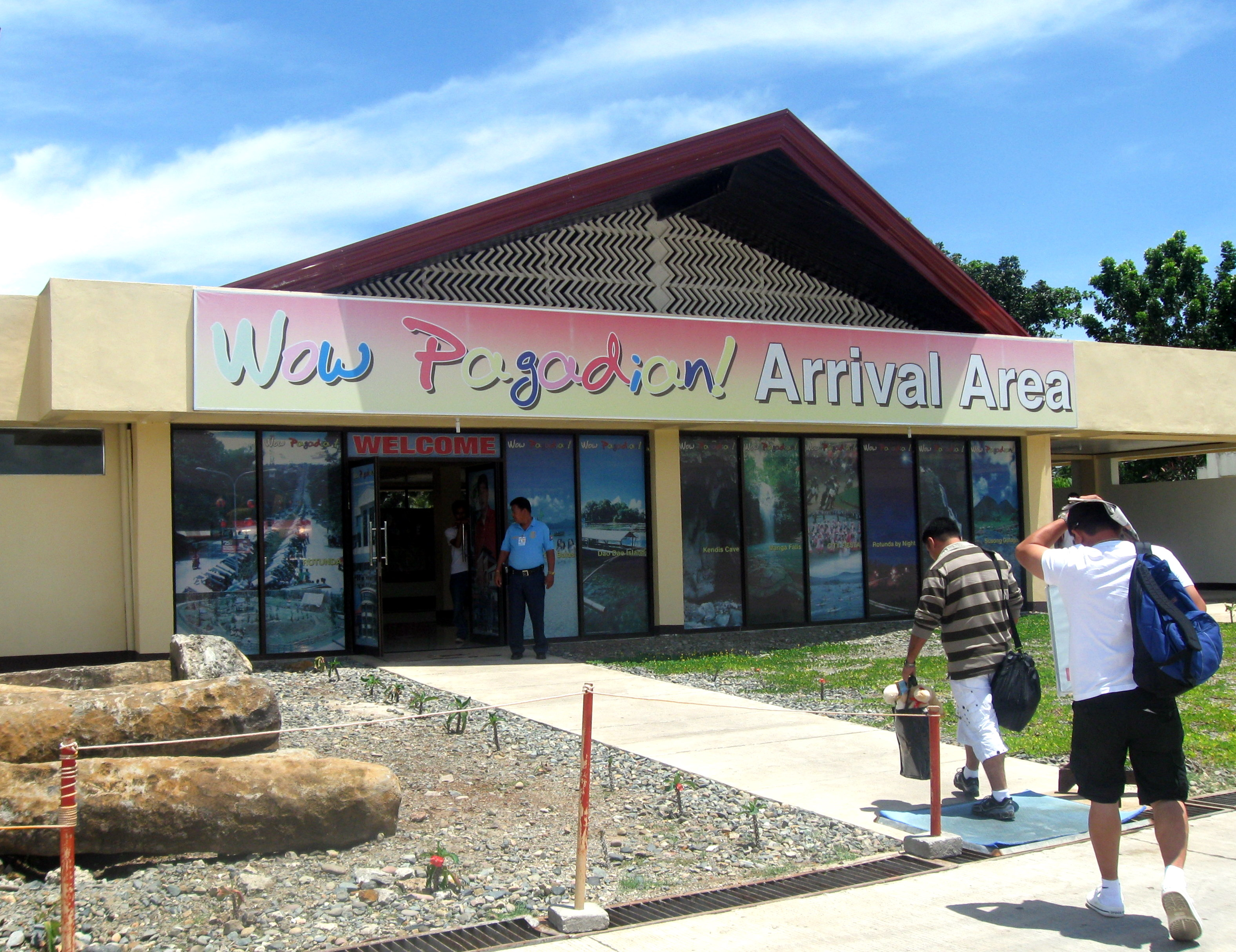
Arrival area

In 2006, the airport underwent a PHP 379.46 million (US$8.72 million) rehabilitation and facility upgrade and was completed in December 2009.

On October 9, 2009, President Gloria Macapagal Arroyo inaugurated the renovated airport. The first aircraft to land on the rehabilitated runway was a Fokker 70 of the Philippine Air Force carrying the Presidential Security Group (PSG) followed by a chartered Dornier 328 of the Royal Star Aviation with tail number RP-C8328 carrying the presidential entourage. The chartered jet from San Miguel Corporation with tail number RP-C8576 which served as the presidential jet was last to land.

The airport officially recommenced commercial operation on April 27, 2010, accommodating the first Cebu Pacific flight from Cebu City to Pagadian. The same airline also sent a plane from Manila to Pagadian on June 9, 2010, which commenced the airline's Pagadian to/from Manila flight offering.

Under Aquino's PPP program, the airport was entitled to a 42 million subsidy for upgrading of its facilities. This includes extension of runway, widening of taxiway, rehabilitation and improvement of passenger terminal building, improvement and expansion of vehicular parking area, construction of drainage system, and construction of perimeter fence.

The airport suspended operations on April 15, 2024 to fix cracks on parts of the runway. The closure was to last for one month.
