= History of Clark Air Base =

US military base in Pampanga, Philippines

The history of Clark Air Base in Pampanga dates back to the early 20th century when it was settled by Filipino military forces. The United States established a presence at the turn of the century.

== Initial American military presence in Angeles ==
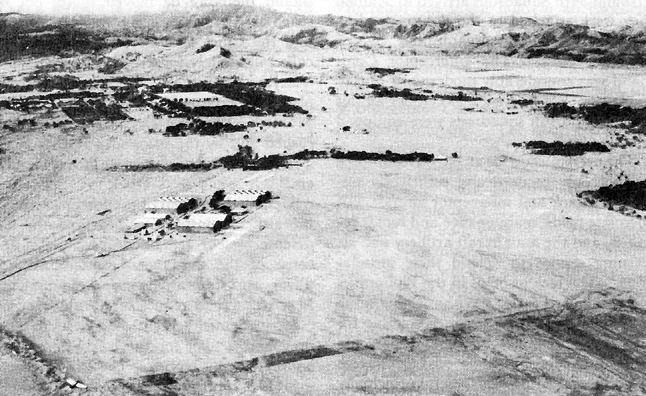
1941: Clark Field in Angeles, Pampanga looking westward. In the upper left center, abutting the foothills of the Zambales Mountains, lies Fort Stotsenburg. The rectangular, tree-lined area is the parade ground.

In the late 19th century, a British company working under contract to the colonial Spanish administration, had completed the Manila–Dagupan Railroad and at the time of America's victory over the Spanish, this still represented the best means of transportation in Luzon. Following the incidents that led to the beginning of US–Philippine hostilities and Emilio Aguinaldo's withdrawal to the north from Manila, the American forces attempted to seize control of this valuable line of communication. The Philippine Army, numbering about 15,000, was just as determined to defend this vital link, and during 1899, fought a series of unsuccessful battles with US forces.

On 17 March 1899, General Aguinaldo moved the seat of his government from Nueva Ecija to the town of Angeles, which lay astride the Manila-Dagupan Railroad, and there celebrated the first anniversary of the Philippine Republic, on 12 June 1899. The Republican government remained hard-pressed by the American advance, and in July, Aguinaldo moved his government again, this time, to the town of Tarlac, further to the north.

The battle for Angeles began on 13 August 1899 and lasted for three days. Opposing the U.S. Army's VIII Corps, commanded by Major General Arthur MacArthur, were Philippine forces under the command of Brigadier General Maximino Hizon, Servillano Aquino, Pio del Pilar, Venancio Concepcion, and Tomas Mascardo. The fighting was fierce and bloody and even though Colonel Alberto San Miguel and a General Makabulos brought fresh reinforcements, the Filipinos finally had to withdraw. They took up positions on the Mabalacat side of the Abacan River and remained there until 5 November, when American cavalry flanking movements rendered these positions untenable. After a final day-long bloody engagement on the 5th, Filipino forces withdrew to the north. Meanwhile, American forces already had taken possession of Angeles.

Initially, the American occupation of Angeles was considered temporary, and the troops lived in tents, temporary shelters, or within the town itself. From mid-August until the final action on 5 November 1899, war-time conditions existed because Aguinaldo's rear guard forces held positions just across the Abacan River.

== Fort Stotsenburg ==
See Fort Stotsenburg

== Beginnings: the 1910s ==
American air power in the Western Pacific began in March 1912 when Lieutenant Frank Lahm established the Philippine Air School with one aircraft. Five years later, construction of the first five of eight hangars would begin. The final three hangars would be completed by the 3d Aero Squadron, U.S. Army, in 1919. This squadron was Clark Field's first aviation unit. Men of the squadron began the grueling work of building the first runway at Fort Stotsenburg in 1919. This airfield would be named after Major Harold M. Clark; when completed Clark Field became the only American airdrome west of Hawaii.

The DeHavilland DH-4 became the first U.S. Army airplane to be deployed at Clark Field, arriving in 1919. This DH-4 was flown by Major Roy Brown, Commander of the 3d Aero Squadron, and, as was the custom of the day, bore his personal insignia.

The fledgling U.S. Army Air Corps was forced to use a variety of aircraft from different sources to keep its units up to strength. Around 1920, World War I SPAD S.VIIs of French manufacture were deployed to Clark Field.

=== Housing on base ===
The first airmen at Clark Field constructed their "dormitories" in September 1919. The 20-man tents were put up under a canopy of cogon grass, which cooled the interiors. By 1920, a 200-bed capacity single enlisted quarters with natural air-conditioning provided by large, unscreened windows had replaced the 3d Aero Squadron's original tents.

After the establishment of Clark Field, new family and bachelor officers quarters were needed. In 1920, construction of eight "barns" were completed near what is now the intersection of Dau Avenue and Marrat Highway.

== The 1920s ==
By the mid-1920s, the initial stages of construction at Clark had been completed such as aircraft hangars and support buildings. Also completed by this time were enlisted barracks, a bachelor officers quarters, and eight "barns" along what is now Marratt Highway.

It was in the 1920s that the Martin MB-2 biplane was introduced and subsequently extensively used for Clark Field operations. The U.S. Army Air Service contingent in the Philippines consisted of the 28th Bombardment and 3rd Pursuit Squadrons, forming the 4th Composite Group.

During this decade, General Aguinaldo would also have the opportunity to visit Fort Stotsenburg and Clark Airfield. Having served in the Philippines during the Philippine–American War, General Billy Mitchell revisited Fort Stotsenburg in 1924 during a 9-month survey of the Pacific aerial defenses. During this visit, Mitchell gave a flying lesson to the leader of the Philippine Revolution, General Emilio Aguinaldo, whom he had helped capture.

In the 1920s the 2nd Battalion of the 24th Field Artillery Regiment was activated and regularly went to Camp O'Donnell for target practice or to Lingayen, Pangasinan for maneuvers with all U.S. forces based on Luzon. This regiment was composed of Philippine Scouts who were led by officers derived from the Regular Army or from the ranks of Filipino officers who had attended West Point.

== The 1930s ==
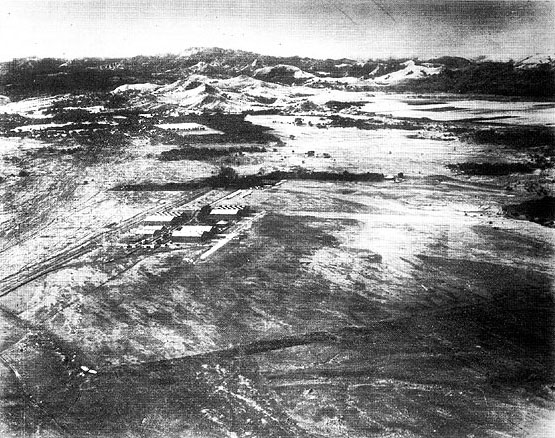
Clark Field in 1938

Martin B-10s were stationed at Clark Field with the 28th Bombardment Squadron in the late 1930s. When the 28th received new B-17s, three of these very outmoded B-10s were transferred to the Philippine Army Air Corps.

== World War II: the 1940s ==
=== Japanese attack ===
On 8 December 1941, General Douglas MacArthur, who recently had been called back to active service and placed in command of all U.S. and Philippine forces, had known of the attack on Pearl Harbor since about five in the morning, but insisted on delaying any hostile act by the forces under his command until the Japanese committed an overt attack on the Philippines, this was in accordance to instructions received from General George Marshall in Washington. It is also likely that MacArthur was influenced by his close friend Philippine President Manuel Quezon, who wanted the Philippines to remain neutral and thus be spared Japanese attack. Major General Lewis H. Brereton, Far East Air Force Commander, met with Major General Richard Sutherland, MacArthur's Chief of Staff, and argued in vain that his bombers at Clark should be allowed to strike military targets on Taiwan, the location from which everyone felt the Japanese attack would come. Meanwhile, the B-17s at Clark were loaded first with anti-ship ordnance. Later, that order was rescinded and different bombs were uploaded for use against Japanese airfields on Taiwan. Eventually, Brereton got permission to send one B-17 on a reconnaissance mission to the north. When the attack on Clark Field came, maintenance crews were in the process of preparing the one reconnaissance plane, changing the bomb loads in the other B-17s, and refueling the fighters, which had just come in from patrol. The aircrews were eating lunch. They were sitting ducks.

On 8 December 1941, the US Far East Air Force consisted of the 19th Bombardment Group (Heavy) under Colonel Eugene L. Eubank at Clark and the 24th Pursuit Group under Colonel Orrin L. Grover, also at Clark. The 19th had

- 3 B-17s assigned and consisted of the 28th and 30th Squadrons (8 B-17s and 2 B-18s) at Del Monte Field on Mindanao, a total of 13 craft
- the 24th Pursuit Group with its outmoded 18 P-35s was at nearby Del Carmen Field, now Basa Air Base, 18 craft
- the 24th Group consisted of the 3rd Pursuit Squadron (18 P-40Es) at Iba and the 17th and 21st Squadrons, with 18 P-40Es each, at Nichols Field, Manila, now Villamor Air Base, a total of 54 craft
- the 2nd Observation Squadron also had O-46 and O-52 aircraft at Clark
- Philippine Army Air Corps assets were old and few: 42 PT-13 trainers, 12 P-26 fighters, and three B-10s, a total of 57 craft.

The total number of available military airplanes at that moment was over 142 aircraft (not counting the O-46s and O-52s). Within a few hours, despite heroic efforts, almost all of these aircraft, with the exception of the ones deployed to Mindanao, were gone.

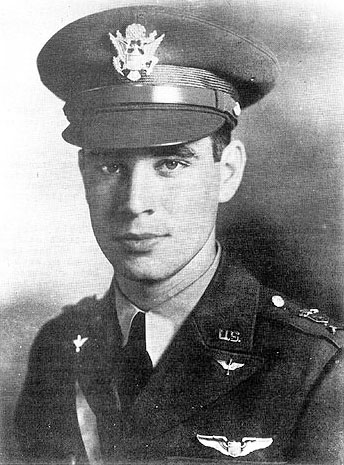
Major Boyd D. Wagner

Captain Boyd Wagner, a native of Nanty Glo, Pennsylvania, was Commander of the 17th Pursuit Squadron on 8 December 1941, when the Japanese attacked Clark Field, and became one of the first American pilots to engage the enemy in the air. Later in the month, he became the first American World War II ace when he downed his fifth Japanese aircraft. Wagner High School and Wagner Middle School were named for Captain Wagner, who offered Americans a rare "bright" spot in the otherwise bleak news they were receiving about the defense of the Philippines.

Following the Japanese air attacks on Clark Field and other military areas in the Philippines on 8 December 1941, and the subsequent landing of Japanese ground forces on Luzon, General Douglas MacArthur activated War Plan Orange. This plan called for the gradual withdrawal of American and Philippine forces south past several defensive positions (one of which ran through Tarlac, just north of Clark) to the Bataan Peninsula, where they could await reinforcements from Hawaii and the U.S. The defense of Bataan in the face of vastly overwhelming numbers and terrible battle conditions proved beyond a doubt the capabilities of the untested Allied forces. At one point during this period in early 1942, Philippine Brigadier General Vicente Lim established his headquarters in a pigpen.

After the collapse of American/Filipino defense lines on Bataan and the decisions to declare Manila an open city to end the defense of Corregidor, American and Filipino prisoners of war were marched at gunpoint back up the Bataan Peninsula to San Fernando, Pampanga, about 11 miles south of Fort Stotsenburg. Here, they were jammed into railroad box cars and taken to Camp O'Donnell, near Capas, Tarlac, about 15 miles north of Fort Stotsenburg.

==== Bataan Death March ====
Thousands of Filipino soldiers and hundreds of American soldiers died of their wounds on the infamous Bataan Death March. Others were brutally murdered by Japanese troops when they could not keep up with the pace. The men of the Bataan Death March passed by the main gate of Clark Air Base, as the soldiers followed the direction of the railway tracks north. Later, following their initial incarceration at Camp O'Donnell, most American POWs were moved to Cabanatuan, while their Filipino comrades remained at Camp O'Donnell.

Some of the American prisoners who were interned at Camp O'Donnell were sent to Fort Stotsenburg and were forced to perform menial labor for their Japanese conquerors. These prisoners were considered the lucky ones as the others who remained in O'Donnell or Cabanatuan were moved aboard freighters to Japanese slave labor camps in the home islands. The Japanese refused to mark these vessels with the appropriate insignia, and many of them fell victim to American submarines, whose crews had no idea that the enemy ships they sent to the bottom carried fellow Americans aboard. (See also Hell ships).

From 1903 to 1942, the American forces used Lily Hill primarily as an observation point and the Japanese followed suit when they occupied Clark. During the American attack on Clark, tunnels were dug beneath its surface and it was from this point that the Japanese made their final defense. After World War II, the USAF established it first aircraft warning and control unit which remained on its summit, until relocated to Wallace Air Station at Poro Point on the Lingayen Gulf coast in December 1962. In 1955, the underbrush on Lily Hill was burned back, revealing the remains of two Japanese aircraft and many smaller artifacts attesting to Japan's strong defense of Clark.

=== Birthplace of the Kamikaze ===
A marker, naming the birthplace of the Kamikaze is located 2 miles (3.2 km) north of the town of Mabalacat on MacArthur Highway, along Clark's eastern perimeter. During the war, the American liberators thought that these suicide planes were flying from Northern Luzon, but in their postwar interrogations, Japanese airmen insisted that the attacks had originated at Clark Field. This fact subsequently was confirmed: two Kamikaze pilots had flown circuitous routes to avoid U.S. fighter patrols, and thus had left the impression that the attacks came from Northern Luzon.

During the course of the American liberation of the Philippines, the Japanese conducted extensive counter air operations from Clark Field. Japanese Kamikaze pilots also operated from an airstrip just north of Clark, near Mabalacat, Pampanga, against allied shipping. During the liberation of the Philippines, Americans extensively bombed Clark, thus, for the second time in only a few years, the base came under heavy attack.

Post-war investigations revealed that from the beginning of Allied air attacks on Clark, Nichols, and Nielson fields in October 1944 until February 1945, 1,505 Japanese aircraft were put out of action on the ground. At Clark, the heavy bomber attacks had caused the Japanese to disperse repair shops, storage areas, and maintenance units, scattering them as far as Bamban. Sometimes, parts were hidden or even buried, often becoming inaccessible later. One captured Japanese aircraft needed only one of the carburetors buried at Mabalacat to be ready for flight. In fact, when Allied troops captured Mabalacat, they found over 200 aircraft engines, some of which had never been uncrated.

=== 201st Fighter Squadron, Fuerza Aérea Expedicionária Mexicana ===
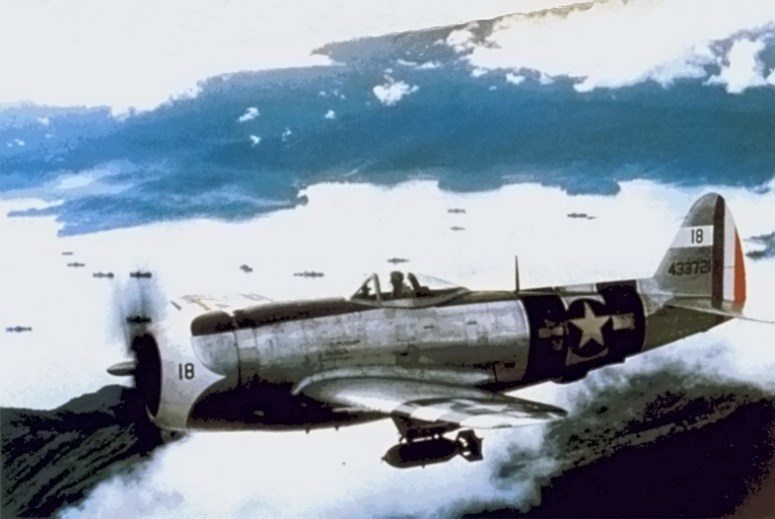
Mexican P-47D using both USAAF and FAM insignia (right wing and tail)

During World War II, the U.S. Army Air Corps undertook the training of several contingents of personnel from many Central and South American nations. Brazil provided the largest of these contingents, with Mexico in second place. The P-47 Thunderbolt-equipped 201st Fighter Squadron of the Fuerza Aérea Expedicionária Mexicana arrived in the Philippines in early 1945 and participated in the Luzon Campaign, as well as in subsequent operations against Formosa.

=== Sneak attacks and Japanese defense of Clark ===
Following the 8 December 1941 air attack on Clark Field and MacArthur's decision to fall back on Bataan, American forces abandoned Fort Stotsenburg. Thus, except for the airdrome itself, the base was spared the ravages of war. When the American counterattack on Stotsenburg began in late 1944, the Japanese made the decision to defend the base at all costs. From beginning to end, the defense lasted more than a month. Although the Sixth Army's 37th Infantry Division declared that Clark Field and Fort Stotsenburg had been "liberated" on 31 January 1945, remnants of Japanese forces hiding in the Zambales foothills west of the field could still do some damage. Damage to base facilities from the protracted fighting was extensive.

== Reconstruction: late-1940s and 1950s ==
Post World War II, Clark Field saw a building boom, with barracks, operations, and storage buildings being constructed at a breakneck pace. Constructed during this period were "liberation barracks", which housed enlisted men, a base operations building, a post office building, an outdoor movie theater, the NCO Open Mess, and the Clark AB golf course, once one of the finest golf courses on any U.S. military installation in the world, and the renovation of the Officers' Restaurant and the Clark Air Base Officers' Open Mess (CABOOM). Religious facilities would also be constructed.

Clark's Base Headquarters was nicknamed "The Little Pentagon" because it consisted of five long quonset huts radiating out from a central area. It was built on Henry Avenue at the east end of the Parade Ground in 1947 as administrative offices on the site of the original 217-bed Post Hospital, which dated back to September 1903. Behind the hospital was an open field used for horse grazing, troop drills, and cavalry practice. Old houses still in the area were used as doctors' quarters. On the site of the Philippine Long Distance Telephone Company office, were the nurses' quarters. During the Japanese occupation, the old hospital was used both as a dispensary and barracks. Soldiers heated water for bathing in the big steel drums directly in front of the building. Doctors and their families occupied the barns that clustered around the hospital. With the adoption of the 1979 amended Military Bases Agreement and the establishment of Philippine sovereignty over Clark AB, Base Headquarters was moved to the Clark Air Base Compound Building at the intersection of Bong and Dyess Highways. In 1986, workers began demolishing the Pentagon to make for a new Combat Support Group Headquarters Building.

At the end of World War II, Clark Field, like so many other American bases in the Western Pacific, became a dumping ground for battle-damaged equipment. Clark was a major dumping ground for P-38 "Lightnings", the mainstay of the Allied air forces in the Pacific. After being stripped of all usable material, these aircraft were simply pushed into giant pits and covered with dirt. Such "boneyards" exist at several locations on Clark and occasionally, new construction efforts result in the rediscovery of one or more of these almost completely decomposed aircraft and equipment.

=== From the Army to the Air Force ===
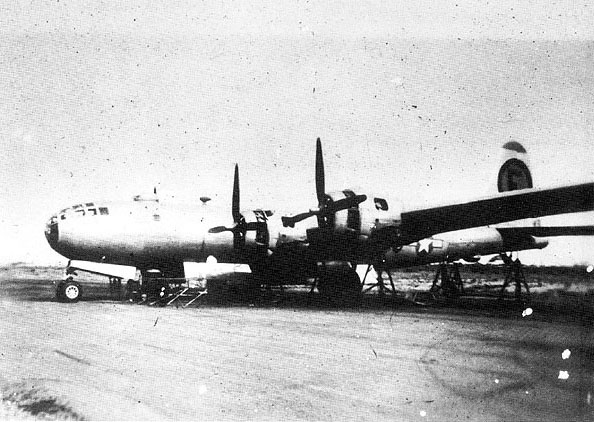
A Boeing B-29 Superfortress undergoing maintenance at Clark Field

Clark Field remained an Army Air Base until May 1949, when its facilities were transferred to the U.S. Air Force. Prior to this a build-up of aircraft, air wings and maintenance facilities were already being staged at Clark. On 14 August 1948, the 18th Fighter Wing was organized at Clark.

In the early 1950s a larger, more modern facility located along O'Leary Avenue, near its intersection with Dyess Highway, was constructed to house the Clark Base Exchange. This structure last housed the Philippine Area Exchange Arcade, a conglomeration of concessionaire businesses.

The Silver Wing Recreation Center, constructed in 1949, provided a host of activities for assigned personnel and their dependents, including tours, musical instruction, chess, card, and billiard tournaments. The base telegraph office also occupied space in this large building.

Named for Lieutenant Colin P. Kelly, a B-17 pilot who was killed in action against the Japanese during the air defense of the Philippines, the Kelly Theater opened in 1953. It served as one of the two auditoria/theaters on Clark, with the other being the Bobbitt theater near the Main Base Exchange. Kelly Theater was located just off Dau Avenue, adjacent to the Kelly Cafeteria.

The Airmen's Open mess was established in Building 5721 on Bong Highway in 1954. Initially known as the "Lower 4 Club" (referring to the rank), this facility later received the name Coconut Grove.

A large stadium, which is to the southwest of the "main base", was completed in 1955. The bowl originally was named Sebille Stadium in honor of Major Louis J. Sebille, a Medal of Honor recipient, who was killed in action in Korea on 5 August 1950. Since the designation was never made official, the facility was later renamed. While it played host to numerous sporting and entertainment events, the Bamboo Bowl's "shining hour" came in the spring of 1975, when it and its grounds served as the site for the massive tent city that supported Operations "New Life" and "Babylift." In 1986, to honor the memory of the seven astronauts who perished aboard the Space Shuttle Challenger, the stadium was renamed "Challenger Field."

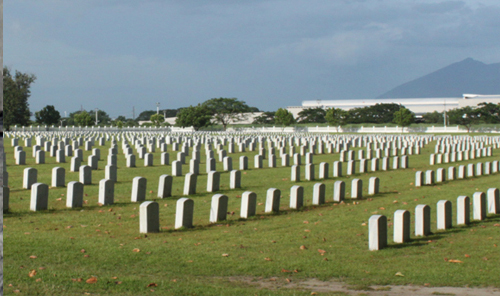
2011 photo of existing Clark Veterans Cemetery with Mt. Arayat visible in the background

=== Clark Veterans Cemetery ===
A cemetery for American veterans and Filipino workers was established near the front gate of Clark Base in 1900. The cemetery is undergoing restoration and remains active.

== Vietnam War era ==
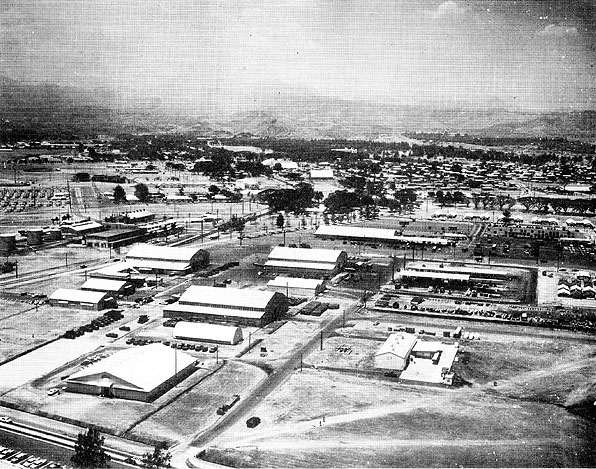
Clark Air Base in 1967, looking west from the control tower.

In 1960, the USAF began construction of a new modern Regional Medical Facility at Clark. The new 200-bed Clark AB Hospital/Regional Medical Center was completed in April 1964 at a cost of $4.5 million. The new hospital occupied the same site (off Dyess Highway near its intersection with O'Leary Avenue) that had been in use for this purpose for some time. The original Fort Stotsenburg hospital had been located at the east end of the Parade Ground, on the site now occupied by the Headquarters Building for the 3d Combat Support Group. There has been much speculation regarding paranormal activity at this site, spurred on partially by an appearance in the SyFy reality series "Ghost Hunters".

As the U.S. became more deeply involved in the war in Southeast Asia, Clark's role as a supporting base became more important and more people were assigned than could be housed in existing permanent quarters. Even new dormitories proved insufficient to meet the influx and so "temporary" housing once again came to Clark.

Prior to the construction of this facility in 1966, transient officers were billeted in quonset huts in the library area and Bachelor Officers Quarters were located in the Hill area. Chambers Hall, which was named for Captain Samuel "Bud" P. Chambers III, who was killed in action while making an approach to Tan Son Nhut, Vietnam, on 29 June 1965, is located on Bong Highway, just to the west of the Base Library and to the north of the Parade Ground. It contains 30 apartments for bachelor officers and 294 rooms for transients. As large as this facility is, during Thirteenth Air Force operations, such as its periodic Cope Thunder training exercises, many transients have to be billeted in contracted hotels off-base.

The nerve center for Clark's flying operations was the Base Operations Building. This was opened in 1968 and replaced an earlier structure located in the same area. The new building contained a cafeteria, barber shop, dispatch counter, weather office, and a secure command center.

Meanwhile, the 3d Tactical Fighter Wing (which had previously been at Bien Hoa Air Base, Vietnam) moved to Clark Air Base on 16 September 1974 and became the base's host unit, replacing the 405th Tactical Fighter Wing. The 3d Tactical Fighter Wing had inherited the lineage and honors of the 3d Bomb Group, formed in July 1919, when that unit was inactivated. One of its squadrons, the 3d Tactical Fighter Squadron, was the first to be assigned to Clark during the interwar years as the 3d Aero Squadron and later the 3d Pursuit Squadron (Interceptor). The 3d Pursuit participated in the vain attempt to defend against the Japanese air attacks of 8 December 1941, accounting for almost all of the enemy aircraft downed by American fighter planes during that engagement.

=== Confrontation ===
Following several late-night violent attacks against American personnel by Filipino citizens during the late summer of 1968, the Base Commander, Colonel Ernest P. Pate established a curfew. The city government of Angeles City retaliated by declaring the entire city off-limits to U.S. personnel, and the situation deteriorated from there. The events culminated in a series of demonstrations against the base by Filipino nationals, with the major outburst occurring on 4 October 1968.

This confrontation marked the high-tide of feelings on both sides and relations quickly returned to normal.

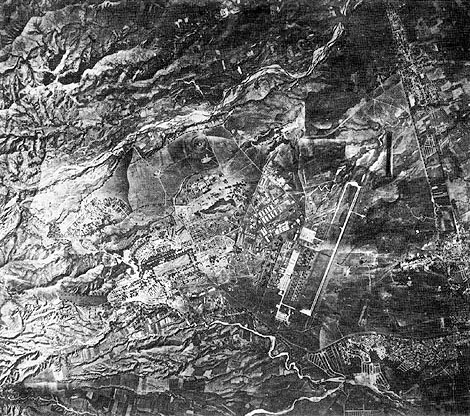
Clark Air Base in the 1970s

=== Operation Homecoming ===
Shortly after his election as U.S. president in 1968, Richard M. Nixon began the long process of negotiating an end to the conflict in Southeast Asia. At the same time, the number of American forces in SEA was gradually reduced in favor of what came to be known as Vietnamization of that conflict. Under the Nixon Doctrine, the U.S. continued to provide diplomatic, financial, and logistical support to Southeast Asian non-communist governments, but to lessen correspondingly the active roles of its own armed forces in those nations. One of the most pressing U.S. demands was for a full North Vietnamese release of American POWs and an accurate accounting of U.S. servicemen missing or killed in action. Late in 1972, a basic North Vietnamese/American agreement was reached and planning for the repatriation of U.S. POWs initiated. As the major staging base for the American involvement in SEA, Clark Air Base was designated as the initial point to which the POWs could return from Hanoi.

The first group of returnees from Vietnam arrived at Clark at approximately 1615 hours, 12 February 1973. On hand to greet them at planeside were Admiral Noel Gayler, Commander-in-Chief of the Pacific Command; Lieutenant General William G. Moore, Thirteenth Air Force Commander; and Air Force Senior Master Sergeant Homer E. Henderson, Joint Information Bureau Assistant Non-commissioned Officer-in-Charge.

On 6 April 1975, the Clark Air Base Peace Garden was dedicated to the memory of those who died or were declared "missing in action" in Southeast Asia.

=== Operation Babylift/New Life ===
Two years after the ending of America's ground combat role in Southeast Asia and the repatriation of its POWs from North Vietnamese concentration camps, the Communist forces in Vietnam, Laos, and Cambodia began to score a stunning series of victories. American response was speedy and typical: a massive evacuation of Vietnamese orphan children that came to be known as Operation Babylift. This humanitarian effort suffered a major setback on 4 April 1975, when the initial C-5A Galaxy carrying evacuees crashed shortly after taking off from Saigon's Tan Son Nhut Air Base, killing 98 children, 46 escorts, and 11 USAF crewmembers. "Babylift" continued despite this incident, however, and as the Communist forces continued their string of successes, it expanded to cover the evacuation of adult refugees from Saigon, Phnom Penh, and Vientiane, as well. By this time, the operation's nickname had changed to "New Life", from 21 to 28 April 1975, more than 2,000 people were housed in a massive tent city, adjacent to the "Bamboo Bowl" stadium. The first planeload of Vietnamese orphans arrived at Clark on 5 April 1975.

=== Clark becomes a Philippine base ===
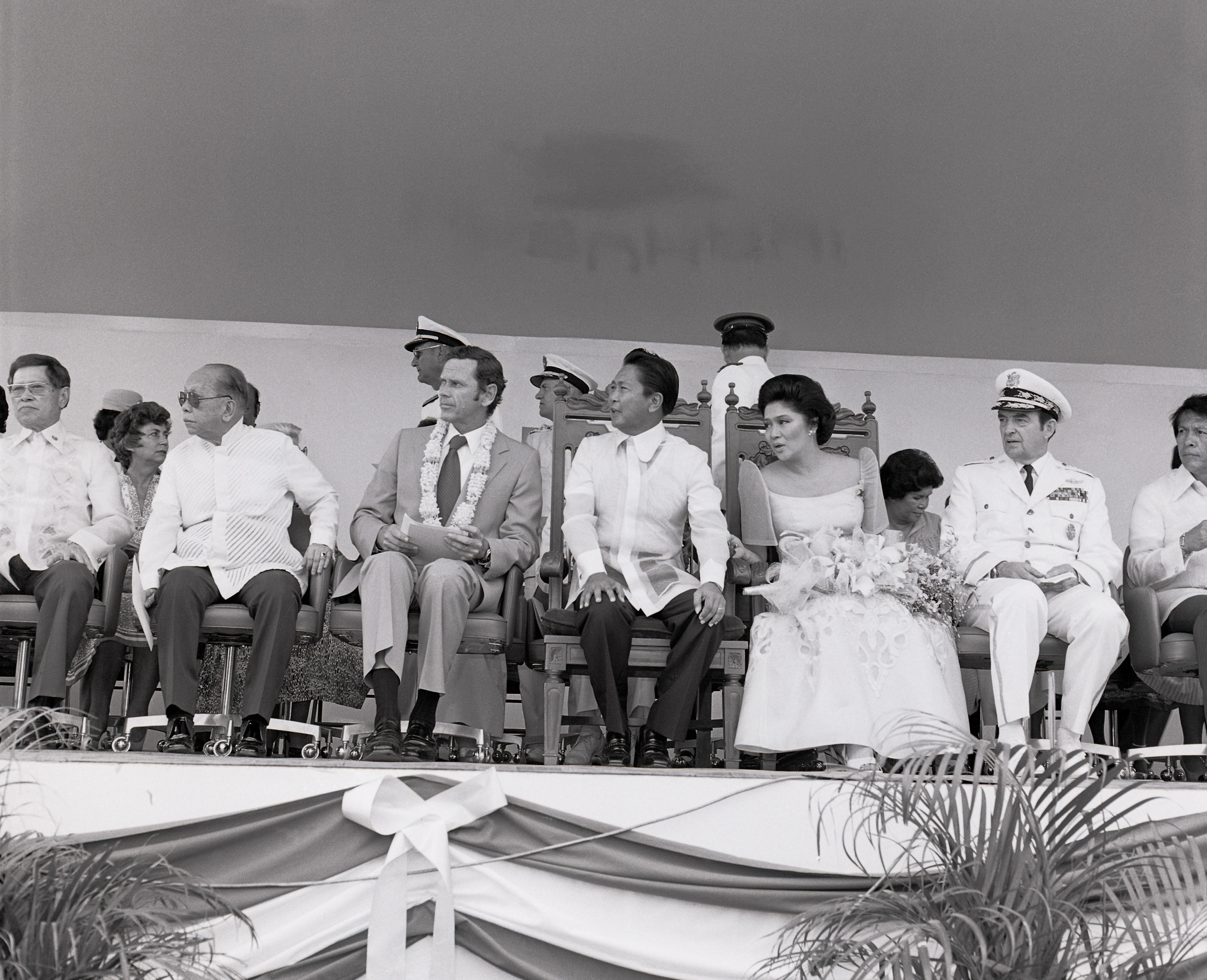
Foreign Minister of the Philippines, Carlos P. Romulo; Ambassador Richard W. Murphy; Philippine President Ferdinand Marcos; Imelda Marcos; and Chairman of the Joint Chiefs of Staff, General David C. Jones

From 1902 to 1979, Fort Stotsenburg/Clark AB remained U.S. possessions, guaranteed by the Military Bases Agreement (MBA) signed by the U.S. and the Republic of the Philippines on 14 March 1947. During 1978, following negotiations that had lasted on and off since the early 1970s, the two governments agreed to establish Philippine sovereignty over former American bases in the country and thus the Clark Air Base Command of the Armed Forces of the Philippines(AFP)came into being, following the signing of a revised MBA on 7 January 1979. To commemorate this event, the Philippine government constructed an arch based upon the design of a typical native Salakot hat. This structure was erected just in front of the Main Gate on Mitchell Highway, between the base proper and Angeles City and soon became a widely recognized symbol of this new spirit in the long tradition of Philippine-American relations.

One of the most significant developments in Philippine-American relations was the promulgation of the revised 1979 MBA that, for the first time on over 75 years, established Philippine sovereignty over former U.S. Bases in the country. To facilitate its management of base areas outside of those specifically designated as part of the U.S. facility and to supervise perimeter and gate security, the AFP established Clark Air Base Command (CABCOM) on 16 February 1979, and assigned Brigadier General Oscar M. Alejandro as its first Deputy Commander. (Under Philippine regulations, the AFP Chief of Staff served as CABCOM Commander.) By the end of 1983, CABCOM had over 700 personnel assigned, serving in administrative and security posts.

== In the midst of a revolution: the 1980s ==
=== Live television broadcasts from the United States ===
The last day of 1983 saw the beginning of a new era at Clark Air Base with the transmission of live television broadcasts from the United States through the Satellite Earth Terminal. With the "SATNET", Far East Network-Philippines was able to bring timely information, news and entertainment programs to the Clark area.

=== The February 1986 Revolution ===
On 24 February, Philippine Air Force aircraft from the rebel 15th Strike Wing requested permission to land. Their original intent had been to land, refuel and rearm, but the U.S. policy of strict neutrality forbade this. Instead, Washington allowed any aircraft declaring an "emergency" to land for "humanitarian" reasons. By the time the revolution ended, Clark had become "safe haven" for a large segment of the PAF: six T-28s, five T-33s, seven F-8s, two F-47s, two C-130s, one MD-500, and two Twin Otters. The presence of these aircraft caused another problem: if the loyalist forces realized they were present, they might have tried to destroy them from the air or in a ground attack. No such threat materialized but, USAF forces at Kadena Air Base and United States Navy aircraft were ready to support Clark if it became necessary.

Clark's most significant role was the evacuation of President Marcos, his immediate family, and several advisors and confidants, including General Fabian Ver and Eduardo Cojuangco. By 25 February 1986, most of the AFP had switched to the rebel side and loyalist forces from northern Luzon, under Brigadier General Tomas Dumpit, who supposedly were on their way to attack Enrile and Ramos never materialized. President Ronald Reagan clearly had thrown his support to Aquino and the best that could be hoped for was to beat a safe retreat. Both U.S. Ambassador Steven Bosworth and Joint U.S. Military Advisory Group Brigadier General Theodore Allen were in communication with Malacañang and Clark, as well as Washington. Later in the afternoon of the 25th, the decision was made to evacuate Marcos from the palace. Helicopters from Clark's 31st Aerospace Rescue and Recovery Squadron flew to Manila, picked up the Presidential party, and returned to the base, arriving just after 9 p.m.

The ex-President, his wife and immediate family, along with General Ver, occupied 13AF Distinguished Visitor quarters, while the rest of the entourage had to be billeted in Chambers Hall. Along with the Marcos party, Clark AB personnel packaged up and sent out a considerable amount of "personal effects", the same ones that later were seized by U.S. Customs officials in Hawaii and which became the subject of so much media controversy.

After spending the night on-base, the group, now swelled by several family members of sides and associates who had arrived during the night, boarded a C-9A Nightingale and a C-141 Starlifter and flew to Guam and then Hawaii, where President Marcos went into exile.

=== New construction ===
For many years, the base had languished in the backwaters of PACAF's military construction program, but that ended in the early 1980s, and since that time, the base witnessed the opening of several new facilities.

One of the first of these new facilities, a modern Youth Center, first opened its doors on 29 March 1984. The old Youth Center, which had been housed in the original Kelly Theater, became a skating rink. This new Youth Center building houses a number of features designed to appeal to the younger members of Clark's community: an airconditioned basketball court, large screen television, disco, pool and ping-pong tables, video games, and a snack bar.

A new Base Commissary was opened in April 1984. Initially begun in 1980, this facility, which contained state-of-the-art equipment and marketing concepts, cost a total of $6.2 million and at the time of its commissioning, was the largest in the world. The new Commissary was located on Dyess Highway, almost next door to the old one and adjacent to the old NCO club.

One of the most anticipated examples of Clark's new construction boom was the Golf Club House, which officially opened in August 1985. The modern building offers the facilities typically found in a clubhouse, as well as a pro shop, a restaurant, and panoramic views of the golf course.

The site of this new building was once part of the old Fort Stotsenburg cemetery, and during the digging for its foundation, several old iron crosses were uncovered. Time and the elements combined to reduce most of these to rust, but one was still in remarkably good condition and has been preserved for display in the Clark Historical Center.

== Closure ==
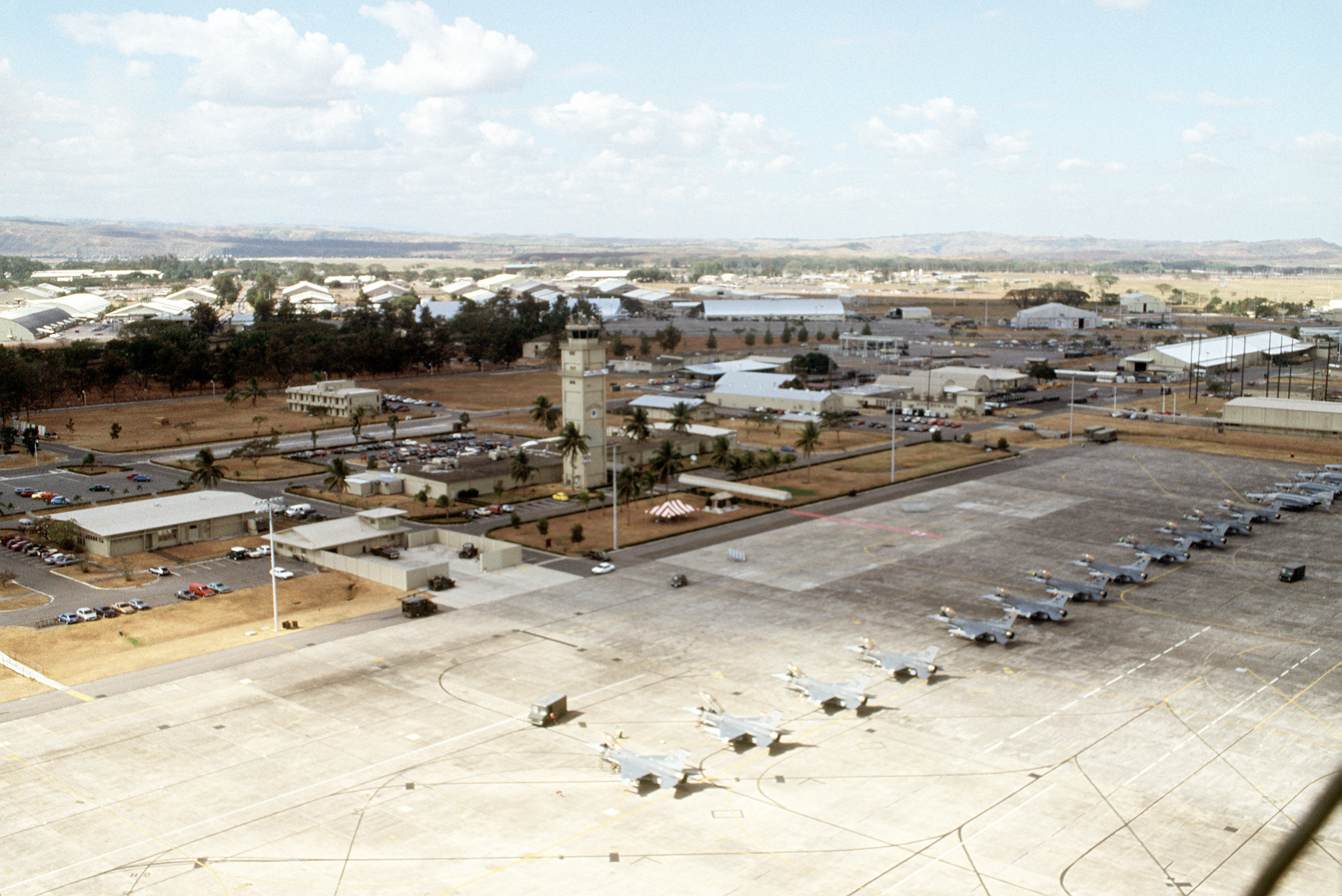
The base flightline, as taken in 1990

With the end of the Cold War, operations at the base were scaled back with many of the men and equipment moving to other bases, including returning to the U.S. In 1990, the last combat aircraft, a squadron of F-4 fighter-bombers, were transferred to Alaska. On 10 June 1991, two days before Mount Pinatubo began the summer-long series of eruptions, Clark Air Base was completely evacuated of all but mission essential personnel.

In July 1991, the U.S. and Philippine negotiators agreed to a new treaty regarding the lease of the Subic Bay Naval Base, Clark, and several other U.S. military installations in the Philippines. Under the agreement, the U.S. was to clean up Clark and turn the base over to the Philippine government in 1992 while leasing Subic Bay for another 10 years. The Philippine Senate rejected this extension of the Military Bases Agreement on 16 September 1991. On 26 November 1991, the U.S. government formally turned Clark over to the Philippine government, which transformed the airfield into Clark International Airport.

== Reopening ==
In June 2012, following actions from Chinese claims in the South China Sea, the Philippine government agreed to the return of American military forces to Clark.
