= Clark International Airport =

Airport near Mabalacat, Pampanga, Philippines

Clark International Airport Pangyatung Sulapawan ning Clark Paliparang Pandaigdig ng Clark

- The airport terminal in April 2024
- IATA: CRK; ICAO: RPLC; WMO: 98327

Summary
- Airport type: Public / military
- Owner: Clark International Airport Corporation
- Operator: Luzon International Premier Airport Development (LIPAD) Corporation
- Serves: Metro Clark
- Location: Clark, Angeles City and Mabalacat, Pampanga, Philippines
- Opened: June 16, 1996; 30 years ago
- Hub for: PAL Express; UPS Airlines
- Operating base for: Cebgo; Cebu Pacific; Sunlight Air
- Time zone: PHT (UTC+08:00)
- Elevation AMSL: 148 m (486 ft)
- Coordinates: 15°11′09″N 120°33′35″E
- Website: clarkinternationalairport.com

Maps
- Location within Luzon Location within Philippines

Runways
Direction	Length		Surface
Direction	m	ft	Surface
02/20	3,200	10,499	Asphalt/concrete

Statistics (2024)
- Passengers: 2,400,000 ▲20.00%
- Aircraft movements: 19,221 ▲29.00%
- Cargo volume (in tonnes): 58,459 ▲32.00%
- Source: CIAC, Portcalls

Clark International Airport (IATA: CRK, ICAO: RPLC), formerly known as Diosdado Macapagal International Airport, is an international airport covering portions of the cities of Angeles and Mabalacat within the Clark Freeport and Special Economic Zone in the province of Pampanga, Philippines. It is located 80 kilometers (50 mi) northwest of Manila. It is accessible by way of the Subic–Clark–Tarlac Expressway.

The airport serves Metro Clark, as well as the entire Central Luzon, Northern Luzon, and, to an extent, Manila metropolitan area and capital city with international and domestic flights. The name is derived from the former American Clark Air Base, which was the largest overseas base of the United States Air Force until it was closed and handed over to the Government of the Philippines in 1991.

The airport has been managed and operated by Luzon International Premier Airport Development (LIPAD) Corp., a consortium of JG Summit Holdings, Filinvest Development Corporation, Philippine Airport Ground Support Solutions Inc., and Changi Airports Philippines Pte. Ltd., following a 2019 turnover by the Department of Transportation and the Bases Conversion and Development Authority. The southern part of the facility is utilized by the Philippine Air Force as Clark Air Base.

The airport was nominated as a finalist for the Airport category of the 2021 Prix Versailles awards but lost to LaGuardia Airport Terminal B in New York as the best new airport of 2021. However, it was recognized as a laureate of Prix Versailles' 2023 list of the World's Most Beautiful Airports.

== History ==
The logo of Clark International Airport, used until 2019

The United States Cavalry established Fort Stotsenberg in 1902 and later converted a portion of it into an airfield, which was, in turn, renamed Clark Air Field in 1919—in honor of aviator Major Harold Melville Clark. Clark Air Field was used as a strategic overseas base by both the United States and Japan during World War II.

In 1947, the RP-US Military Bases Agreement was signed, integrating Clark Air Field and Fort Stotsenberg into Clark Air Base but, after the eruption of Mount Pinatubo in June 1991 and the non-renewal of the military bases agreement, Clark Air Base was reverted to the Philippine government.

The Bases Conversion Development Act of 1992 accelerated the conversion of Clark Air Base into a Special Economic Zone, and, in 2007, the Congress of the Philippines enacted Republic Act No. 9400, which renamed the base to Clark Freeport Philippines. It is now segregated in two separate entities: Clark Freeport Zone, administered by the Clark Development Corporation, and the Clark Civil Aviation Complex, administered by the Clark International Airport Corporation (CIAC).

In 1993, the former Clark Air Base was reopened as the Clark Special Economic Zone (CSEZ) after the area was cleared of lahar debris from the Mount Pinatubo eruption and a typhoon that followed. On April 28, 1994, an executive order was signed by former President Fidel Ramos that designated Clark as the Clark Special Economic Zone as the future site of a premier international airport, aiming to attract economic and tourism activities to Central Luzon and relieve congestion in Metro Manila.

In June, the Bases Conversion and Development Authority (BCDA) signed a memorandum of agreement with the Mitsui of Japan to prepare a master plan for the proposed Clark Field International Airport. The $1 million contract, which included a 15% local counterpart fund, encompassed studies for the airport itself, an access road network, and a railway system connecting Manila to Clark. Months later, Italian-Thai Development submitted a proposal to develop the airport.

During the mid-1990s, the redevelopment was further guided by a master plan commissioned by the BCDA and conducted by Aéroports de Paris (ADP), which envisioned a phased expansion to accommodate long-term traffic growth.

In 1997, the master plan was drafted. The plan would set up a state-of-the-art aviation complex with a capacity of 10 million passengers a day, while the proposal was to have equipment installed, but building the passenger terminal and the control tower has not yet been completed.

The airport opened for commercial operations on June 16, 1996.

On April 4, 2003, President Gloria Macapagal Arroyo renamed the airport to Diosdado Macapagal International Airport (DMIA), in memory of her father, former President Diosdado Macapagal, and ordered the Clark International Airport Corporation (CIAC) in February 2007 to fund the US$1.7 billion (₱76.5 billion) expansion of DMIA and the approval of a US$2 million (₱90 million) study plan financed by the Korean International Cooperation Agency. The first stage of Clark Airport's expansion program, a ₱130 million terminal expansion, was completed in January 2008 to accommodate more than 2 million passengers annually. Prior to that, a Chinese consortium offered a $2 million, foreign-funded feasibility study for a proposed $1.6 billion expansion of the airport. The proposed project sought to update the airport's 2005 master plan, with a vision to build a 300-hectare logistics hub encompassing cargo houses, warehouses, and an extended road network, alongside expanding Terminal 1 and Terminal 2 to increase the airport's capacity to 5 million passengers annually.

The viability and practicability of CIA have been confirmed by studies by Pacific Consultants International in 2005, KOICA in 2008, and Aecom in 2010.

Amid congestion in NAIA due to the policies of the previous administration of President Arroyo, newly-elected President Noynoy Aquino launched the modernization program for the Clark airport. In 2011, Aquino issued EO 64, making the Clark International Airport Corporation (CIAC) an attached agency of the Department of Transportation and Communications (DOTC) to better align it with national aviation strategies. The airport again used the Clark International Airport name in February 2012, while the original passenger terminal continued to bear Macapagal's name until 2014.

In February 2014, Philippine authorities appointed Aéroports de Paris Ingénierie (ADPI), a French aviation engineering firm, to conduct feasibility and development studies for a dedicated low-cost carrier (LCC) terminal. Funded by the French government's FASEP-Etudes development aid fund, the prospective terminal project aimed to support up to 15 million passengers per year, serving to alleviate high air traffic congestion at Manila's Ninoy Aquino International Airport.

President Aquino, as chair of the NEDA board, approved the new ₱15-billion passenger terminal for Clark in 2015. Aquino launched the airport's key planning phases for expanding CRK's capacity to 8 million passengers. When the airport modernization program of Aquino was restarted again, his successor, President Duterte, attended its ribbon-cutting ceremony.

On February 28, 2017, President Rodrigo Duterte issued Executive Order No. 14, reverting CIAC as a subsidiary of the BCDA, but with the Department of Transportation (DOTr) maintaining supervision and operational control of the airport.

During an open bid by the BCDA to take over the operations and maintenance of the airport, the North Luzon Airport Consortium (NLAC), a consortium of JG Summit Holdings, Filinvest Development Corporation, Philippine Airport Ground Support Solutions Inc. and Changi Airports Philippines Pte. Ltd, won. The terminal that was funded by former President Aquino in 2015 was later finished in 2020. Trial flights to and from the new terminal were conducted in December 2021, and the terminal opened for commercial operations on May 2, 2022. All flights moved to the new terminal on the day of its opening. Following the opening of the new terminal, the old terminal was decommissioned. The new Aquino-funded terminal was officially opened by President Bongbong Marcos during a grand opening event on September 28.

=== 2024 rebranding and institutional launch ===
On September 23, 2024, CIAC President Arrey Perez officially launched and rebranded the 2,367-hectare property surrounding the Clark International Airport as the "Clark Aviation Capital of the Philippines" during a general assembly in Clark, Pampanga. The launch established a master strategy to convert historically underutilized public lands into a specialized economic cluster focused on aviation, logistics, commerce, and sustainable urban development.

== Geographical location ==
Clark International Airport is located within the Clark Freeport Zone in the island of Luzon, approximately 98 kilometers (61 mi) from Manila in the south and 163 kilometers (101 mi) from Baguio. The airport lies in between Mount Pinatubo to the west and Mount Arayat to the east.

The airport site is inside the Clark Freeport Zone's Civil Aviation Complex which occupies 2,367 hectares (5,850 acres) and directly linked to the Subic–Clark–Tarlac Expressway (SCTEX) which is connected to the North Luzon Expressway (NLEX) providing a direct link to Metro Manila.

It has a local catchment area with an estimated population of 23 million covering the Ilocos Region, Cagayan Valley, Central Luzon, the Cordillera Administrative Region, and northern Metro Manila.

== Structure ==
=== Passenger terminal ===
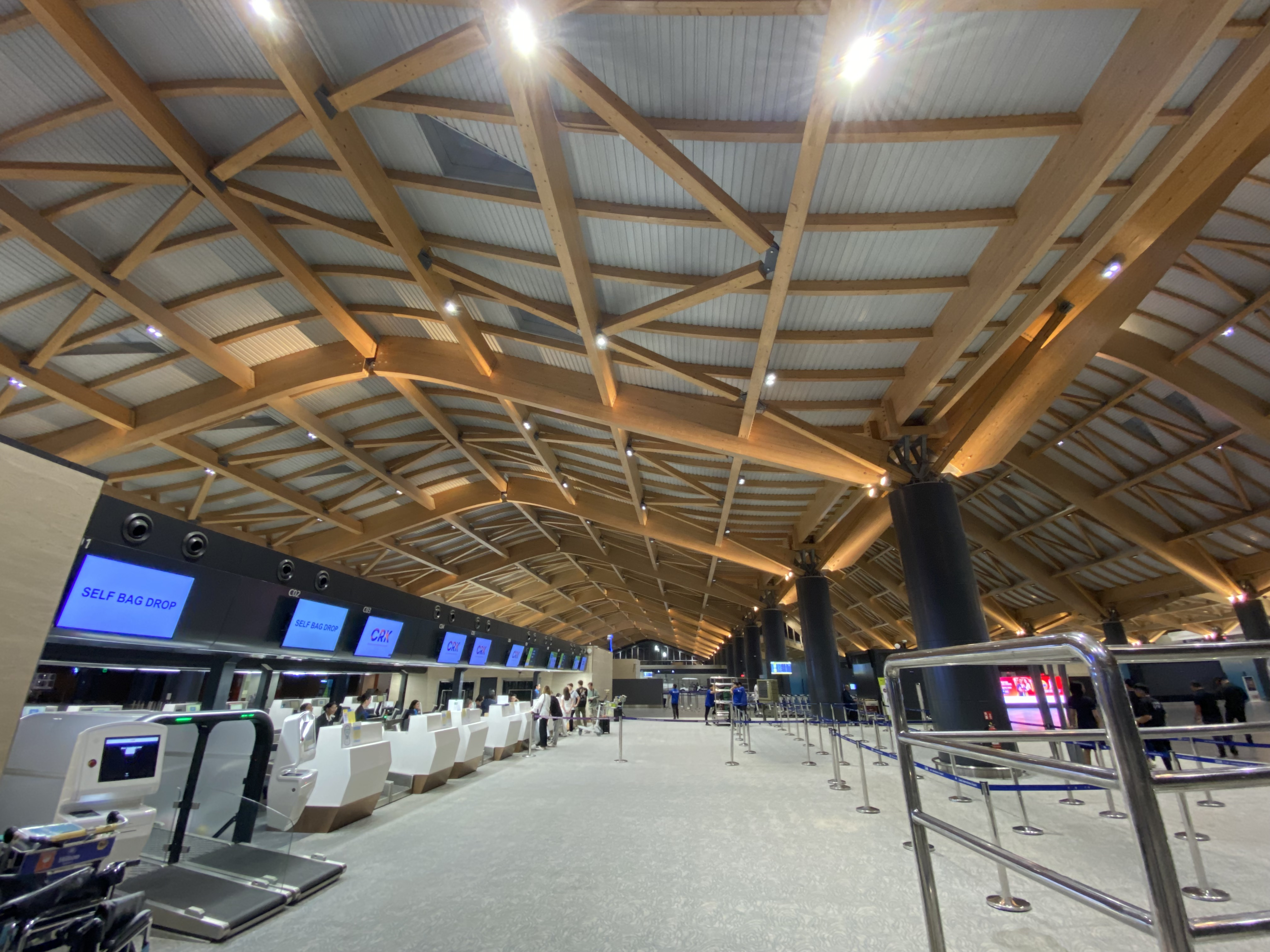
Departure hall

Arrival hall

The airport has a 82,600-square-meter (889,000 sq ft) four-level passenger terminal building which replaced the original terminal in 2022. Designed by Populous and Casas+Architects and constructed by Megawide Construction Corporation and GMR Infrastructure, the terminal has a total floor area of 110,000 square meters (1,200,000 sq ft) and a design capacity of twelve million passengers per annum.

The ground level holds the baggage claim and arrival halls, while the second floor holds the transfer facilities, immigration facilities for arriving international passengers, and 18 jet bridges. Aside from the jet bridges, there are remote gates at the apron. The third level houses the check-in counters and pre-departure areas including gate lounges, while the fourth level houses food and beverage areas and commercially important person lounges.

The facade of the terminal sports a wave roof design inspired by the mountains of Mount Arayat, Mount Pinatubo, and the Sierra Madre mountain range.

==== Former terminal ====

Views of the departure hall of the former passenger terminal in 2013

The original terminal was expanded for US$3 million (PH₱130 million) to accommodate 1 million passengers annually. The expansion project was inaugurated in April 2008 to serve the growing passenger volume due to the entry of foreign and local budget carriers at the airport.

The first phase of the expansion of the terminal started in April 2010 at a cost of $12 million (₱550 million), saw a second story, arrival and departure lounges, and two aerobridges added to the terminal building. The expansion boosted the airport's capacity to 2.5 million annually.

The passenger terminal was expanded again in 2013 at a cost of $9.6 million (₱417 million), increasing the capacity of the terminal from 2.5 million to 4.2 million passengers per annum. The expansion increased the size of the passenger terminal building from 11,439 square meters (123,130 sq ft) to 19,799 square meters (213,110 sq ft). It added 21 new check-in counters, increasing the total number of counters from 13 to 34. Five arrival counters and 12 departures counters were also constructed. The expanded terminal has eight entry points and three customs stations. The modernized terminal started operations in May 2013.

=== Runways ===
Clark International Airport used to have two 3,200-meter (10,500 ft) parallel runways. Since the runways are closely spaced, the secondary runway (02L/20R) has been decommissioned and is no longer in use. The new terminal occupies the end that was formerly Runway 20R, while a new maintenance hangar is currently being constructed on the stopway of Runway 02L.

In April 2026, the Bases Conversion and Development Authority awarded an engineering design contract for a planned second runway to a joint venture of Schema Konsult Inc. and Yooshin Engineering Corp. worth ₱206.9 million (US$4.2 million). The design phase is expected to be completed in the second quarter of 2027, after which a separate construction bidding process is planned; the runway is targeted to become operational by the fourth quarter of 2029. The additional runway is intended to provide backup capacity for the existing runway during maintenance or operational disruptions.

- The primary runway (Runway 02R/20L) has a length of 3,200 meters (10,500 ft) and a width of 60 meters (200 ft). It is equipped with various navigational aids and lighting facilities, and it has a Category 1 rating for precision approach.
- The former secondary runway (Runway 02L/20R) has the same length as the primary runway but is only 45 meters (148 ft) wide, 15 meters (49 ft) narrower than the primary runway. Unlike the primary runway, the secondary runway was used for visual flight rules (VFR) only. The secondary runway was decommissioned in 2017.

=== Air traffic control tower ===
In 2020, the Clark International Airport Corporation (CIAC) announced plans to construct the tallest air traffic control tower in the Philippines which will stand around 54 meters (177 ft) in height. The tower was projected to be complete by December 2021. However, the project is only 61 percent complete as of December 2023 due to design issues and pending approval from the Civil Aviation Authority of the Philippines and the Clark Development Corporation.

=== Second hangar ===
On March 12, 2024, Lufthansa Technik Philippines president Elmar Lutter announced the groundbreaking project of an ₱8.4-billion (US$150-million) hangar facility at Clark International Airport, the airport's second hangar. The planned hangar was unveiled during President Bongbong Marcos' visit to Germany.

== Airlines and destinations ==
=== Passenger ===
Airlines	Destinations
Aero K	Cheongju
Asiana Airlines	Seoul–Incheon
Cebgo	Busuanga, El Nido, Masbate, Naga, Siargao
Cebu Pacific	Bangkok–Suvarnabhumi, Caticlan, Cebu, Davao, Hanoi, Hong Kong, Iloilo, Puerto Princesa, Singapore, Tagbilaran, Tokyo–Narita
Emirates	Dubai–International
EVA Air	Taipei–Taoyuan
HK Express	Hong Kong
Jeju Air	Seoul–Incheon
Jin Air	Busan, Seoul–Incheon
PAL Express	Basco, Busuanga
Qatar Airways	Doha
Scoot	Singapore
Starlux Airlines	Taipei–Taoyuan
Sunlight Air	Busuanga, Caticlan, Siargao, Tablas
VietJet Air	Ho Chi Minh City

=== Cargo ===
Airlines	Destinations
China Postal Airlines	Fuzhou, Guangzhou, Quanzhou, Yiwu
FedEx Express	Osaka–Kansai, Seoul–Incheon, Singapore
Jiangsu Jingdong Cargo Airlines	Zhuhai
Royal Air Philippines	Haikou, Nanjing, Nanning
Shandong Airlines	Shenzhen
Skyway Airlines	Cagayan de Oro, Davao, Hong Kong, Shenzhen
Tianjin Air Cargo	Zhengzhou
UPS Airlines	Bengaluru, Cologne/Bonn, Hong Kong, Osaka–Kansai, Seoul–Incheon, Shanghai–Pudong, Shenzhen, Singapore, Taipei–Taoyuan, Tokyo–Narita

== Statistics ==
Data from Clark International Airport Corporation (CIAC).

Year	Passenger movements				Aircraft movements				Cargo movements (in tonnes)			
Year	Domestic	International	Total	% change	Domestic	International	Total	% change	Domestic	International	Total	% change
2004	9,442	49,546	58,988	—N/a	432	230	662	—N/a	No data provided			—N/a
2005	7,816	224,497	232,313	▲293.83	455	1,188	1,643	▲148.19	No data provided			—N/a
2006	17,889	470,867	488,756	▲110.39	437	2,065	2,502	▲52.28	3,774	124,981	128,755	—N/a
2007	43,650	489,969	533,619	▲9.18	621	1,975	2,596	▲3.51	3,533	125,124	128,657	▼0.08
2008	39,681	490,748	530,429	▼0.60	584	2,039	2,623	▲1.04	2,780	127,805	130,585	▲1.50
2009	30,732	559,792	590,524	▲11.33	572	2,613	3,185	▲21.43	No data provided (Note: Only the combined international and domestic cargo volume is provided.)		132,078	▲1.14
2010	46,525	607,704	654,229	▲10.79	379	2,672	3,051	▼4.21	No data provided			—N/a
2011	42,118	725,023	767,141	▲17.26	609	6,971	7,580	▲148.44	No data provided			—N/a
2012	300,438	1,015,319	1,315,757	▲71.51	3,501	9,313	12,814	▲69.05	No data provided			—N/a
2013	215,173	985,419	1,200,592	▼8.75	1,916	8,420	10,336	▼19.34	No data provided			—N/a
2014	90,948	786,809	877,757	▼23.89	936	5,715	6,651	▼35.65	1,280	46,702	47,982	—N/a
2015	41,824	826,704	868,528	▼1.05	348	5,709	6,057	▼8.93	2,217	32,796	35,013	▼37.04
2016	51,625	899,382	951,007	▲9.50	360	5,852	6,212	▲2.56	2,120	13,236	15,356	▼56.14
2017	431,343	1,083,188	1,514,531	▲59.26	5,399	7,221	12,620	▲103.16	2,789	13,656	16,445	▲7.09
2018	1,350,168	1,314,210	2,664,378	▲75.92	16,267	8,650	24,873	▲97.09	2,875	15,342	18,217	▲10.78
2019	1,780,000	2,200,000	4,000,211	▲50.14	23,856	11,882	35,738	▲43.68	11,055	15,267	26,322	▲44.49
2020	508,795	432,773	941,532	▼76.46	5,591	3,329	8,920	▼75.04	No data provided		31,800	▲20.81
2021	9,405	131,997	192,542	▼79.55	234	971	2,386	▼73.25	No data provided		36,975	▲16.27
2022	140,248	628,578	768,826	▲299.30	1,526	4,138	5,664	▲137.39	No data provided		49,254	▲33.21
2023	No data provided		1,999,542	▲160.08	No data provided		14,327	▲152.95	No data provided		43,437	▼11.81
2024	No data provided		2,404,888	▲16.86	No data provided		19,222	▲34.17	No data provided		58,496	▲34.67

== Awards ==
- Center for Asia Pacific Aviation
  - Low-Cost Airport of the Year (2006)
- Frost & Sullivan Asia Pacific Aerospace and Defense Awards
  - Airport of the Year (2008) (airports under 15 million passengers)
- Routes Airport Marketing Awards
  - Winner (2013) (airports under 20 million passengers)
- Prix Versailles
  - Laureate, World's Most Beautiful Airports (2023)

== Ground transportation ==
=== Motor vehicle ===
The Subic–Clark–Tarlac Expressway (SCTEx) provides high-speed automobile access to the airport, with two exits: Clark North and Clark South interchange. Passengers with connecting flights at Ninoy Aquino International Airport in Metro Manila can either pay a toll to use Skyway, from North Luzon Expressway (NLEX), to NAIA Expressway connecting NAIA Terminals 1, 2 and 3 since December 29, 2020, or take NLEX which is linked via SCTEX, then passing through Epifanio de los Santos Avenue from Balintawak, Quezon City to Roxas Boulevard in Pasay, Roxas Boulevard from EDSA to the northern terminus of Manila–Cavite Expressway (CAVITEX) in Parañaque, and finally onto NAIA Road.

Off-airport car park services similar to Park 'N Fly are provided as well.

=== Public transportation ===
For short-distance routes, air-conditioned jeepneys connect Clark to nearby Dau Bus Terminal in Mabalacat and SM City Clark in Angeles City, the latter of which offers in-town check-in services to passengers. From Dau, passengers can ride intercity buses leading to other cities and towns in Northern and Central Luzon as well as Metro Manila. Direct Premium Point-to-Point Bus Services (P2Ps) for long-distance routes are provided by four bus companies leading to Ninoy Aquino International Airport, TriNoma, and Robinsons Galleria in Metro Manila, Subic and Olongapo in Zambales, Dagupan in Pangasinan, and Vigan in Ilocos Sur.

The airport will also be directly served by the Clark International Airport station of the North–South Commuter Railway, connecting the airport to the New Clark City in Capas, Tarlac, as well as Tutuban in Manila and Calamba in Laguna. The railway is scheduled to be completed by sometime in 2027.

== See also ==
- History of Clark Air Base
- New Manila International Airport
- Ninoy Aquino International Airport
- Sangley Point Airport
