= Colonel Ernesto Rabina Air Base =

Military training area in Tarlac, Philippines

Colonel Ernesto Ravina Air Base
- Camp O'Donnell, Tarlac Colonel Ernesto Ravina Air Base (Philippines)

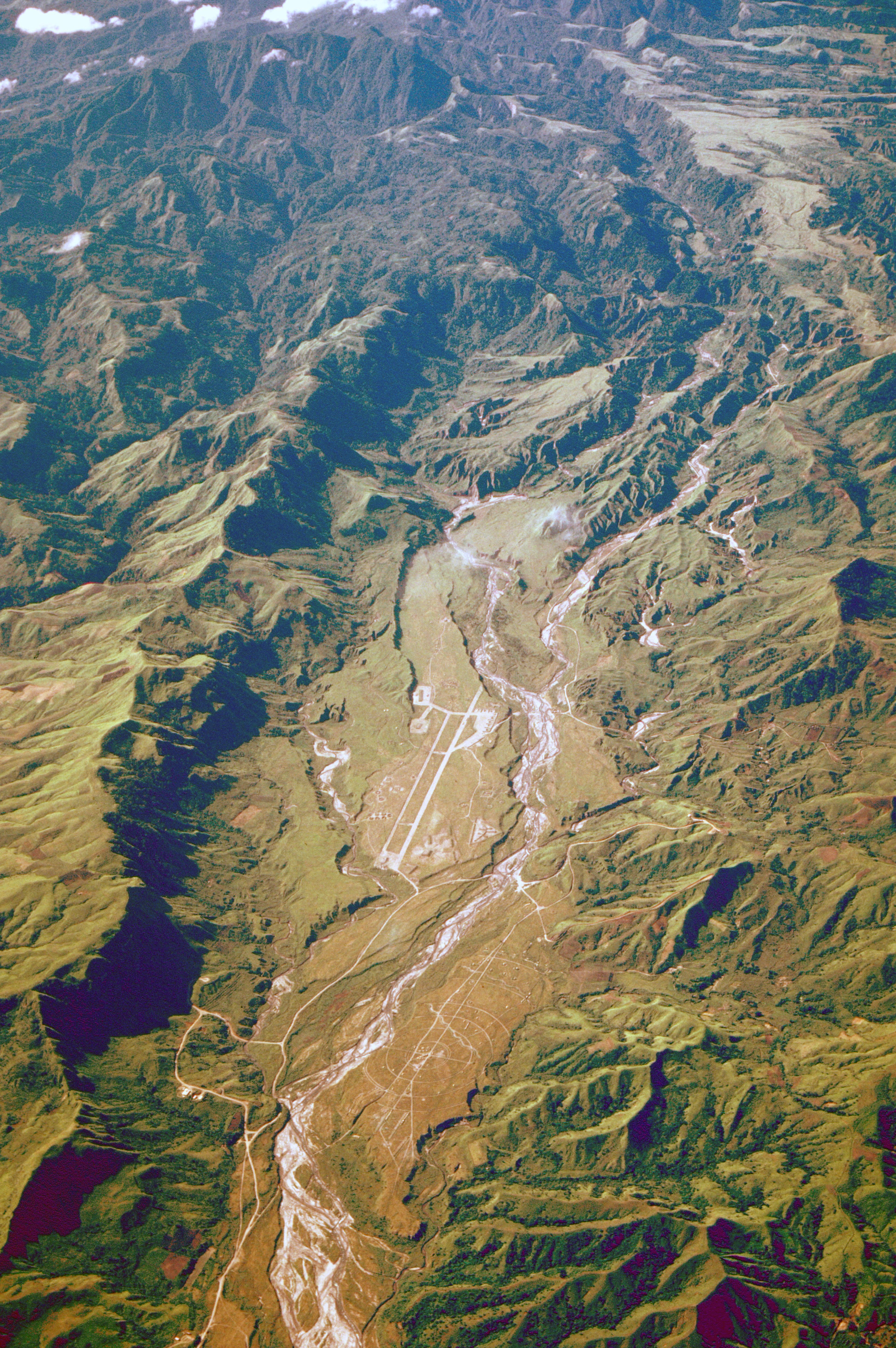
- An aerial view of the mock airfield at Crow Valley

Site information
- Type: Bombing range
- Controlled by: Armed Forces of the Philippines

Location
- Coordinates: 15°15′28″N 120°22′30″E

Colonel Ernesto Ravina Air Base (CERAB) (ICAO: RPLQ) or Crow Valley Gunnery Range, and formerly the Tarlac Military Testing Ground, was the main bombing range of the United States Armed Forces in the western Pacific, and by the Armed Forces of the Philippines. It is located in Camp O'Donnell in Tarlac, Philippines. The 68-kilometre (42 mi) facility is located approximately 22 kilometres (14 mi) from Clark Air Base and is primarily used for aerial combat training, which include bombing and strafing practice, as well as ground unit maneuver and live fire exercises.

== History ==
Colonel Ernesto Ravina Air Base was a component facility of Clark Air Base during the American presence in the Philippines as the Crow Valley Gunnery Range. The facility was used extensively by the US 13th Air Force. It came to prominence during Cope Thunder exercises by forces from the Philippines, Canada, United Kingdom, Japan, New Zealand, Australia, Thailand and the Republic of Singapore during the 1970s.

Security at Crow Valley was the responsibility of the Security Police assigned to the 3rd Tactical Electronic Warfare Training Squadron (3rd TEWTS) based at Camp O'Donnell and combined Air Force Security Policemen and local DoD Civilian Guards.

Crow Valley was home to the 6009th Security Police Training Squadron (SPTS). While headquartered at Clark Air Base as an attached unit of the 3rd Security Police Group, the 6009th SPTS was responsible for conducting Air Base Ground Defense (ABGD) Training at their facility at Crow Valley. This training program was known in the Air Force as "Commando Warrior." Security Police units from throughout Asia and the Pacific would come to Crow Valley for two weeks of intense jungle warfare style training focused on the techniques necessary to protect an air base in a foreign country (aka The Republic of Gunderstand). This training facility was also the site of the Air Force Office of Special Investigations' "Commando Crow" program, training agents in tactical counterintelligence. These programs were active at this location throughout the 1980s.

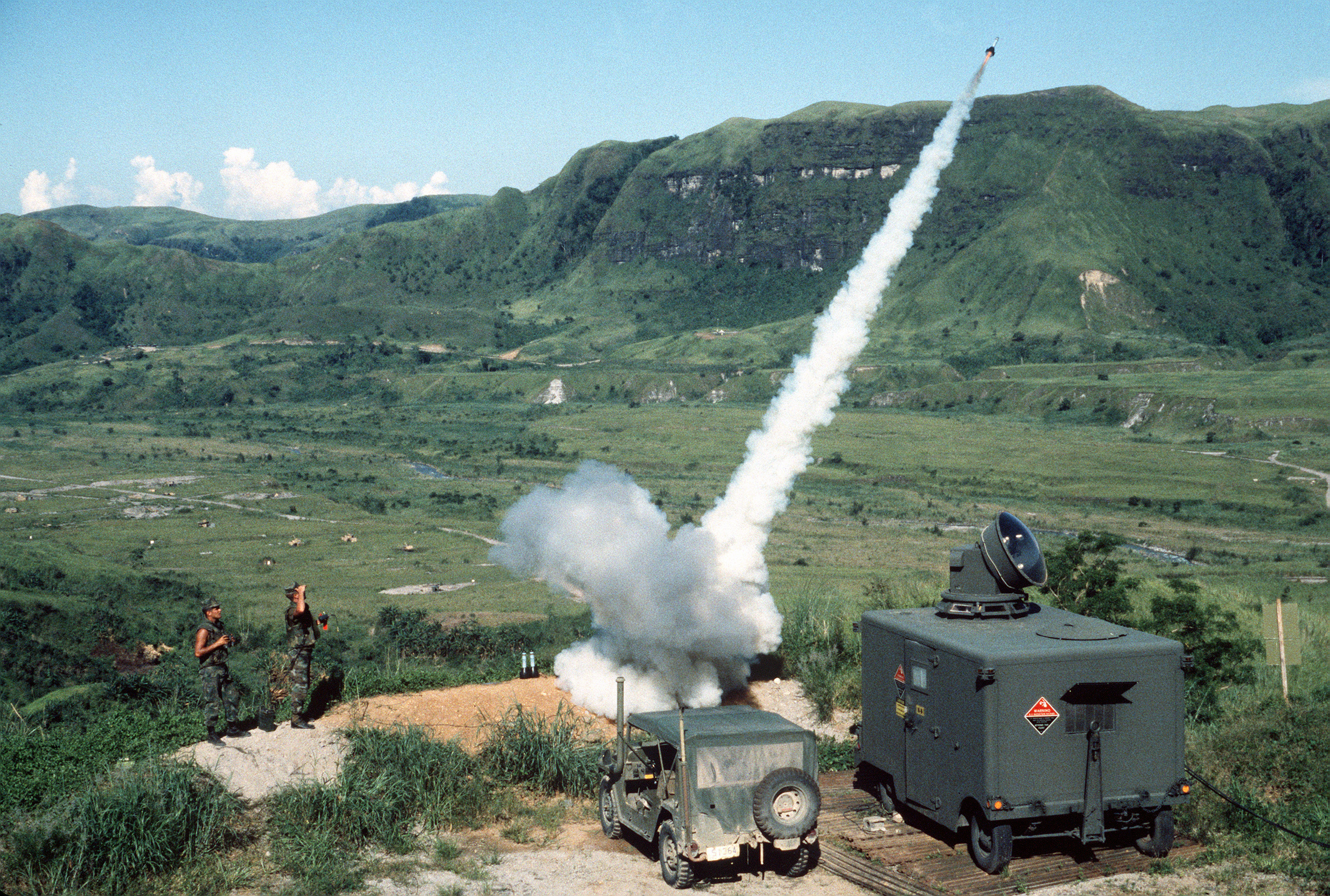
US Marines launch a Smokey Sam simulated SAM, 1984.

The 1961st Communications Group, Operating Location Delta (OL-D) was responsible for communications support on the range. This included 4 MRC-108 Communication Jeeps, Air Traffic Control radios at Alpha Control on Camp O'Donnell and sights downrange including the Crow Valley Control Tower. Also maintained were the Strafe Scoring System and the Laser Target Designator Scoring System (LTDSS) located on the range and remoted to the Crow Valley Control Tower.

The Philippine Air Force renamed the facility to Colonel Ernesto Rabina Air Base (CERAB) during a formal ceremony conducted on September 28, 2016. The CVGR was renamed to CERAB in honor of the achievement of then Colonel Ernesto P Ravina PAF during the siege of the Sulu Air Task Group (SATAG) in Jolo, Sulu way back in 1974 that earned him the Distinguished Conduct Star (DCS) award.

== Description ==
The 17,814-hectare facility featured an airfield as well as sophisticated electronic warfare installations, including advanced radar and radar jamming equipment and even a Russian surface-to-air missile installation. However, these facilities have been buried by pyroclastic flows during the 1991 Pinatubo explosion, and lahar thereafter.

The facility no longer has any of the aforementioned features as this was buried by the ashfall. There is a small circular bullseye in the wash that is nearly invisible from medium altitude bombing.

== Current status ==
At present, the facility is used by the Armed Forces of the Philippines as a weapons testing ground, bombing and artillery range, ordinance disposal, as well as military reservation. Crow Valley is also at times called the Tarlac Military Testing Ground. Civilian access is limited, and serves as the jump off point for trails going to Mount Pinatubo when not in use.

Since 2002, the Philippine Air Force has taken control of the area for their bombing range. The base also host the PAF's special operations unit 710th Special Operations Wing.

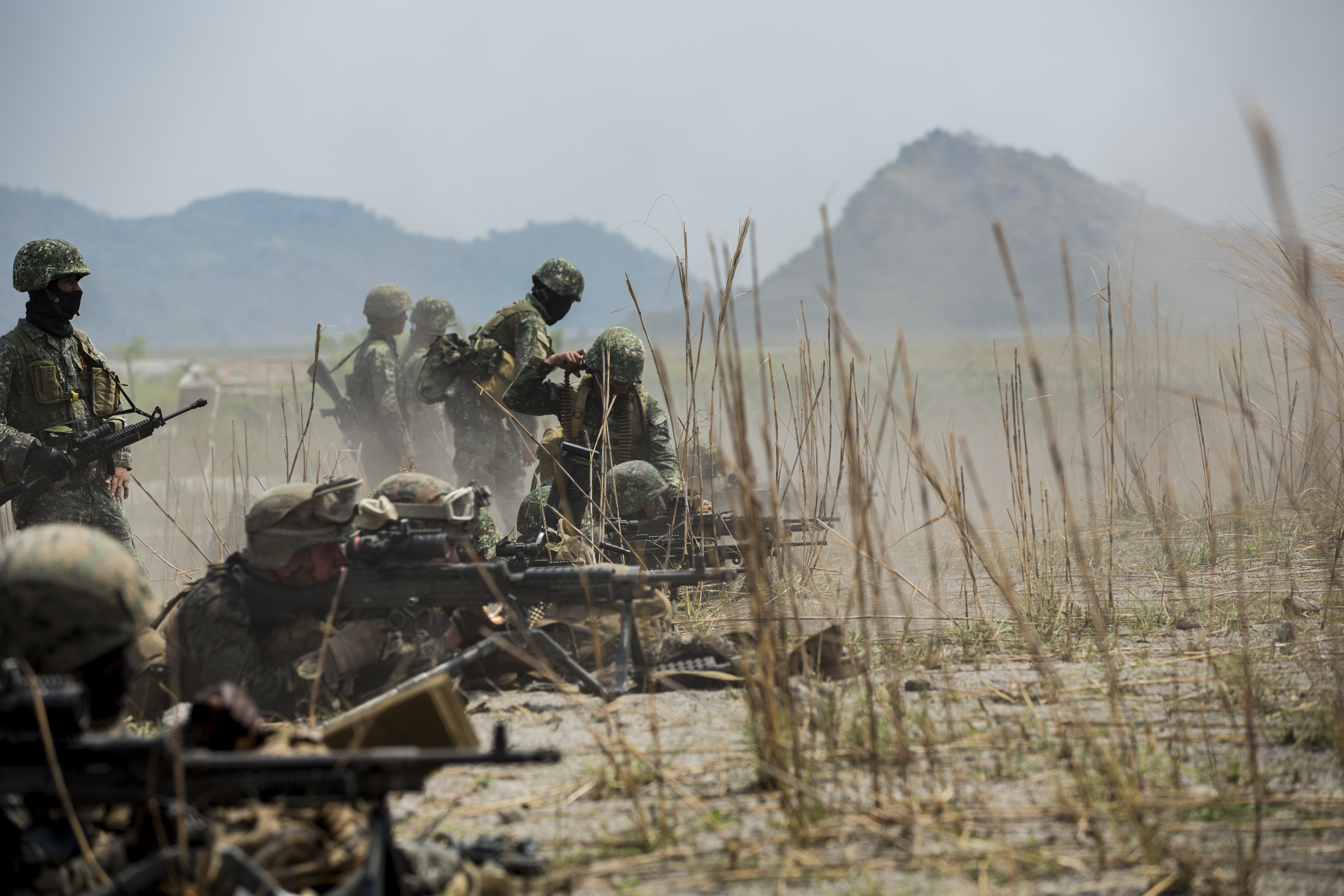
US and Philippine Marines conducting live fire exercises.

In recent news, Crow Valley was also laid claim by some 508 Aeta families as ancestral domain. The Department of National Defense has rejected the claim. After the 1991 Pinatubo explosion, and the turn over of the US military facilities, Pres. Fidel Ramos announced Proclamation No. 163 (1993) where Crow Valley was specifically exempted from the coverage of the Bases Conversion Development Authority (BCDA), and is primarily reserved for the use of the Armed Forces and the Defense Department. Given that the valley has no human settlements and has been inundated by lahar, the AFP has retained the location for its live fire exercises and bombing range.

Aside from the Aeta ancestral claims, there have been attempts in 2018 by individuals to settle in the area but the Department of National Defense has removed them. The official statement from the department is no civilian structure will be allowed in the vicinity of the base.

Crow Valley not only serves the needs of the Philippine Armed Forces, but also hosts as one of the venues of the Balikatan Joint Military Exercises between the US and other allies.

== See also ==
- Clark Air Base
- Fort Magsaysay
