= GTR-18 Smokey Sam =

GTR-18
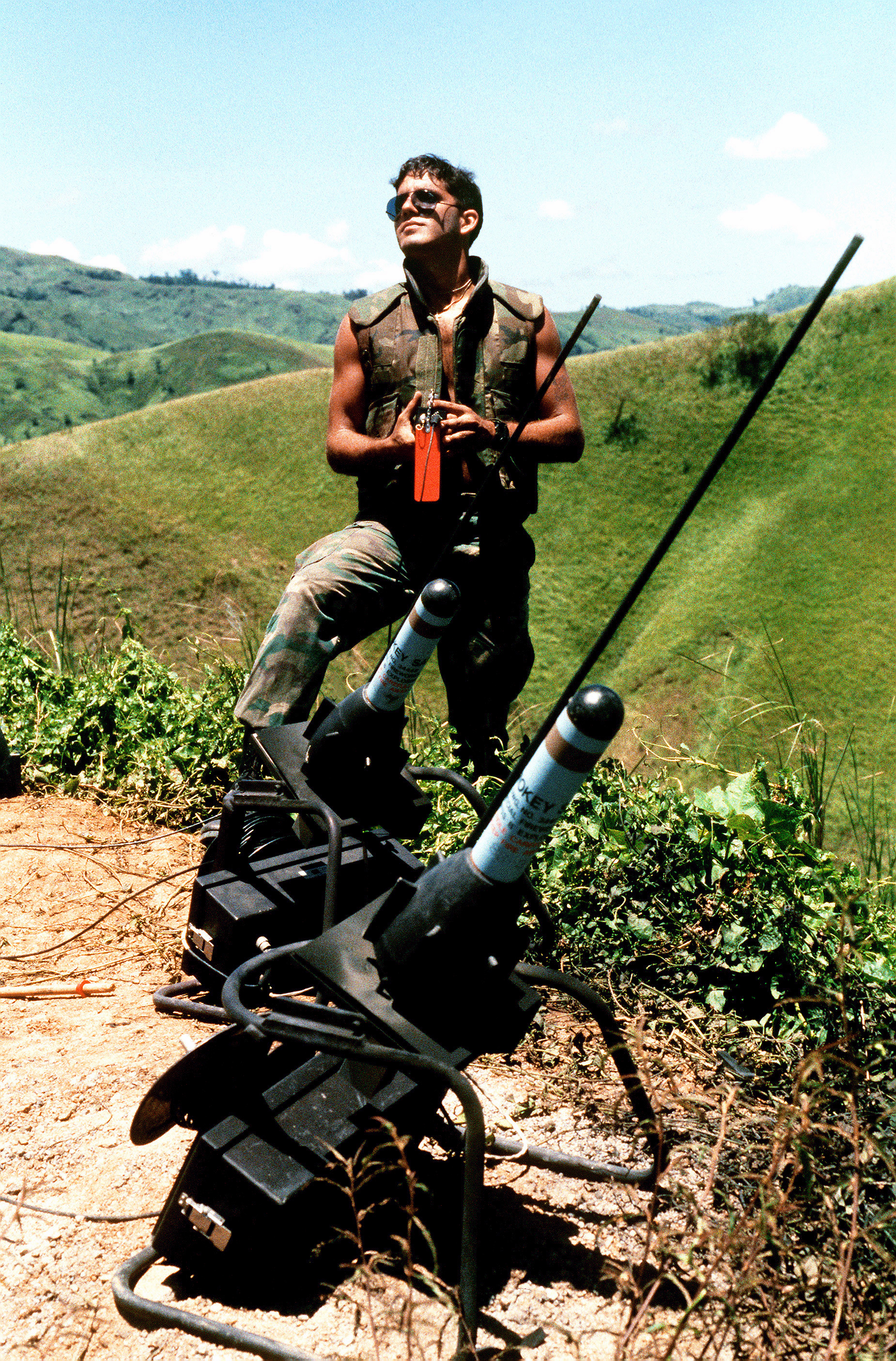
- Two GTR-18 "Smokey Sams" on LMU-23/E single-bay launchers
- Type: SAM simulator rocket
- Place of origin: United States

Service history
- In service: 1980s-present
- Used by: United States military

Production history
- Designer: Naval Air Warfare Center Weapons Division (NAWCWD)
- Designed: early 1980s

Specifications
- Mass: 1.430 pounds (649 g)
- Length: 15.5 inches (394 mm)
- Diameter: 2 inches (51 mm)
- Wingspan: 6.0 inches (152 mm)
- Engine: Solid fuel rocket 15 lbf (6.80 kgf) (66.72 N) of thrust
- Propellant: 499 grams (17.6 oz) X-60
- Flight ceiling: 1,800 feet (550 m) to 2,000 feet (610 m)
- Boost time: 6 seconds at 70°
- Maximum speed: 165 m/s (540 ft/s)
- Guidance system: None
- Steering system: None
- Launch platform: single-bay LMU-23/E or four-bay LMU-24/E

The GTR-18A, commonly known as the Smokey Sam, is a small unguided rocket developed by Naval Air Warfare Center Weapons Division (NAWCWD) in China Lake, California as a threat simulator for use during military exercises. Widely used in training, the Smokey Sam remains in operational service with the United States military.

== Design and development ==
The GTR-18 was conceived in the late 1970s by Robert A. McLellan, a Weapons Range Scientist working with Exercise Red Flag at Nellis Air Force Base. He first searched for a commercially available system that would perform as he envisioned. It quickly became apparent that no commercial product would perform adequately, so the development of the GTR-18 was undertaken by the Naval Weapons Center (NWC) during the early 1980s, with the intent of developing Mr. McLellan's idea of a simple and inexpensive rocket for visually simulating the launch of surface-to-air missiles (SAMs) during training exercises.

The design of the GTR-18A rocket is very simplistic and intended for minimal cost with the fuselage and nose cone being constructed from phenolic paper while the fins are constructed out of styrofoam. The fuselage and fins are joined to the nose cone by the motor tube which contains 499 grams (17.6 oz) of X-60 solid fuel propellant. Because of its very light construction, the Smokey Sam will only cause minimal damage even if it accidentally strikes a low-flying aircraft.

== Operational history ==
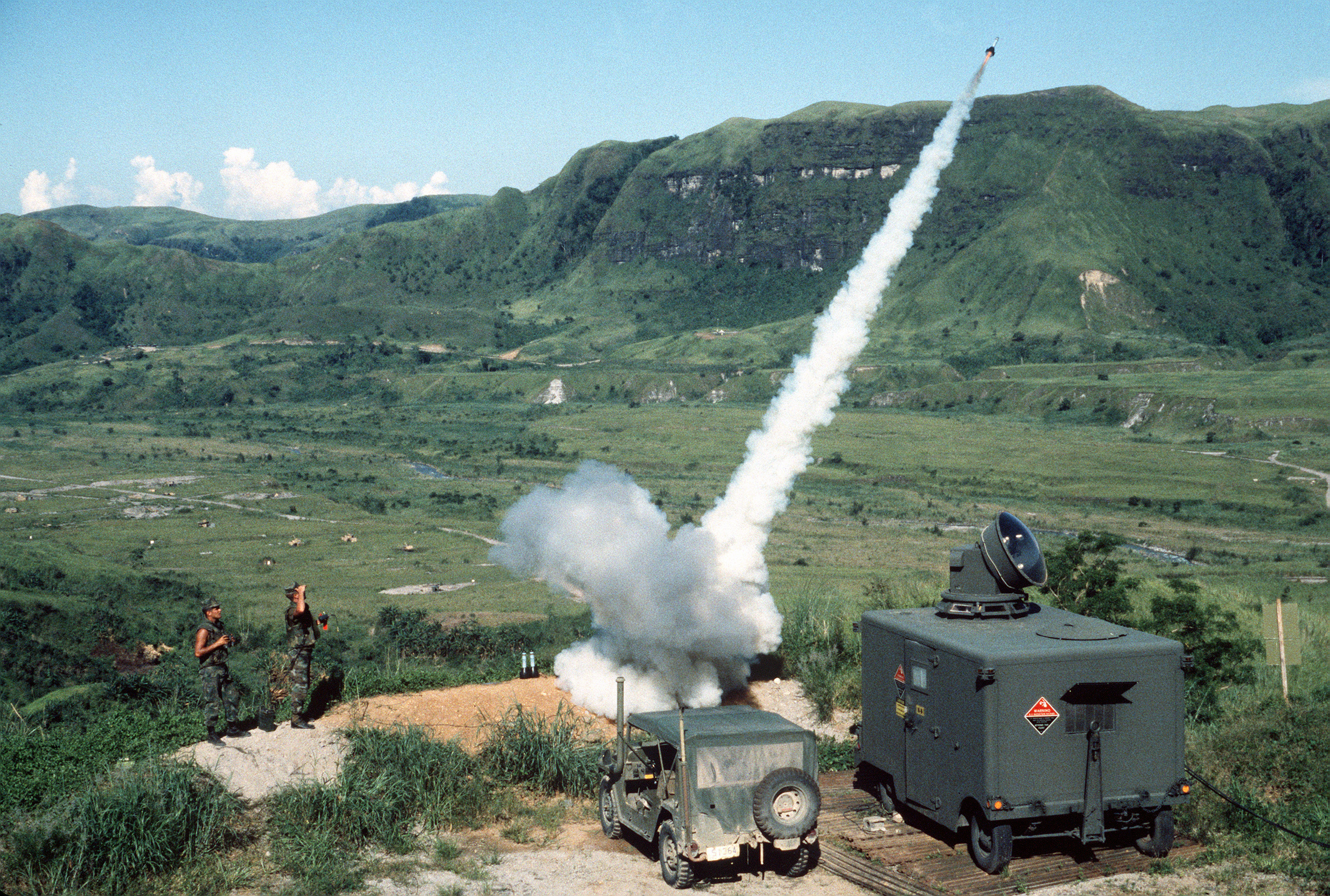
A GTR-18 is launched at the Crow Valley Range Complex, Philippines, 1984.

The complete launch system, known as the Smokey Sam Simulator, includes single-rail LMU-23/E and four-rail LMU-24/E launching pads, an AN/VPQ-1 radar set, the PVU-3A/E Igniter and the GTR-18A rockets themselves, making up the SMU-124/E system as a whole.

When launched, the GTR-18's rocket motor produces a distinctive white plume, providing a realistic simulation of the launch of a surface-to-air missile. While the ordinary GTR-18A has a simple, model rocket type motor, an improved "Dual Thrust Smokey Sam" tested in the early 2000s featured a modified rocket motor, providing a 1.5 second boost period, followed by a lower-thrust sustainer burn with burnout occurring at 7.1 seconds after launch.

This motor was altered to use a two-part laminated grain propellant which utilized both the standard zinc based grain and a high thrust aluminium based grain as used by other US rockets. The new propellant allows the "Dual Thrust Smokey Sam" to have a boost and sustain signature to better imitate a surface-to-air missile and while thrust is initially low, the higher thrust for the majority of the motors burn time gives an improved trajectory.

The Smokey Sam remains in production and operational service, and is extensively used by the U.S. military.

== Gallery ==
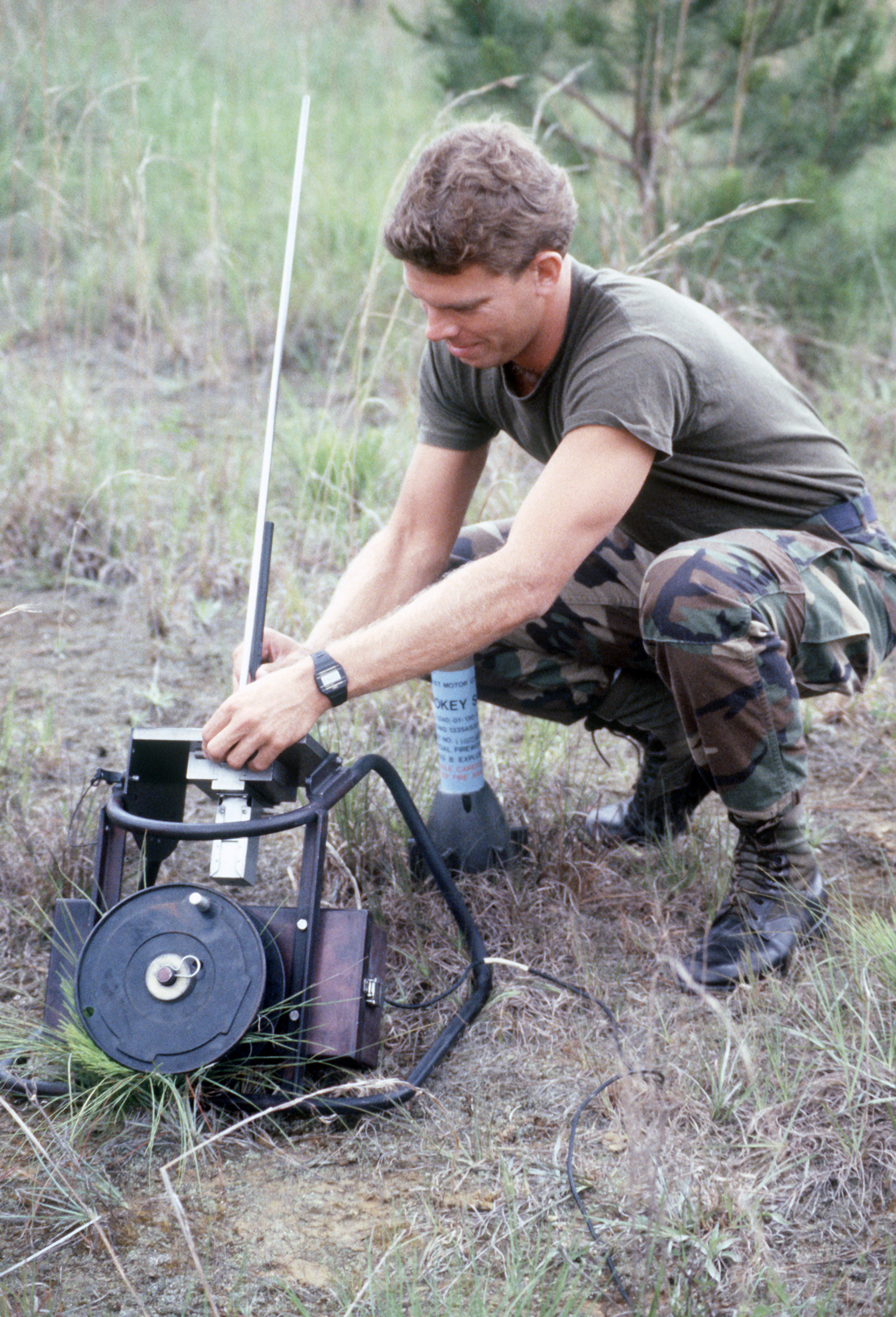
A GTR-18A Smokey Sam being set up during Exercise PATRIOT PEACH '86

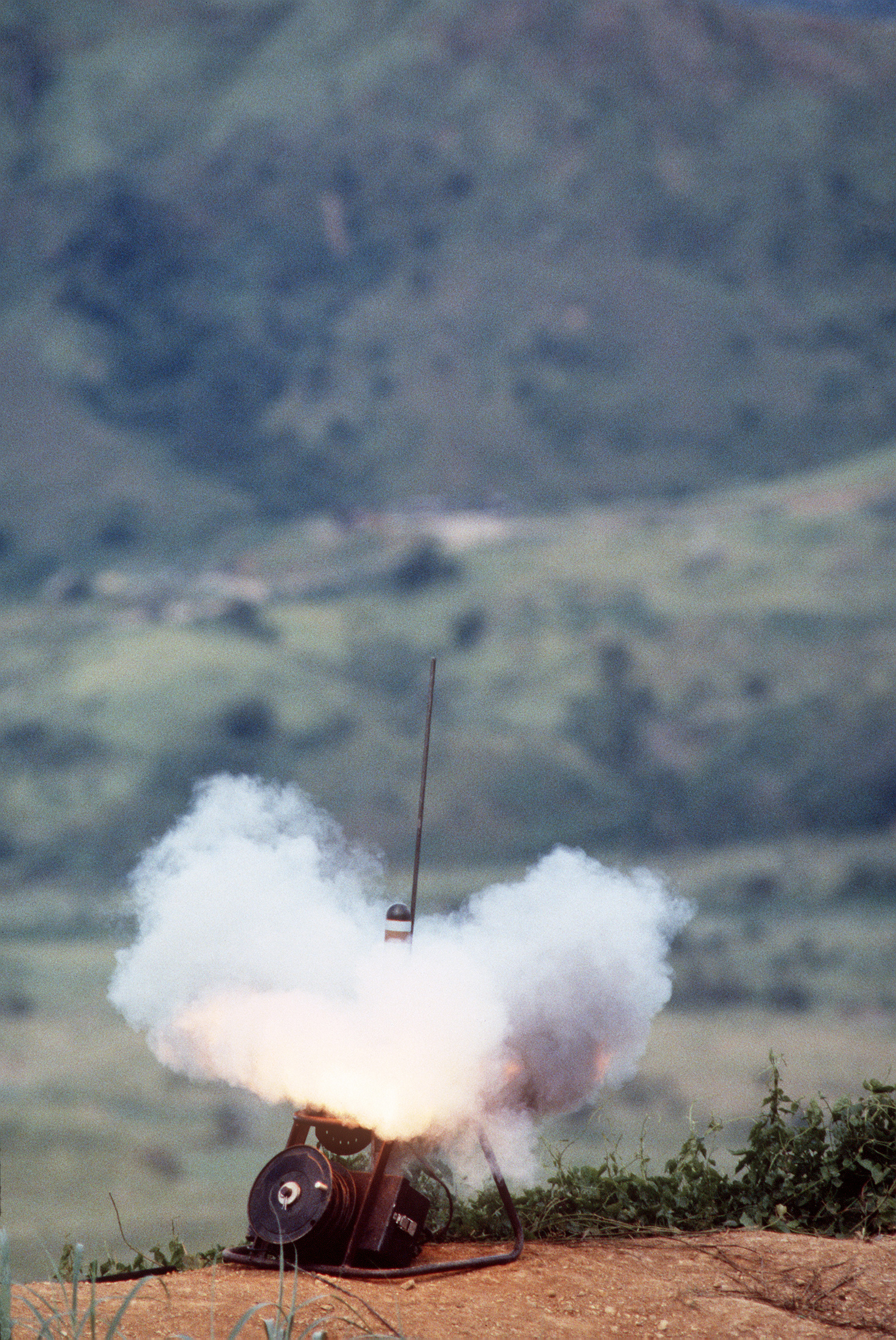
A Smokey Sam being launched at an aircraft approaching the Crow Valley Electronic Warfare Tactical Range, Luzon, Philippines, during exercise "Cope Thunder '84-7"

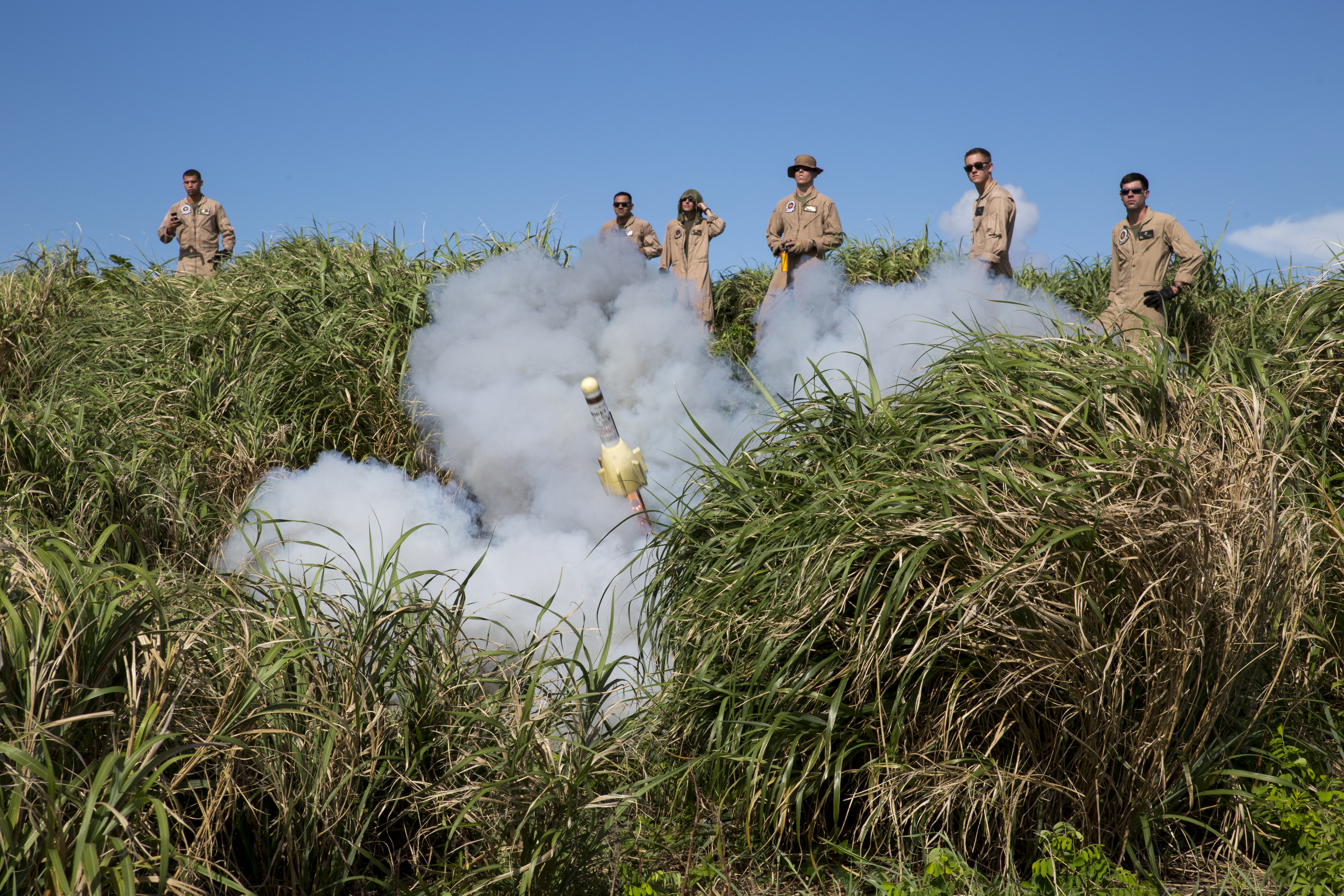
Ordnancemen of VMGR-152 aim a Smokey Sam at pilots during threat reaction training

== Notes ==
=== Bibliography ===
- Kitfield, James (1995). Prodigal Soldiers: How the Generation of Officers Born of Vietnam Revolutionzed the American Style of War. New York: Simon & Schuster. ISBN 0-671-76925-1.
- Parsch, Andreas (2002). "NWC GTR-18 Smokey Sam". Directory of U.S. Military Rockets and Missiles. designation-systems.net.
- Taylor, Bill (9 March 2006). "Dual Thrust Modified Smokey Sam for Low Cost Testing and Simulation" (PDF). NDIA 22nd National Test & Evaluation Conference. Sensor Directorate, Air Force Research Laboratory. Archived from the original (PDF) on 7 October 2012.

=== External links ===
- Webpage covering the GTR-18A

==== Military specifications ====
- GTR-18A
- SMU-124/E
