= Harold M. Clark =

United States Army Signal Corps officer (1890–1919)

Harold Melville Clark
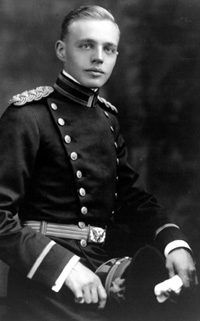
- Born: October 4, 1890; Saint Paul, Minnesota, United States
- Died: May 2, 1919 (aged 28) off Miraflores Locks, Panama
- Burial place: Arlington National Cemetery, Virginia, United States; 38°52′37″N 77°04′15″W
- Military career
- Allegiance: United States
- Branch: Signal Corps, United States Army
- Rank: Major

Harold Melville Clark (October 4, 1890 – May 2, 1919) was a major in U.S. Army Signal Corps. Born in St. Paul, Minnesota, Clark lived in Manila, Philippines, from 1904 when his father moved there for business until 1910 when he graduated high school. Clark was commissioned a second lieutenant of Cavalry in 1913. In 1916, he transferred to the Aviation Section of the Signal Corps (the Signal Corps was the first to act on a strategic vision for aviation services in the United States Armed Forces, funding the research of the Wright Brothers in 1903), and in 1917 was rated a Junior Military Aviator.

Clark flew assignments in Columbus, New Mexico; Kelly Field, Texas; and Fort Sill, Oklahoma. He went to Hawaii in 1917 to command an air service station and completed the first inter-island flight ever made in the Hawaiian Islands. Upon his return to the United States, Clark served at fields in Washington, D.C., and San Diego, California. After completion of a pursuit course, he was appointed as the commanding officer of a pursuit group of the First Provisional Wing at Mineola, New York. Clark later became an executive officer with the Aviation Section in Panama.

He died on May 2, 1919, in a seaplane crash in the Miraflores Locks, Panama Canal Zone and is interred at Arlington National Cemetery.

Clark Air Base, Clark International Airport, and New Clark City in the Philippines are named after Clark.
