= Clark Air Base =

Philippine Air Force base in Luzon

- Part of the United States Air Force and Philippine Air Force
- Located at the Clark Freeport Zone, Philippines
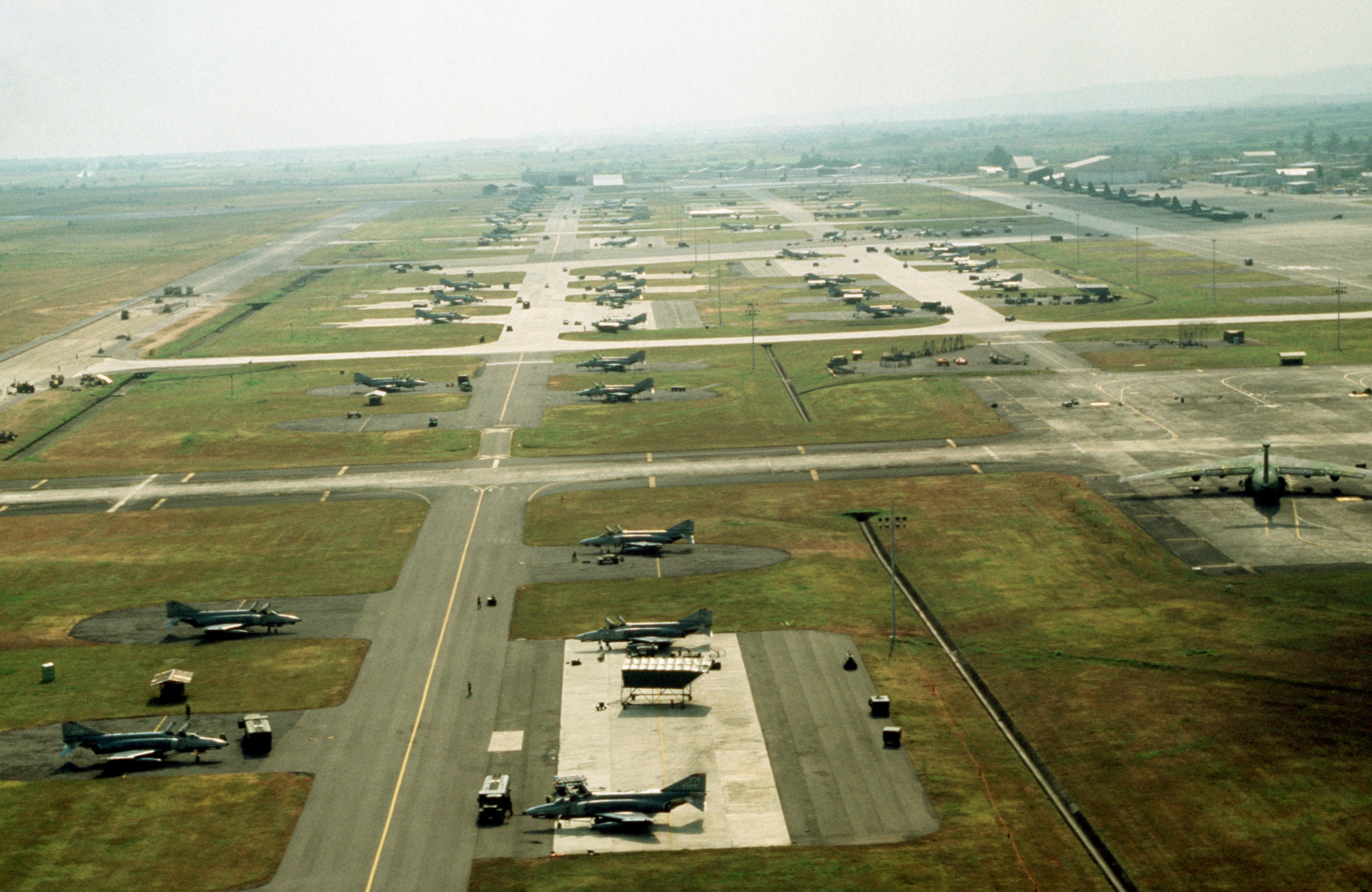
- Clark Air Base in 1989 as part of United States Pacific Air Forces

Site information
- Type: Air base
- Owner: Philippines
- Controlled by: Philippine Air Force
- Condition: Renovated

Location
- Coordinates: 15°11′09″N 120°33′35″E

Site history
- Built: September 1, 1903
- Built by: United States
- In use: United States; 1903–1942; Japan; 1942–1945; United States; 1945–1991; Philippines; 1991–present

Garrison information
- Garrison: 1st Air Division; 410th Maintenance Wing; 420th Supply Wing; 600th Air Base Wing; 710th Special Operations Wing; Air Force Logistics Command; Air Force Reserve Command

Airfield information
- IATA: CRK; ICAO: RPLC

Summary
- Elevation AMSL: 148 m (486 ft)
- Coordinates: 15°11′09″N 120°33′35″E

Map
- Location of Clark Air Base in the Philippines

Runways
Direction	Length		Surface
Direction	m	ft	Surface
02R/20L	3,200	10,499	Asphalt/concrete
02L/20R	3,200	10,499	Asphalt/concrete

Clark Air Base is a Filipino Air Force base in Luzon, located 3 miles (4.8 km) west of Angeles City, and about 40 miles (64 km) northwest of Metro Manila. It was previously operated by the U.S. Air Force and, before that, the U.S. Army, from 1903 to 1991. The base covered 14.3 square miles (37 km^{2}) with a military reservation extending north that covered another 230 square miles (600 km^{2}).

The base was a stronghold of combined Filipino and American forces during the final months of World War II, and a backbone of logistical support during the Vietnam War until 1975. Following the departure of American forces in 1991 due to the eruption of Mount Pinatubo and rejection by the Philippine Senate for renewing the presence of U.S. military bases in the Philippines, the base became the site of Clark International Airport, as well as the Clark Freeport and Special Economic Zone and the Air Force City of the Filipino Air Force.

In 2014, the United States and the Philippines signed the Enhanced Defense Cooperation Agreement, which allows the United States to rotate troops into the Philippines for extended stays and allows the United States to build and operate facilities on Filipino bases for both American and Filipino forces. While it did not allow the U.S. to establish any permanent military bases, it allows for the return of a rotational US troop presence in the former US bases, including Clark.

== History ==
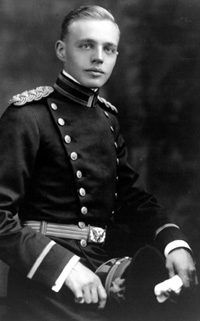
Maj. Harold M. Clark, the namesake of Clark Air Base

=== Establishment and prewar era ===
Clark Air Base was originally established as Fort Stotsenburg in Sapang Bato, Angeles, Pampanga in 1903 under control of the U.S. Army, after American colonizers seized the Philippines in 1898. The nearby municipality of Mexico, Pampanga, was settled by an earlier tranche of colonizers from Mexico during the Spanish era. A portion of Fort Stotsenburg was officially set aside for the Aviation Section of the Signal Corps and named Clark Field in September 1919 after Harold M. Clark, who died in a seaplane crash in the Miraflores Locks, Panama Canal Zone on May 2, 1919. The building of Clark Air Base on over 32,000-hectare land dispossessed Indigenous Aeta communities. Clark later served as a landing field for U.S. Army Air Corps medium bombers and accommodated half of the heavy bombers stationed in the Philippines during the 1930s. It was very large for an air field of its day, and in the late summer and fall of 1941, many aircraft were sent to Clark in anticipation of a war with Imperial Japan. However, most of them were destroyed on the ground during an air raid nine hours after the Pearl Harbor attack.

=== World War II era ===
The base was attacked by Japanese forces on December 8, 1941 destroying dozens of aircraft and the base was evacuated on December 24. American forces on Bataan and Corregidor fell on April 9, 1942 leading a few days later to the brutal Bataan Death March. Clark became a major center for Japanese air operations throughout the war. Japanese aircraft flying out of Clark participated in the Battle of Leyte Gulf, the largest naval battle of the Second World War and by criteria of Gross-Tonnage Sunk, the largest in history.

During the war, Allied prisoners on the Bataan Death March passed by the main gate of Clark Air Base as they followed the railway tracks north towards Camp O'Donnell. During October through January 1945 American air raids damaged or destroyed over 1,500 Japanese aircraft. On January 31, American forces regained possession of Clark Field after three months of fierce fighting to liberate the Philippines. It was immediately returned to U.S. Army Air Forces control.

=== Postwar era ===
Clark grew into a major American air base during the Cold War, as a launching pad for the Korean War and serving as an important logistics hub during the Vietnam War.

The U.S. bases became a political issue in the Philippines during the 1960s, which saw a resurgence of Filipino nationalism, especially among students. A major flashpoint in the issue was the November 25, 1964, fatal shooting by off-duty US Airman First Class Larry D. Cole of 14-year-old Rogelio Balagtas, one of several boys who were scavenging discarded shell casings from a firing range at Clark Air Base. It was further heightened by the shooting of 21-year-old Filipino laborer Glicerio Amor by US Navy Gunner's Mate 3/E Michael Moomey in Subic Naval Base on June 10, 1969. These two incidents were later combined and dramatized in the 1976 Filipino film "Minsa'y Isang Gamu-gamo."

=== During the Marcos dictatorship ===
By the time Ferdinand Marcos was inaugurated as the Tenth President of the Philippines on December 30, 1965, the bases agreement between the Philippines and the US was nearly two decades old, and the continued presence of Clark and the other United States bases in the Philippines helped shape the tone of the relationship between the two countries. All five of the American presidents from 1965 to 1985 were unwilling to jeopardize the US–Marcos relationship, mainly because they felt a need to protect and retain the bases in order to project power in Asia and the Asia-Pacific. Marcos managed to hold on to power for 21 years, despite Martial Law and the many human rights violations perpetuated by his administration, and the negative international press that came with it all, by manipulating the U.S. military's dependence on the bases.

The presence of the bases continued to be rallying points in the First Quarter Storm protests in Manila January to March 1970, alongside the deployment of Filipino troops to the Vietnam War and the economic strain caused by the 1969 Filipino balance of payments crisis and Marcos' debt-driven spending in the leadup to the 1969 presidential campaign.

1970 also saw a major diplomatic incident at Clark Air Base in what US Presidential Assistant for National Security Affairs Henry Kissinger later called "the Williams Case". In June 1970, Angeles City Court of First Instance Ceferino Gaddi ordered the arrest of Base Commander Colonel Averill Holman and Base Chief of International Law Lt. Col. Raymond Hodges, citing in contempt for allowing the transfer of US Air Force Staff Sergeant Bernard Willams to the US in November 1969, despite the fact that he had been arraigned in the Angeles Court in August 1969 on criminal charges of abduction and attempted rape. Williams was eventually returned to the Philippines, although the Marcos administration refused to enforce the court ordered arrests against Holman and Hodges. The incident helped the push for the renegotiation of the US-Philippines Bases Treaty in 1979, in an effort to clarify the issue of Filipino sovereignty and jurisdiction over the bases.

In 1971, unfair labor practices – including frequent strip searches, penalites for speaking in non-English languages, unexplained termination and the nonpayment of benefits – led the civilian workers at the base to stage a three-day strike which began on March 3, followed by a half-month strike which began on July 25. The Federation of Filipino Civilian Employees Associations would organize further major strikes in 1979, 1983 and in March 1986.

Near the end of his second constitutionally allowed terms as President, Ferdinand Marcos declared Martial law in September 1972, effectively extending his hold on power for fourteen years, until he was deposed in 1986. This had minimal impact on life in or the operations of Clark Air Base, although those who lived outside the base had to comply with a curfew which was in place from 12 midnight to 4 in the morning, until Martial Law was technically lifted in 1981.

1977 marked the beginning of the Presidency of Jimmy Carter in the United States, which marked a major shift in diplomatic relations where the US became critical of Marcos' human rights record. However, this criticism was tempered by the US' need for political leverage as the US-Philippines Bases Treaty was renegotiated in 1979.

In 1979, the Military Bases Agreement was substantially altered in many areas in direct response to growing Filipino popular criticism. A Filipino commander was designated at each base but the US retained operational command over US facilities located there, substantially reducing areas directly under US control. The issue of compensation was also addressed for the first time with the US agreeing to pay $500 million for a five-year period. This increased to $900 million in 1983 for the next five years.

Clark Air Base played a key part in the end of the Marcos regime in the Philippines. When the Marcoses were deposed in February 1986, they fled the Presidential Palace and were flown to Clark, and it was from there that the US government flew them into exile in Hawaii.

=== Later years and transfer to the Philippines ===
On October 29, 1987, unidentified gunmen shot and killed three airmen.

On May 14, 1990, suspected New People's Army (NPA) communist rebels shot and killed two airmen.

Before extensive damage from the Mount Pinatubo volcanic eruption of 1991, the Filipino government offered to renew the leases on Clark, Subic and a handful of smaller bases for $825 million annually. After the volcanic eruption, the U.S. offered about $200 million annually and only for Subic; the lease for Clark was not renewed.

In November 1991, the United States Air Force lowered the U.S. flag and transferred Clark Air Base to the Filipino government. With the United States military's withdrawal from Clark, the base was systematically looted by the local population and was left abandoned for several years. It finally became the Clark Freeport Zone, the site of Clark International Airport (CIA) and parts of it are still owned and operated by the Filipino Air Force, retaining the same name, Clark Air Base.

As of 2025, an estimated 20,000 Indigenous Aeta communities reside in 32 villages in the Clark area.

==== Leftover toxic waste ====
A dispute arose over toxic waste contamination in Clark Air Base and Subic Naval Base as soon as the US government turned over the bases to the Philippine government. At the time, U.S. government and United Nations reports confirming serious contamination at 46 locations in the two bases had come out. But the U.S. government determined that it was not legally responsible for the cleanup.

Various Philippine administrations have sought to get the US government to take responsibility for the cleanup of the wastes, but to no avail.

=== Visiting Forces Agreements ===
In June 2012, the Filipino government, under pressure from Chinese claims to their seas, agreed to the return of American military forces to Clark.

In April 2016, an air contingent of USAF A-10s and HH-60s was deployed from US air bases in Pyeongtaek and Okinawa to Clark. The air contingent included five A-10C Thunderbolt IIs from the 51^{st} Fighter Wing, Osan AB, South Korea; three HH-60G Pave Hawks from the 18^{th} Wing, Kadena AB, Japan; and approximately 200 personnel deployed from multiple Pacific Air Force units. The primary mission of the contingent appears to be to patrol disputed South China Sea islands, "to provide greater and more transparent air and maritime domain awareness to ensure safety for military and civilian activities in international waters and airspace". The air contingent builds upon previous deployments by U.S. Navy P-8 Poseidon aircraft to Clark.

== Military units ==
During much of the Cold War, Clark Air Base's activity largely revolved around the 405^{th} Fighter Wing, later renumbered as the 3^{rd} Tactical Fighter Wing in September 1974 and its fleet of F-4 Phantom II fighter jets. It also hosted an interceptor squadron and a flight school, all of which flew a variety of other combat aircraft. Transient aircraft of many types, especially cargo jets, were common.

Fighter planes regularly visited to participate in aerial warfare exercises at Crow Valley about 30 miles (48 km) to the northwest. In November 1973, headquarters for the 374^{th} Tactical Airlift Wing was transferred from Ching Chuan Kang Air Base, Taiwan, to Clark Air Base. With this move came two squadrons of C-130E transport aircraft, the 21^{st} Tactical Airlift Squadron and the 776^{th} Tactical Airlift Squadron.

Clark was served regularly by cargo and passenger flights to and from: Andersen AFB, Guam; Kadena AB, Japan; Diego Garcia; Jakarta, Indonesia; Bangkok and Ubon Thailand; and Saigon, South Vietnam (until 1975). During the 1970s, passengers arrived via Trans International Douglas DC-8 and Braniff International DC-8s (the Pickle and the Banana) flights from Travis AFB, California (via Honolulu and Guam).

By 1980, the base had grown to such an extent that weekly Flying Tigers Boeing 747 service to St. Louis (via Kadena AB Japan; Anchorage; and Los Angeles) had begun. The 747 service was taken over by Tower Air sometime in the late 1980s and was augmented with a weekly Hawaiian Airlines L-1011 or Douglas DC-8 to Guam-Honolulu-Los Angeles.

== Culture ==
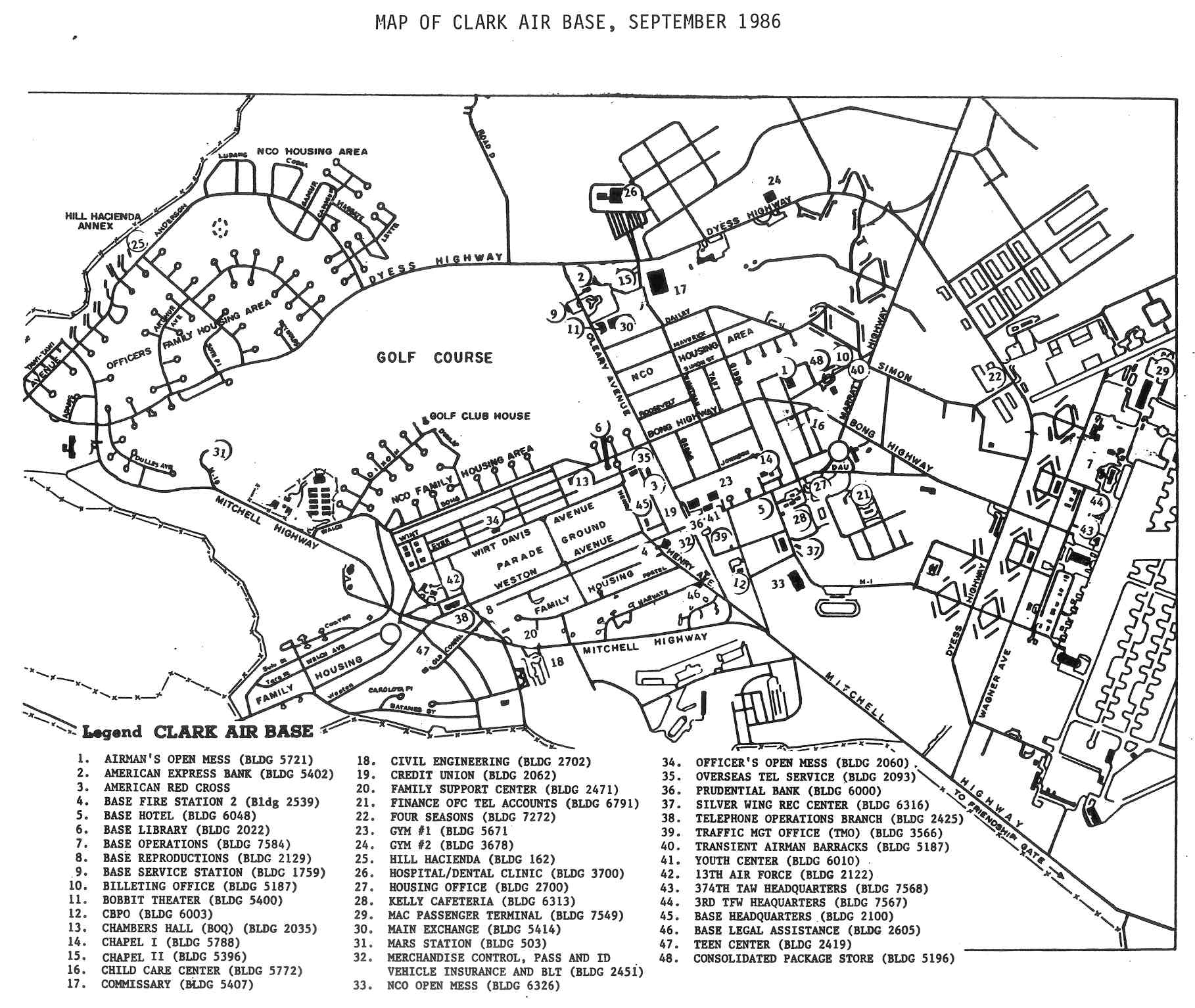
A map of Clark Air Base, 1986

Clark Air Base was arguably the most urbanized military facility in history and was the largest American base overseas. At its peak around 1990, it had a permanent population of 15,000. It had a base exchange, large commissary, small shopping arcade, branch department store, cafeterias, teen centers, hotel, miniature golf, riding stables, zoo, and other concessions.

=== Recreation ===
Angeles City bars were legendary, particularly around the red-light district on Fields Avenue. As a result, Clark's servicemen's clubs were under considerable pressure to serve its members with wholesome entertainment. All three were large-scale operations: the Officer's Club (CABOOM) near the parade ground, the Top Hat Club for non-commissioned officers (NCOs) near Lily Hill, which moved to near the Silver Wing in 1986, and the Coconut Grove Airmen Open Mess (AOM) housed in a large vaulted room that contained palm trees.

The officer's club featured a four star dining room, but catered to NCO's during lunchtime. The airman's club got first dibs on Broadway shows and swing bands due to an agreement that whoever paid transportation costs got priority. The NCO club came second. The airman's club had numerous theme bars and rental girls for dance partners during swing band tenures on the large dance floor. The club security (bouncers) were outfitted in formal PI wear each evening of a different hue. The PI formal wear for men was lace shirts (the barong Tagalog) with French cuffs, traditional and very elegant. The volume of enlisted troops flowing through PI to South Vietnam created a large audience for AOM offerings. The NCO Club was still a very extensive operation and operated: an upscale dining room, an in-house thrift shop, a pinball arcade and a calendar of daily activities. It regularly brought major bands and artists from the United States to perform.

At least, a hundred sponsored clubs and organizations were active on the base, including: the Knights of Columbus, a Latino American club, the Civil Air Patrol and martial arts dojos. Two major movie theaters operated daily: the Bobbitt Theater which played first-run films, and the Kelly Theater which showed older releases. By 1988, the Kelly Theater ceased showing films and was used mainly for Commander's Calls and large squadron-sized meetings. In the late 1960s and early 1970s, movies were also shown at the Bamboo Bowl, the football stadium on base.

The Bamboo Bowl, later renamed Challenger Field, was used mainly for high school football games as the school did not have its own athletic field. In addition to high school football games, it also hosted recreational league football games for ages 8–18. The high school football teams were included as part of the recreational league. The base's sole high school, Wagner High, had multiple football teams. It was also used for the base's 11-man tackle football league, which not only included teams from Clark but from Subic Naval Base as well.

To keep the residents entertained at home, Clark had an active broadcast center called FEN, or Far East Network Philippines, a division of American Forces Network. A television station broadcast on Channel 8, then Channel 17 after 1981. It showed about 20 hours per day of syndicated programs from the "big three" networks in the United States, with local news and talk programs. The content was locally syndicated until 1983 when it began airing live programming by satellite from Los Angeles.

FEN had two 24-hour radio stations: an AM station which broadcast news and popular music, and stereo FM which was dedicated to easy-listening and classical music. Local Filipino TV also aired newer American shows than FEN did. Unlike the local TV stations in Europe, they were broadcast in the same format as American TV and not dubbed in Tagalog, the local language. Likewise, several American-styled radio stations in Manila were popular with Clark residents: one notable example in the 1980s was 99.5 DWRT-FM.

Two major annual events at Clark were the annual Chili Cookoff, held near the Silver Wing recreation center around September, and the Happening on the Green ("the HOG") in February. The HOG attracted thousands of residents. Amusements and rides were built and operated not only by Filipino entertainment contractors but also by individual Air Force units seeking to boost unit morale, showcase their talents, and raise unit funds.

Because of the warm climate and the large number of units, slow pitch softball tournaments were held quarterly. There were at least two gymnasiums, three walking/running tracks and seven softball fields on base. There were also tennis courts, a clubhouse with tennis merchandise, and tennis pros available for a couple of dollars per hour to hit with you at any time. They had a local tournament each year.

=== Pop culture references ===
In 2017, author Bill Bowers with Sandee Hart published, "Nighthawk A young Airman's Tour at Clark Air Base", a first hand memoir of what life was like at Clark in the 1980s.

In 2013, author Nick Auclair published Steel's Treasure, a fictional novel set in Clark Air Base.

The 1969 novel "One to Count Cadence", by James Crumley, has its initial setting in an Army unit stationed at Clark Air Base, and has become the "Catch 22" novel of the Vietnam War.

=== Education ===
The Department of Defense Dependents Schools (DoDDS) operated six schools at Clark Air Base, serving children from kindergarten to the twelfth grade.

- Elementary schools (kindergarten–5^{th} grade): MacArthur Elementary School, V.I. Grissom Elementary School and Wurtsmith Elementary School. The latter two were located in the hill housing area. Most officers and senior enlisted families attended Grissom.
- Middle schools (6^{th}–8^{th} grade): Lily Hill Middle School and Wagner Middle School. The latter, primarily, served the hill housing area and officer dependents.
- High school: Wagner High School, known as "Clark Dependent School" in the 1950s and "Wurtsmith Memorial High School" in the 1960s.

Clark was also home to several community colleges, namely the Pacific Far East Campus of Central Texas College. Most classes were held in the evenings, at Wagner High School.

== Higher commands ==
Clark Air Base was assigned to the following major commands:

- War Dept, 1903
- Filipino Dept, 1917
- The Adjutant General of the Army, Dept of the Philippines, 1919
- Air Forces, United States Army Forces in the Far East, August 4, 1941
- Filipinos Dept Air Force, September 20, 1941.
  - Redesignated: Far East Air Force, December 20, 1941
- Occupied by the Imperial Japanese Army between 20 December 1941 and 10 February 1945
- Sixth United States Army, February 16, 1945
- Eighth United States Army, May 15, 1945
- Far East Air Force, June 1945
  - Redesignated: Pacific Air Command, USA, December 6, 1945
  - Redesignated: Far East Air Force, January 1, 1947
  - Redesignated: Pacific Air Forces, 1 July 1957 – 16 December 1991

== Climate ==
Climate at the base is characterized by two distinct seasons: a "dry season" from November through April, and a "rainy season" with monsoon rains that occur from May through October. During the dry season, winds are usually northeasterly and skies are fair. Some afternoon showers tend to appear by April. April brings the highest average temperatures of any month, though the hottest days of the year tend to occur in May. Due to the very dry state of vegetation at this time, ash and soot often falls on Clark Air Base as farmers burn their fields for planting. During drought years, wildfires occasionally broke out in the overgrown areas west of the golf course and northeast of the airfield.

Rainy season normally arrives during the month of June. July and August are wet, with many dark overcast days, and frequent afternoon and evening rains. Typhoons are common in late summer and fall, approaching from the east. They are rarely strong at Clark Air Base as the facilities are far inland, and the typhoon circulation is disrupted by the Sierra Madre mountain range on the east coast. Rain and typhoon activity diminishes sharply by November and December, when the dry season arrives once again. Temperatures are at their coolest, with nighttime lows sometimes falling to 64 °F (18 °C) or lower.

From 1953 to 1991, the mean daily low was 73.6 °F (23.1 °C) and the mean daily high was 88.1 °F (31.2 °C), with April being warmest and January coolest. The average annual rainfall was 78.39 inches (1,991 mm).

Climate data for Clark Air Base, Angeles City, Republic of the Philippines (1961–90)
Month	Jan	Feb	Mar	Apr	May	Jun	Jul	Aug	Sep	Oct	Nov	Dec	Year
Mean daily maximum °C (°F)	30 (86)	31 (88)	32 (90)	34 (93)	33 (92)	32 (89)	31 (87)	30 (86)	31 (87)	31 (87)	31 (87)	30 (86)	31 (88)
Mean daily minimum °C (°F)	21 (70)	22 (71)	22 (72)	24 (75)	24 (76)	24 (76)	24 (75)	24 (75)	24 (75)	24 (75)	23 (73)	22 (72)	23 (74)
Average precipitation mm (inches)	13 (0.51)	17 (0.68)	27 (1.07)	58 (2.28)	199 (7.82)	299 (11.76)	403 (15.87)	407 (16.04)	316 (12.44)	185 (7.29)	103 (4.04)	39 (1.54)	2,066 (81.34)
Source: National Climatic Data Center.

== See also ==
- Clark Freeport Zone
- Clark International Airport
- Clark Veterans Cemetery

Other United States Air Force installations in the Philippines:

- Camp O'Donnell
- Crow Valley Range Complex
- John Hay Air Base
- Mactan Air Base
- Wallace Air Station

General:

- Geography of the Philippines
- Military History of the Philippines
- Military History of the United States
- United States Army Air Forces in the South West Pacific Theatre
- United States bases in the Philippines

== Bibliography ==
- Fletcher, Harry R. (1989) Air Force Bases Volume II, Active Air Force Bases outside the United States of America on September 17, 1982. Maxwell AFB, Alabama: Office of Air Force History. ISBN 0-912799-53-6
- Mandocdoc, M. and David, C.P. 2008. Dieldrin Contamination of the Groundwater in a Former US Military Base (Clark Air Base, Philippines). CLEAN Air, Soil, Water Journal 36 (10–11), 870–874.
- Martin, Patrick (1994). Tail Code: The Complete History of USAF Tactical Aircraft Tail Code Markings. Schiffer Military Aviation History. ISBN 0-88740-513-4.
- Maurer, Maurer (1983). Air Force Combat Units of World War II. Maxwell AFB, Alabama: Office of Air Force History. ISBN 0-89201-092-4.
- Ravenstein, Charles A. (1984). Air Force Combat Wings Lineage and Honors Histories 1947–1977. Maxwell AFB, Alabama: Office of Air Force History. ISBN 0-912799-12-9.
- Rogers, Brian (2005). United States Air Force Unit Designations Since 1978. Hinkley, England: Midland Publications. ISBN 1-85780-197-0.
- Auclair, Nick (2013). Steel's Treasure. On The Fence Writers. ISBN 0989173607.
- Sheftall, M.G. (2005). Blossoms in the Wind: Human Legacies of the Kamikaze. NAL Caliber. pp. 480pp. ISBN 0-451-21487-0.
