= List of defunct airlines of the Philippines =

This is a list of defunct airlines of the Philippines.

Airline	Image	IATA	ICAO	Callsign	Commenced operations	Ceased operations	Notes
Aboitiz Air			BOI		1988	2010	Renamed 2GO
Aero Filipinas		AJ	AFI		1982	1985	
Aerolift Philippines			AFT	Aerolifter	1982	1996	Closed in the aftermath of an accident.
Aero Majestic Charter Services			AMA		2010	2012	
Air Manila		UM			1964	1984	Merged into Philippine Airlines
Air Mindanao		MO			1979	1985	
Air Philippines		2P	GAP	Orient Pacific	1995	2010	Rebranded as Airphil Express
AirAsia Zest		Z2	EZD	ZEST	2013	2015	Merged into AirAsia Philippines
Airphil Express		2P	GAP	-	2010	2013	Rebranded as PAL Express
AirSWIFT		T6	ATX	AIRSWIFT	2002	2026	Merged into Cebgo.
Asian Spirit		6K	RIT	Asian Spirit	1995	2008	Rebranded to Zest Air.
Astro Air International		8Y	AAP	Astroair	1998	2016	Rebranded as Pan Pacific Airlines
Centennial Air					1998	2002	
Corporate Air					1995	2008	
Fil-Asian Airways		R1	RDV	FILASIAN	2013	2015	
Filipinas Orient Airways		FE			1964	1972	Merged into Philippine Airlines
Grand Air		8L	GDI		1994	1999	The airline was forced to close because of a debt problem.
Iloilo-Negros Air Express					1932	1947	Merged with Philippine Airlines and revived in 2001 to INAEC.
Interisland Airlines				TRI-BIRD	1986	2017	
Island Transvoyager			ITI		2002	2015	Renamed/merged to AirSWIFT
Laoag International Airlines		L7	LPN	Laoag Air	1995	2002	
LBC AW					1984	1995	
Mabuhay Airways Philippines					1974	2000	
Mid-Sea Express				MID-SEA	2008	2012	Renamed Fil-Asian Airways
Mindanao Express					1996		Later transitioned into bus company under San Agustin Transport Corporation and Erjohn & Almark. However, despite having "Mindanao" on its name, it was used to ply Lawton and Pasay to Nasugbu, Batangas via Lian, Batangas. It was later absorbed with San Agustin Transport Corp.
Mosphil Aero			MPI	MOSPHIL	2006	2009	
Pacific East Asia Cargo Airlines		Q8	PEC	PAC-EAST CARGO	1991	2010	
Pacific Pearl Airways			PPM	PACIFIC PEARL	2007	2010	
Philair					1966	1994	
Philippine Aerotransport		PN			1974		
South East Asian Airlines		DG	SRQ		1994	2013	Rebranded as Tigerair Philippines
South Phoenix Airways				Air Republiq	2001	2006	Rebranded at South Phoenix Airlines
Spirit of Manila Airlines		SM	MNP	MANILA SKY	2008	2011	
Star Asia Airlines		W6	TIM		1994	1996	
Sterling Philippines Airways		SX			1975	1980	Renamed/merged to Summit Philippines Airways
Tigerair Philippines		DG	SRQ		2013	2015	Rebranded as Cebgo
TransGlobal Airways		T7	TCU	TRANSGLOBAL	2006	2009	
Zest Air		Z2	EZD		2008	2013	Rebranded as AirAsia Zest

== See also ==
- List of airlines of the Philippines
- List of airports in the Philippines
