= List of airline liveries and logos =

How airlines decide to brand themselves and paint aircraft

The aircraft liveries and country, logo and airlines are used to provide a distinctive branding for corporates to support commercial gains. Often, symbols of national identity are also integrated to get accepted in an international market. Liveries and logos are listed alphabetically by type of symbolism.

== National flag, symbols, or elements of them ==
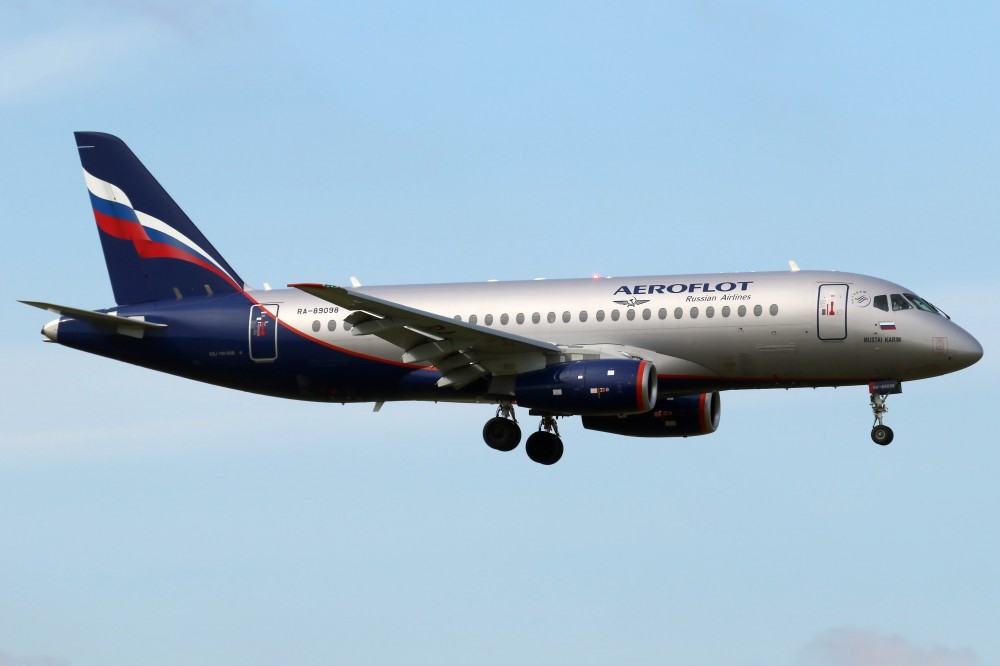
Sukhoi Superjet 100 of Aeroflot displaying the Russian flag on its tail

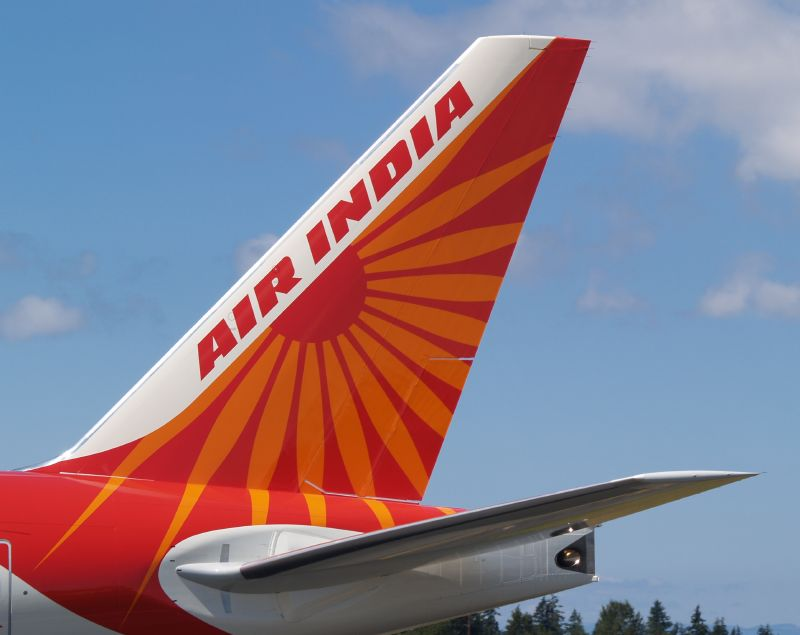
Rising sun with red shadow on an Air India Boeing 777 (older livery)

=== A ===
- Aeroflot: Russian national flag, with traditional winged hammer and sickle used on fuselage. A new livery was adopted in 2003.
- Air Algérie: The company logo is a swallow, which is the national bird of Algeria.
- Air Belgium: Belgium flag on tail and fuselage. The logotype, a crowned AB, accompanies the flag on the tail.
- Air Canada: Blue aircraft, with the name Air Canada and maple leaves on the front area of the fuselage, directly behind the cockpit, and on the tail. In 2017, a new livery was introduced with a white fuselage with a black underside, lettering, and tail with red maple leaf logos on the engines, fuselage, and tail. The new livery featured a black surrounding of the cockpit windows.
- Air France: French flag, formed as several sliced parallel lines of varying widths.
- Air India: The logo is a red flying swan with the wheel of the Konark Sun Temple painted in orange on the swan's spread-out wing. The 2023 rebranding, dubbed "The Vista", featured golden window trim about jharokha, a stone window which is a common feature to classic Indian architecture.
- Air Koryo: Features North Korean national colors on the livery and flag on the tail, as well as a crane.
- Air Malta: Maltese cross.

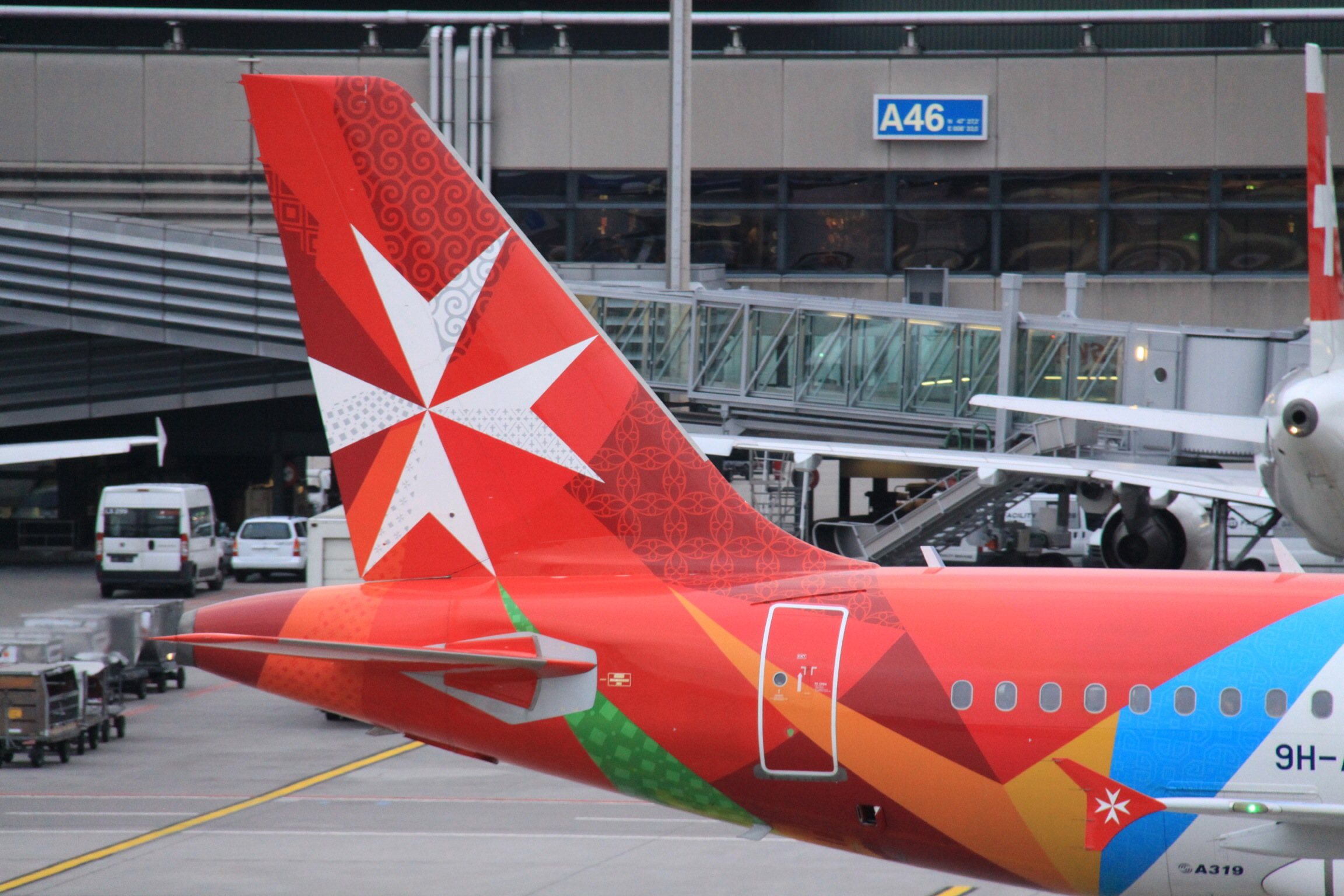
Maltese Cross on an Air Malta Airbus A319

- Air Namibia: Namibian flag.
- Air Puerto Rico: The Puerto Rican flag inside a sun.
- Air Serbia: stylized double-headed eagle inspired by the Serbian coat-of-arms.
- Air Wisconsin: Wisconsin’s original Dove appears to have picked up much of its livery from its previous owner Catalina-Vegas Airlines but to the orange and green stripes was added an aw logo designed by Gordon Fischer Advertising. The letter at the front of the tail was always in orange and the other in green so that on each side of the aircraft the colouring was different for each letter. This scheme would be used all the way through to the mid-80s when commuter airlines began to lose their identities.
- Alaska Airlines: Alaska Airlines aircraft liveries feature a blue Alaska logo on the sides and the Alaska Native on the tail, which attests to the airline's strong heritage of service to and involvement in Alaskan communities.
- Alitalia: Colors of the Italian flag in the "A" logo on the tail and along the plane.
- All Nippon Airways: The logotype "ANA".
- American Airlines: Stylized American flag on the tail, with the upgraded eagle design near the front exit doors. A new livery was adopted in January 2013.
- Austrian Airlines: Red-white-red tailfin with chevron (symbolizing an airplane taking off) with drop shadow added. The recent revision of the logo removed the shadow.
- Azul Brazilian Airlines: White aircraft with navy blue belly and tail. Several green and yellow stripes (resembling the colors of the Brazilian flag) are painted on the fuselage, tail, winglets, and engines. The logo on the tail is shaped like the map of Brazil, with each of the Brazilian states being shown as different colored geometrical forms.

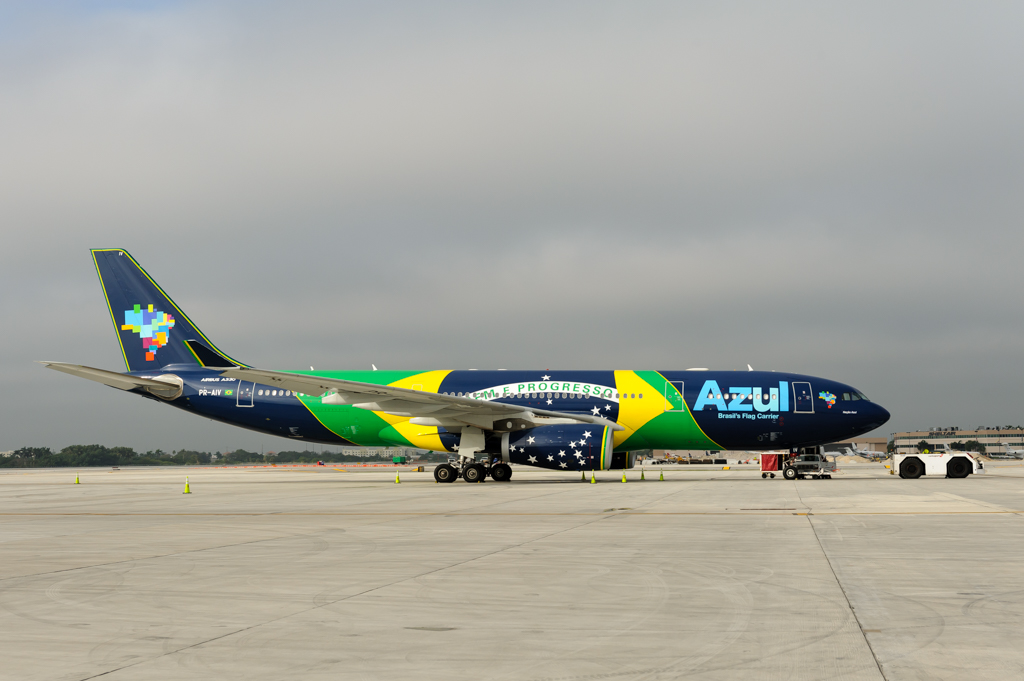
Brazilian flag on an Airbus A330 of Azul (non-standard livery for the airline)

=== B ===
- Batik Air: The logo consisted of a wax pen named canting inside of a letter "B" in the name. The livery is decorated in traditional Indonesian dyed pattern cloth (batik), which is also referenced in the airline's name.
- Biman Bangladesh Airlines: A white stork flying across the red sun.
- Breeze Airways: A checkmark on the aircraft's tail section on top of a blue wave, referencing the airlines' logo.
- British Airways: Britain's flag carrier shows a section of the British Union Flag on the aircraft tail. Some aircraft feature the Union Jack under the nose.
- Bulgaria Air: Bulgarian flag used on the tail.

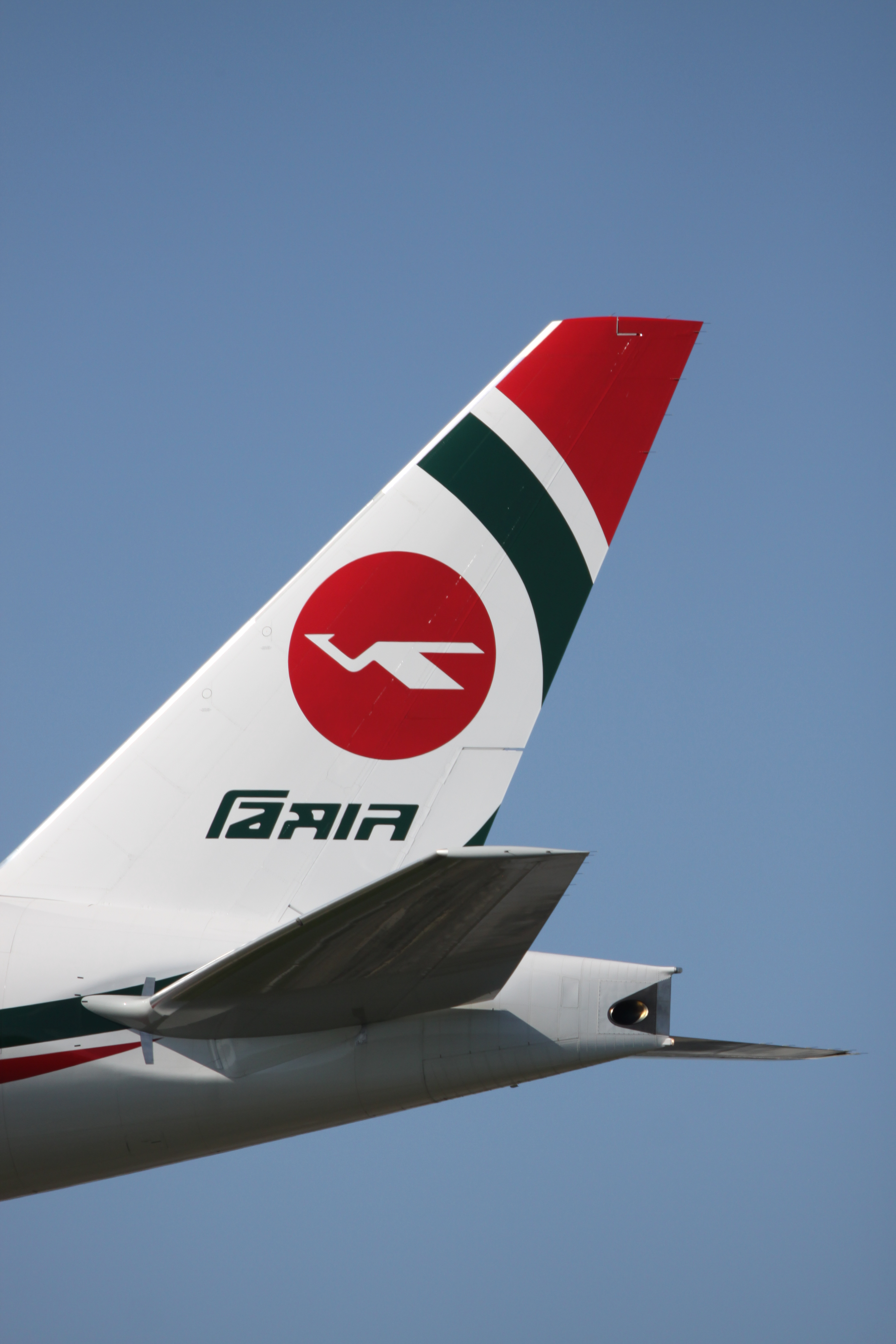
Balaka logo on a Biman Bangladesh Airlines Boeing 777-300

=== C ===
- Caribbean Airlines: The airline's logo, consisting of a colorful, stylized depiction of a flying hummingbird; a symbol representing flight, vibrancy and color. Also a specific tribute to the Republic of Trinidad and Tobago, known as "the land of the hummingbird". Previously, until march of 2020, the airline flaunted an image of a blue-winged broad-billed hummingbird.
- Cathay Dragon: Brush-stroke logo dubbed the "brush wing" represents a bird in flight through white Chinese calligraphy stroke on a red background, with a dragon from the Dragonair logo between the front door and the window cockpit.
- Cathay Pacific: The brush-stroke logo dubbed the "brush wing" represents a bird in flight through white Chinese calligraphy stroke on a green background.
- China Airlines: The pink plum blossom is the national flower of the Republic of China (Taiwan).
- China United Airlines: A pink letter C styled with elements from letter U on a dark blue background. Before 2024, it used the logotype "CUA". The rest of the livery elements are similar to Shanghai Airlines' 1990–2007 livery.
- Croatia Airlines: Part of the airline's logo consisting of a checkered design originating from the coat of arms of Croatia.

=== E ===
- EgyptAir: The airline's logo is Horus, the sky deity in ancient Egyptian mythology, usually depicted as a falcon or a man with the head of a falcon. The airline has taken Horus as its logo because of the ancient symbolism of a "winged god of the sun".
- El Al: Blue Star of David between rising blue bands.
- Emirates Airlines: United Arab Emirates flag.
- Ethiopian Airlines: Three interlocking slanted wedges as the tricolors of the flag of Ethiopia or Ethiopian Airlines.
- Etihad Airways: New "Facet of Abu Dhabi" livery, color usage is reminiscent of the desert landscape, and geometric patterns are used.

=== F ===
- Finnair: Stylized letter "F" in tail.

=== G ===
- Garuda Indonesia: The logo is a stylized mythical Hindu deity Garuda in shades of blue, which is also incorporated in Indonesia's state insignia.
- Georgian Airways: Flag of Georgia on the vertical stabilizer and a Borjgali on the logo which is a Georgian symbol of the sun and eternity.

=== I ===
- Iberia: An aircraft tailfin shape from a yellow piece and red piece (the Spanish flag colors) and a Royal yellow crown next to the registration number. Formerly a stylized IB in yellow and red with a crown.
- Iberojet (airline) (formerly Evelop Airlines): A dark blue "o" in a white circle. Formerly, as Evelop, the "o" was an exclamation mark "!".
- ITA Airways: The tailfin has a vertical green, white, and red stripe, derived from the Italian flag colors. The fuselage is in Savoy blue, the color of the former Italian royal family.

=== J ===
- Jetstar and Jetstar Japan: Abbreviation of the airlines name as 'Jet', with an orange star towards the peak of the tail.

=== K ===
- Kenya Airways: In 2005, Kenya Airways changed its livery. The four stripes running all through the length of the fuselage were replaced by the company slogan "Pride of Africa", whereas the KA tail logo was replaced by a styled K encircled with a Q to evoke the airline's IATA airline code.
- KLM: Stylized crown representing royal charter status.
- Korean Air: Taegeuk, the national symbol of South Korea, appears in a monochromatic dark blue on the tail. The fuselage features a metallic light-blue upper half with a curved separation line that divides it from the white lower half.
- KM Malta Airlines: The airline adopted the Maltese cross logo from its predecessor.

=== L ===
- LATAM Airlines: A stylized South American continent consisted of 4 lines, with 2 top lines folded inward. The logo applies to the group's associated airlines after the merger between TAM and LAN. As LAN Airlines, the livery consisted of a five-point star over a blue background with a red line below representing the color elements which is the national flag of Chile. The white and red colors also represent the flag colors of Peru and the associated nation's flag carrier - LAN Perú (later known as LATAM Perú).
- Loganair: A tartan pattern of kilt (the national garment of Scotland) featured in the vertical stabilizer.
- Lufthansa: A stylized crane within a circle flying toward the left.
- Luxair: The Luxembourg flag and the logo of the airline are on display on the back of the plane.

=== M ===
- Malev Hungarian Airlines: Hungarian flag shaped as a tail wing made of 3 lines with the national colors (red white green).
- Middle East Airlines: A cedar tree, which is the national emblem of Lebanon, in the tail. One of the current liveries, introduced in June of 2008, has the cedar placed on a white tail with two red bands rolling from the aircraft nose to tail.

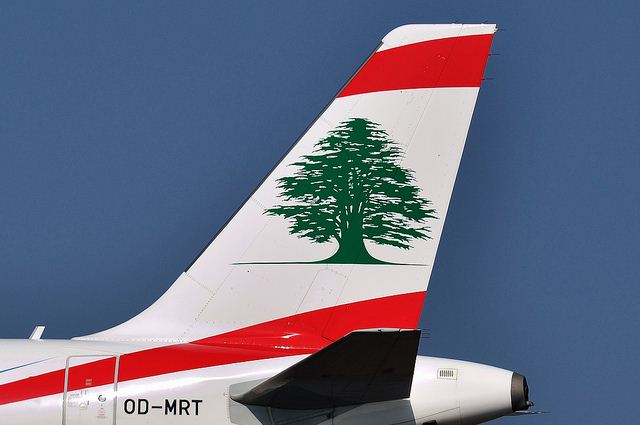
Stylized flag of Lebanon on Middle East Airlines Airbus A320 tail

=== N ===
- Nepal Airlines: Nepalese flag shaped as a tail wing made of sun and moon with the national colors (red and blue).
- Nordic Regional Airlines: The logo is a logotype "Norra" in caps with a smaller "O" like a degree symbol. The livery featured a portion of the small "O" on the vertical stabilizer.

=== P ===
- Pakistan International Airlines: the Pakistan flag in a wavy design takes up the whole tail in dark green colors with a white crescent moon and star.
- Pan Am World Airways Dominicana: Flag of the Dominican Republic, painted with brush.
- Philippine Air Lines: white livery with the company logo, a heavily stylized version of the Philippine flag (blue triangle with eight-ray sun and red triangle of the same size superimposed on it), on the tail, and "Philippines" on the fuselage near the main cabin.
- Porter Airlines: Diagonal lines featured the airline's name "Porter" on top of the blue wave in the vertical stabilizer.

=== R ===
- Rossiya Airlines: The logo is a stylized letter "R", referencing to airline's name.
- Royal Air Maroc: Green Sharifian star in the tail, with two parallel lines in national colors (green and red).
- Royal Brunei Airlines: Yellow tail with logotype "RB" and the Brunei national emblem above.
- Royal Jordanian: Royal Hashemite Crown of the Jordanian Monarchy.
- RwandAir: Yellow sun on the tail, with a blue stripe above it and a green one underneath it, from Rwanda’s national flag.

=== S ===
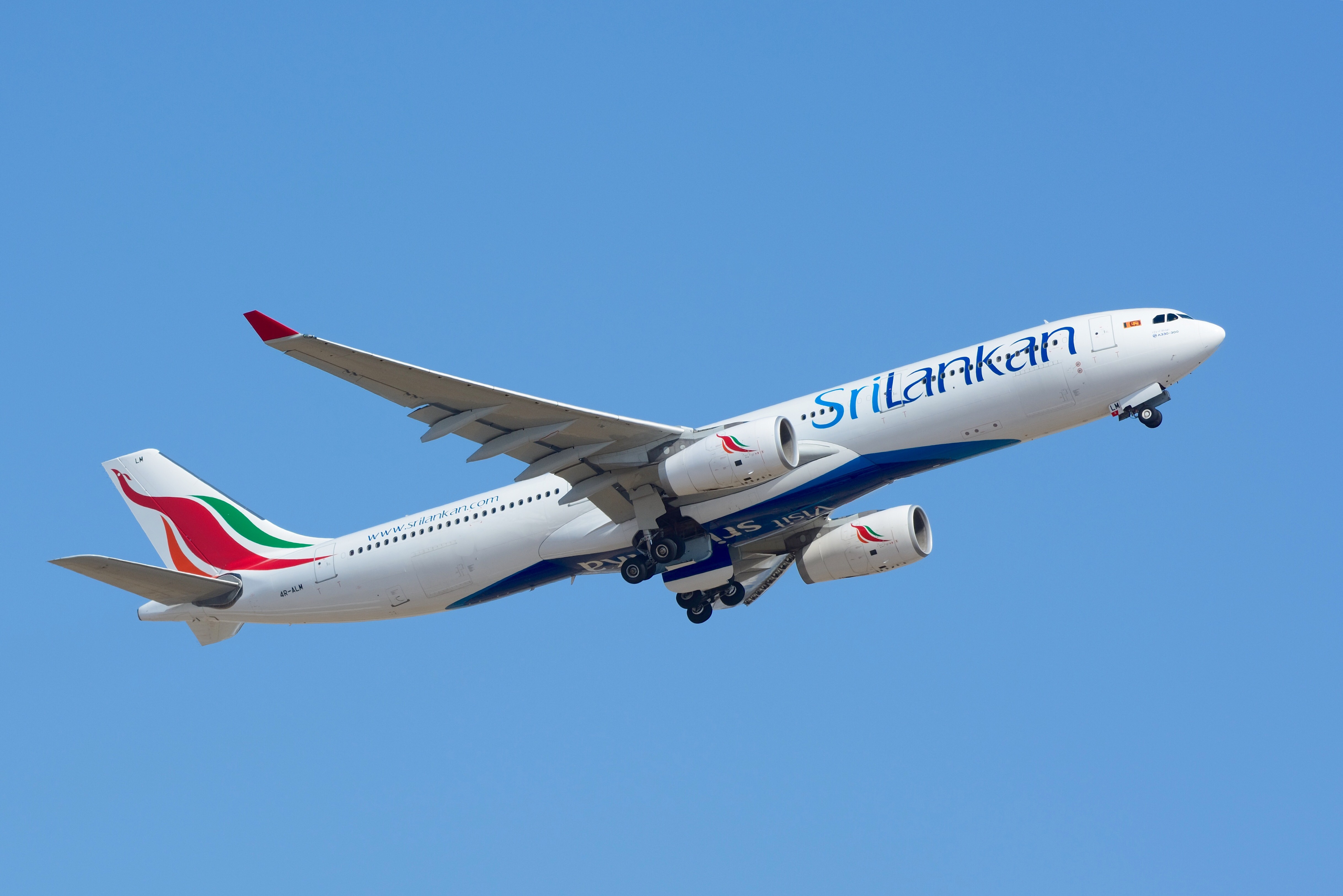
Airbus A330-300 of SriLankan Airlines wearing its regular livery

- Saudia: Two crossed swords with a palm tree, the Emblem of Saudi Arabia.
- Scandinavian Airlines: The logotype of the abbreviation of the airline's full name on top of the light beige fuselage and blue tail section, with "Scandinavian" on the engines and the underbelly of the plane.
- South African Airways: South African flag colors plus sun, adopted in 1997 (replacing the springbok antelope).
- Swissair/Swiss International Air Lines: Swiss white cross in a red parallelogram, which represents the national flag of Switzerland.
- SriLankan Airlines: A peacock with a maroon color body, orange and green wings taking in to the air representing the colors of the Sri Lankan flag, with "Visit Srilanka" on the underbelly of the plane.

=== T ===
- TAP Air Portugal: colors of the Portuguese flag in the "TAP" logo on the tail and fuselage.
- T'way Air: Apostrophe mark (referencing to airline's name) on top of the red wave in vertical stabilizer.
- Thai Airways International: a prominent purple tail with a gold and purple design resembling a Thai orchid, a white fuselage, and the airline's "TG" logo

=== U ===
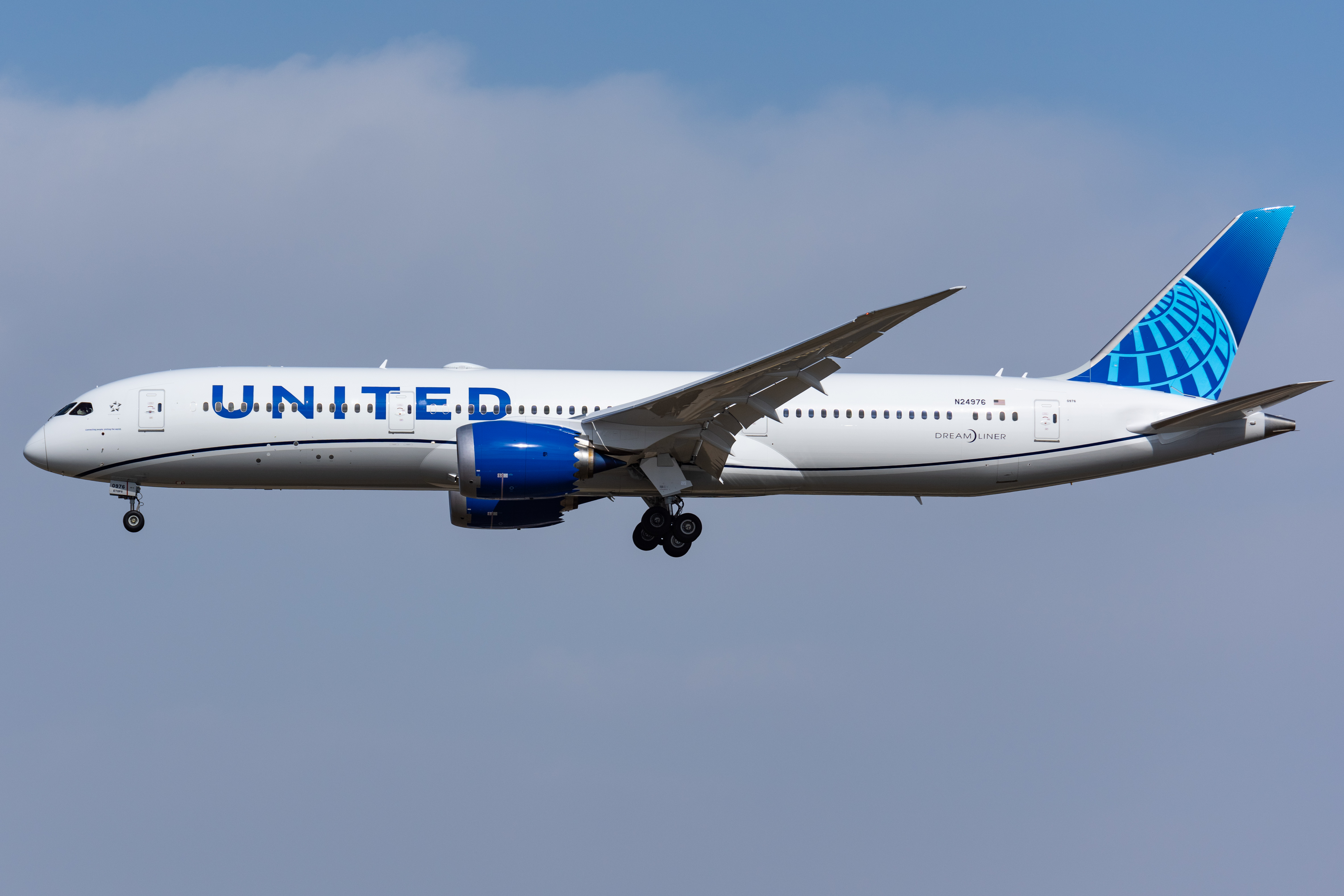
Evo Blue globe on a United Airlines Boeing 787-9

- United Airlines: Upon its 2010 merger with Continental Airlines, a globe, indicative of the wide-ranging destinations available. 1974–2010 logo: Blue and red colored stripes forming an overlapping "U" for "United". Nicknamed the Tulip.
- US Airways: The flag of the United States is incorporated into the US Airways logo and painted on the tail.
- Uzbekistan Airways: The national flag of Uzbekistan is painted on the tail.

=== V ===
- Virgin Atlantic/Virgin Australia/Virgin America (later merged to Alaska Airlines): Virgin Group logo lettering on the vertical stabilizer, with the name of the airline in the fuselage. The tail colors vary depending on the airline, either red (Atlantic, America) or white (Australia).
- Vistara: An 8-point star with each end forming a "V" from the airline's name, derived from a Yantra, an ancient symbol that depicts an unbounded universe in a perfect mathematical form.

=== W ===
- WestJet: The mountain graphic of the logo depicted the Canadian Rockies mountain range. The logo was later expanded with the mountain graphic encompassed inside a frame shaped like a maple leaf.

== Animals ==
=== Birds ===
==== A ====
- Aegean Airlines: The airline's first logo was two seagulls and a sun. The new logo featured two seagulls formed into a bigger seagull, representing the spirit of Greece and the airline's values. The new logo was inspired by Greek sky and seas, historical architecture and the country's design heritage.
- Aerolíneas Argentinas: A condor.
- Air Arabia: A seagull.
- Air Lithuania: A crane.
- Air Mauritius: A red paille-en-queue (red-tailed tropicbird or Phaethon rubricauda), a fish-eating tropical bird.
- Air Macau: A dove, with the wing also forming the shape of a lotus.

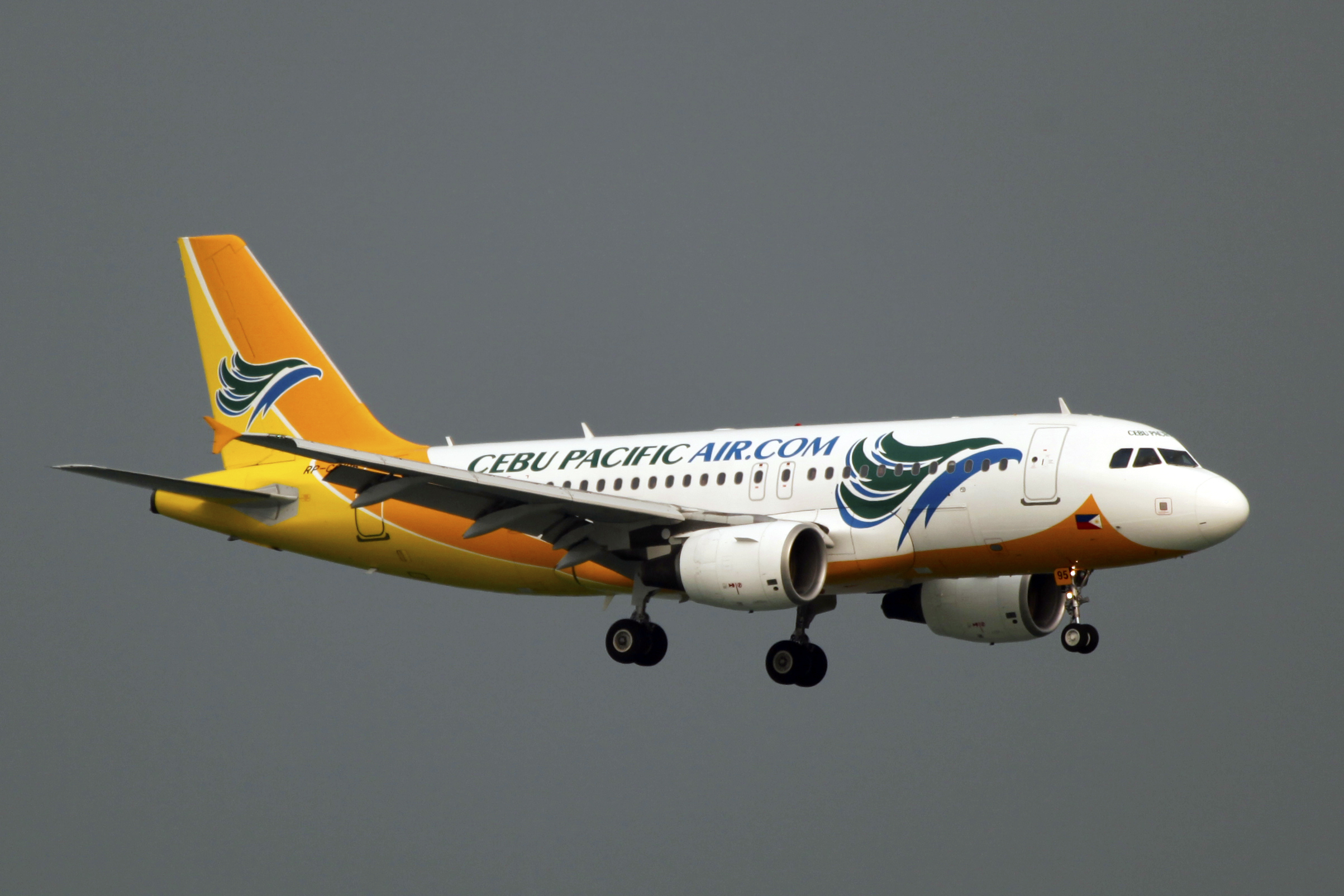
Stylized Philippine eagle head on a Cebu Pacific Airbus A319

- Air Niugini: A Raggiana bird of paradise (Paradisaea raggiana)
- Air Seychelles: A pair of white fairy terns (Sterna nereis).
- Air Zimbabwe: The national emblem of Zimbabwe, the Zimbabwe Bird.
- American Airlines: A bald eagle (Haliaeetus leucocephalus).
- Arajet: A macaw.
- Ariana Afghan Airlines A swallow, designed by the then King Mohammad Zahir Shah in 1955.
- Aurigny: An Atlantic puffin (Fratercula arctica).
- Avianca: A condor. The logo later applied to associated airlines after the merger with TACA.

==== B ====
- Bali Air: A purple bird.

==== C ====
- Canadian Airlines: A Canada goose.
- Caribbean Airlines: A hummingbird.
- Cebu Pacific: A Philippine eagle.
- Centralwings: A skua.
- China Eastern Airlines: A swallow. In the original logo, it shows inside a circle which upper red half circle represent sun and lower blue half represent ocean. In the 2014 logo, the tail of swallow represents Huangpu River.
- China Yunnan Airlines (later known as China Eastern Yunnan Airlines): A peacock.
- Condor Flugdienst: A condor.

==== F ====
- Fly Jamaica Airways: A black and green red-billed streamertail (Trochilus polytmus).
- Frontier Airlines: Various animals.

==== G ====
- Garuda Indonesia: An eagle.
- Gulf Air: A falcon.

==== I ====
- Iraqi Airways: A swallow.

==== J ====
- Japan Airlines: The tsurumaru or "crane circle", a Japanese red-crowned crane with its wings extended in full flight. An arc of the Hinomaru, the national flag, was used from 2008 to 2011.

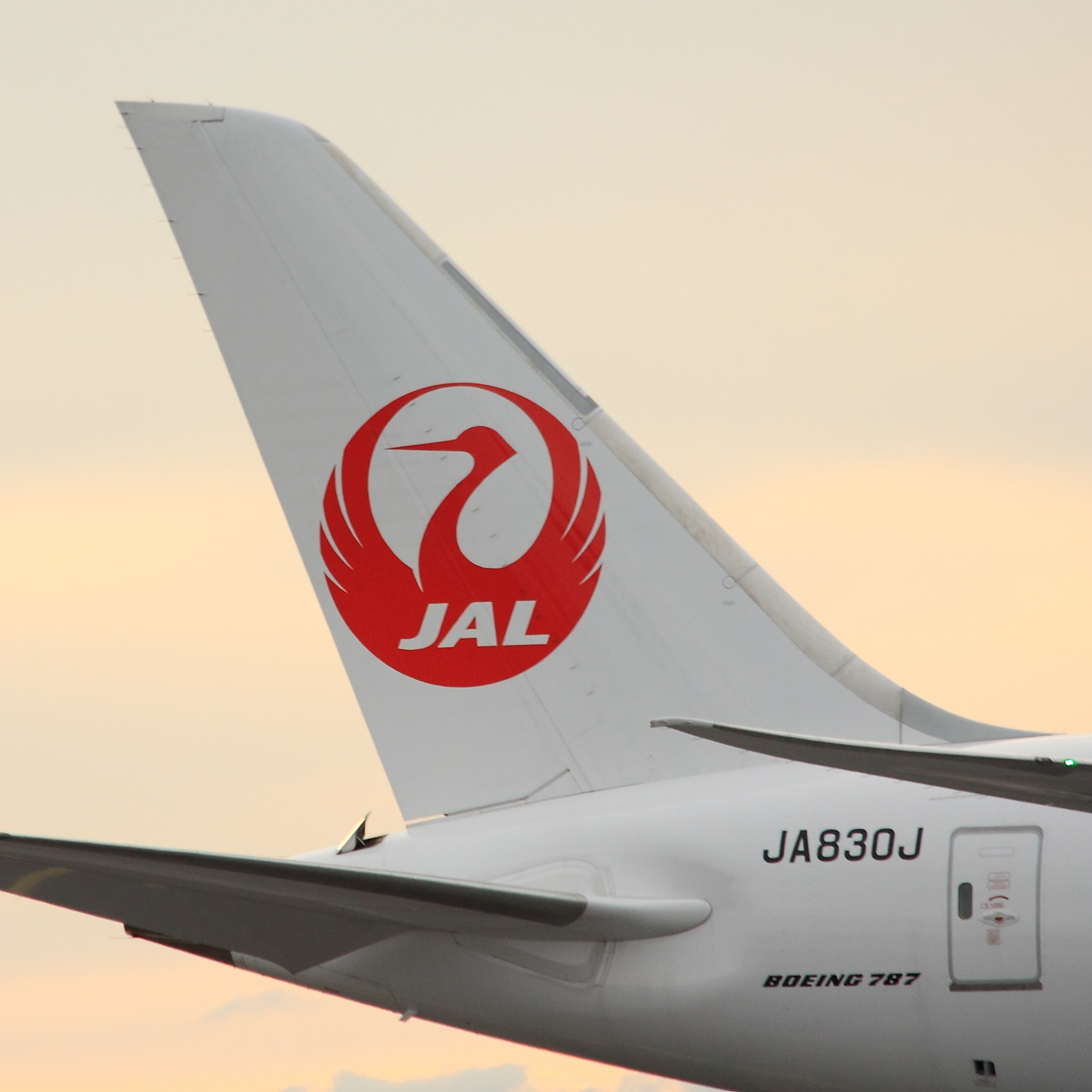
The tsurumaru logo on a Japan Airlines Boeing 787.

==== K ====
- Kam Air: A swallow.
- Kingfisher Airlines: A kingfisher.
- Kuwait Airways

==== L ====
- LOT Polish Airlines: A crane, designed by Tadeusz Gronowski in 1929.

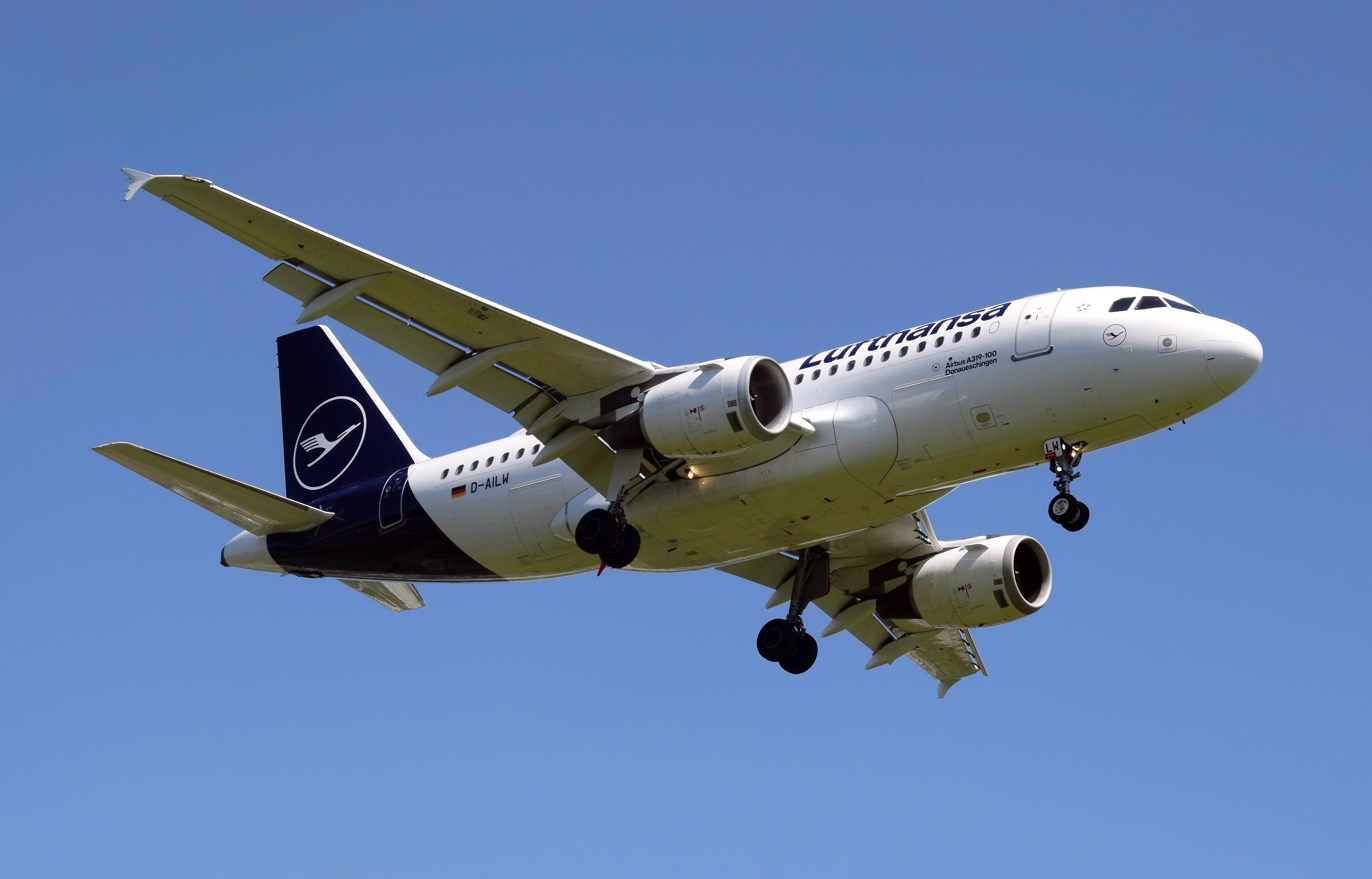
Airbus A319 of Lufthansa in the post-2018 livery. The stylised crane has been kept.

- Lufthansa, Deutsche Luft-Reederei and Deutsche Luft Hansa: A crane, designed by Otto Firle in 1919.

==== M ====
- Mandarin Airlines: A gyrfalcon.
- Mexicana de Aviación: An eagle.
- Montenegro Airlines: An eagle.

==== N ====
A Boeing 737 of Nok Air with its bird livery

- Neos Air: Red bird.
- Nok Air: Open beak (logo), bird head (liveries).
- North Central Airlines: A duck.

==== S ====
- SATA Air Azores: A goshawk.
- Shanghai Airlines: A Siberian crane.
- SilkAir: A seagull.
- Singapore Airlines: A bird inspired by a dagger called a kris.
- SriLankan Airlines: A peacock.
- Syrian Air: A condor.

==== T ====
- TACA Airlines (later known as Avianca El Salvador): A macaw.
- TAM Airlines (later known as LATAM Brasil): A lue seagull crossing the airline's name.
- TAROM: A swallow, first introduced in 1954.
- Turkish Airlines: A greylag goose.
- Turkmenistan Airlines: An egret.
- TruJet: A peacock.

==== X ====
- Xiamen Airlines: A crane.

=== Other animals ===
==== A ====
- Air Tanzania: Giraffe.

==== B ====
- Belle Air: Butterfly.

==== C ====
- Canadian North: The first logo was a polar bear on top of the midnight sun and Northern Lights on the side. After the merger with First Air, Canadian North used the silhouette of an inuksuk from the latter's last livery as the new logo.
- Cayman Airways: Turtle.
- Cyprus Airways (1947–2015): Mouflon.

==== E ====
- East African Airways: Lion.

==== L ====
- Lion Air: Winged lion.

==== M ====
- Malindo Air (later known as Batik Air Malaysia): Winged lion.

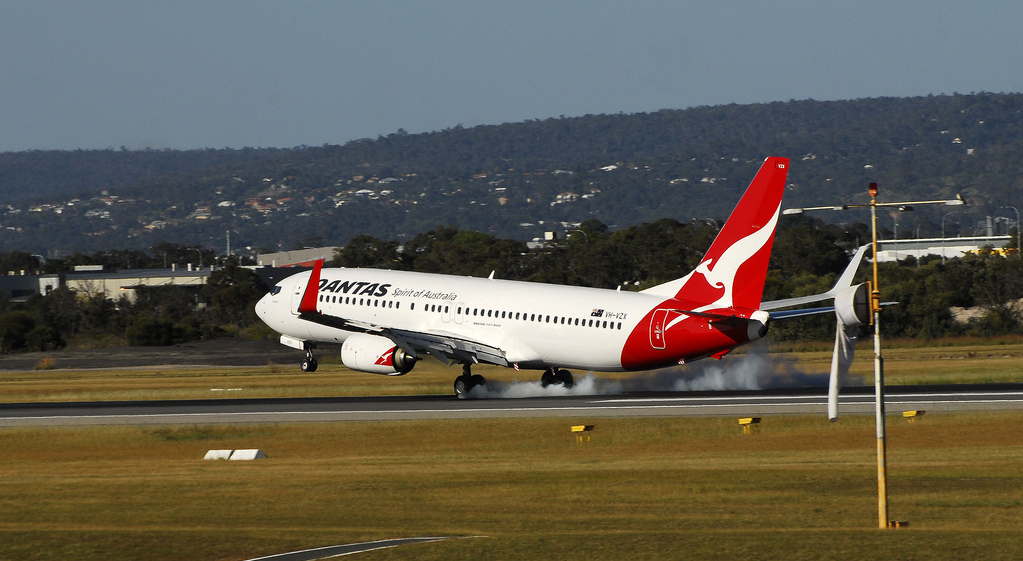
Qantas Boeing 737-800 in kangaroo livery

- MIAT Mongolian Airlines: Horse.

==== N ====
- Nigeria Airways: Elephant.

==== Q ====
- Qantas: Kangaroo, introduced in 1944 (had wings from 1947 to 1984).
- Qatar Airways: Oryx.

==== T ====
- TAAG Angola Airlines: Sable antelope.
- Tiger Airways (later known as Tigerair): Tiger.
- Tunisair: Gazelle.

== Plants ==
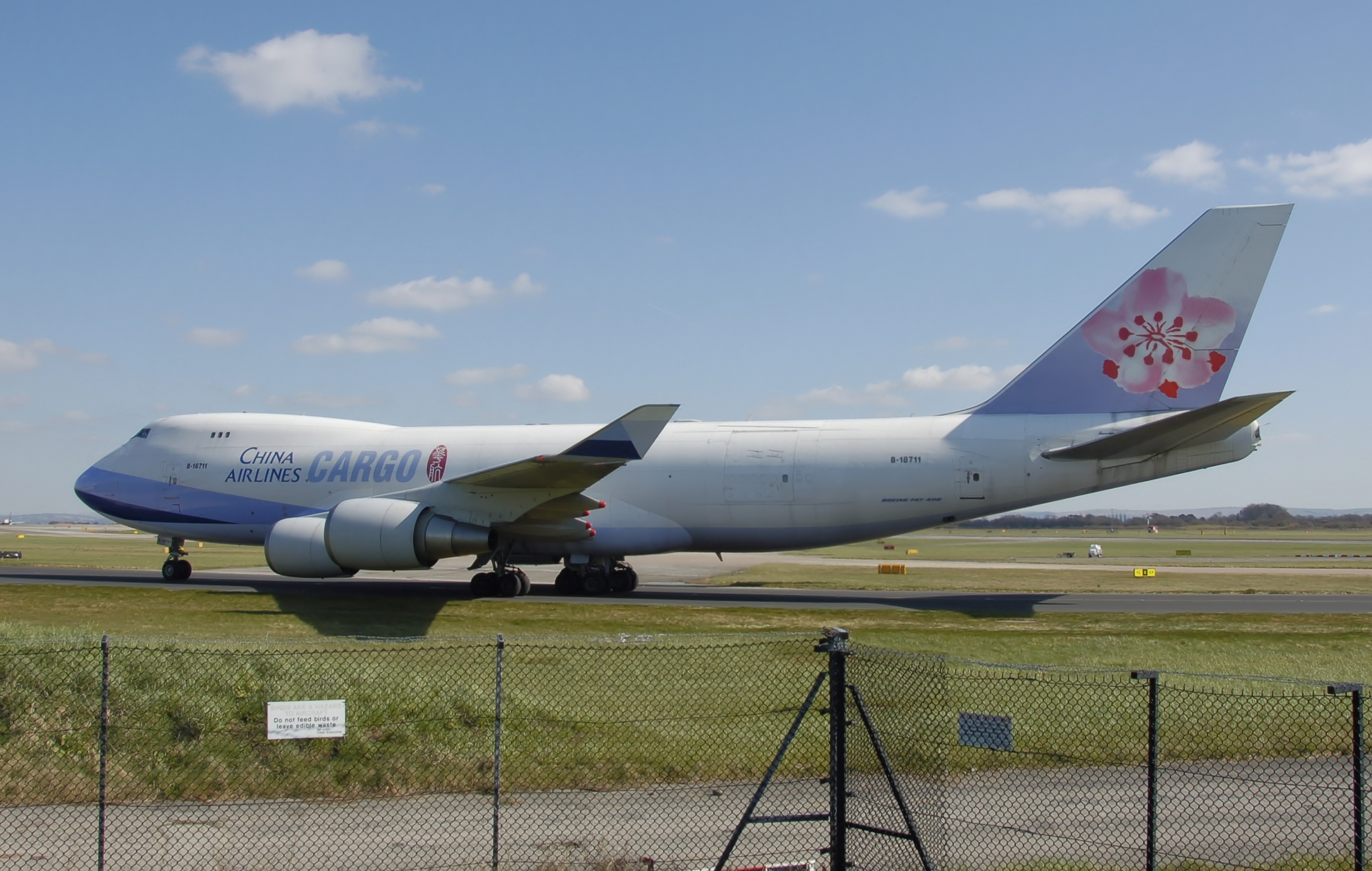
Plum blossom flower, the national flower of Republic of China (Taiwan), on a China Airlines 747-400

=== A ===
- Aer Lingus: Irish shamrock, first introduced in 1965.
- Air New Zealand: Fern frond unfolding, a Māori symbol for new life known as a koru.
- Airnorth: Palm tree.
- Air Tahiti Nui: Tiare.
- Aloha Airlines: Bird-of-paradise flower.

=== B ===
- Bamboo Airways: Bamboo. The logo consisted of blue and green shades formed into an airplane tail with white paint streaks, signifying a bamboo forest.

=== C ===
- China Southern Airlines: Bombax ceiba flower.
- Cyprus Airways (2017): Olive branch.

=== E ===
- Edelweiss: Edelweiss flower.

=== L ===
- Lao Airlines: Champa (frangipani) flower.

=== P ===
- Pan Pacific Airlines: Striped leaf, with type "panpacific".

=== T ===
- Thai Airways International: Calotropis gigantea, also known as crown flower, and not an orchid as usually assumed.

=== V ===
- Vietnam Airlines: Golden lotus.

== People ==
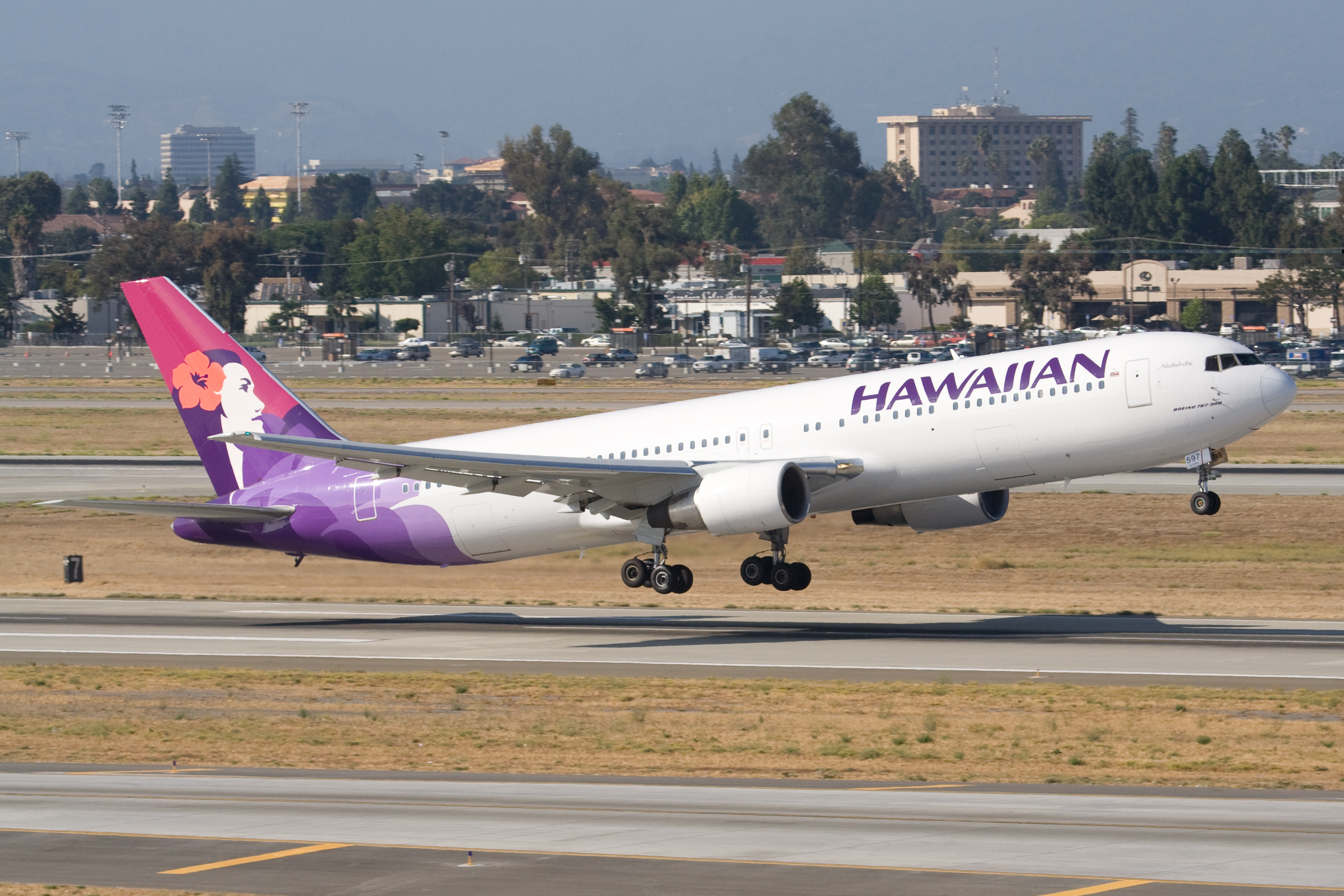
Pualani (flower of the sky) on a Hawaiian Airlines Boeing 767-300

- Adam Air: Human with wings.
- Aeroméxico: Aztec eagle-warrior.
- Asian Spirit: Colorful mask.
- Alaska Airlines: Inupiat, possibly Oliver Amouak.
- Hawaiian Airlines: Hawaiian Native woman, Leina'ala Drummond. This logo is also known as pualani (Hawaiian for flower in the sky).
- Norwegian Air Shuttle: Each tail fin features a Nordic entrepreneur, artist, painter, actor or explorer.
- Siam Air: Woman.

== Objects ==
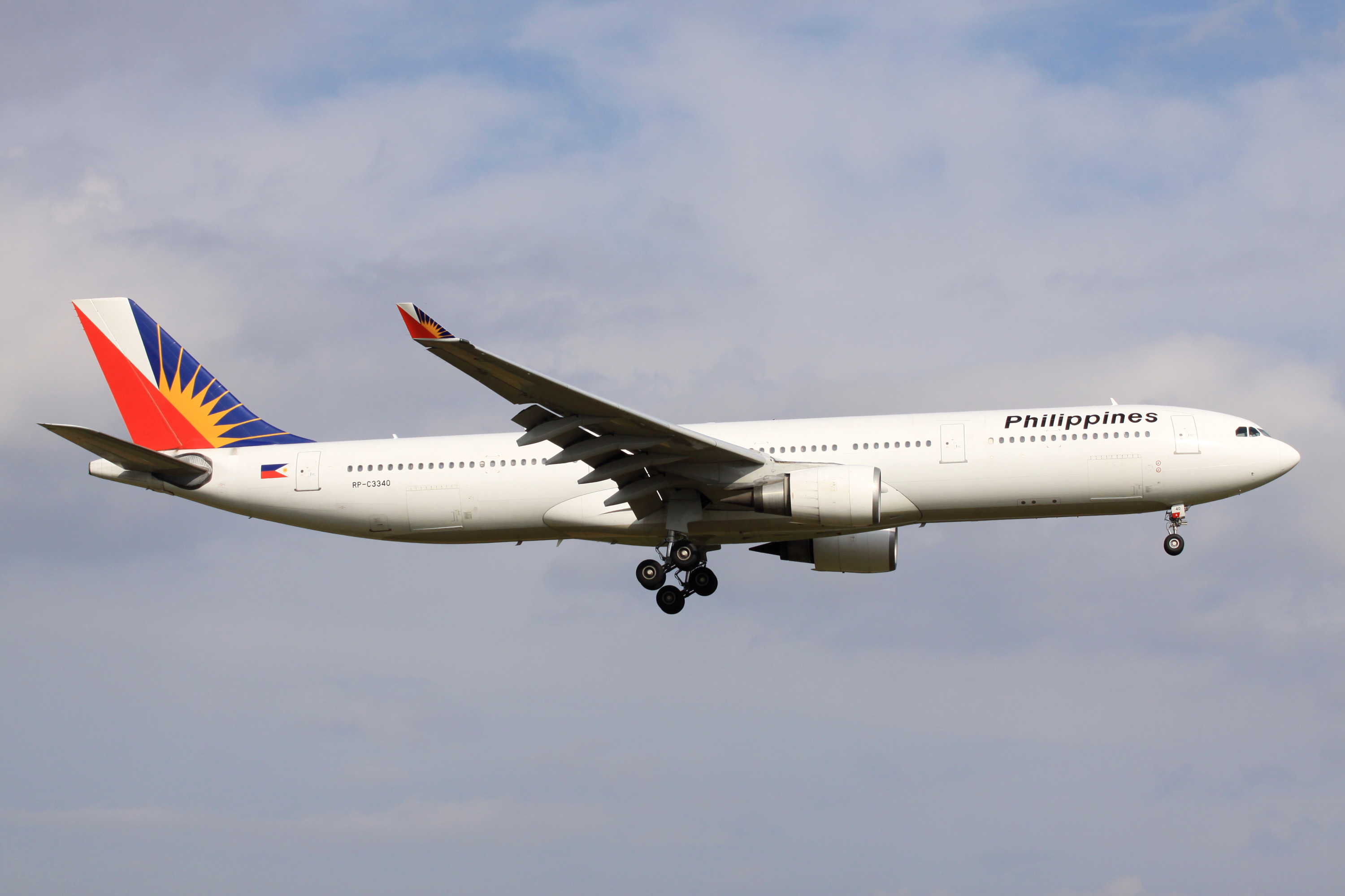
The Philippine Airlines livery (pictured on an Airbus A330-300) features two triangles, one red on the other blue, with an eight-ray sun on the blue triangle of the tail, evoking a sail.

=== A ===
- Abercrombie & Kent: Blue ampersand.
- Air Transat: Blue star.
- Allegiant Air: A sun on top of the "i".
- America Trans Air: Airfield or airport runway approach.

=== C ===
- Canadian North: A silhouette of an inuksuk.
- Czech Airlines: Red diamond.

=== D ===
- Delta Air Lines: Resembles the swept wing appearance of a jet flying overhead. Represents the capital letter "D" of the Greek alphabet, which is delta ∆. The symbol pointed to top right or top left based on livery painting side, resemble the slogan "Onward and Upward", and recent new slogan "Keep Climbing". Nicknamed the Widget, introduced in 1959.

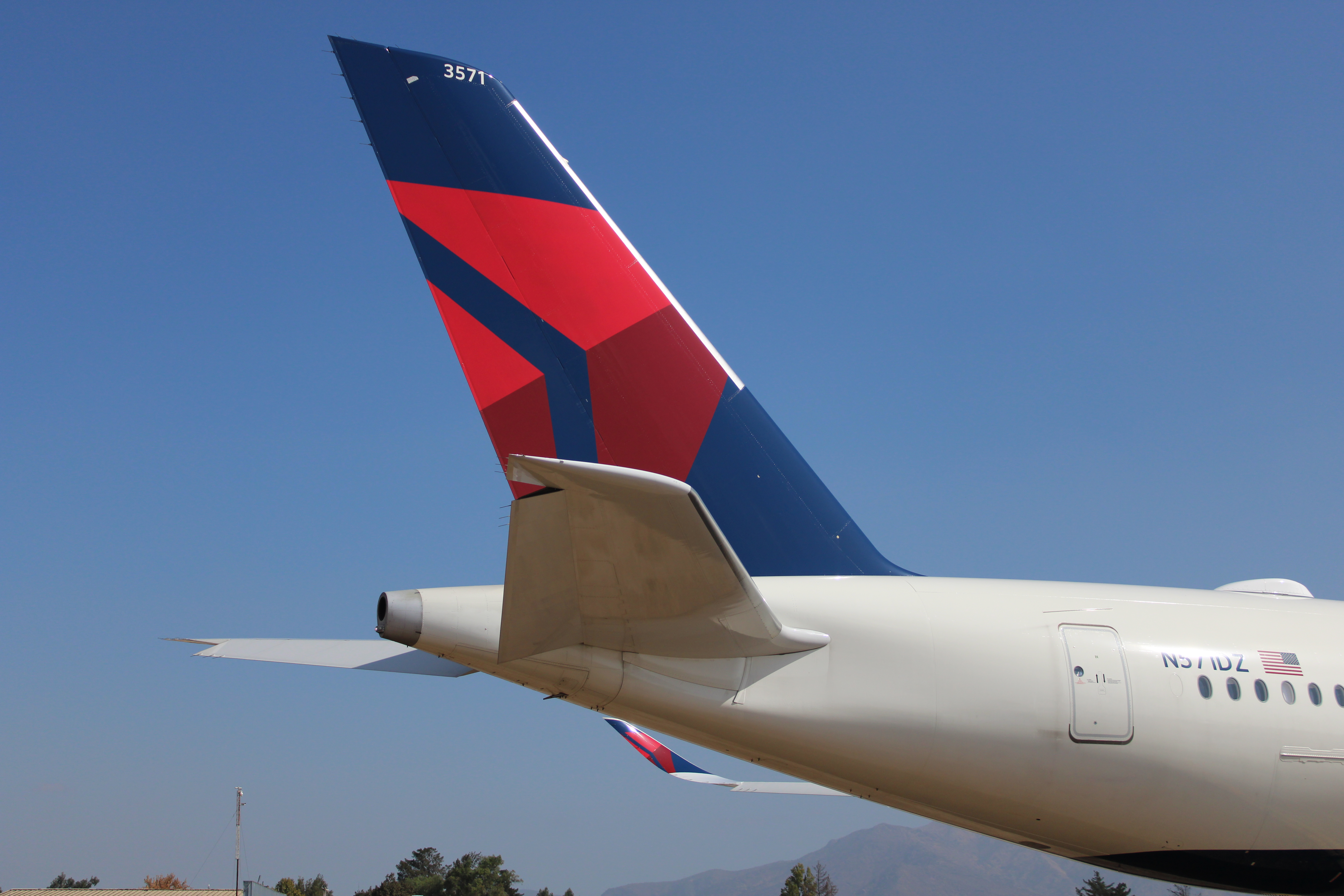
Tail of a Delta Air Lines Airbus A350-941 displaying the logo of the airline.

=== E ===
- Envoy Air: The logotype "envoy" with a red triangle on the letter "y", although Envoy directly use American Eagle livery instead.
- EVA Air: Dark green background with a global logo in orange and green (modified version of the Evergreen Group logo).

=== I ===
- Icelandair: Yellow and orange wings on blue (representing midnight sun, volcanoes and the dark seas around Iceland).

=== M ===
- Malaysia Airlines: Red and blue wau bulan (moon kite), restylised in 1987.
- Mandala Airlines (later known as Tigerair Mandala): Eight-pointed mandala with a five-petaled lotus in its center.
- Merpati Nusantara Airlines: Feathers or wings.

=== N ===
- Northwest Airlines: Compass rose pointing northwest (on the port side – the compass points northeast on the starboard side).
- Nolinor Aviation: Compass rose with the letter "N" on top.

=== O ===
- Olympic Air/Olympic Airlines: Six interlocking rings (originally five; a sixth was added to differentiate itself from the protected Olympic flag).

=== R ===
- Ryanair: Morph between a flying angel and a harp.

=== S ===
- SkyJet Airlines: Blue background with sky and clouds within a star.
- Skymark Airlines: A 5-point star with a blue shape on right side.
- Smartavia (formerly known as Nordavia): 2 paper airplanes stack together, forming a letter "S". As Nordavia, the logo is a snowflake.

=== T ===
- All TUI Group airlines: Red smile design.

=== V ===
- Varig: Compass rose.
- Vietravel Airlines: Paper airplane.

== Colors ==
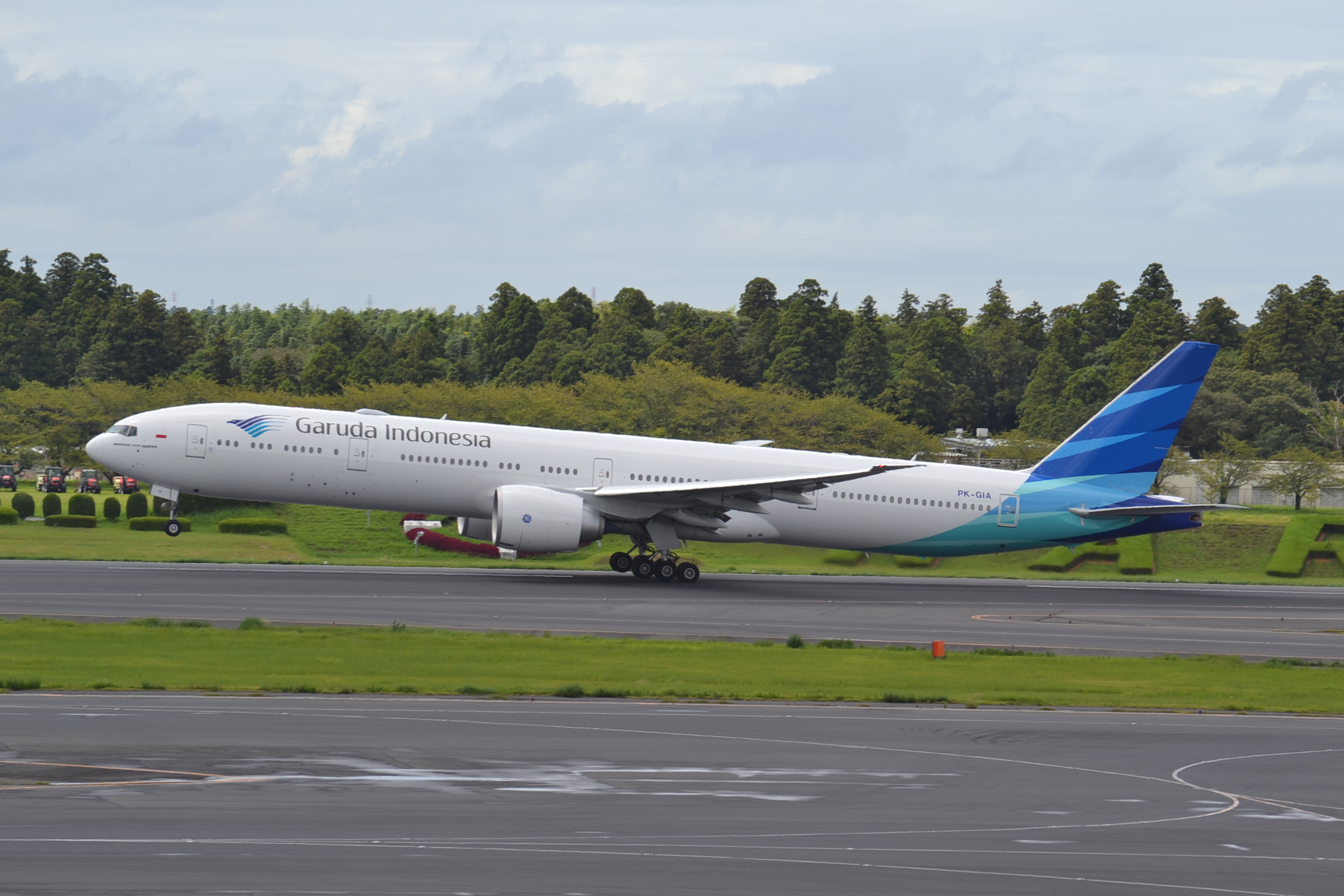
Garuda Indonesia Boeing 777-300ER with blue and green livery

=== A ===
- Air Do: Airlines' lettering on top of yellow and sky blue wave in vertical stabilizer.
- Asiana Airlines: Cross-diagonal shades, combining gray, red, yellow and blue.
- AirAsia: Has the words AirAsia.com in white on a red background which covers most of the fuselage.

=== E ===
- EasyJet: White and bright orange.
- Eurowings: Disco Red (8F174F), Magenta Daisy (B4175E), Ocean Wave (089BC9), Journey (7BCBE2) and Ashen (C8C4C3)

=== G ===
- Garuda Indonesia: Cross-diagonal shades of blue and green.
- GMG Airlines: Butterfly wings in 64 colors.

=== I ===
- IndiGo: Blue and indigo color stripes.

=== J ===
- JetBlue: White and shades of blue, depending on the tail logo.

=== P ===
- Peach Aviation: Airline's name on vertical stabilizer on top of pink and purple wave.

=== S ===
- Scoot: The logo was "Scoot" on a yellow circle with the tilted "t" outside. The livery consisted of the airline's website in the fuselage and airline's name on the vertical stabilizer, on top of an orange wave.
- Solaseed Air: The logo is a 3D green fluid with 2 dots, indicating a smile.
- Southwest Airlines: Yellow, red and royal blue livery.
- SpiceJet: 15 yellow dots on a red background
- Spirit Airlines: Bright yellow, "sketch-like" black letters on body and tail, "Home of the Bare Fare®" on engines.
- StarFlyer: Pitched black livery with white wave in the bottom on the fuselage, with opposite coloring on both side of the vertical stabilizer and wingtip.
- Swoop: Magenta stripe from name to tail.

=== V ===
- Viva: Green, white and red dots on tail.

== Legendary figures ==
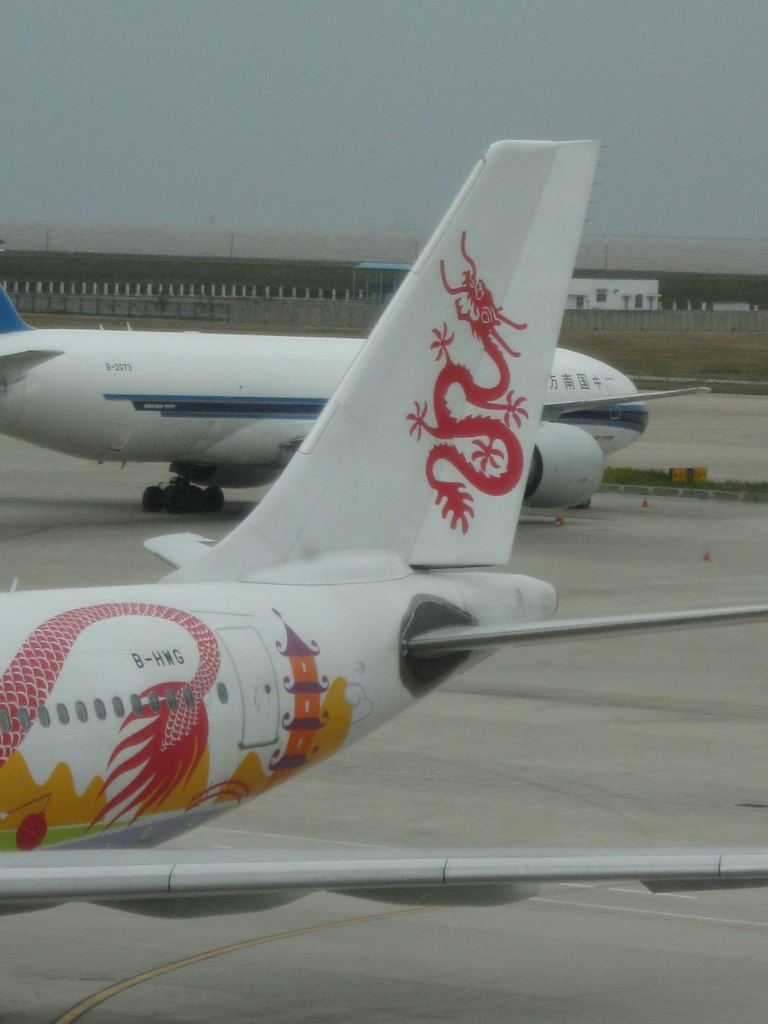
Dragon on a Dragonair Airbus A330-300

- Aeroméxico: Quetzalcoatl, as a special livery for a Boeing 787-9 Registered XA-ADL, Baptized under the name of Quetzalcoatl.
- Air China: Phoenix, in the form of the letters "VIP".
- Air India: Air India's official logo was a centaur since the 1960s. After its merger with Indian Airlines in 2009, the airline changed its logo from the centaur to the swan with the Konark Sun Temple's wheel, existing until 2023.
- Dragonair (later Cathay Dragon): Dragon (with three claws on its left side, one on its right). The dragon was later placed behind the cockpit after its rebranding as Cathay Dragon
- Druk Air: Dragon.
- EgyptAir: Horus.
- Garuda Indonesia: Garuda holybird of Hinduism and redefined as the national emblem of Indonesia.
- Iran Air: Griffin.
- Spirit of Manila Airlines: Sarimanok, a legendary bird of the Philippines.
- Srilankan Airlines: 'Monara' from the mythical Dandumonara Yanthra (a flying machine that resembles a peacock).
- Varig: Varig's first logo was an image of Icaro and its wings. After the adoption of the "star" (in fact it was a stylished compass) the Icaro figure was maintained on the fuselage of the airplanes, near the front door.

== Unpopular designs ==
British Airways introduced unusual tailfin designs in 1997. These airline liveries and logos were intended to make the airline's branding more cosmopolitan and were described as "arty" and "ethnic". They were unpopular with many customers and also caused confusion for ground controllers who had more difficulty recognising aircraft with the British Airways ethnic liveries to give clear taxiing instructions. Despite the £60 million expense of this livery, it was replaced completely in 2001 and the airline has now returned to a more traditional design based upon the Union Flag.

Brussels Airlines' first logo was a stylised letter B composed of 13 dots resembling a runway. This was thought to be unlucky, and protests by superstitious passengers caused the airline to add another dot. Later in 2021, they changed the airline logo and livery, which consisted of dots in various sizes in the logo and colors in the livery.

All Nippon Airways (later Solaseed Air, Air Do, Skymark, Scoot, China Airlines, T'way Air, and Garuda Indonesia) have revealed jets with Pokémon liveries, which they referred collectively as Pokémon Jet. All Nippon Airways also released special liveries for specific brands and jets such as "Flying Honu" on an entire Airbus A380 fleet, Star Wars and Demon Slayer: Kimetsu no Yaiba on selected Boeing jets. The tradition also occurred on ANA's low cost subsidiary - Peach Aviation with their jets having some brands put in the bottom row of the plane, such as Soaring Sky! Pretty Cure or Japanese band Back Number.

Japan Airlines' low cost, long haul subsidiary Zipair Tokyo changed the livery with geometric design on the vertical stabilizer instead of the letter "Z" on the name, while the line on windows and the "Zipair" name still kept. The reason for the change is to avoid misunderstandings, as the letter has been used as a military symbol by the Russian Armed Forces during Russia's invasion of Ukraine.

Vietnam Airlines' low cost subsidiary Pacific Airlines introduced a new logo after the split from the Jetstar brand, which consisted of 3 tailfins stacked each other in an asymmetric hexagon shape. The livery featured a portion of the logo on the tail section.
