= Spirit Air =

Spirit Air may refer to:

- Spirit Airlines, a former American ultra low-cost airline
- Spirit AeroSystems, an aerospace parts manufacturer in Wichita, Kansas
- Spirit of Manila Airlines, a former Philippine low-cost airline

== See also ==
- Air spirit, a sky deity
- Ekendriya, beings in Jainism sometimes said to be spirits of the air or wind
