= Best Air =

Bangladeshi airline

IATA	ICAO	Call sign
5Q	BEA	—
- Founded: 2007
- Ceased operations: 2009
- Operating bases: Shahjalal International Airport
- Fleet size: 2
- Destinations: 7
- Parent company: Destiny Multipurpose Co-Operative Society Ltd
- Headquarters: Dhaka, Bangladesh
- Website: www.bestairbd.com

Best Air was an airline in Bangladesh serving both domestic and international destinations from Shahjalal International Airport.

== History ==
Best Air's parent company Best Aviation, started operations in 1999 as a Helicopter operator. Best Aviation started its journey as a freighter airline in 2000. Best Air obtained a license in 2006 from the Civil Aviation Authority of Bangladesh to operate passenger service in domestic and international sectors. The company was formed in 2007 as a joint venture between Best Aviation and a Kuwait-based company, Aqeeq Aviation Holding which controls a 70% share of the airline.

Best Air started with a Boeing 737 to operate from Shahjalal International Airport in Dhaka to one regional domestic destination, Chittagong. Best Air acquired an McDonnell Douglas MD-83 on lease and operated to new destinations such as Dubai, Kuala Lumpur, Singapore and Bangkok.

Best Air suspended its operations in 2009, due to extraordinarily high fuel costs. Best Air had announced that they have received a large investment from Destiny Group LTD of Bangladesh and will restart operations on 26 March 2011, but did not. They intended to re-enter the domestic market with three new ATR 72 aircraft. Plans called for the acquisition of three A320 aircraft later in the year, followed by the Airbus A330 or Boeing 777 for long haul routes in the near future, all of which never materialized.

In 2010 Best Aviation sold 80% of its shares in Best Air to Destiny Multipurpose Co-Operative Society Ltd.

== Fleet ==
The Best Air fleet consisted of the following aircraft:

Best Air fleet
Aircraft	Total	Notes
Boeing 737-200	1	
McDonnell Douglas MD-83	1	operated by TransGlobal Airways
Total	2	

== See also ==
- List of defunct airlines of Bangladesh
