= Philippine Aerotransport =

Philippine airline (1975–1980)

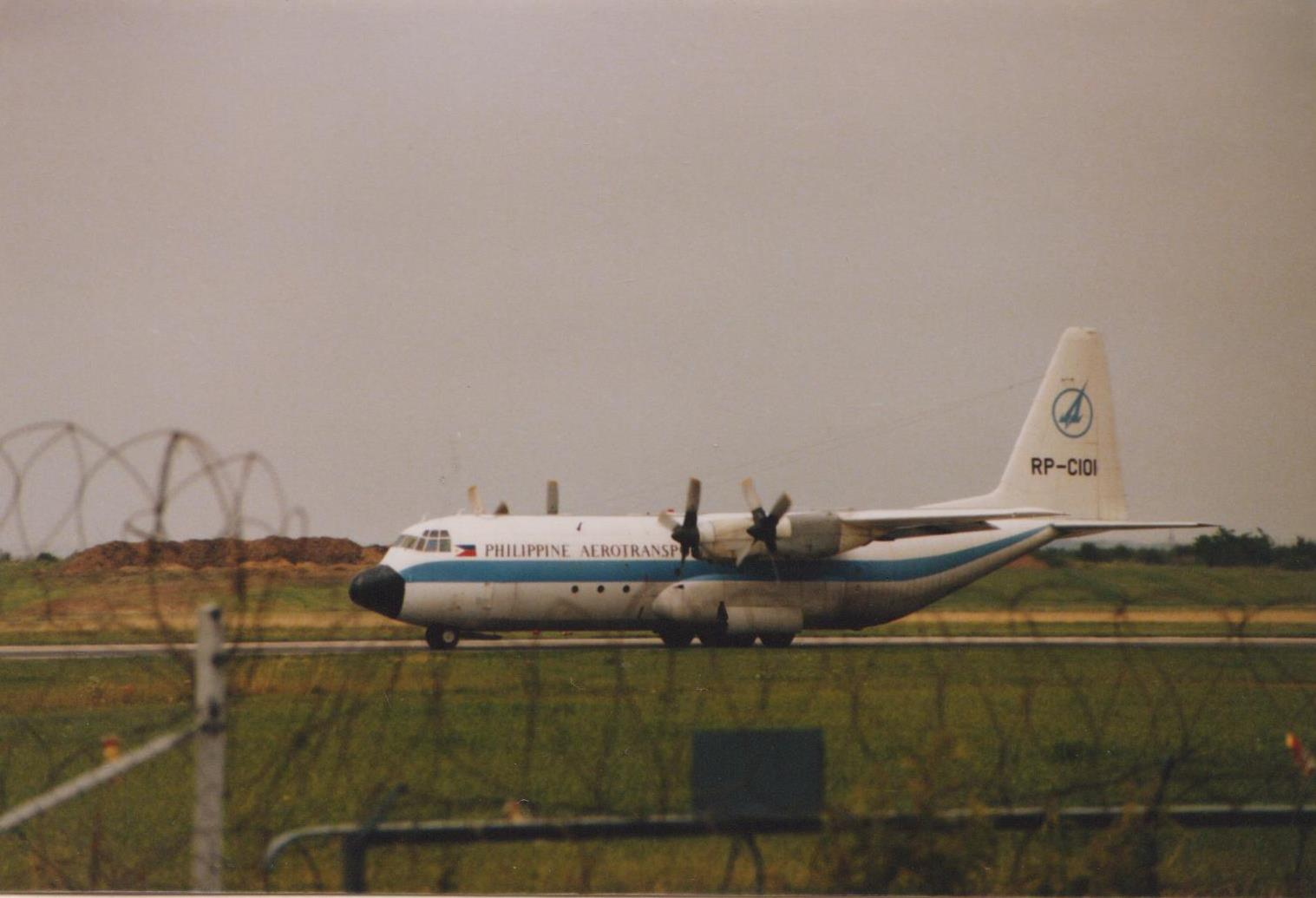
IATA	ICAO	Call sign
PN	—	—
- Founded: May 24, 1975
- Commenced operations: December 1975
- Ceased operations: February 1, 1980

Philippine Aero Transport Inc. (PATI), mainly known as Philippine Aerotransport was a Philippine airline that operated from 1975 to 1980. The airline operated as a airline subsidiary of the Philippine Aerospace Development Corporation and served routes both domestic and international. In 1988, the airline was fully dissolved.

== History ==
The airline was established on May 24, 1975 as a subsidiary of the Philippine Aerospace Development Corporation. It commenced operations on in December 1975 and was allowed to operate domestic and international cargo services by 1977, as well as the authorized usage of the Lockheed L-100 Hercules. In 1980, the airline shut down, and in 1988, the airline was fully dissolved. The airline's operations was absorbed by Philippine Airlines.

The airline operated out of Manila International Airport (now Ninoy Aquino International Airport) and serviced both domestic and international routes. The airline operated multiple domestic routes out of Manila International Airport, including Cebu, Puerto Princessa, and Davao. The airline also operated international flights.

The airline served rural places as well, providing routes to remote communities and islands with their aircraft. However, these operations were absorbed by Philippine Airlines by mid-1978.

== Fleet ==
The airline operated the BN-2 Islander, as well as the Lockheed L-100 for cargo.

Fleet Of Philippine Aerotransport
Aircraft	Total	Introduced	Retired	Notes
Britten-Norman BN-2 Islander	?	1975	1980	3 crashed as RP-C2136, RP-C2135, and RP-C2142.
Lockheed L-100 Hercules	?	1975	1980	

== Accidents and incidents ==
There have been 3 accidents and incidents involving the airline

- On December 21, 1975, a BN-2 Islander registered as RP-C2136, crashed in Tacloban, Leyte, killing all 9 occupants onboard.
- On January 8, 1976, a BN-2 Islander registered as RP-C2135, crashed on Mactan Island, killing all 7 occupants onboard.
- On May 5, 1976, a BN-2 Islander registered as RP-C2142, crashed on Camiguin Island, killing 4 of the 8 occupants onboard.

== See also ==
- List of defunct airlines of the Philippines
- Philippine Aerospace Development Corporation
