= Mindanao Express =

Airline of the Philippines

IATA	ICAO	Call sign
CD	-	-
- Commenced operations: October 23, 1996
- Ceased operations: June 16, 2000
- Operating bases: General Santos International Airport
- Headquarters: General Santos, Philippines
- Key people: Alberto D. Lina (Chairman)

Mindanao Express was an airline based at General Santos International Airport. Formed in 1996, the airline flew to destinations throughout Mindanao and Visayas, as well as a limited international network to Manado, Indonesia, and Sandakan, Malaysia. It was a subsidiary of Corporate Air.

President Fidel V. Ramos appointed Mindanao Express as the second Philippine flag carrier to the BIMP-EAGA. The airline's first flight was on 23 October 1996. By June 1997, the airline had already flown 4,277 passengers, and 480,267.2 pounds of cargo. After the withdrawal of Philippine Airlines' inter-island routes during 1998–1999, Mindanao Express gained 100% market share on some routes.

Operations were suspended on 16 June 2000, citing the crisis in Mindanao.

== Destinations ==
The airline flew a route network primarily serving major cities and towns in Mindanao, and later in the Visayas. As the second flag carrier to the BIMP-EAGA, the airline also flew from Zamboanga to Sandakan, Malaysia, and General Santos City to Manado, Indonesia.

Country	City	Airport	Notes	Refs
Philippines	Cagayan de Oro	Lumbia Airfield		
Philippines	Camiguin	Camiguin Airport		
Philippines	Cotabato	Cotabato Airport		
Philippines	Cebu City	Mactan–Cebu International Airport		
Philippines	Jolo	Jolo Airport		
Philippines	Kalibo	Kalibo International Airport		
Philippines	General Santos	General Santos International Airport	Hub	
Philippines	Zamboanga	Zamboanga International Airport		
Philippines	Tacloban	Daniel Z. Romualdez Airport		
Philippines	Tandag	Tandag Airport		
Philippines	Tawi-Tawi	Sanga-Sanga Airport		
Indonesia	Manado	Sam Ratulangi International Airport		
Malaysia	Sandakan	Sandakan Airport		

== Fleet ==
The fleet in 1997 was:

- 4 x Beech C99
- 2 x Beech 1900C
