= Fil-Asian Airways =

IATA	ICAO	Call sign
R1	RDV	FILASIAN
- Founded: 2011
- Ceased operations: 2014
- Hubs: Mactan–Cebu International Airport; Zamboanga International Airport; Ninoy Aquino International Airport
- Fleet size: 2
- Headquarters: Cebu City Paranaque City
- Key people: N/A (CEO)

Fil-Asian Airways, formerly Mid-Sea Express, was a Cebu-based airline with AOC issued by CAAP. It was formed in 2011 and ceased operating in 2014. Mid-Sea Express started as air charter operator and non-scheduled air taxi headquartered at Mactan–Cebu International Airport in Lapu-Lapu City in Central Visayas, in the Philippines. As Fil-Asian Airways, its slogan was "The Asian experience". The airline was operated from major airports such as Mactan–Cebu International Airport in Cebu, Francisco Bangoy International Airport in Davao City and Zamboanga International Airport.

== History ==
=== As Mid-Sea Express ===
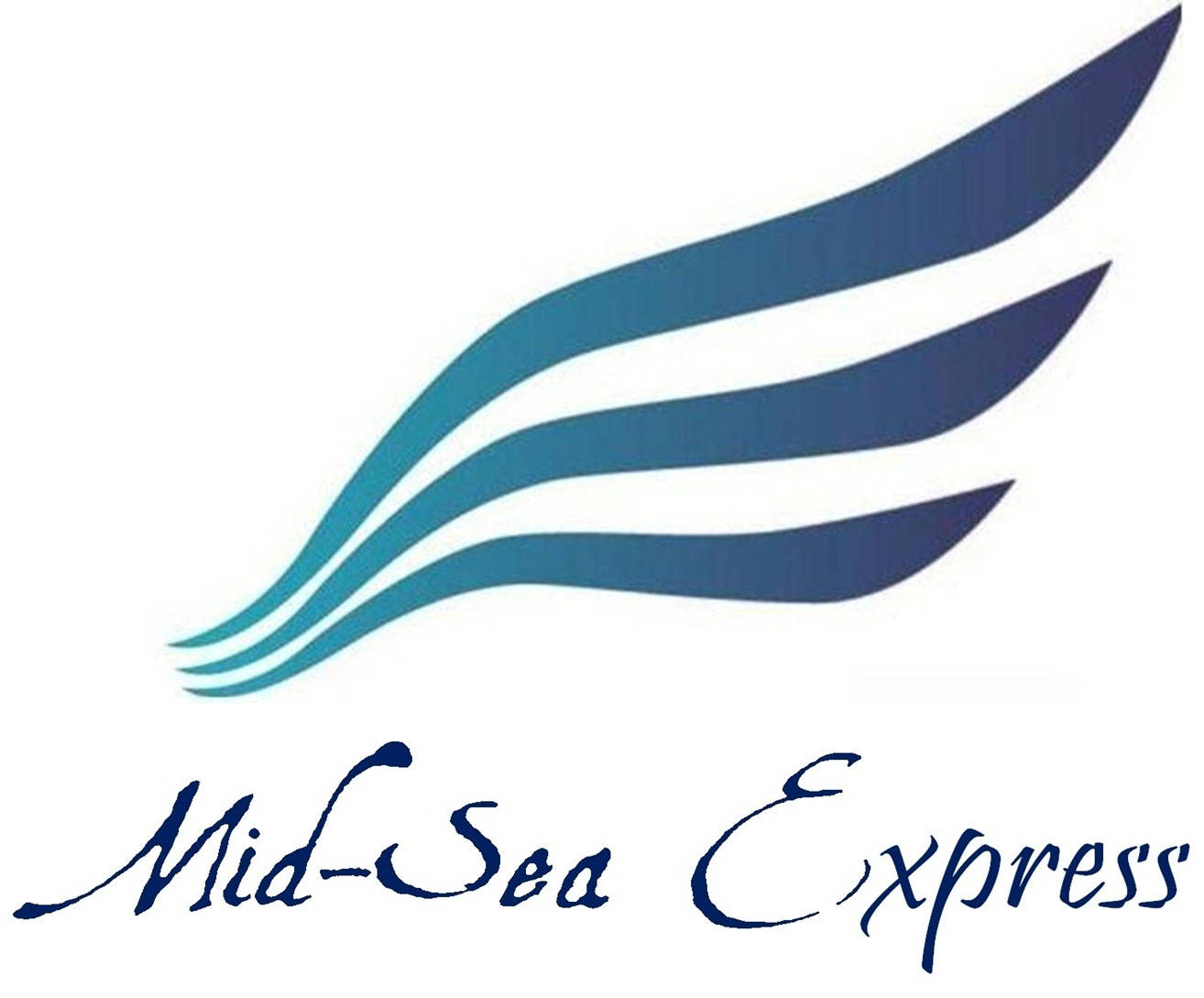

Mid-SEA Express (MSE) takes its name from the Middle of South East Asia, the region in which it operates and founded by Capt. Ronan D. Villanueva. MSE began operating as Island Helicopter Services, which was established in 2008. In 2011, after seeing the need to service the neighboring islands around Cebu, Mid-Sea Express began operating unscheduled air transportation, and acquired an aircraft with a Short Take-off and Landing Capability, an 8-seater BN-2A Islander. Starting a daily flight schedule from Cebu to Tagbilaran City, Bohol. A month later, Cebu–Bantayan Island was also opened. Then, it was successively followed by flights to Camiguin and Siquijor islands utilizing a 21-seater British Aerospace Jetstream 32EP aircraft. MSE also opened routes from Cebu to Tandag, Bislig, Guiuan, and vice versa, to serve foreign and local travelers, focusing solely on routes which were previously not serviced via air travel.

In 2011, the Mid-Sea Express began operations for non-scheduled air transportation, initially covering Cebu-Tagbilaran as its launching route. It launched an 8-seater Britten-Norman Islander which proved convenient and affordable to passengers in terms of time and cost. Tagbilaran City is a short distance to Lapu-Lapu City. In the month following its launch, it began flights to Bantayan Island in northwestern Cebu. MSE also opened routes from Cebu to Tandag, Bislig, and Guiuan vice versa to serve foreign and local travelers. MSE solely serve routes which were not accessible via air travel.

Mid-SEA Express (MSE) represents its name as Middle of South East Asia founded by Capt. Ronan D. Villanueva, that started its operation as Island Helicopter Services, that was established in the year 2008. After seeing the need to service the neighboring islands around Cebu, he acquired an aircraft with a Short Take-off and Landing Capability, a BN-2A Islander. Starting a daily flight schedule from Cebu to Tagbilaran City, Bohol, then a month after, Cebu– Bantayan Island was also opened. Then, it was successively followed by flights to Camiguin and Siquijor islands.

The re-opening of this new routes has further developed its eco-tourism potential and further improved the access not only for the foreign tourist but also for the local Filipino communities. All these air services further boost tourist arrival and provide a faster convenient air access. Mid-Sea Express’ vision of "Bridging the Island" has been achieved through their consistent adding of unserved routes to both Filipino citizens and foreign travelers alike.

The goal of Mid-Sea Express was to further promote the tourism potential of smaller islands while still serving the routes and destinations that are in high demand. With the large and ever-increasing tourist demand in Bohol, the Cebu-Bohol flights are helping increase the island's chances of making a name among the world's travelers, just as Boracay recently did in a recent worldwide publication.

MSE expanded its operation and added new routes to connect Cebu-Tagbilaran City, Bohol-Davao and Cebu-Bohol, Bohol-Cagayan de Oro, utilizing a 21-seater British Aerospace (BAE) Jetstream 32EP aircraft. With the increasing demand of passengers traveling to destinations solely served by MSE and with high demand of cargoes needed to be transported from far flung areas to main islands. By April 2012, the airline temporarily ceased its international operations as it prepared for the relaunch of flights under the new brand using a bigger aircraft to accommodate more passengers and cargoes at the same time.

=== As Fil-Asian Airways ===
In 2013, Mid-Sea Express re-branded itself to become Fil-Asian Airways under new management. The new airline is set to relaunch flights on old routes of Mid-Sea Express using bigger aircraft. On March 27, 2013, its first commercial flight as Fil-Asian Airways commenced between Zamboanga and Cebu.

== Destinations ==
- Philippines
  - Cebu Main hub
  - Cotabato
  - Davao
  - Gensan
  - Masbate
  - Ormoc
  - Romblon
  - Tagbilaran
  - Tandag
  - Zamboanga

== Fleet ==
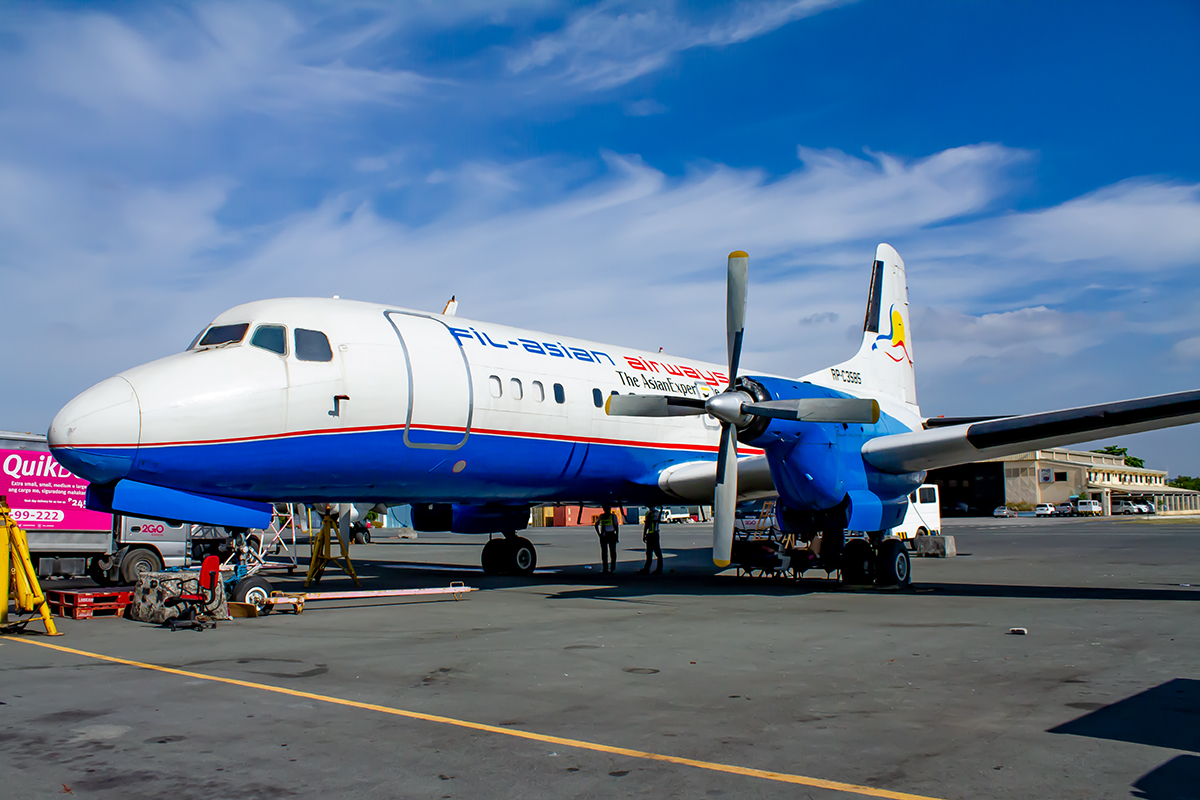
Fil-Asian Airways YS-11-500

- 2x NAMC YS-11-500
- 1x Bell 206
