= Corporate Air (Philippines) =

1995–2008 airline in the Philippines

- Founded: 1995
- Ceased operations: 2008
- Operating bases: Ninoy Aquino International Airport (Manila)
- Fleet size: See Fleet below
- Destinations: See Destinations below
- Parent company: Corporate Air
- Headquarters: Billings, Montana, United States

Corporate Air was an airline based in Billings, Montana, United States. It has since ceased operations in its Manila, Philippines base. It was established in 1995 and operates airbridge and feeder services between Subic and Davao City, with stops in Manila and Cebu City on behalf of FedEx. It also operates scheduled passenger services. In the past, it flew passengers between Manila and Baguio. Its main base was Subic Bay International Airport. Corporate Air Inc. ceased all Philippine operations in 2008.

== Fleet ==
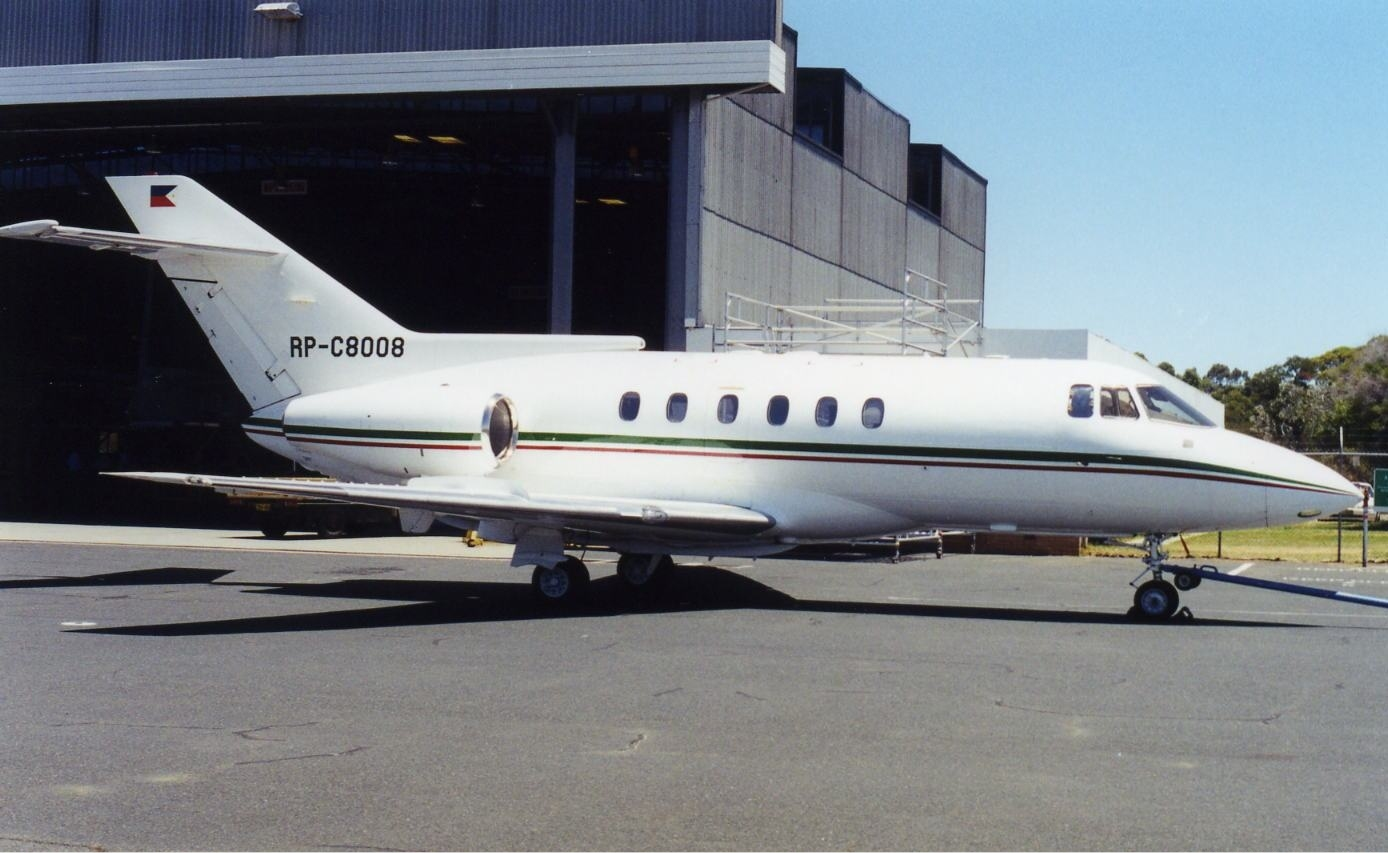
Corporate Air BAe 125 at Perth Airport in 2001

The Corporate Air fleet consists of the following aircraft (at March 2007):

=== Previously operated ===
- 3 Cessna 208 Caravan

At January 2005 the airline also operated:

- 2 De Havilland Canada DHC-6 Twin Otter 300
- 3 Cessna 208A Caravan I
- 1 Dornier 228-200
