= Pan Pacific Airlines =

Airline of the Philippines

IATA	ICAO	Call sign
8Y	AAV	ASTRO-PHIL
- Founded: 1973 (as Astro Air International)
- Commenced operations: 27 April 2017; 9 years ago
- Ceased operations: 4 May 2022; 4 years ago
- AOC #: 2012049
- Hubs: Cebu; Kalibo
- Fleet size: 1 (2022)
- Destinations: 5
- Headquarters: Unit 1401, 4th Floor, ASEANA 3 Building, Aseana Avenue corner Macapagal Boulevard, Parañaque, Metro Manila, Philippines
- Key people: Arturo M. Alejandrino (President, Chief Operations Officer)
- Website: panpacificair.com

Astro Air International, Inc., doing business as Pan Pacific Airlines, was a full-service airline operating from 2017 to 2022, based in the Philippines.

It was established in 1973 under the name Astro Air International but was renamed as Spirit of Manila Airlines in 2011 and ceased commercial flights after three months of operations. In 2016, the airline relaunched under the current brand after it began operating to serve the South Korean market. The airline commenced operations on April 27, 2017, with its inaugural flight between Kalibo and Seoul. Its current main hubs are Mactan–Cebu International Airport and Kalibo International Airport with flights going to Seoul, Busan and Muan. However, as of December 2022, the airline does not operate any aircraft and therefore has stopped operating flights as well.

== History ==
In 1973, Filipino-Chinese entrepreneur Donald Dee secured a commercial airline license and registered an airline company under the name Astro Air International. The company previously did business under the name Spirit of Manila Airlines from 2011 to 2012, flying from Clark International Airport in Angeles, Pampanga to Taipei Taoyuan International Airport in Taiwan using a fleet of two McDonnell Douglas MD-83 planes and a leased Boeing 737-300. The airline ceased operations after only a few months after it failed to secure an air operator's certificate.

After it received backing from South Korean investors, the company restarted operations in 2016 under its present name and with the goal of connecting the South Korean market with tourist destinations Boracay and Cebu in the Philippines. On April 27, 2017, the inaugural flight between Kalibo and Seoul commenced using an Airbus A320-232.

In 2019, the airline ranked fourth among Philippine carriers in terms of the number of international passengers. It flew 250,977 passengers out of a total of 12,423,134 flown by the top three Philippine carriers: Philippine Airlines, Cebu Pacific, and Philippines AirAsia.

The airline suspended all flight operation after 4 May 2022.

== Destinations ==
Alternative livery still seen on some planes

As of January 2020, Pan Pacific Airlines served the following destinations:

Country	City	Airport	Notes	Refs
Philippines	Cebu	Mactan–Cebu International Airport	Hub	
Philippines	Davao	Francisco Bangoy International Airport	Cargo	
Philippines	General Santos	General Santos International Airport	Cargo	
Philippines	Kalibo	Kalibo International Airport	Hub	
Philippines	Puerto Princesa	Puerto Princesa International Airport	Cargo	
South Korea	Busan	Gimhae International Airport	Passenger	
South Korea	Muan	Muan International Airport	Passenger	
South Korea	Seoul	Incheon International Airport	Passenger	

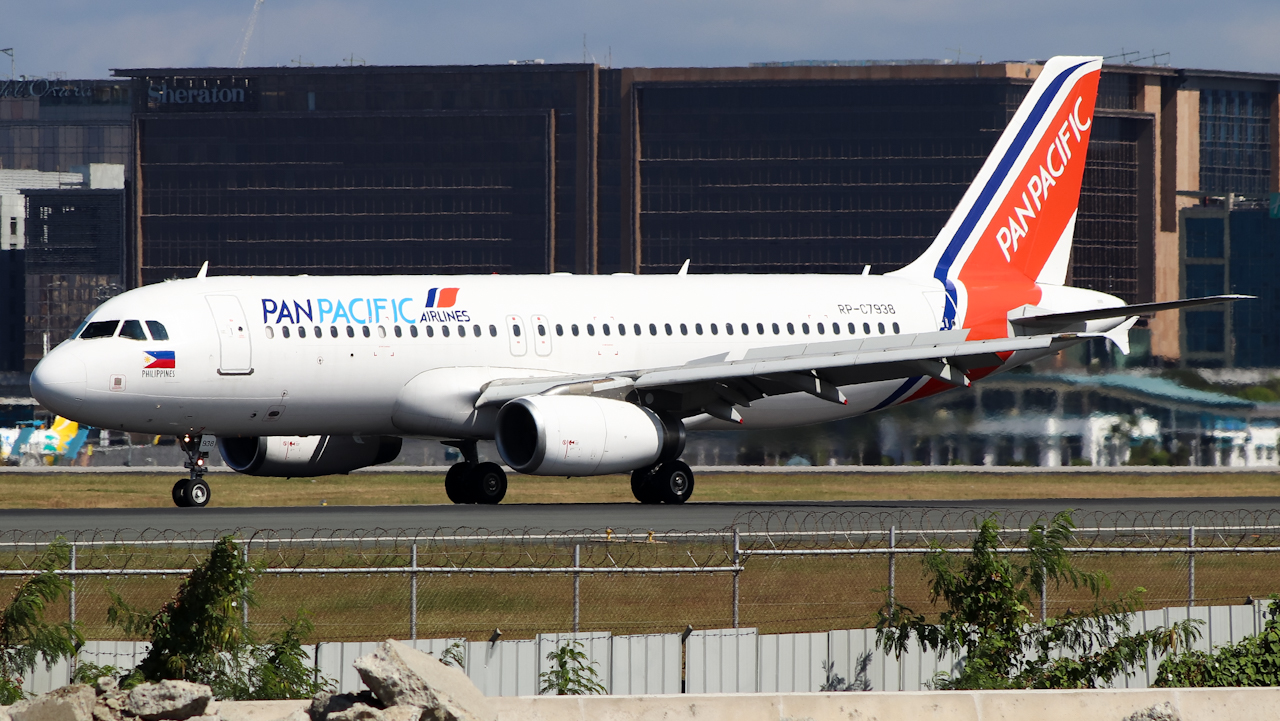
An Airbus A320-200

== Fleet ==
During late 2019, the airline had five Airbus A320s. However, as of May 2022 before ceasing flight operations, Pan Pacific Airlines operated one aircraft.

Pan Pacific Airlines
Aircraft	In service	Orders	Passengers
Airbus A320-200	1	—	180
Total	1	—	
