= TransGlobal Airways =

Cargo airline

IATA	ICAO	Call sign
T7	TCU	TRANSGLOBAL
- Founded: 2005
- Ceased operations: unknown
- Hubs: Clark International Airport
- Frequent-flyer program: Fly high
- Fleet size: 2
- Destinations: 7
- Headquarters: Angeles City, Philippines
- Key people: ??

TransGlobal Airways was a cargo airline based in Clark International Airport, Philippines. The airline flies from Angeles-Clark to China and Taiwan and to key points in the Philippines, and operates regular charter flights to the Middle East in co-operation with Kang Pacific Airlines. The Airline has also expressed their intentions to fly passenger flights to South Korea with a fleet of MD-82 and MD-83 aircraft.

== History ==
The cargo airline started operations in July 2005 with an initial two flights every week between Clark and Zhuhai in China utilizing the Boeing 737-200F aircraft. Zhuhai is located in the Pearl River delta near Macau. TransGlobal was the third Cargo Carrier based in Clark at the time.

On June 28, 2005, TransGlobal Airways chose to spend US$10 million worth of investments in the next five years for its operations at the Clark, TransGlobal planned to start operations the next month with a maiden flight between Clark and the Zhuhai Special Economic Zone, near Macau and Hong Kong. The contract also stipulated that the air cargo firm would build its own hangar inside the aviation complex to complement operations in Clark.

On December 27, 2005, TransGlobal Airways expanded operations at Clark International Airport, investing at least US$12 million in facilities.

On June 6, 2008, TransGlobal Airways launched its maiden flight to the Middle East from Clark. The flight touched down in Fujairah on the east coast of the United Arab Emirates.

TGA operated Boeing 737-200F aircraft. TGA also supplies ACMI Cargo aircraft to other airlines on a worldwide basis. TGA currently operates ACMI for HeavyLift Cargo Airlines of Australia.

== Destinations ==
Currently TransGlobal Airways operates cargo flights to the following destinations:

=== Philippines ===
- Clark Freeport Zone (Clark International Airport) - Main Hub
- Cebu (Mactan–Cebu International Airport)

=== People's Republic of China ===
- Xiamen (Xiamen International Airport)
- Zhuhai (Zhuhai International Airport)

=== Republic of China (Taiwan) ===
- Taipei (Taiwan Taoyuan International Airport)

=== United Arab Emirates ===
- Fujairah (Fujairah International Airport)

=== Bangladesh ===
- Dhaka (Shahjalal International Airport)

== Fleet ==
The TransGlobal Airways fleet consisted of the following aircraft (as of July 2012):

TransGlobal Airways Cargo Fleet
Total	Freight (Tons)	Routes	
Boeing 737-200C	1	15 tons	Domestic, Intra-Asia, Charter, ACMI.
