= Spirit of Manila Airlines =

Low-cost airline in the Philippines

IATA	ICAO	Call sign
SM	MNP	MANILA SKY
- Founded: 2008
- Commenced operations: October 2011
- Ceased operations: January 2012
- Operating bases: Clark International Airport
- Headquarters: Pasay, Philippines
- Key people: Basilio P. Reyes (President and CEO); Jaime M. Matibag (Managing Director); Juanito G. Ramos Jr. (COO)
- Website: www.spiritofmanilaairlines.com

Spirit of Manila Airlines Corporation, operated as Spirit of Manila Airlines, was a low-cost airline from October 2011 to January 2012, based in Roxas Sea Front Garden in Pasay, Philippines. Its main hub was Clark International Airport. The airline's tagline/slogan was: "I am going home".

== History ==
After the airline was established in 2008, operations between Clark International Airport and Taipei began in October 2011 with two flights each week. The airline soon developed a poor reputation as low passenger numbers led to it delaying or cancelling flights. It ceased operations in 2012 after only three months of flights.

In 2016, its Airline Operator Certificate, a license to operate an airline under Philippine laws, was resurrected under a different brand name, Pan Pacific Airlines.

== Destinations ==
Spirit of Manila Airlines served the following destinations:

- Philippines
  - Angeles City - Clark International Airport, main hub
- Republic of China (Taiwan)
  - Taipei - Taiwan Taoyuan International Airport
- Thailand
  - Bangkok - Suvarnabhumi Airport

== Fleet ==
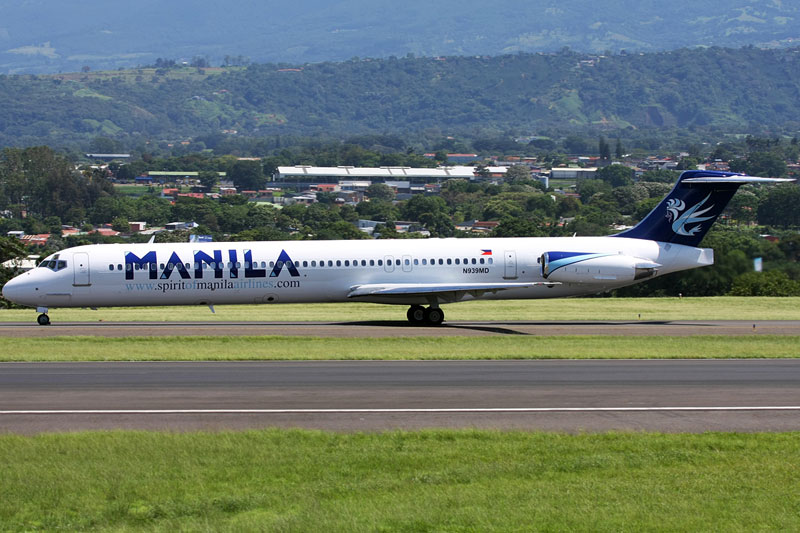
Spirit of Manila Airlines McDonnell Douglas MD-83

The Spirit of Manila Airlines fleet consisted of the following aircraft:

Spirit of Manila Airlines fleet
Aircraft	Total	Passengers (Economy)
Boeing 737-300	1	148
McDonnell Douglas MD-83	2	147
Total	3	
