= Air Philippines Flight 541 =

2000 aviation accident in the Philippines

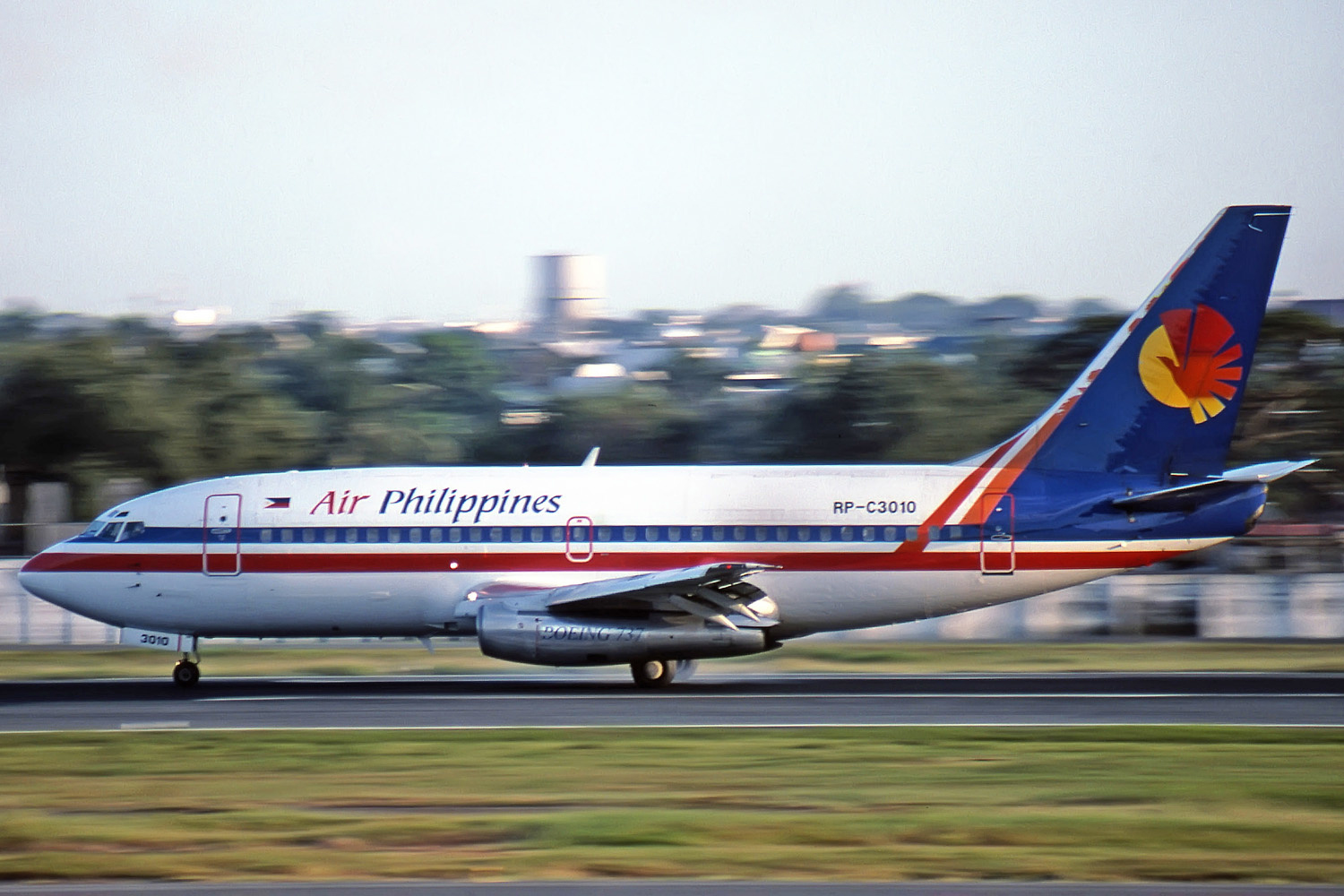
- RP-C3010, the aircraft involved in the accident, seen in January 2000

Accident
- Date: April 19, 2000
- Summary: Controlled flight into terrain
- Site: Samal, Davao del Norte; 7°11′9″N 125°42′25″E

Aircraft
- Aircraft type: Boeing 737-2H4
- Operator: Air Philippines
- IATA flight No.: 2P541
- ICAO flight No.: GAP541
- Call sign: ORIENT PACIFIC 541
- Registration: RP-C3010
- Flight origin: Ninoy Aquino International Airport
- Destination: Francisco Bangoy International Airport
- Occupants: 131
- Passengers: 124
- Crew: 7
- Fatalities: 131
- Survivors: 0

Air Philippines Flight 541 was a scheduled domestic flight operated by Air Philippines from Ninoy Aquino International Airport in Metro Manila to Francisco Bangoy International Airport in Davao City. On April 19, 2000, the Boeing 737-200 crashed south of Davao City while on approach to the airport, killing all 124 passengers and 7 crew members. It remains the deadliest air disaster in the Philippines, surpassing the 1998 crash of Cebu Pacific Flight 387, and the third-deadliest accident involving the Boeing 737-200, after Mandala Airlines Flight 091 (which crashed five years later), and Indian Airlines Flight 113 (which crashed nearly twelve years prior).

== Aircraft and crew ==
=== Aircraft ===
The aircraft, a Boeing 737-2H4, registration RP-C3010 and previously owned by Southwest Airlines, was first delivered in February 1978 and was sold to Air Philippines 20 years later.

=== Passengers and crew ===
In command of the flight was Captain Estraton Catipay - the youngest pilot to have served for Philippine Airlines in the 1960s. He also worked for airlines in the United States such as Pan Am, Delta, TWA and Eastern Airlines, and in other major airlines in Asia and London such as Malaysia Air.

There were 124 passengers (19 of them children) and 7 crew members, totalling 131 people on board. The flight was packed as it was the start of Easter and transportation services across the Philippines were heavily crowded, with people taking advantage of the long holidays going back to their hometowns in the country. Among the victims were the sister-in-law, nephew, and niece of then-Cotabato Governor Emmanuel Piñol.

== Accident ==
On April 19, 2000, Flight 541, with 131 passengers and crew, left Manila at about 5:30 a.m. At around 7 a.m. the aircraft was approaching runway 05 at Davao City behind an Airbus A320 operated by Philippine Airlines. When Flight 541 broke out of the clouds the crew observed that the preceding aircraft had not cleared the runway, they advised air traffic control that a missed approach procedure would be executed. Flight 541 began to climb and re-entered the clouds. The correct procedure would have been to climb to 4,000 feet (1,200 m) on instruments and circle around to pick up a glide slope. Instead, the pilots attempted to fly VFR in instrument conditions at a lower altitude. Flight 541 hit a coconut tree about 500 feet (150 m) above sea level, and crashed east of Francisco Bangoy International Airport. The plane subsequently caught fire and disintegrated; there were no survivors.

== Aftermath ==
Villagers on the island said the plane was flying at low altitude and hit the top of a coconut tree, which knocked off part of its wing. They said it appeared the plane tried to pull up under full engine power, but failed and crashed. The plane caught fire when it came down in a coconut grove. Airport officials said skies were foggy at the time of the accident. Twenty-one of the victims were never identified and were buried in a mass grave.

Francisco Bangoy International Airport did not have instrument landing equipment at the time, and visual landings had been cancelled several minutes before the crash.
