= PAL Express =

Regional airline of the Philippines (formerly Air Philippines and Airphil Express)

Air Philippines Corporation
IATA	ICAO	Call sign
2P	GAP	AIRPHIL
- Founded: February 13, 1995; 31 years ago (as Air Philippines); April 14, 2008; 18 years ago (as PAL Express)
- Commenced operations: February 1, 1996; 30 years ago (as Air Philippines); May 5, 2008; 18 years ago (as PAL Express, first incarnation); March 28, 2010; 16 years ago (as Airphil Express); March 15, 2013; 13 years ago (as PAL Express, second incarnation)
- AOC #: 2009006
- Hubs: Manila
- Secondary hubs: Cebu; Clark; Davao; Iloilo
- Focus cities: Zamboanga
- Frequent-flyer program: Mabuhay Miles
- Fleet size: 33
- Destinations: 32
- Parent company: Philippine Airlines
- Headquarters: Pasay, Metro Manila, Philippines
- Key people: Lucio C. Tan (Chairman); Carlos Luis L. Fernandez (President)
- Website: www.philippineairlines.com

PAL Express (formerly branded as Air Philippines and Airphil Express and stylized as PAL express) is a wholly owned regional subsidiary of Philippine Airlines. It is PAL's regional brand, with services from its hubs in Manila, Clark, Cebu, and Davao.

The airline was rebranded a number of times - first as Air Philippines, then Airphil Express, and finally as PAL Express. After a series of financial losses, Air Philippines ceased operations until it was acquired by investors from Philippine Airlines. After the acquisition, the airline was re-launched as PAL Express, operating some routes and slot assignments of its sister company Philippine Airlines until its management decided to rebrand the carrier as a budget airline known as Airphil Express.

However, in March 2013, the airline name reverted to PAL Express. As a codeshare partner of Philippine Airlines, PAL Express operates as a full-service carrier within a low-cost business model.

PAL Express is Philippine Airlines' answer to Cebu Pacific's dominance in the low-cost travel market in the Philippines. It has allowed PAL to focus on the premium market, where PAL does not have competition among other airlines. PAL Express gained a significant increase in passengers following its launch as a low-cost carrier. The airline is currently in fleet acquisition mode to support its regional route expansion plan.

== History ==
=== Beginnings as Air Philippines (1995–1999) ===
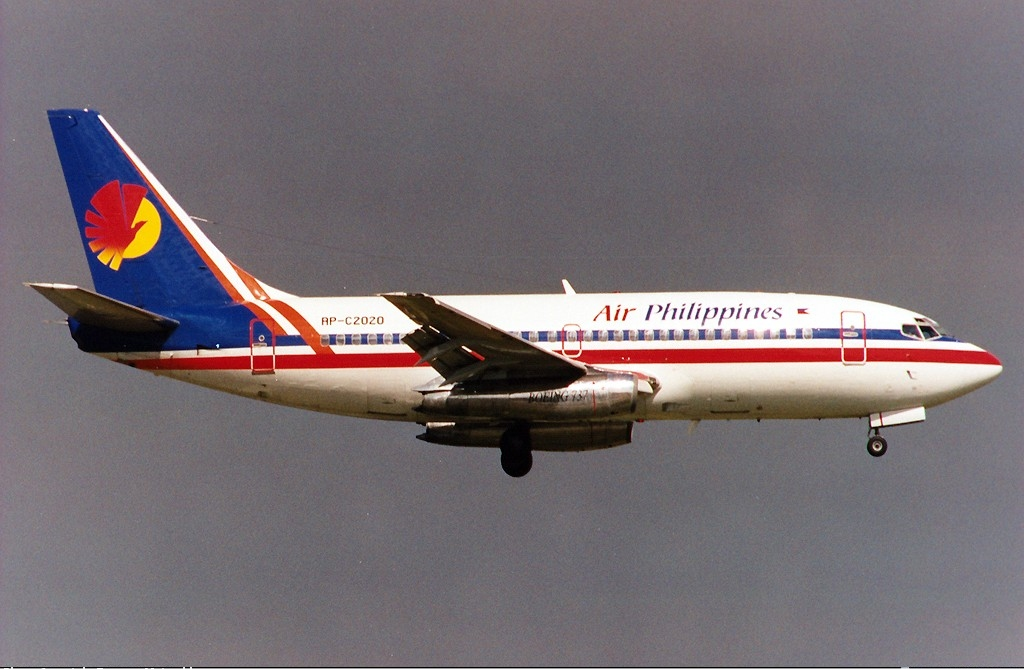
Air Philippines Boeing 737-200

Air Philippines was incorporated on February 13, 1995, with its hub at Subic Bay International Airport. Flight operations started on February 1, 1996, with a Boeing 737-200 between Subic Bay, Iloilo, and Zamboanga. In 1996, six NAMC YS-11 and four Boeing 737-200 aircraft were acquired by the company. In 1997, an additional Boeing 737-200 was acquired. In this same year, the airline carried over 675,000 passengers and over 773,000 in 1998. In September 1998, the airline was temporarily grounded by the Air Transportation Office (ATO), the forerunner to the Civil Aviation Authority of the Philippines (CAAP) in 2004.

=== Lucio Tan Group takeover (1999–2008) ===
It was in 1999 that the Lucio Tan Group took over management of the airline. In March 1999, Air Philippines was granted approval to operate international services to Hong Kong, Japan, South Korea, Taiwan, and the USA. In May 2001, two Boeing 737-300 aircraft were delivered to the airline. In mid 2002, charter flights were started from Subic Bay and Laoag to Hong Kong. Passenger numbers carried rose to nearly 881,000 in 2002. In July 2004, charter flights from Subic Bay to Guangzhou were launched.

Air Philippines significantly increased ties with Philippine Airlines (PAL), including the merging of frequent flier plans, timetables, and ticket sales and subsequently transferred its operations to the larger Terminal 2 of Ninoy Aquino International Airport from the smaller Terminal 4 to join Philippine Airlines. Some of PAL's major stock owners are also owners of Air Philippines. Air Philippines officially ceased to be part of Philippine Airlines' frequent flier program, "Mabuhay Miles", on October 1, 2007. Air Philippines has said that they chose to back out of the Mabuhay Miles program to benefit their passengers, so rather than flying numerous flights to gain miles and wait to a certain point to receive bonuses, passengers can benefit with lower fares and more discounts with quicker bonuses, much more like today's modern-day low-cost airline.

=== PAL Express launch (2008–2010) ===
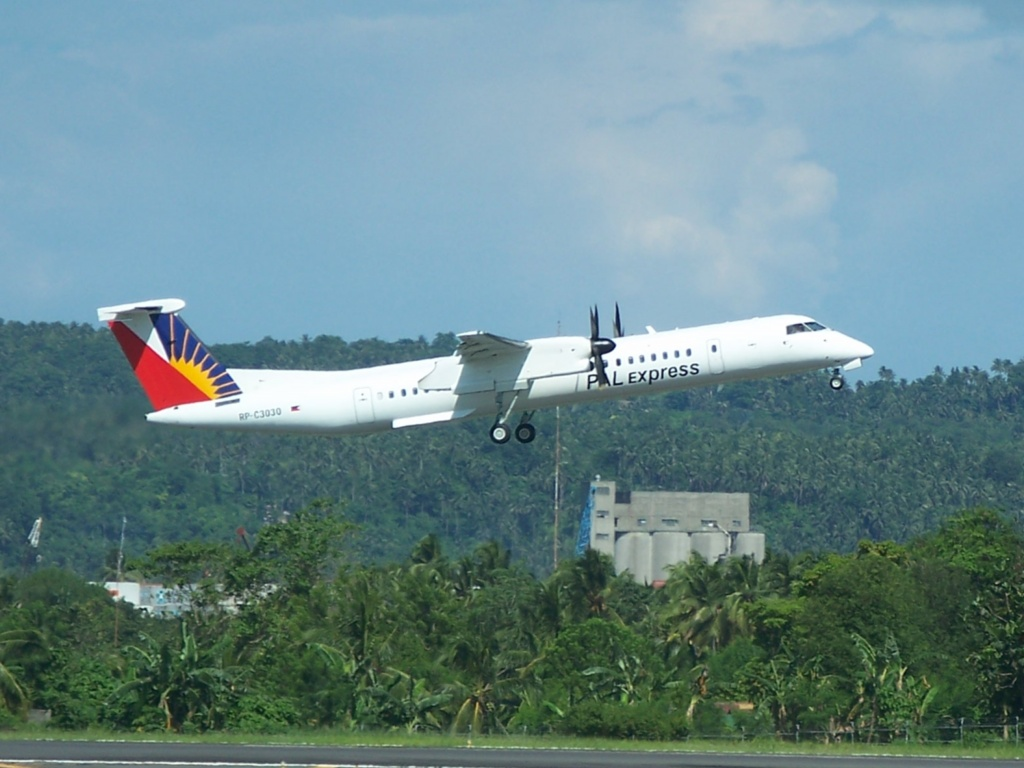
PAL Express Dash 8 Q400 in Davao, 2008

On April 10, 2008, Philippine Airlines announced an order for aircraft for the PAL Express fleet. It consisted of aircraft from the Bombardier Q family, including three from the Q300 series and six from the Q400 series, manufactured by Bombardier Aerospace in a deal valued at $150 million. PAL announced on April 13 that the new fleet would be based mainly in Cebu to serve regional routes, while flights from Manila would also be launched.

PAL Express was unveiled on April 14, 2008. The airline primarily flies intra-regional routes from its Cebu hub to the Visayas and Mindanao islands, as well as secondary routes to smaller airports in island provinces that are not able to accommodate PAL's mainline jet aircraft. On May 5, 2008, PAL Express began operations by launching flights to Caticlan. The airline then announced that it would serve 22 inter-island routes, including some provincial points that lacked air service. Flights out of Cebu commenced on May 19, 2008. After Air Philippines ceased operations in 2009, they transferred all their flights to PAL Express.

PAL Express ceased operations on March 28, 2010, and transferred all of its flights to the then-newly launched Airphil Express.

=== Airphil Express rebranding (2010–2012) ===
Former logo of Airphil Express

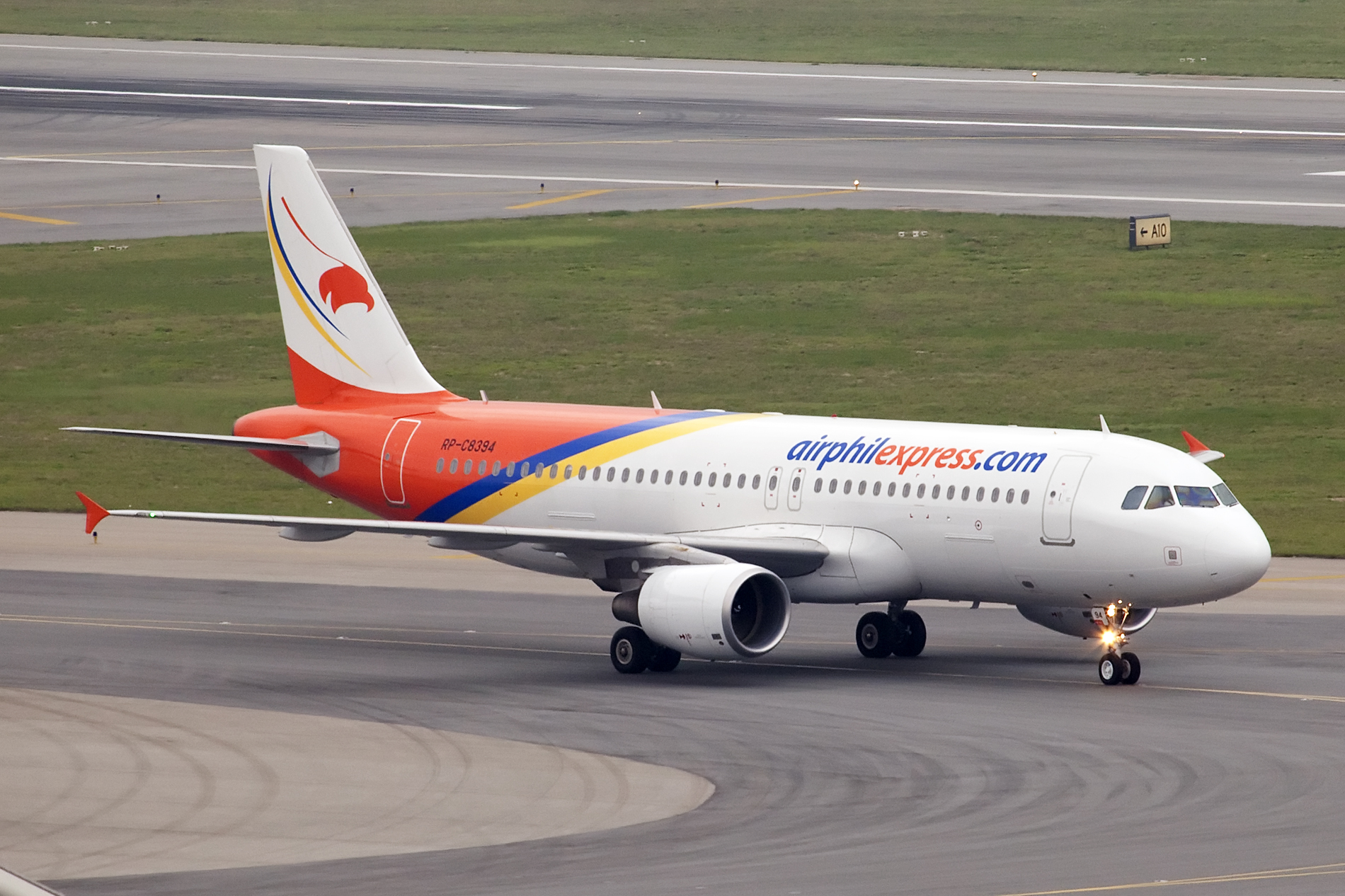
RP-C8394 in Airphil Express livery at Hong Kong International Airport. The plane was repainted to the "sunriser" livery and remained in service with the airline after its rebranding to PAL Express until it was returned to its lessor; it now operates for Thai Vietjet Air as HS-VKD.

Air Philippines was rebranded as Airphil Express on March 28, 2010. The airline restored jet service to Iloilo, Bacolod, Puerto Princesa and Cagayan de Oro, utilizing Airbus A320 family aircraft. The airline subsequently operated eight Bombardier Q300 and Q400 turboprop aircraft and two Airbus A320s, all of which were former Philippine Airlines aircraft.

On the day of the re-launch, the airline announced the acquisition of 20 A320s. In January and early February 2012, GE Capital Aviation Services Limited (GECAS) announced the delivery of three new Airbus A320 aircraft to Airphil Express to help the carrier expand its fleet.

During its time, Airphil Express was regarded as the fastest-growing low-cost airline in the Philippines. In 2011, it had a 19% market share in the Philippine aviation market. Its destinations and route network continued to expand as its fleet expanded.

=== PAL Express revival (2013–present) ===
In August 2012, Philippine Airlines announced the rebranding of Airphil Express as PAL Express. The rebranding took effect on March 15, 2013, while maintaining its business name as Air Philippines Corporation.

PAL Express began carrying the brand name Philippine Airlines through a cooperative agreement with PAL. This strategy is intended to harmonize the two carriers in order to make them more competitive, ensure leadership and superior core services, and enhance the efficiency and profitability of both carriers. As PAL continued to expand its code-sharing agreement with PAL Express, PAL transferred most of its domestic flights to PAL Express by August 1, 2013.

In 2016, the airline signed a letter of intent with Bombardier for orders of up to 12 Bombardier Dash 8-Q400 aircraft in a two-class 86-seat configuration. On December 16, 2016, PAL Express began its Caticlan, Busuanga and Basco services from its Clark hub. These alternate route operations were launched to decongest traffic on their Manila hub.

On February 3, 2026, the airline announced that it would be moving all its turboprop operations from Manila to Clark on March 29, 2026, in accordance with the Manila Slot Coordination Committee's decision to move all turboprop flights from Manila to Clark last 2025.

== Fleet ==
=== Current fleet ===
As of August 2026, PAL Express operates the following aircraft:

PAL Express fleet
Aircraft	In service	Orders	Passengers				Notes	Ref.
Aircraft	In service	Orders	J	Y+	Y	Total	Notes	Ref.
Airbus A320-200	19	1	—	12	168	180	Some aircraft transferred from Philippine Airlines.	
Airbus A321-200	4	—	12	18	169	199	Some aircraft transferred from Philippine Airlines.	
De Havilland Canada Dash 8-400	10	—	—	6	80	86		
Total	33	1						

==== Gallery ====
PAL Express current fleet

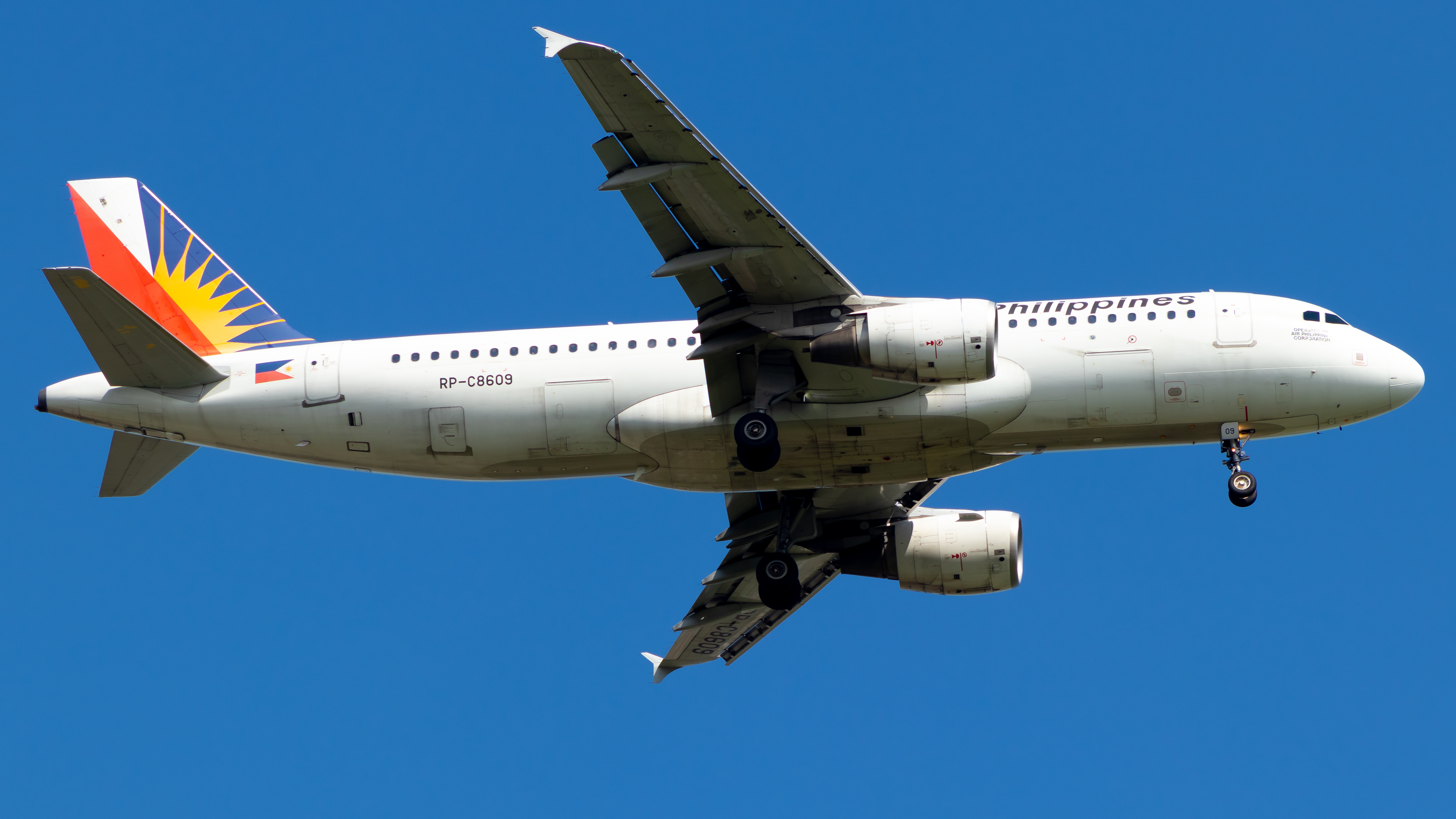
Airbus A320-200

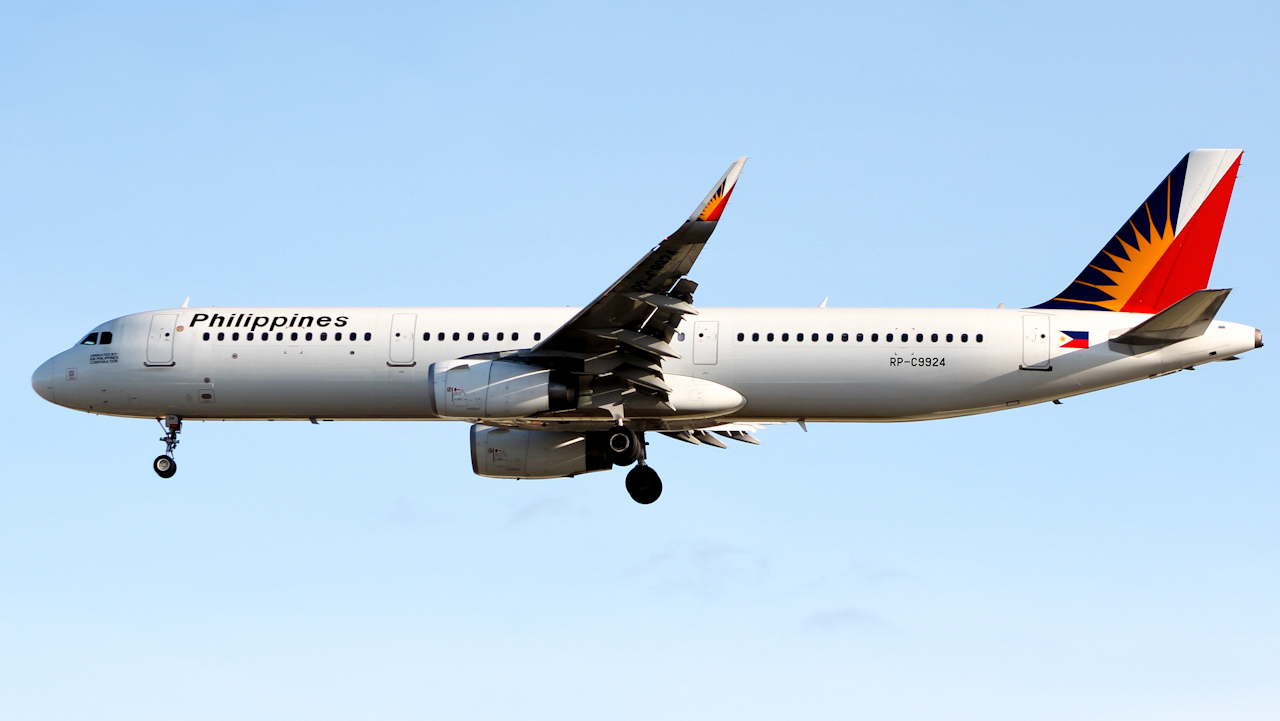
Airbus A321-200

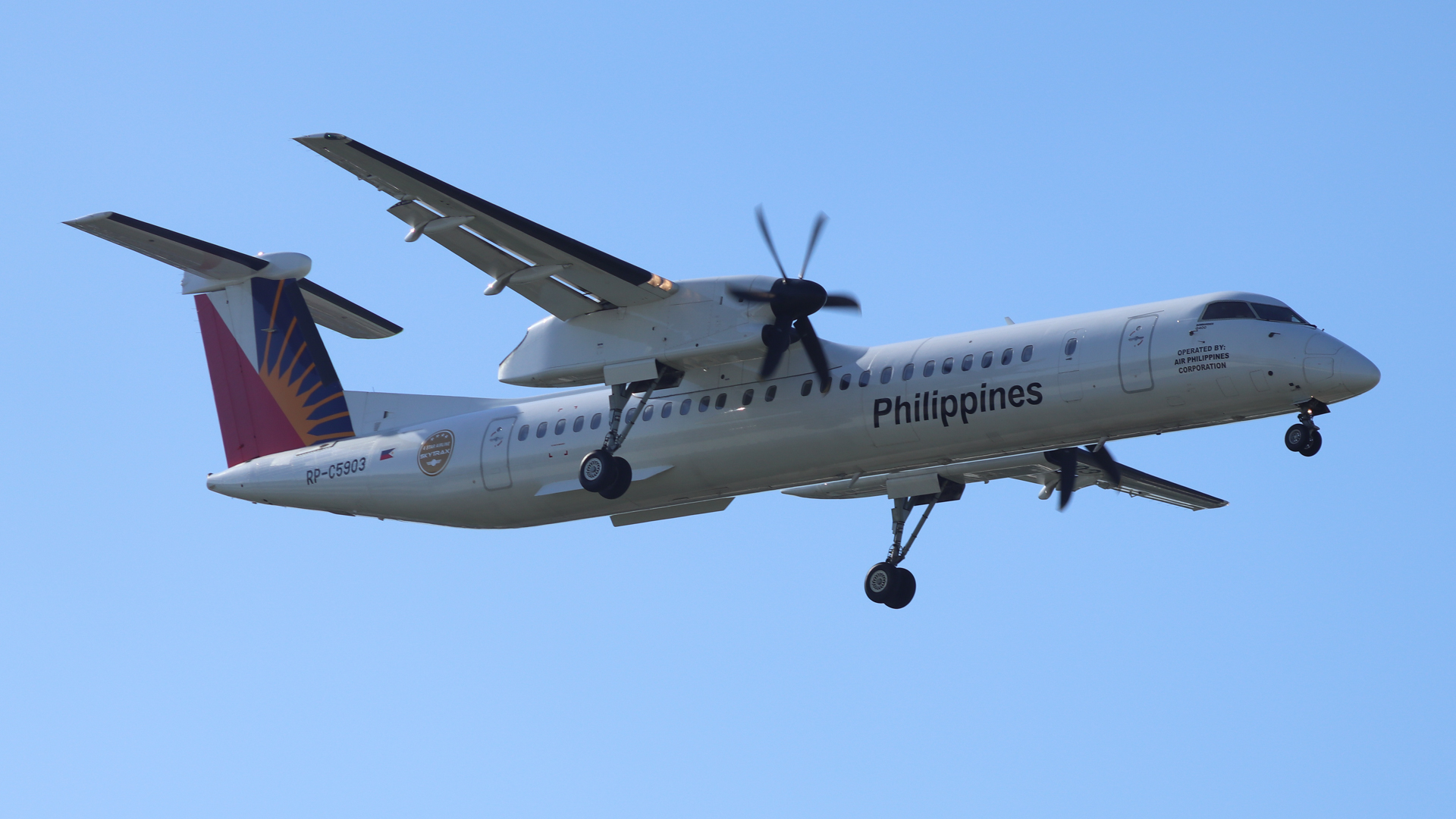
De Havilland Canada Dash 8-400

=== Former fleet ===
PAL Express and its predecessor brands (Air Philippines and Airphil Express) have previously operated the following aircraft:

PAL Express retired fleet
Aircraft	Total	Year introduced	Year retired	Replaced by	Notes
Airbus A330-300	8	2013	2014	None	Transferred from Philippine Airlines. Used on medium- and long-haul routes.
Boeing 737-200	22	1996	2009	Airbus A320-200	
Boeing 737-200	1	1999	2000	None	RP-C3010 crashed in Davao as Flight 541.
Boeing 737-300	3	2001	2004	None	
Boeing 737-400	2	1998	1999	Boeing 737-200	Leased from Malaysia Airlines.
De Havilland Canada Dash 8-300	4	2007	2018	De Havilland Canada Dash 8-400	
McDonnell Douglas MD-82	3	1998	2000	Boeing 737-200	
NAMC YS-11	6	1996	Unknown	None	

== Incidents and accidents ==
- On June 24, 1996, an Air Philippines YS-11 struck a ground power unit while taxiing at Naga Airport (WNP). The aircraft caught fire. There were no fatalities among the 34 aircraft occupants.
- On April 19, 2000, a Boeing 737-200 operating as Air Philippines Flight 541 from Manila to Davao crashed before the approach at Francisco Bangoy International Airport. 124 passengers, and seven crew were killed. It was the deadliest accident of the airline and the worst aviation disaster in Philippine aviation history.
- On August 11, 2008, a Bombardier DHC-8 Q400 operating as Airphil Express Flight 29 with 75 passengers and three crew safely landed on runway 04 at Catarman Airport when the airplane's nose wheel struck a soft spot in the runway's surface while taxiing, the airline reported. No injuries were reported.
- On November 15, 2008, a Bombardier DHC-8 Q400 operating as Airphil Express Flight 272 made an emergency landing at its destination, Francisco Bangoy International Airport, from Zamboanga International Airport due to a problem with the plane's left landing gear. No one on board was injured and the aircraft landed safely.
- On February 13, 2012, an Airbus A320 operating as Airphil Express Flight 969 with 135 people on board overshot the runway at Kalibo International Airport, Kalibo, Aklan. No injuries or aircraft damage occurred in the incident.
- On April 23, 2012, a Bombardier DHC-8 Q400 operating as Airphil Express Flight 285 from Zamboanga City to Tawi-Tawi was aborted as smoke emitted from the right turboprop engine of the plane. The plane was about to take off when pilots noticed the smoke, prompting them to return to the ramp and to order 50 passengers to disembark shortly after 7:00 in the morning. There were no injuries reported.
- On December 10, 2021, a Bombardier DHC-8 Q400 operating as Philippine Airlines Flight PR2369, originating from Caticlan, skidded off the runway at Mactan–Cebu International Airport shortly after landing.
- On December 27, 2024, a Bombardier DHC-8 Q400 operating as PAL Express flight 2P-2285 (RP-C5917) which came from Cebu experienced a “minor runway excursion” on Bacolod–Silay Airport upon landing at approximately 5:30 a.m. on Runway 03 due to heavy rainfall that significantly reduced braking efficiency. All passengers and crew on board were unharmed and were promptly attended to by airport personnel and authorities.
