= Philippine Airlines fleet =

List of aircraft operated by Philippine Airlines

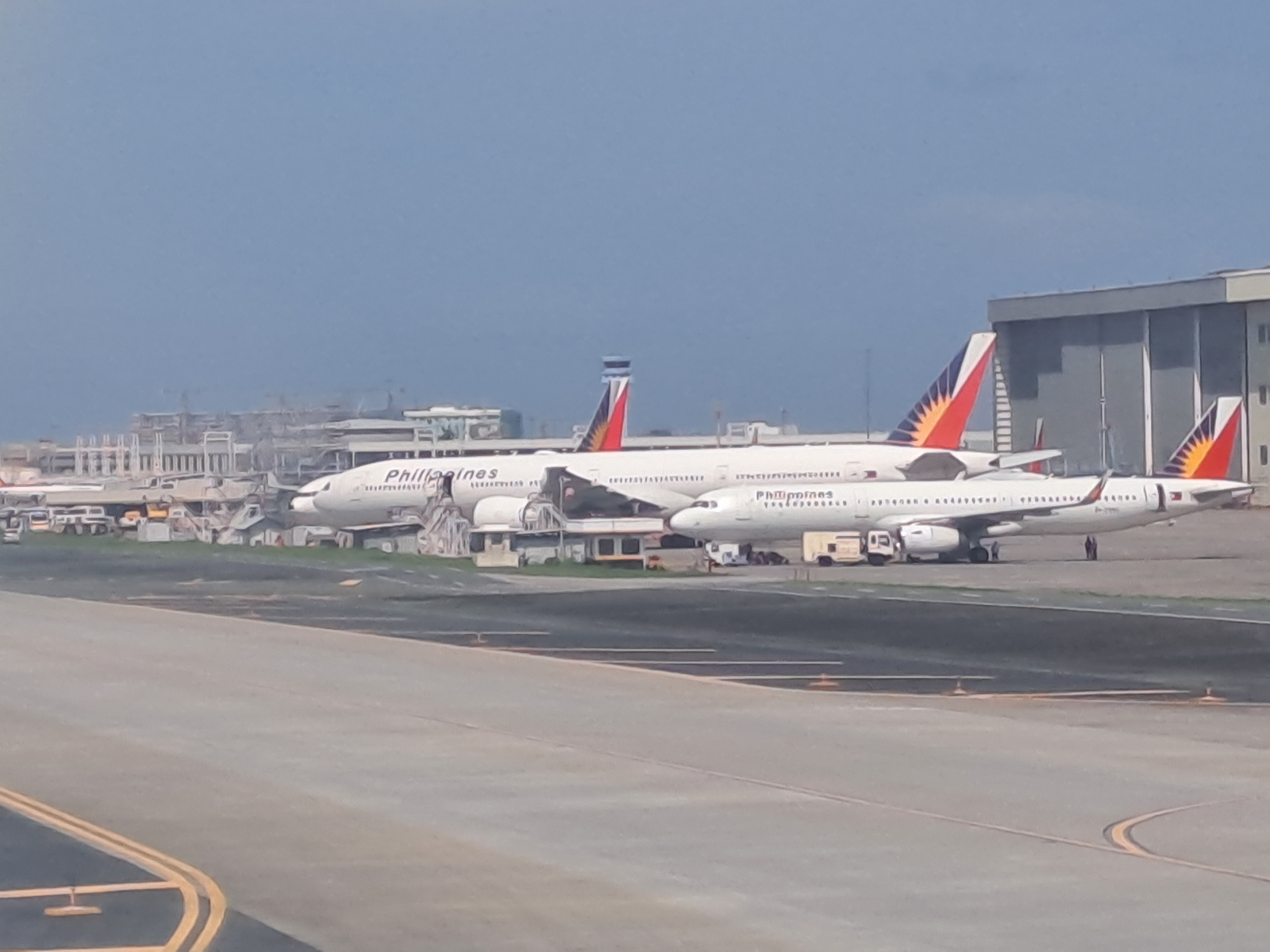
Aircraft of Philippine Airlines parked outside of the maintenance hangars of Lufthansa Technik Philippines

As of November 2026, the mainline Philippine Airlines fleet consists of 53 aircraft and has a further 42 aircraft on order. The fleet consists of Airbus narrow-body and wide-body aircraft, and Boeing wide-body aircraft.

== Current fleet ==
As of November 2026, Philippine Airlines operates the following aircraft:

Philippine Airlines fleet
Aircraft	In service	Orders	Passengers				Notes	Ref.
Aircraft	In service	Orders	J	W	Y	Total	Notes	Ref.
Airbus A321-200	18	—	12	—	182	194	New configuration.	
Airbus A321-200	18	—	12	—	187	199	Outgoing configuration.	
Airbus A321neo	8	13	12	—	156	168		
Airbus A321neo	8	13	12	—	183	195	2 aircraft in Airbus Cabin Flex (ACF) configuration. Deliveries to resume in 2026.	
Airbus A330-300	11	—	18	24	267	309	To be refurbished from 2027.	
Airbus A330-300	11	—	18	—	341	359	To be refurbished from 2027.	
Airbus A330-300	11	—	18	—	345	363	To be refurbished from 2027.	
Airbus A350-900	2	—	30	24	241	295		
Airbus A350-1000	4	14	42	24	316	382	Additional order of 9 with 5 purchase rights to be delivered from 2034.	
Boeing 777-300ER	10	—	42	—	328	370	To be refurbished from 2027.	
Boeing 777-300ER	10	—	26	—	367	393	Former Garuda Indonesia aircraft retaining their original configuration.	
Boeing 787-10	—	15	TBA				Order with 5 purchase rights to be delivered from 2031.	
Total	53	42						

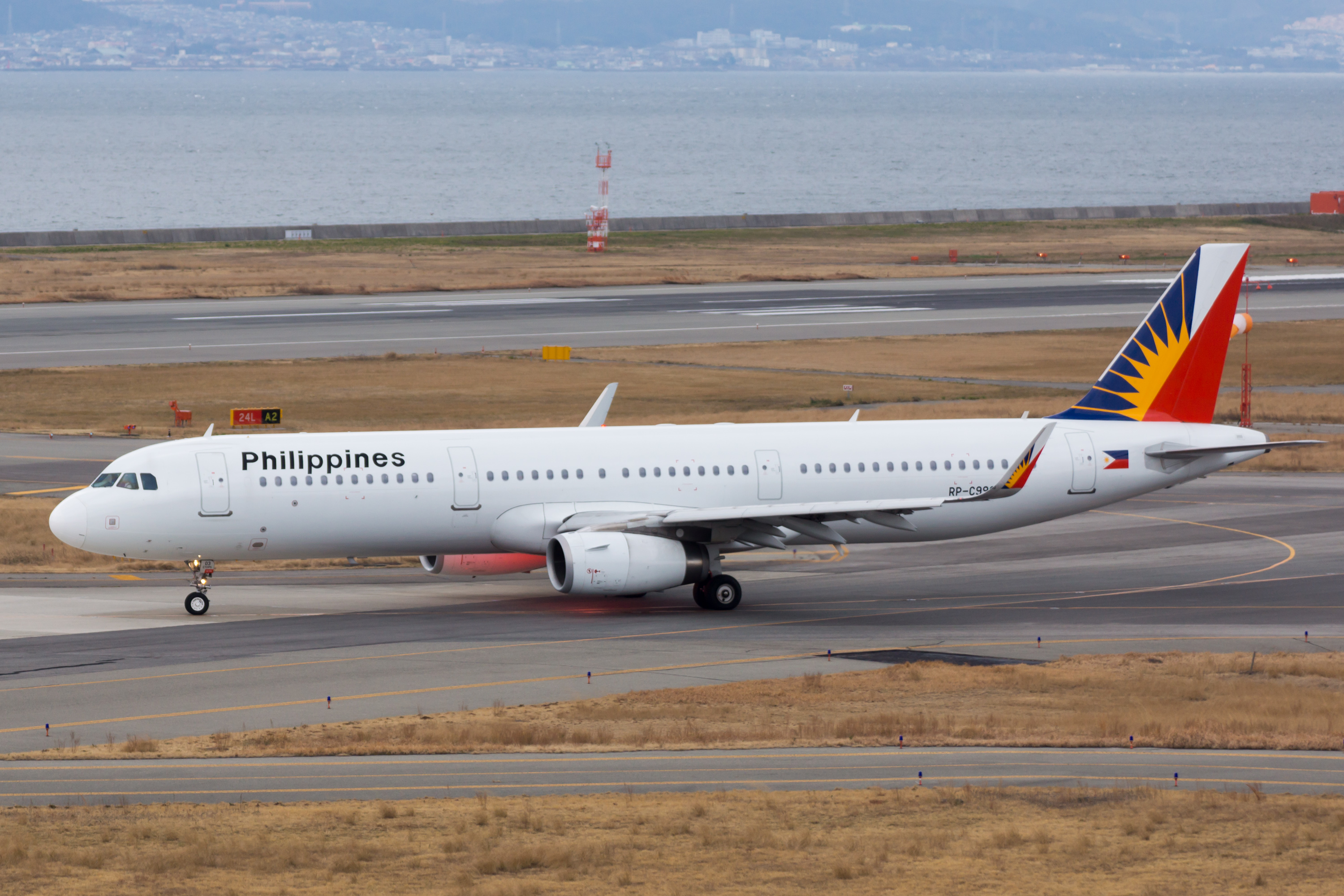
Airbus A321-200

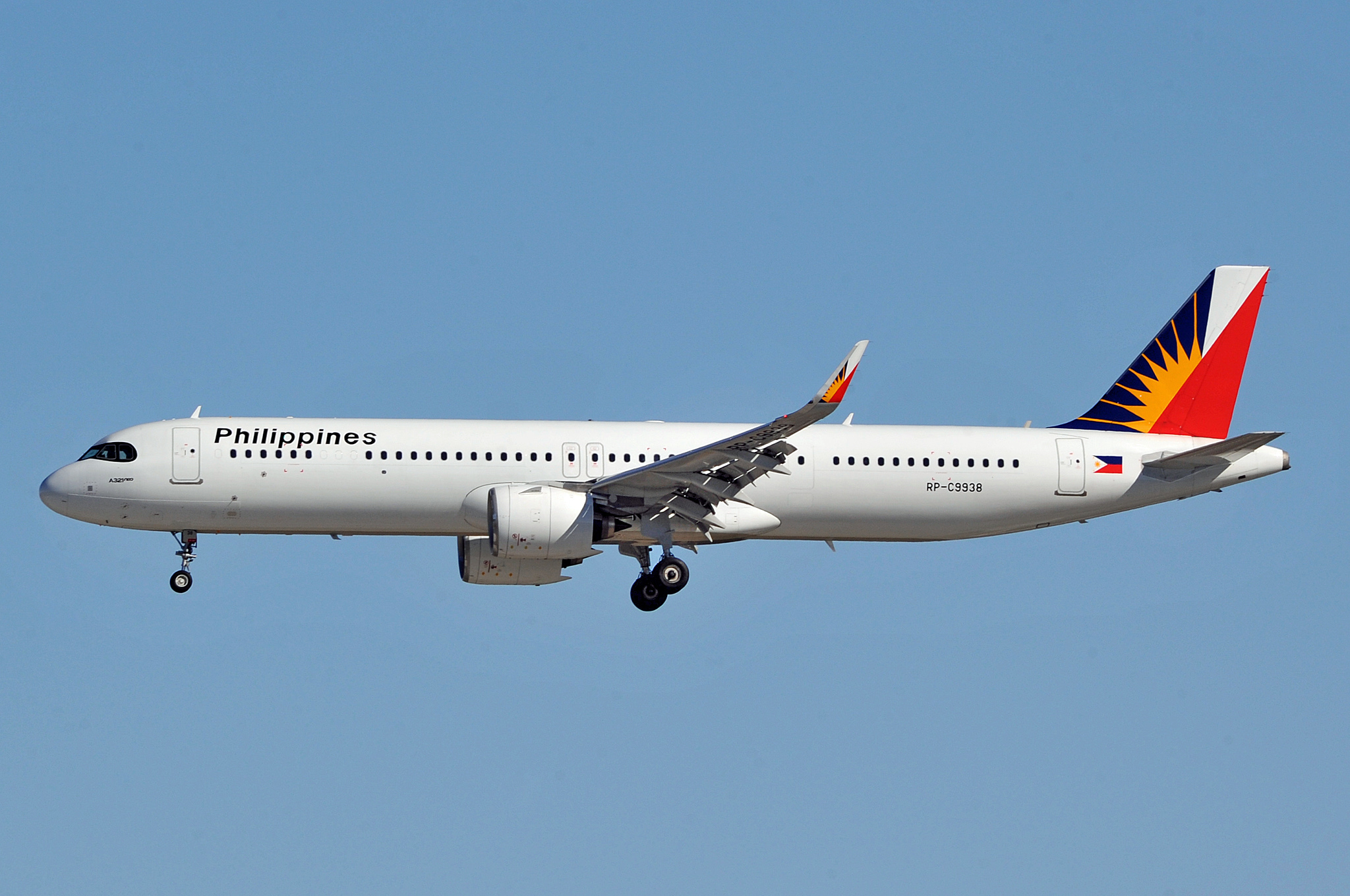
Airbus A321neo

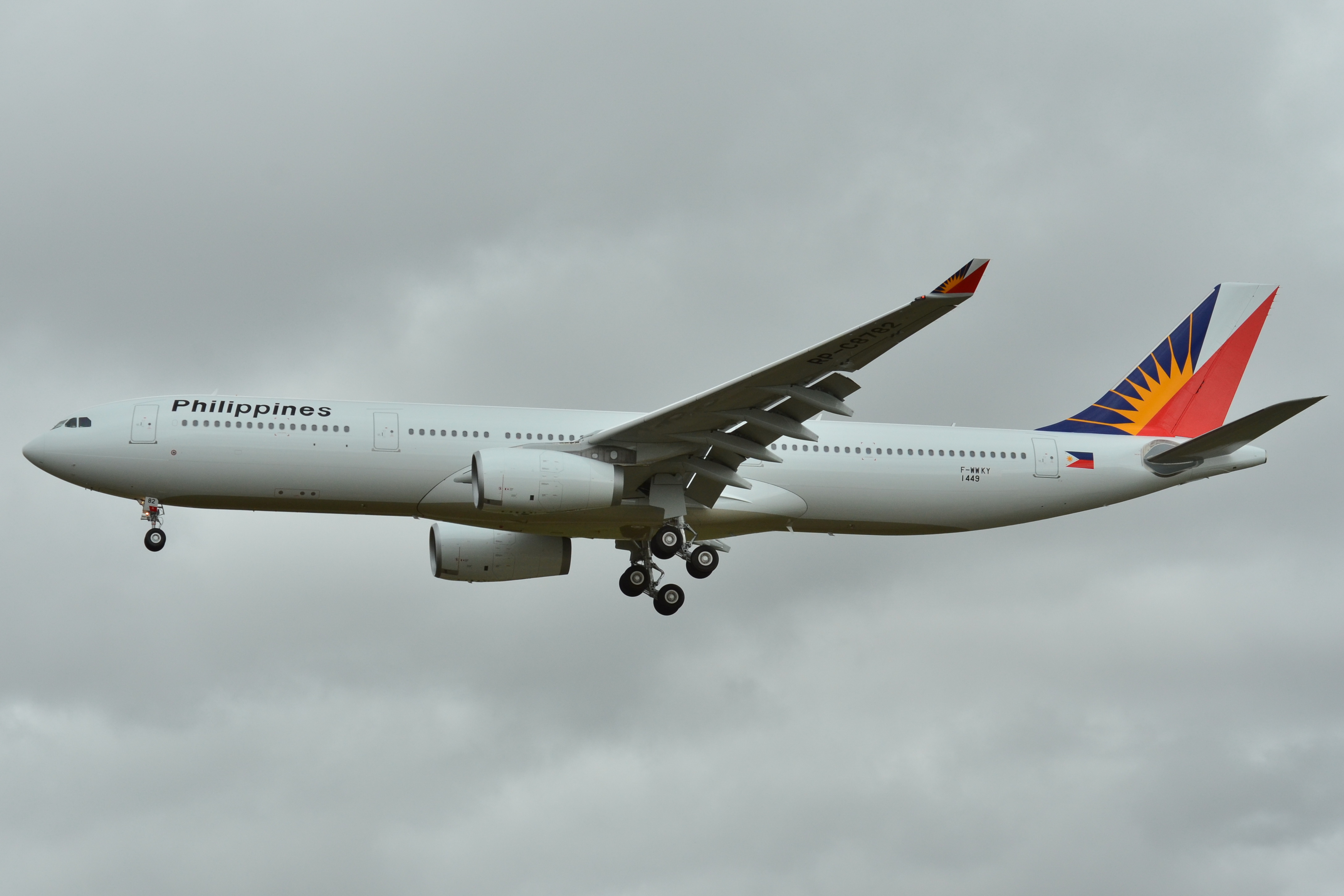
Airbus A330-300

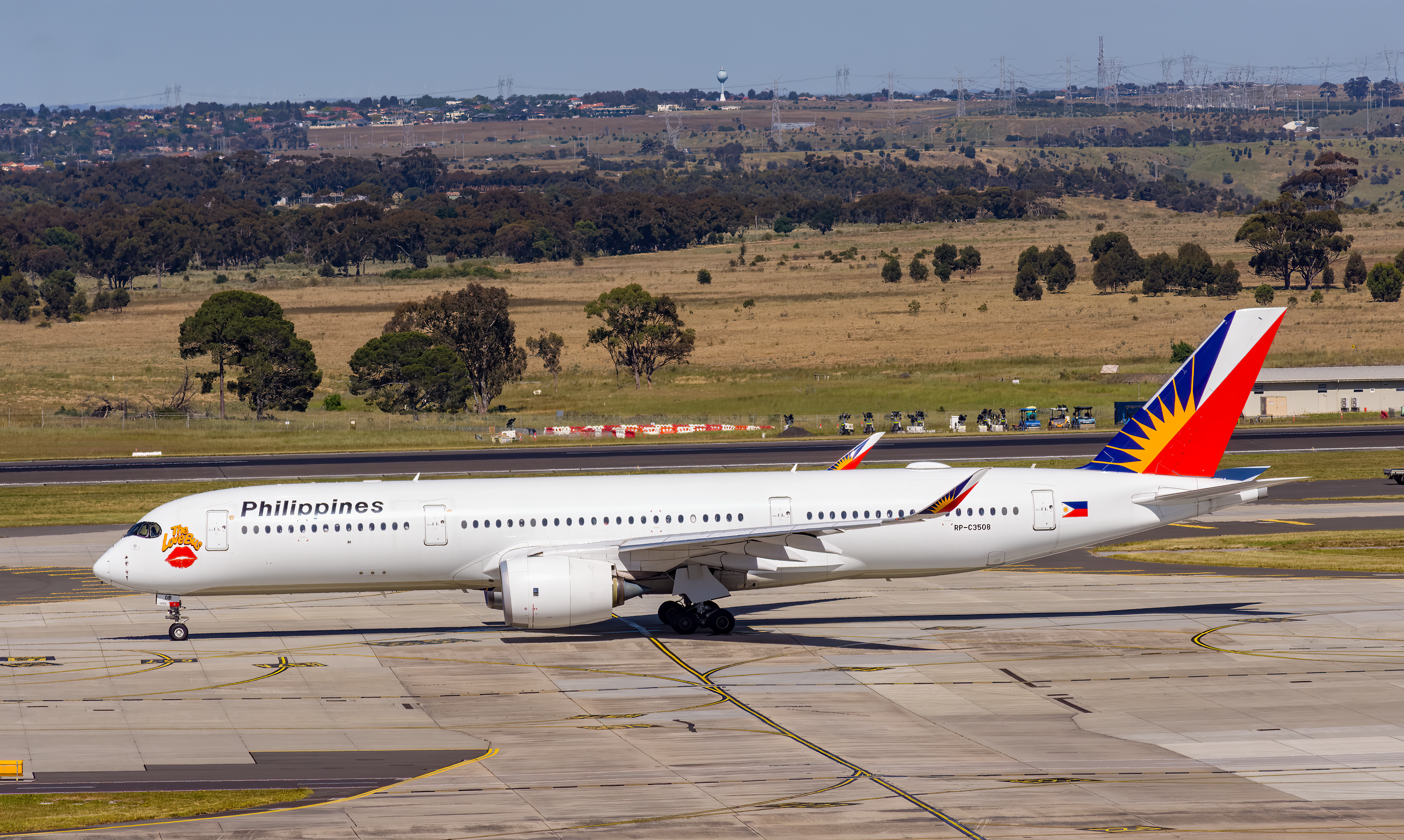
Airbus A350-900

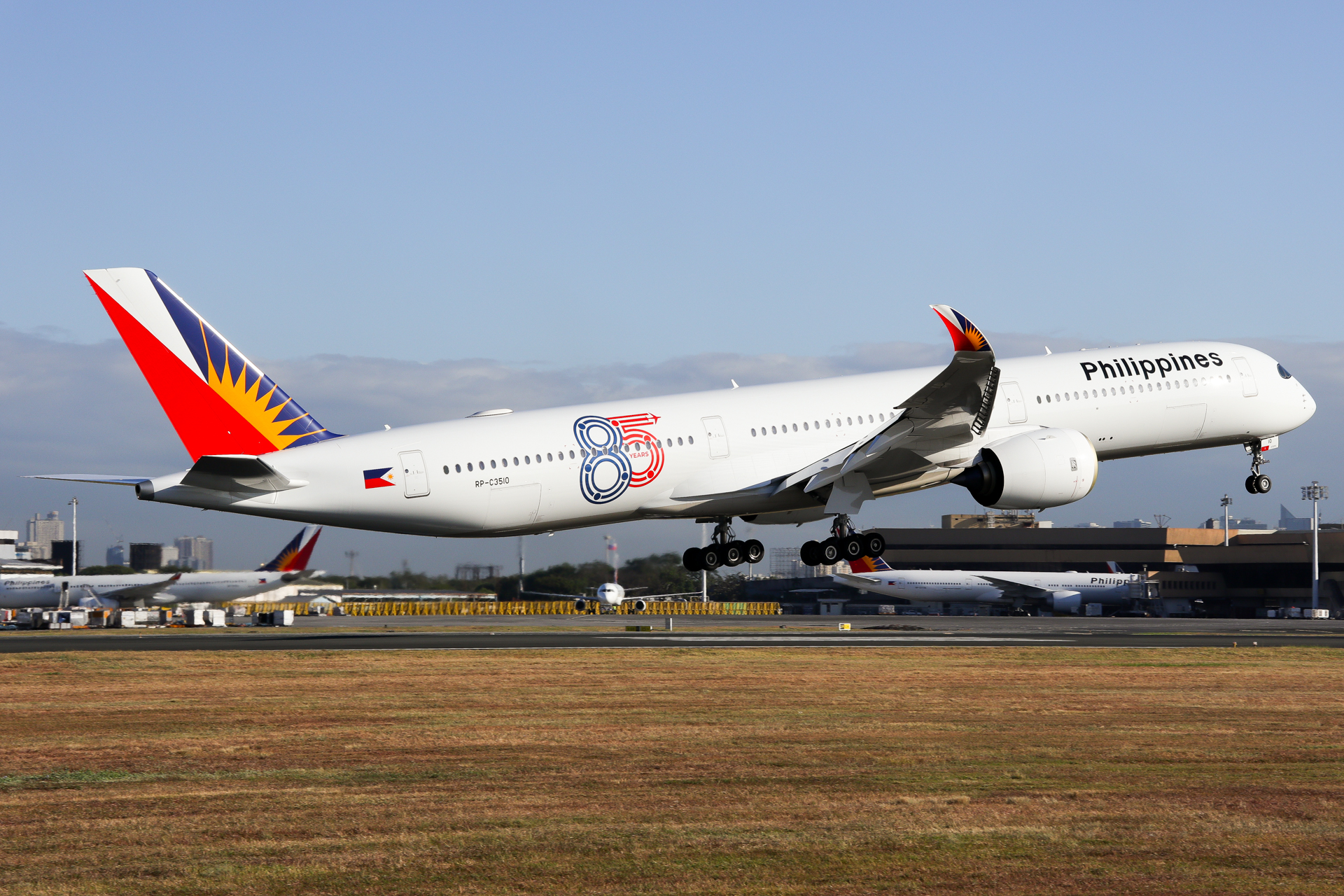
Airbus A350-1000

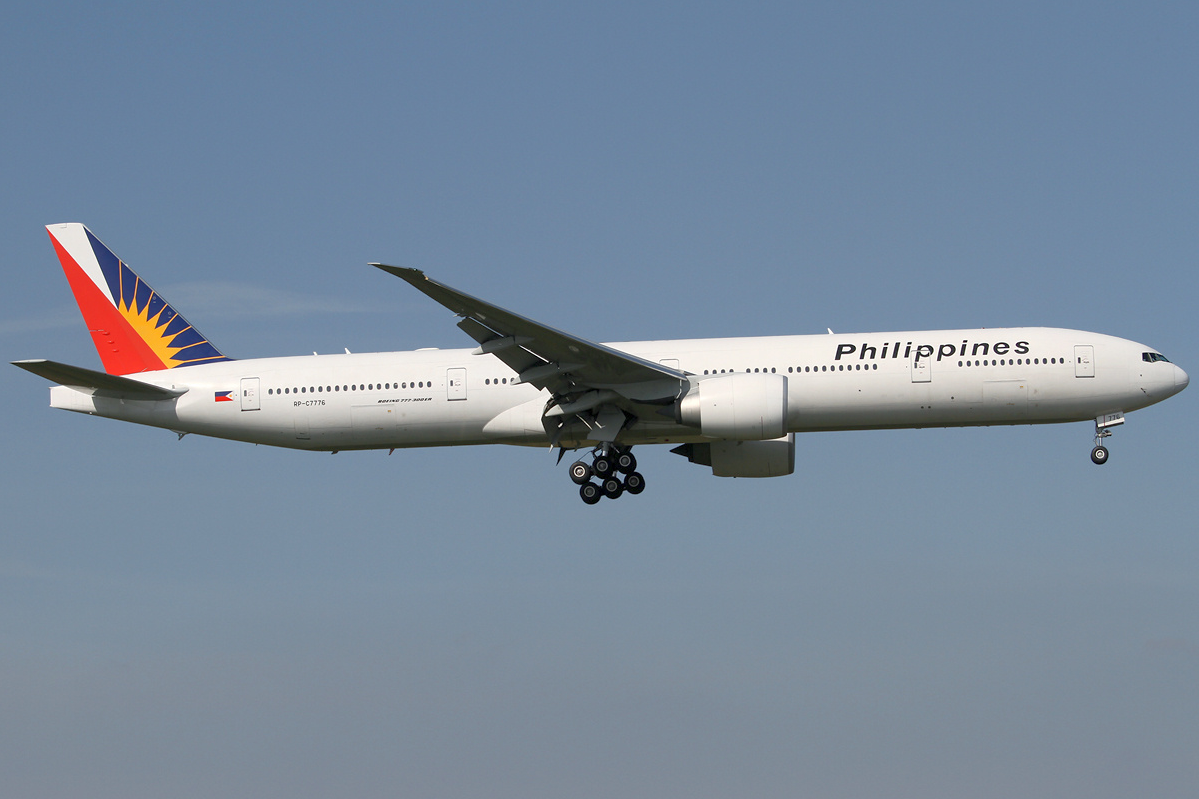
Boeing 777-300ER

== Fleet development ==
=== Airbus A321 ===
On August 28, 2012, Philippine Airlines (PAL) ordered 44 Airbus A321s, splitting it between 34 A321ceo and ten A321neo aircraft. Orders for the A321ceo were later reduced to 24. These are utilized for short-haul and medium-haul flights that serve Southeast and East Asia such as Hong Kong, Singapore, Bangkok, and Kuala Lumpur, as well as major domestic destinations including Cebu and Davao. The first A321, equipped with IAE V2500 engines, was delivered on August 7, 2013.

The A321neos were originally scheduled for delivery starting November 2017; however, PAL postponed it to January 2018, and again to May, due to problems with the Pratt & Whitney PW1100G engines. PAL received its first A321neo on June 1, 2018, while the other five A321neos were delivered until December 2018. The remaining fifteen A321neos in the SR variant, on the other hand, will be delivered in the following years. However, PAL only received two A321neo SRs in 2019 as the airline revises its re-fleeting plan.

In August 2021, PAL postponed future deliveries of its A321neo planes to 2026 due to the COVID-19 pandemic and its subsequent filing for Chapter 11 bankruptcy. Subsequently, it decided to refurbish its older A321ceo aircraft with new seats and in-flight entertainment from mid-2025 onwards; the first refurbished A321ceo re-entered service on September 24, 2025.

The first six long-range Airbus A321neos, capable of eight-hour flights, primarily serve the airline's select medium and long-haul routes such as Brisbane, Perth, Port Moresby, and Sapporo. The SR variants, meanwhile, serve short-haul regional routes in Southeast Asia and other neighboring countries.

In November 2025, a portion of the A321 fleet was temporarily grounded to conduct a mandatory software update for the Elevator and Aileron Computer (ELAC). This was performed due to an Emergency Airworthiness Directive by EASA, following an analysis suggesting strong solar radiation could corrupt critical flight control data. The update resulted in the cancellation of four domestic flights on November 29 and 30, 2025, but was fully completed by the airline by December 1, 2025.

=== Airbus A330 ===
PAL introduced their first Airbus A330-300 on July 30, 1997, with the delivery of the first aircraft, F-OHZM. It later acquired eight Airbus A330-300s as a replacement for their aging Airbus A300B4 fleet. These are primarily deployed in Asia and Oceania routes, as well as flights to Honolulu and Guam, and domestic destinations such as General Santos, Cebu and Davao.

On August 28, 2012, PAL ordered 10 new Airbus Airbus A330-300s, but the airline later expanded its orders to 20 on October 1. The airline received its first A330-300 High Gross Variant (HGW) in September 2013. The newer A330s use a pair of Rolls-Royce Trent 700 engines, unlike the older General Electric CF6 engines that powered the earlier A330 fleet. The original fleet of eight A330s were transferred to PAL Express until they were retired on August 31, 2014.

On May 17, 2024, PAL signed an agreement with Wamos Air to wet lease two Airbus A330-200s for use on flights to Sydney and Melbourne. These aircraft started operating on June 1, and the agreement was to take effect until October 31.

=== Airbus A350 ===
On April 29, 2016, PAL finalized its firm order of six Airbus A350-900s. The contract firms up a memorandum of understanding announced during the 2016 Singapore Airshow on February 17. It replaced the aging Airbus A340-300s that served North American and Asian destinations.

On July 14, 2018, PAL received its first A350-900. On February 14, 2019, PAL took delivery of their fifth A350 with the iconic Love Bus decal to mark the 40th anniversary of their partnership with Airbus.

The A350-900s, which have a three-class configuration (business, premium economy, and economy), are primarily deployed in the airline's ultra long-haul flights to cities such as New York and Toronto. The A350s are also used in domestic and regional Asian flights during peak seasons or when there is high demand in destinations such as Bangkok, Cebu, Davao, Ho Chi Minh City, Hong Kong, Seoul, Singapore, and Tokyo. PAL's A350s have a maximum takeoff weight (MTOW) of 278 tonnes, enabling non-stop Manila–New York flights without payload limitations in either direction, a 7,404-nautical-mile (13,712 km; 8,520 mi) flight which began on October 29, 2018.

On February 15, 2018, Jaime Bautista, then-president of the airline, expressed interested in the larger A350-1000. Five years later, on June 20, 2023, PAL ordered nine A350-1000s with an additional three purchase rights. Deliveries will start from the fourth quarter of 2025 until 2027.

On December 20, 2025, PAL received its first A350-1000, bearing the Philippine registration RP-C3510.

On November 5, 2026, PAL ordered an additional nine A350-1000s, with purchase rights for five more, for delivery between 2034 and 2036. The contract firms up a memorandum of understanding announced during the 2026 Farnborough Airshow on July 21.

=== Boeing 777 ===
On March 12, 2007, PAL finalized the purchase agreement with Boeing covering the firm order of two Boeing 777-300ERs. It ordered two more three months later. These are primarily used for long-haul flights to Los Angeles, San Francisco, Vancouver, Toronto, and Seattle. It was also used for service to London and New York City, but was later replaced by the A350-900. They are sometimes deployed in Asian and Australian routes as well if the demand needs it.

In 2009, the airline leased two Boeing 777-300ER to replace the former flagship Boeing 747-400 from GECAS. The first Boeing 777 was delivered to PAL on November 19, 2009. The airline currently has ten 777s in its fleet.

In June 2019, PAL planned to acquire the next-generation Boeing 777X to gradually replace their aging Boeing 777 fleet.

=== Boeing 787 ===
On November 15, 2026, PAL ordered 15 Boeing 787-10s, with purchase rights for five more, for delivery between 2031 and 2034. The contract firms up a memorandum of understanding announced during the 2026 Farnborough Airshow on July 20. The aircraft are expected to serve regional and long-haul routes currently handled by the A330 and Boeing 777 aircraft.

== Historical fleet ==
Historical fleet of Philippine Airlines

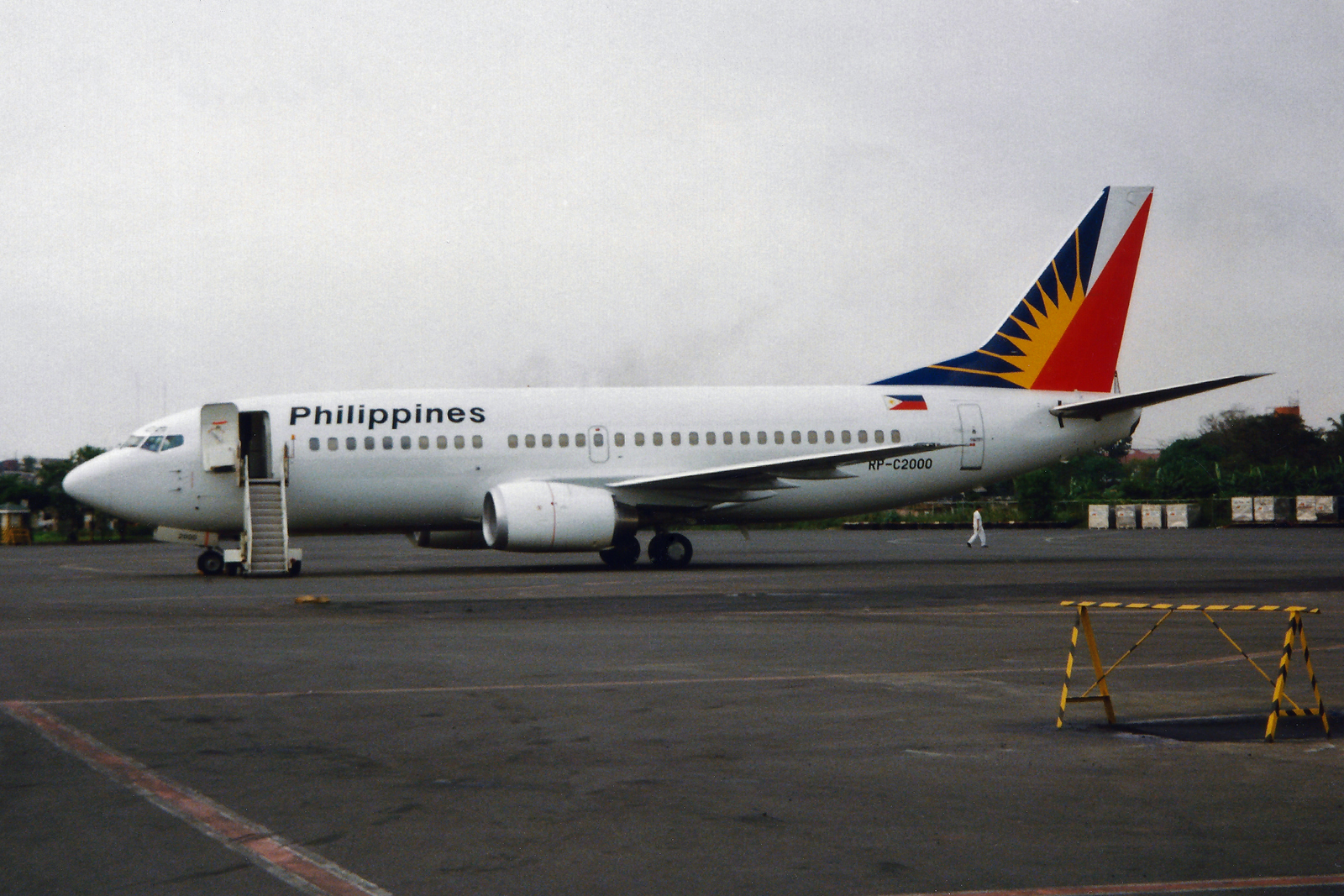
Boeing 737-300

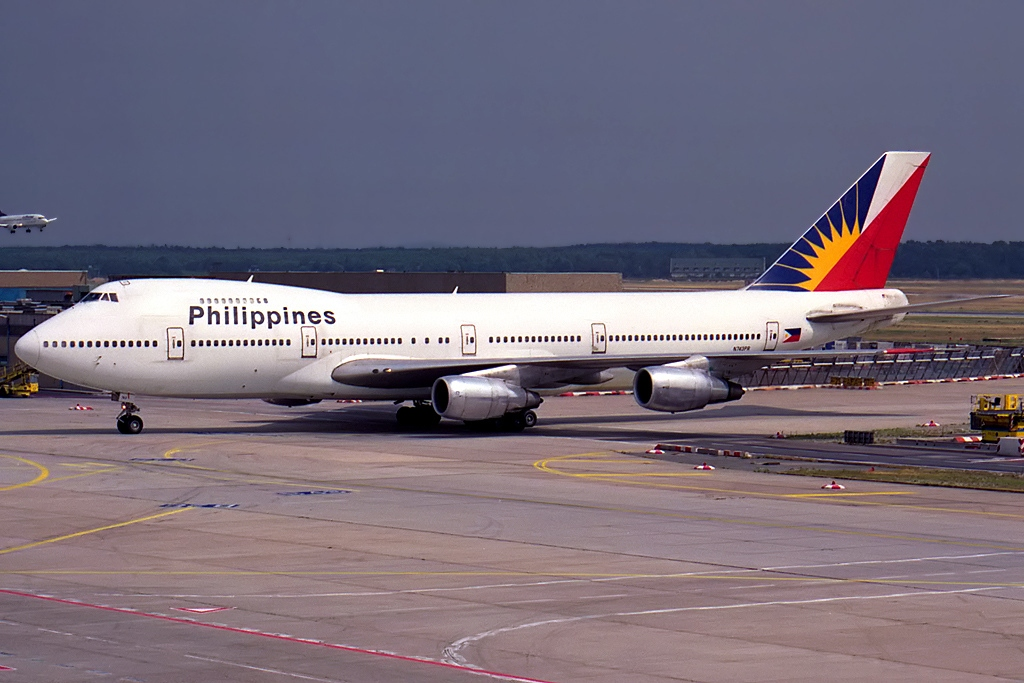
Boeing 747-200B

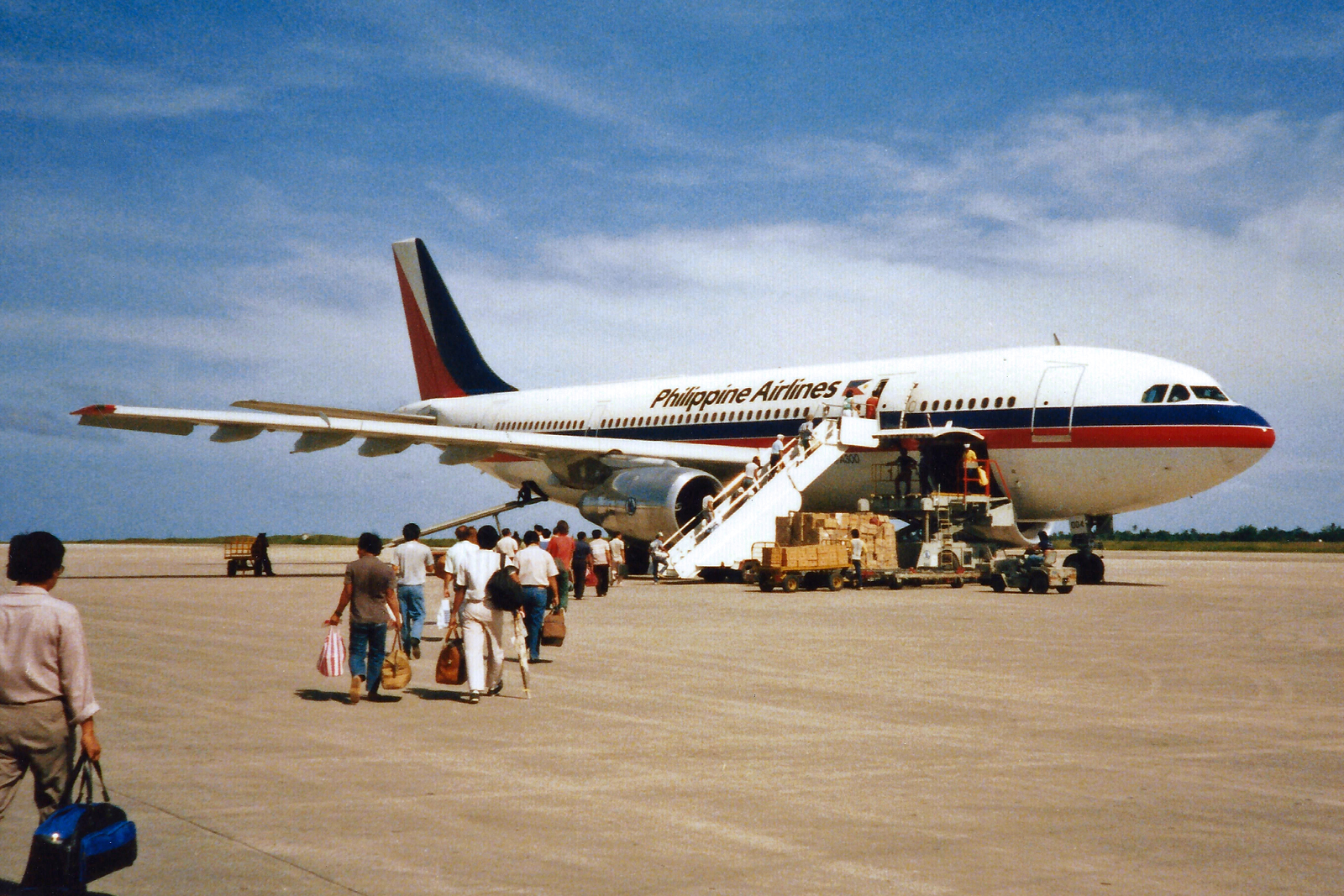
Airbus A300B4

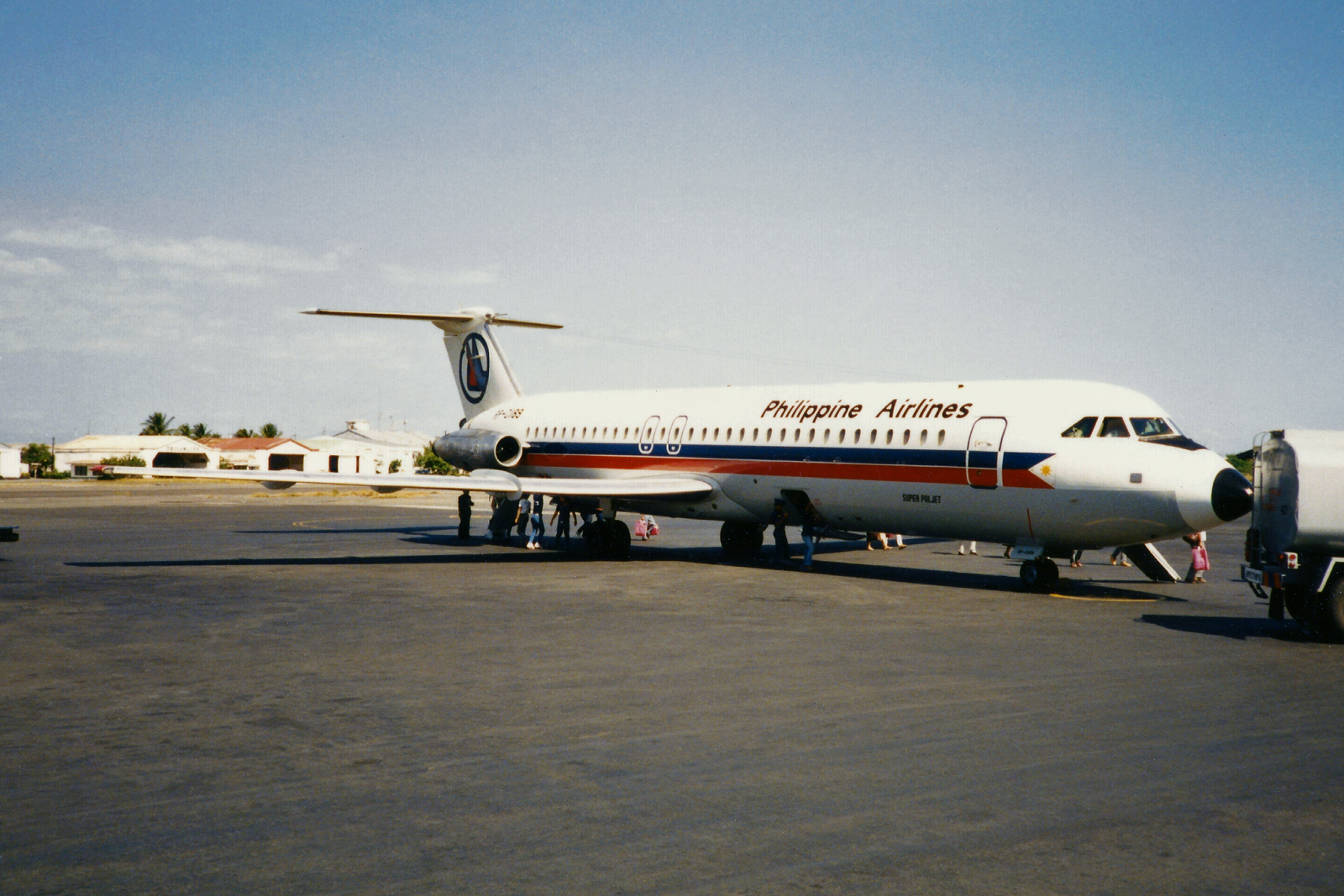
BAC One-Eleven 500

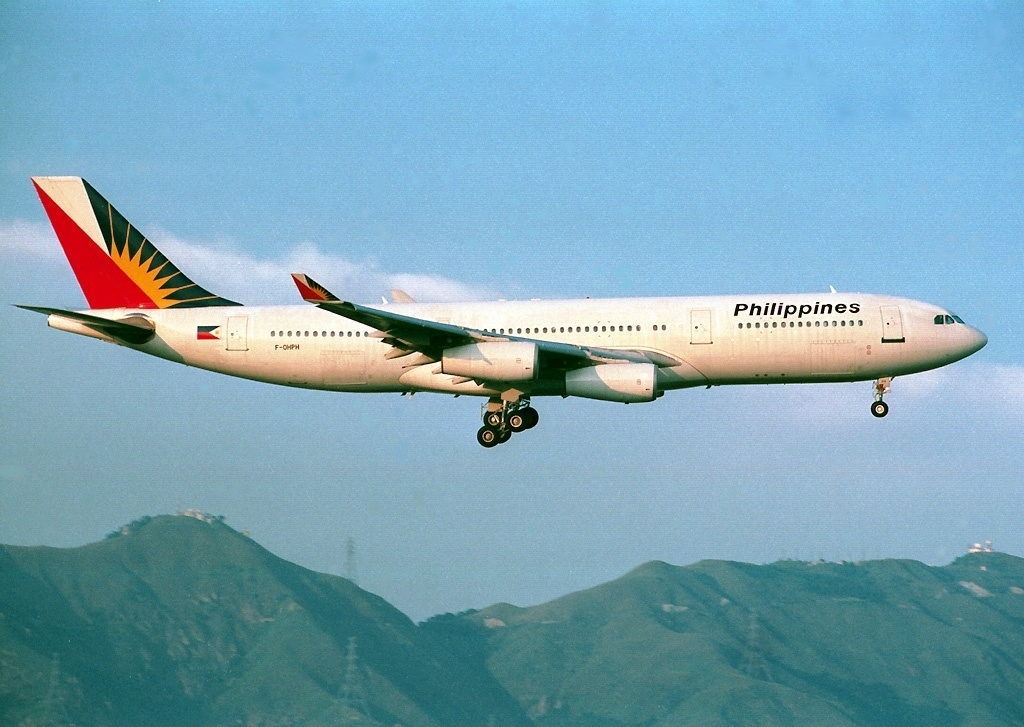
Airbus A340-200

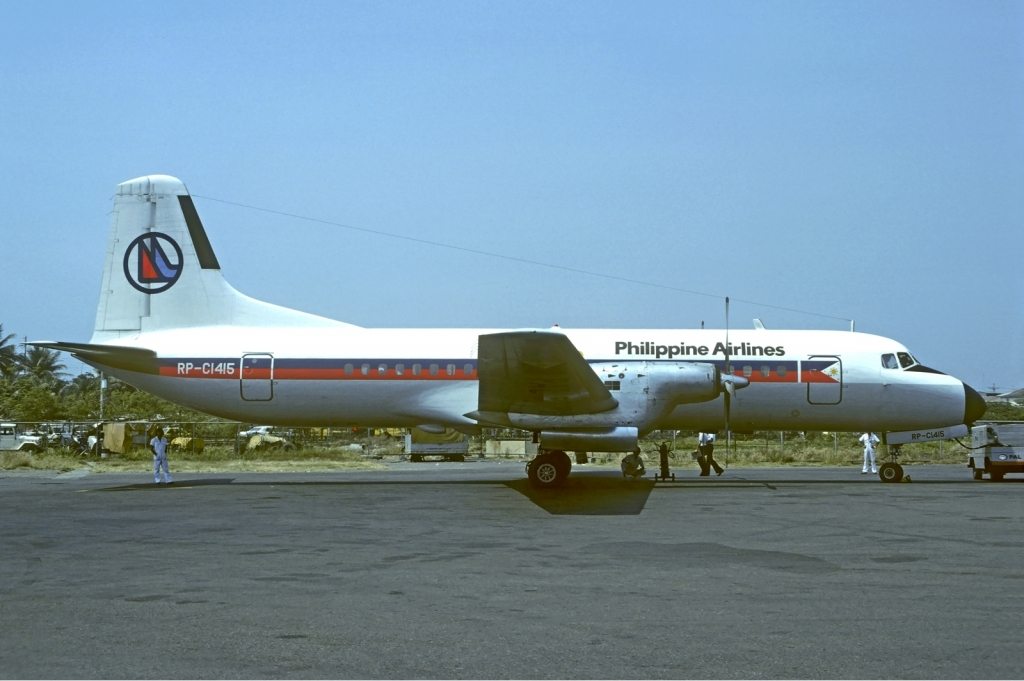
NAMC YS-11

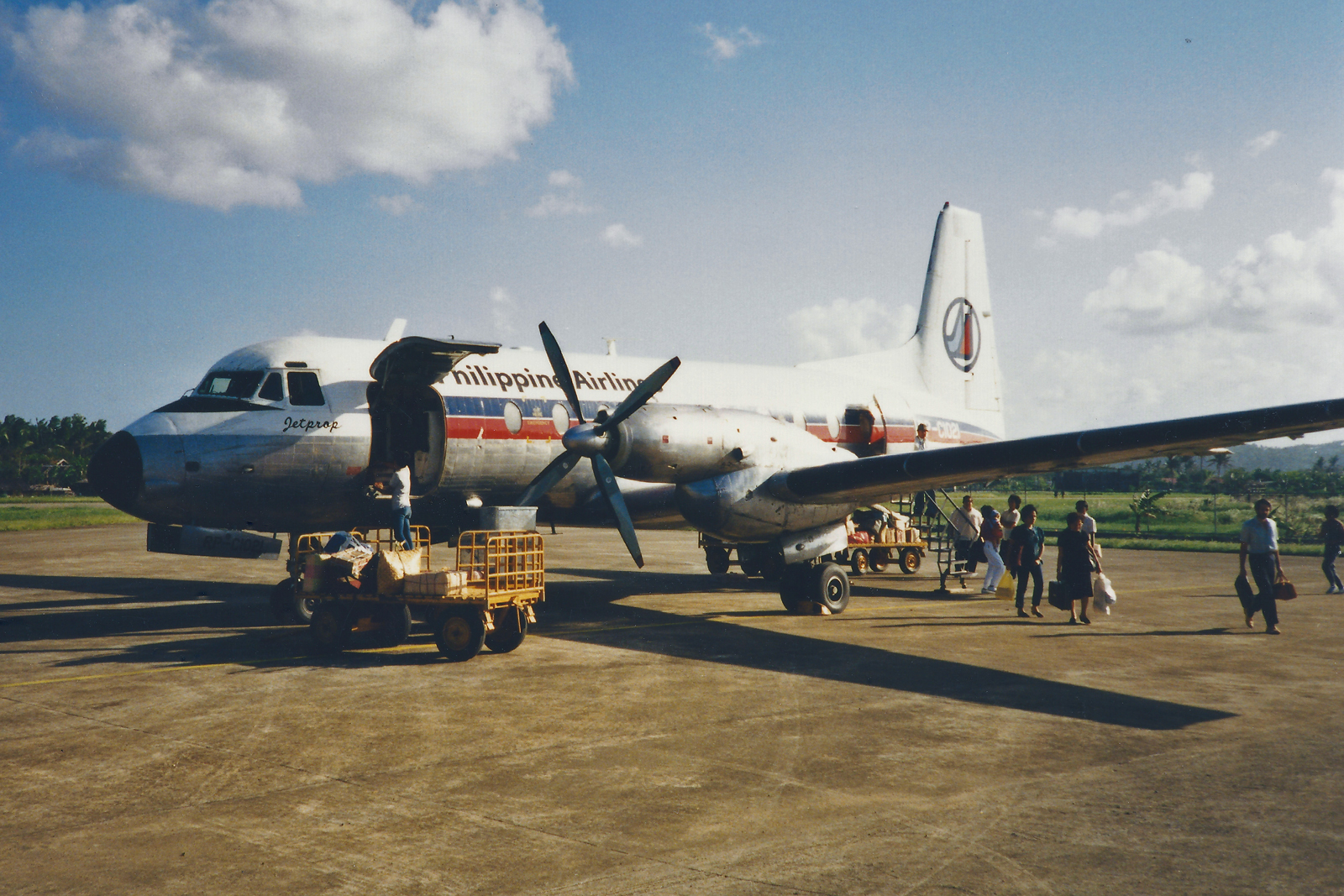
Hawker Siddeley HS 748

Aircraft	Total	Year introduced	Year retired	Replacement	Notes	Refs
Airbus A340-200	4	1996	1999	Airbus A340-300	Leased from AFS.	
Airbus A340-300	3	1996	1997	None	Leased from Gulf Air.	
Airbus A340-300	4	1997	2014	Boeing 777-300ER		
Airbus A340-300	6	2013	2018	Airbus A350-900	Leased from AFS. Ex-Iberia aircraft. Last A340-300 operator in Asia.	
Armstrong Whitworth Argosy C.MK 1	1	1976	1981	None		
BAC One-Eleven 400	4	1966	1971	BAC One-Eleven 500	PI-C1131 crashed as Philippine Air Lines Flight 158 on September 12, 1969.	
BAC One-Eleven 500	13	1971	1992	Boeing 737-300	RP-C1161 was destroyed in a hijacking incident as Philippine Airlines Flight 116. RP-C1193 was written off on July 21, 1989, after crash landing as Philippine Airlines Flight 124.	
Boeing 747-200B	9	1979	2001	Boeing 747-400	First four aircraft (N741PR through N744PR) were configured with 14 "Skybed" berths on upper deck until the 1990s.	
Boeing 747-200M	4	1988	1997	Boeing 747-400	EI-BWF was damaged by an explosive as part of a test run for Bojinka plot.	
Boeing 747-400	4	1993	2014	Boeing 777-300ER	RP-C7471 carried then Philippine president Fidel V. Ramos on its delivery flight.	
Boeing 747-400M	1	1996	2014	Boeing 777-300ER	Originally the second 747-400M of Kuwait Airways (registration 9K-ADF), which was cancelled by the intended airline in favor of Boeing 777s.	
Convair CV-340	Unknown	1953		Unknown		
de Havilland Canada DHC-3 Otter	Unknown	1955				
Douglas DC-3	14	1946	1979	Unknown		
Douglas DC-4	41	1946	Unknown			
Douglas DC-6	5	1948	1954		PI-C294 w/o 14 January 1954, approaching Rome Ciampino Airport	
Douglas DC-6B	2	1952	Unknown	Douglas DC-8		
Douglas DC-8	14	1962	1986			
Hawker Siddley 748	22	1967	1989	Fokker 50		
McDonnell Douglas DC-10-30	6	1974	1996	McDonnell Douglas MD-11	PH-DTC, PH-DTI, and PH-DTK were leased from KLM at various times	
NAMC YS-11	12	1972	1985	Fokker 50		
Vickers Viscount		1957				

== Fleet maintenance ==
The entire PAL fleet of Airbus and Boeing jets were formerly maintained in-house at the PAL Technical Center, which consisted of two hangars. The hangars contained an engine overhaul shop, two engine test cells, and test shops. The responsibility of maintaining the fleet, as well as all the facilities, was subsequently transferred in 2000 to Lufthansa Technik Philippines (LTP), a joint venture of Hamburg-based Lufthansa Technik AG, a leading maintenance provider in aircraft maintenance, repair and overhaul, and MacroAsia Corporation, one of the Philippines' leading providers of aviation support services and catering for foreign airlines, owned by Lucio Tan, the majority owner of PAL. LTP currently maintains an eight-bay hangar and workshops occupying 110,000 square meters (1,200,000 sq ft) at Ninoy Aquino International Airport.

Currently all A320 family aircraft, including all A321 aircraft that are already delivered and those to be delivered, are being maintained by Lufthansa. PAL Express is the budget arm of PAL and has overtaken PAL in 2012 in domestic seats second only to Cebu Pacific (5J).

On May 18, 2018, PAL signed a deal with Lufthansa Technik Philippines to maintain its new Airbus jets for 12 years. The deal, which took effect on May 31, is estimated to be worth ₱13.6 billion ($260 million) during its lifespan.
