= Philippine Airlines =

Flag carrier airline of the Philippines

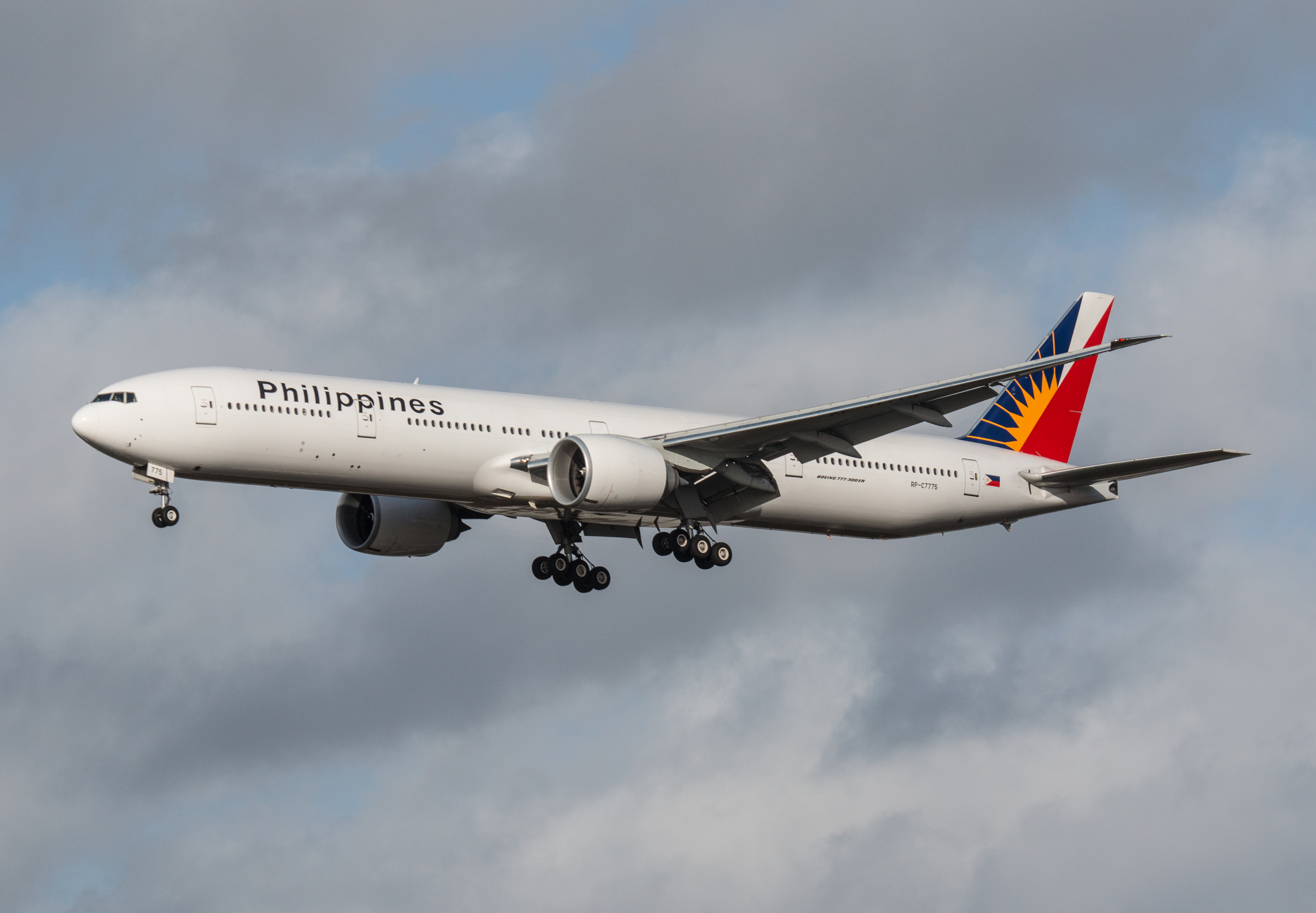
- A Philippine Airlines Boeing 777-300ER
IATA	ICAO	Call sign
PR	PAL	PHILIPPINE
- Founded: February 26, 1941; 85 years ago (Note: While the airline considers 1941 as its founding year, its earliest predecessor—the Philippine Aerial Taxi Company (PATCO), from which it acquired its operating franchise—was established nearly 11 years earlier, on December 3, 1930.)
- Commenced operations: March 15, 1941; 85 years ago
- AOC #: 2009001
- Hubs: Ninoy Aquino International Airport
- Secondary hubs: Mactan–Cebu International Airport
- Frequent-flyer program: Mabuhay Miles
- Subsidiaries: PAL Express
- Fleet size: 53
- Destinations: 73 (including PAL Express)
- Parent company: LT Group (PAL Holdings, Inc.)
- Traded as: PSE: PAL (Note: In official filings (i.e. to the Philippine Stock Exchange & Securities and Exchange Commission), "PAL" refers to the operating entity while PHI is to the immediate parent company. While PHI was assigned PAL for the ticker symbol, it is not itself the airline company.)
- Headquarters: Lucio K. Tan Jr. Center, Andrews Avenue, Pasay, NCR, Philippines
- Key people: Lucio C. Tan Sr. (PAL & PAL Holdings Chairman & CEO); Lucio C. Tan III (PAL Holdings President & COO); Richard Nuttall (PAL President); Atty. Carlos Luis L. Fernandez (PAL COO)
- Founder: Andrés Soriano
- Revenue: ▼ ₱170.38 billion (2024)
- Operating income: ▼ ₱9.44 billion (2024)
- Net income: ▼ ₱8.12 billion (2024)
- Total assets: ▼ ₱213.26 billion (2024)
- Total equity: ▲ ₱42.89 billion (2024)
- Employees: ▲6,520 (2024)
- Website: philippineairlines.com

Notes
- Financials are from the immediate parent holding company (PAL Holdings, Inc.) listed in the PSE - the airline itself (Philippine Airlines Inc.) is not listed(i.e. privately-held). As such, the publicly-disclosed figures might not fully reflect financial conditions of the airline proper.

Philippine Airlines (PAL; Spanish: Líneas Aéreas Filipinas) is the flag carrier of the Philippines. The airline was founded in 1941 and is the oldest operating commercial airline in Asia. (Note: Although Air India could claim to be Asia's oldest airline if it is considered as a continuation of Tata Air Services/Tata Airlines which was founded in 1932, the modern-day airline was only established in 1946 — five years after Philippine Air Lines/Philippine Airlines. Furthermore, even if the histories of predecessor companies were taken into account, PAL would still be older than Air India, as its forerunner – the Philippine Aerial Taxi Company (PATCO) – was founded in 1930, two years before Tata Air Services.)

Philippine Airlines launched its first flight on March 15, 1941, using a Beechcraft Model 18 aircraft from Manila to Baguio. After a brief suspension during World War II, the airline resumed operations in 1946 and became the first Asian airline to cross the Pacific, with a flight from Manila to Oakland, United States. PAL was designated as the country's flag carrier in the late 1940s and expanded rapidly in the decades that followed. In 1966, PAL was privatized when then-chairman Benigno Toda Jr. acquired a majority stake. However, in 1977, the airline was re-nationalized when the Government Service Insurance System obtained the majority of its shares. The airline underwent privatization again in 1992, when it was purchased by a group led by Antonio Cojuangco. Subsequent ownership changes occurred, with businessman Lucio Tan eventually becoming the majority stockholder in the mid-1990s.

Over the years, PAL has undergone periods of expansion and restructuring, responding to economic downturns, fuel price volatility, and regional competition. The airline has implemented multiple modernization programs focused on fleet renewal, route expansion, and service upgrades. In February 2018, Skytrax recognized Philippine Airlines as a four-star airline. Philippine Airlines has accepted Oneworld's invitation to join the alliance in 2027.

The airline's main flight operations are based at Ninoy Aquino International Airport in Metro Manila. It primarily operates international routes across Asia, North America, and Oceania, along with select domestic sectors—including Cebu, Bacolod, Davao, Cagayan de Oro, Iloilo, General Santos and Puerto Princesa—while the majority of domestic flights are operated by its subsidiary, PAL Express.

== History ==
Philippine Airlines (PAL) was established on February 26, 1941, as Philippine Air Lines, following the acquisition of its operational franchise from the Philippine Aerial Taxi Company (PATCO) by a group of businessmen led by Andrés Soriano and Ramón J. Fernández in conjunction with Pappy Gunn.

In late 1977, PAL was nationalized upon the acquisition of majority shares by the Government Service Insurance System; on November 16, 1977, President Ferdinand Marcos designated GSIS general manager Roman A. Cruz Jr. as PAL CEO and chairman.

Once among Asia's largest carriers, PAL was significantly impacted by the 1997 Asian financial crisis. Facing substantial financial losses, the airline undertook major restructuring measures: terminating services to Europe and the Middle East, suspending most domestic routes except those operating from Manila, reducing its fleet size, and laying off thousands of employees. In September 1998, PAL ceased operations temporarily and entered receivership. Operations resumed in October 1998, and over time, the airline reinstated many of its domestic and international routes. PAL successfully exited receivership in 2007 after implementing a rehabilitation plan approved by the Securities and Exchange Commission. Subsequently, the airline has undertaken several management restructurings aimed at reestablishing its position as a leading carrier in the Asia-Pacific region.

=== Leadership history ===
==== Chairmen ====
- Ramón J. Fernández (1940s)
- Eduardo Romualdez (1954 – 1961)
- Benigno P. Toda Jr. (January 1962 – November 1977)
- Roman A. Cruz Jr. (November 1977 – May 1982)
- Eduardo Romualdez (May 1982 – February 1986)
- Jose Antonio Gonzales (March 1986 – 1988)
- Catalino Macaraig Jr. (1988 – 1990)
- Feliciano Belmonte Jr. (1990 – 1991)
- Antonio "Tonyboy" Cojuangco (March 1992 – March 1993)
- Carlos "Sonny" Dominguez III (March 1993 – January 1995)
- Lucio Tan (January 1995 – present)

==== Chief executive officer ====
- Andrés Soriano (1941; 1945–1960)
- Benigno Toda Jr. (1962 – November 1977)
- Roman A. Cruz Jr. (November 1977 – February 1986)
- Dante G. Santos (March 1986 – 1990)
- Feliciano Belmonte Jr. (1990 – March 1992)
- Antonio "Tonyboy" Cojuangco (March 1992 – March 1993)
- Carlos "Sonny" Dominguez III (March 1993 – January 1995)
- Lucio Tan (January 1995 – present)

== Corporate affairs ==
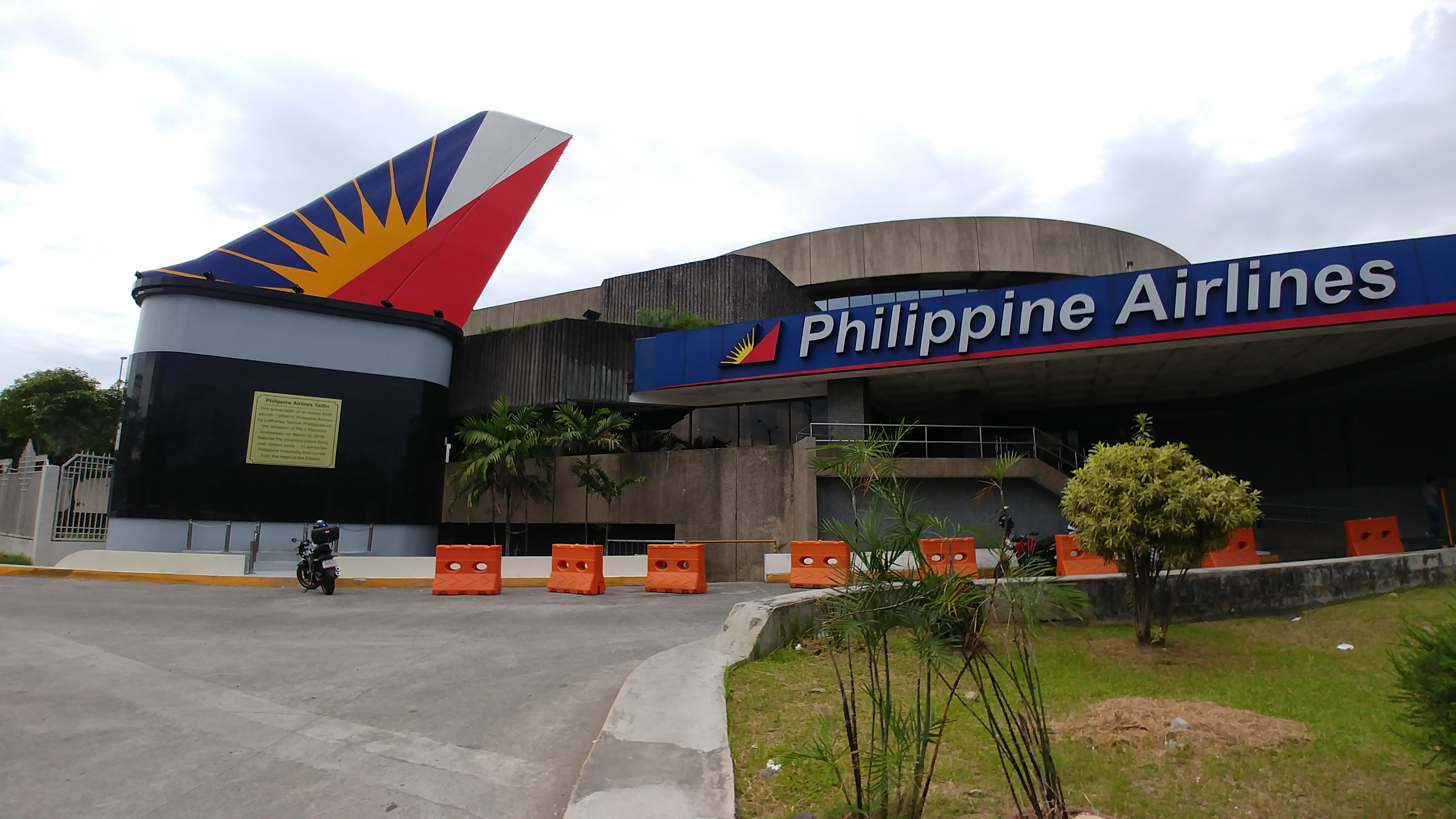
The entrance to the former Philippine Airlines head office in Pasay

Philippine Airlines Inc.(PAL) is owned by PAL Holdings, Inc. (PHI) (PSE: PAL), a holding company responsible for the airline's operations. PAL Holdings is part of a group of companies owned by business tycoon Lucio Tan. ANA Holdings, the holding company of All Nippon Airways, holds a stake of 4.5% in PAL Holdings diluted from its initial ownership of 9.5% back in early 2019.

Since early 2024, the airline (along with its parent holding company PHI) has been headquartered at the Lucio K. Tan Jr. Center, along Andrews Avenue in Pasay. In 2017, PAL was the ninth-largest corporation in the Philippines in terms of gross revenue, as ranked by BusinessWorld. As of December 31, 2024, PAL had 6,520 employees.

In 2007, PAL was the 61st largest airline in the world by revenue passenger kilometers (RPKs), recording over 16 billion RPKs from 21 billion available seat kilometers (ASKs), with an average load factor of 76 percent.

=== Business highlights ===
Philippine Airlines/PAL Holdings business highlights
Financial performance (PHP billions)
Fiscal year	2014	2015	2016	2017	2018	2019	2020	2021	2022	2023	2024
Revenue	100.9	107.2	114.5	129.5	150.5	154.5	55.3	58.7	139.2	179.1	178.0
Expenses	98.6	98.4	104.8	132.2	156.5	151.7	81.8	62.8	121.9	151.0	160.0
Income before tax	0.3	6.7	7.1	−6.5	−7.4	−11.2	−65.9	53.7	10.6	21.8	9.4
Net income	0.1	6.7	4.9	−6.5	−3.7	−9.7	−73.1	60.6	10.4	21.3	8.1
Assets	109.2	114.4	125.3	179.9	199.1	317.8	227.9	193.8	206.0	219.7	213.3
Liabilities	105.5	104.3	111.2	166.0	188.4	312.9	296.0	192.2	194.2	186.4	170.4
Equity	3.7	10.1	14.1	13.9	10.7	4.9	−68.1	1.6	11.8	33.3	42.9
Operating highlights
Fiscal year		2015	2016	2017	2018	2019	2020	2021	2022	2023	2024
Passengers (million)		11.9	13.3	14.5	15.9	16.7	3.9	2.9	9.3	14.7	15.6
Available seats (million)		17.5	19.2	20.3	20.5	21.8	6.8	6.8	12.9	18.1	19.7
Load factor (%)		68.3	69.2	71.4	77.4	76.5	56.7	42.6	72.0	81.0	79.1
RPK (million)		28,301	32,503	36,973	40,003	42,329	11,873	7,680	24,860	35,338	35,377
ASK (million)		41,439	46,996	51,793	51,682	55,308	20,918	18,023	34,538	43,734	44,737

Note

- Data before 2014 were excluded from the table as figures before that year were compounded using a different fiscal year period.

== Network ==
In 1980, Philippine Airlines operated flights to several European destinations, such as Amsterdam, Athens, Frankfurt, London–Gatwick and Rome–Fiumicino. Following the 1997 Asian financial crisis, PAL terminated a number of its long-haul routes. In 1998, Cathay Pacific temporarily operated some of PAL's international services for a 14-day period during the latter's operational shutdown.

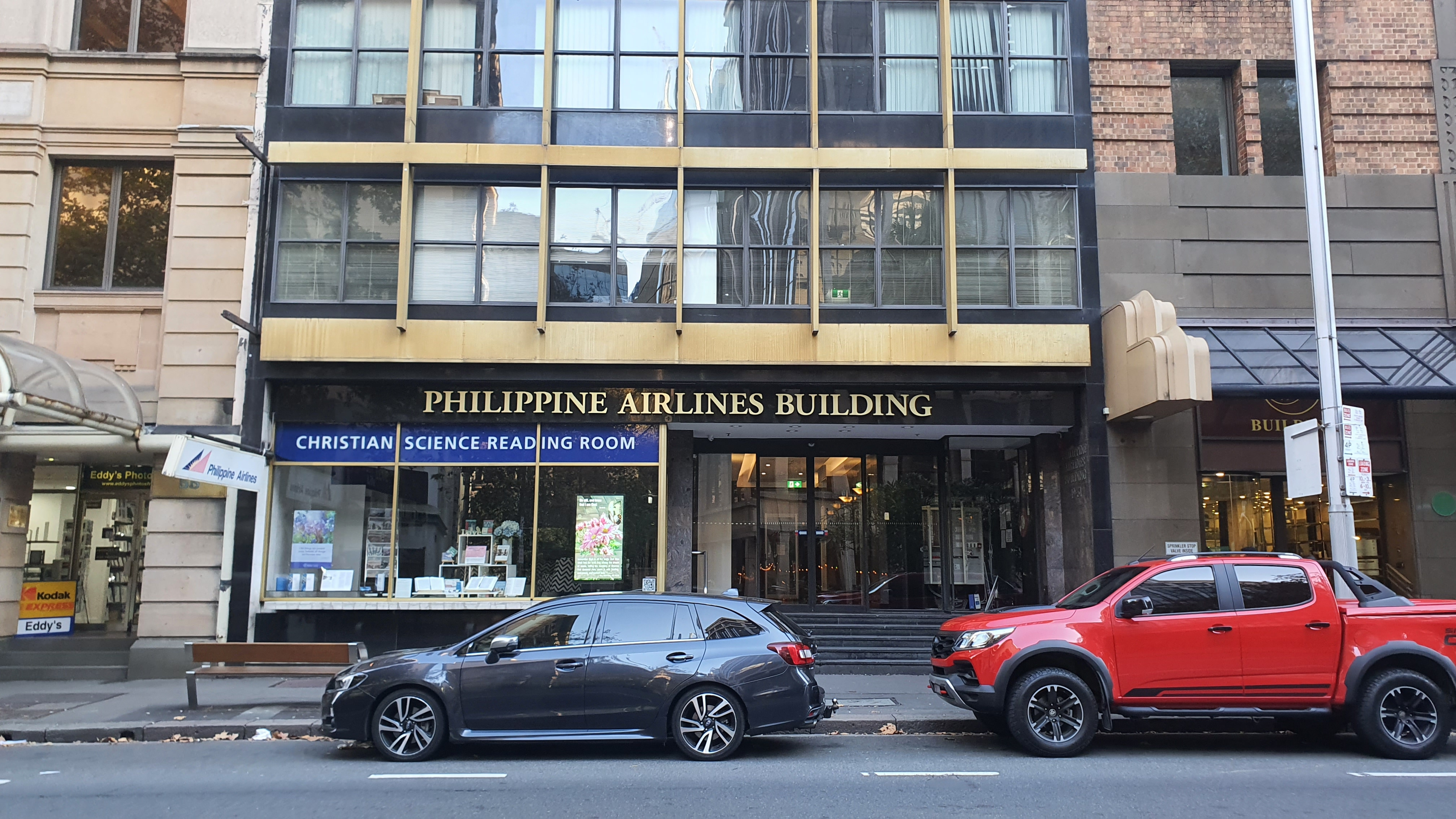
Philippine Airlines building in Sydney

In 2010, the European Union (EU) imposed a ban on all Philippine-based carriers, citing regulatory concerns, despite favorable safety assessments from the International Civil Aviation Organization. The ban was lifted in 2013, allowing Philippine Airlines to resume European operations. That same year, PAL relaunched flights to London–Heathrow in 2013 using a Boeing 777-300ER. On October 29, 2018, the airline inaugurated non-stop service to New York–JFK with an Airbus A350-900, marking one of the longest commercial flights in the world at the time.

As of 2025, Philippine Airlines operates 41 international and 32 domestic routes. Its regional subsidiary, PAL Express, handles the majority of the airline's domestic operations.

=== Codeshare agreements ===
Philippine Airlines codeshares with the following airlines:

- Air Macau
- Alaska Airlines
- All Nippon Airways
- American Airlines
- Bangkok Airways
- Cathay Pacific
- China Airlines
- Garuda Indonesia
- Gulf Air
- Hawaiian Airlines
- Malaysia Airlines
- Qatar Airways
- Royal Brunei Airlines
- Saudia
- Singapore Airlines
- Turkish Airlines
- Vietnam Airlines
- WestJet
- XiamenAir

=== Interline agreements ===
Philippine Airlines interlines with the following airlines:

- Solomon Airlines
- Southwest Airlines

== Fleet ==
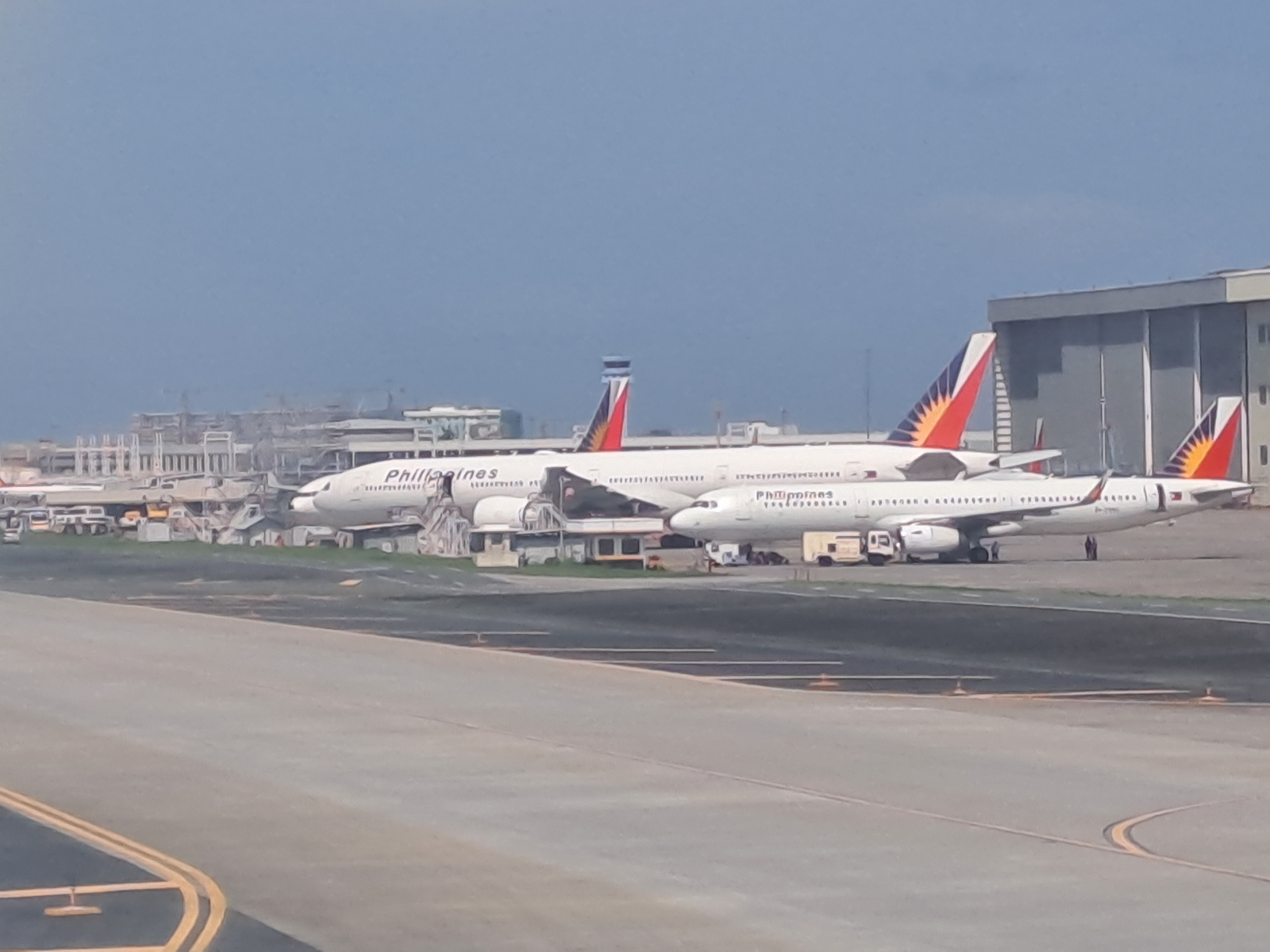
Aircraft of Philippine Airlines parked outside of the maintenance hangars of Lufthansa Technik Philippines

As of November 2026, the mainline Philippine Airlines fleet consists of 53 aircraft and has a further 42 aircraft on order. The fleet consists of Airbus narrow-body and wide-body aircraft, and Boeing wide-body aircraft.

== Branding ==
=== Logo ===
The Philippine Airlines logo changed several times since the company's founding. Its first logo incorporated a blue oval with "PAL" superimposed in white letters, a four-pointed star with points intersecting behind the "A" in PAL, and a wing whose orientation varied depending on the location of the logo. The wing pointed to the right if located on the left side of the plane, and to the left if on the right side. A variant of this logo featured a globe instead of the blue oval with the superimposed PAL initials. It was used from the 1950s through the mid-1960s.

In the late 60's, the company adopted a blue triangle with the bottom point missing and a red triangle superimposed upon it, enclosed by a circle. This was meant to evoke a vertically displayed national flag with white forming by the negative space between the two triangles. In 1970, the logo adopted a new typeface, Futura, and remained the official PAL logo until 1986.

The current PAL logo features the same two blue and red sail triangles used in the second and third logos. An eight-rayed yellow sunburst was superimposed on top of the blue triangle, and a new Helvetica typeface was used.

1950–1960

1967–1970

1970–1986

1986–present

=== Livery ===
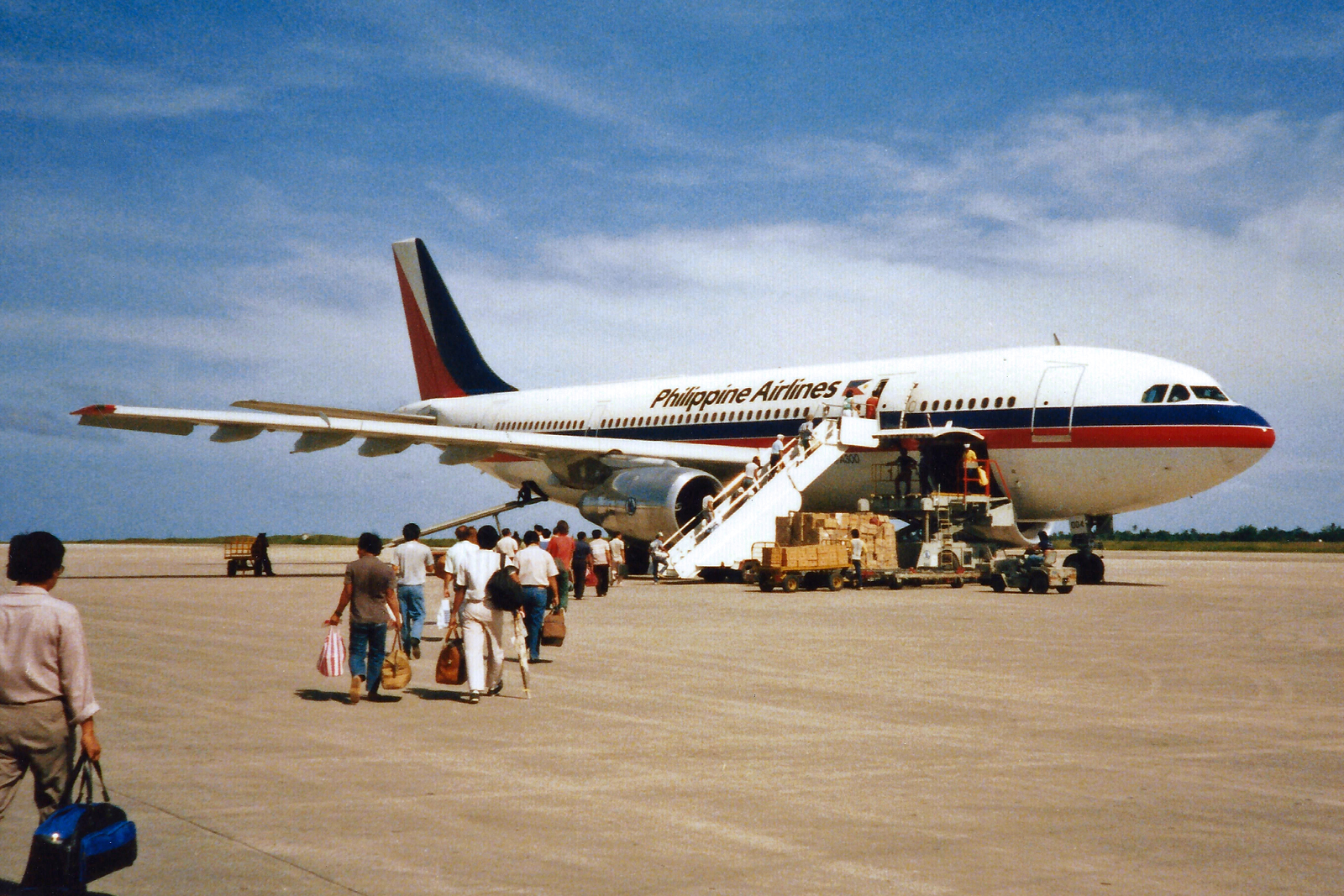
A Philippine Airlines Airbus A300 in 1986 with the airlines' old livery.

PAL liveries have undergone many incarnations. The first PAL aircraft bore a simple white-top, silver-bottom livery separated by solid straight cheatlines, with a small Philippine flag superimposed on the tail. The name "Philippine Air Lines" was superimposed on the upper forward portion of the fuselage and the PAL logo was located at the back. Later variants of the livery, especially on PAL jet aircraft, made use of an extended Philippine flag as cheatlines, with the PAL logo superimposed on the tail. By this time, the name "Philippine Airlines" was used in the livery.

Another variant of the original livery used by PAL is somewhat similar to the current livery. However, it uses PAL's third logo on the tail with blue, white, and red cheatlines running the center of the fuselage. Later on, the bottom half of the fuselage was also painted white.

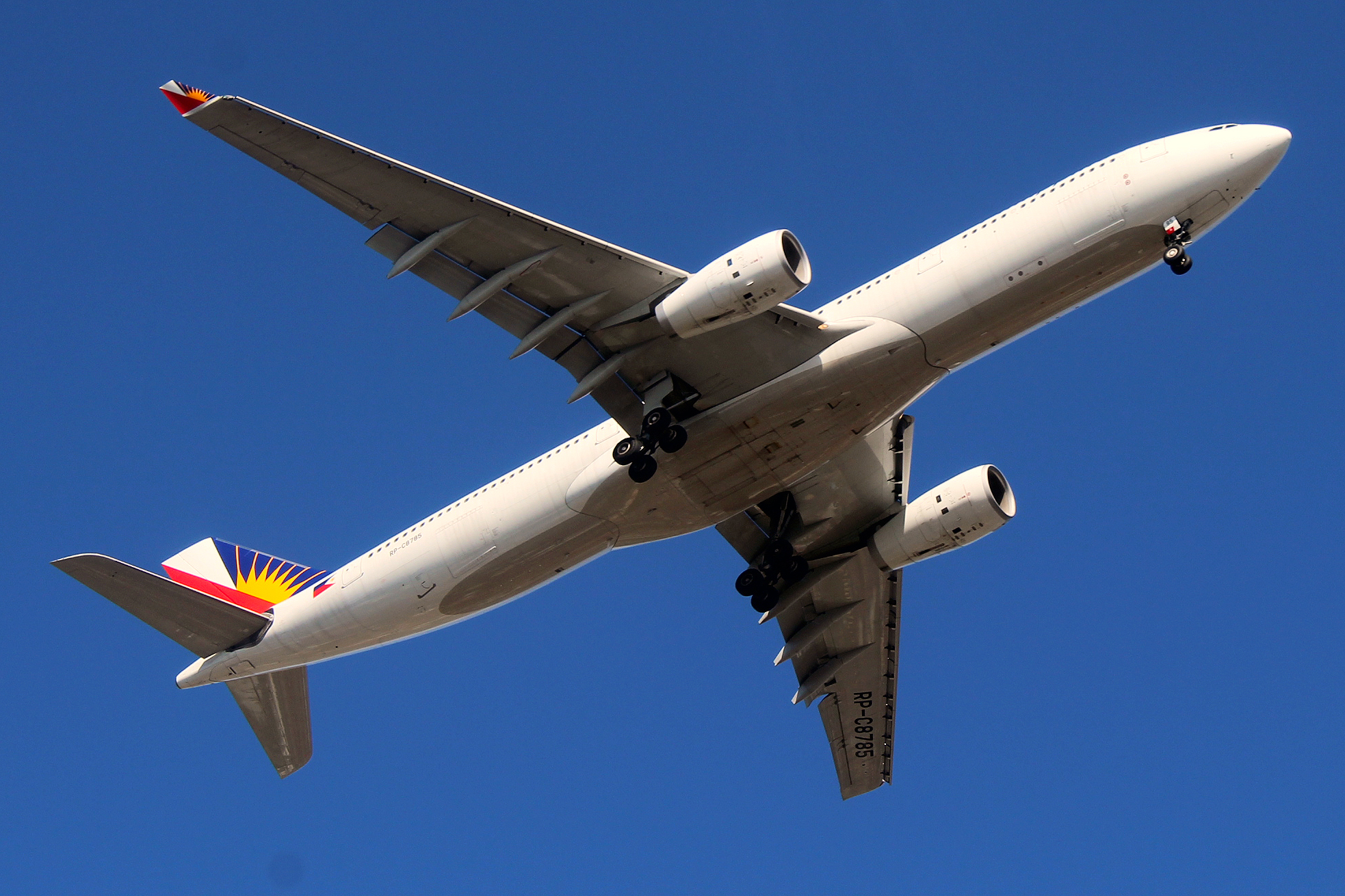
A Philippine Airlines Airbus A330-300

The current "Eurowhite" livery, first used with the Short 360, was adopted in 1986 following PAL's corporate rebranding. This livery, (designed by Landor Associates) has "Philippines" superimposed on the forward portion of the fuselage in italics (using the PAL logo typeface), while the tail is painted with the logo and the Philippine flag is visible near the rear of the aircraft. The PAL logo is also painted on the winglets of aircraft that have them. The name "Philippines", instead of "Philippine Airlines", is to denote that PAL is the primary flag carrier of the Philippines. However, this sometimes leads to confusion that a PAL plane, especially when chartered by the President for official or state visits, is, in fact, the official air transport of the Philippine head of state. Any PAL aircraft with the flight number "PR/PAL 001" and the callsign "PHILIPPINE ONE" is a special plane operated by Philippine Airlines to transport the President or Vice President of the Philippines. The flight number "PR/PAL 002" and the callsign "PHILIPPINE TWO" are used if the Vice President travels simultaneously with the President. As such, the presidential seals are patched on or near the L1 and R1 doors of any PAL aircraft chartered by the president.

For the airline's 70th anniversary in 2011, a special decal was placed on all of its aircraft. The sticker featured a stylized "70" and the words, "Asia's first, shining through". For its 75th anniversary in 2016, a special decal was put on the back of every aircraft. The sticker features a stylized "75". PAL also placed a 4-star Skytrax sticker on its aircraft to celebrate its new rating. For the airline's 85th anniversary in 2026, first seen on RP-C3510, the airline's first Airbus A350-1000, a stylized 85 appears at the rear half of the fuselage.

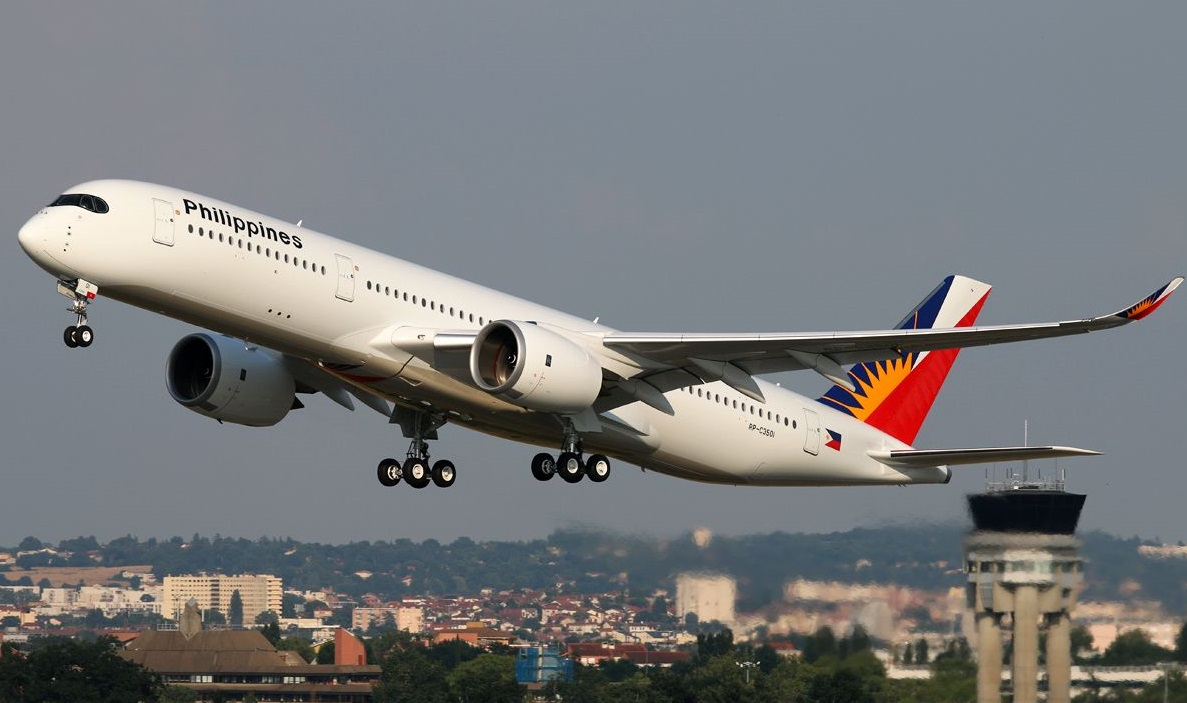
A Philippine Airlines Airbus A350-900

In February 2019, Philippine Airlines rolled out its fifth Airbus A350 aircraft with a LoveBus decal that represents the 40th anniversary of its partnership with Airbus and to celebrate the airline's signature heartfelt service. The kiss-marked LoveBus logo was also placed in 1979 on one of PAL's Airbus A300s that represented their first year of partnership with Airbus. Its LoveBus A350 was rolled out from the paint shop and was accepted on February 14, 2019, Valentine's Day. PAL took delivery of it three days later, and held a welcoming ceremony at Ninoy Aquino International Airport Terminal 2.

== Frequent-flyer program ==
Mabuhay Miles logo

Mabuhay Miles is Philippine Airlines' frequent-flyer program. It was established in 2002 after merging all of PAL's existing frequent flyer programs before the Asian financial crisis. Mabuhay Miles are divided into multiple tiers: Classic, Elite, Premiere Elite, and Million Miler. Philippine National Bank (PNB) issues co-branded credit cards, debit cards, and prepaid cards that offer benefits such as free mileage points, travel insurance, priority check-in, access to a Mabuhay Lounge, and discounts when booking flights on the Philippine Airlines website. Prior to PNB, HSBC Philippines offered co-branded HSBC Philippine Airlines credit card.

=== Mabuhay Lounge ===
The Mabuhay Lounge is the airport lounge for Philippine Airlines. These lounges have open bars, food catering, Wi-Fi, and charging ports for personal electronic devices. Mabuhay Miles Elite, Premier Elite, and Million Miler members can use the lounge, alongside Business and Comfort Class (for domestic flights) passengers.

As of June 2026, there are Mabuhay Lounges in Ninoy Aquino International Airport, Puerto Princesa International Airport, Bacolod–Silay Airport, Mactan–Cebu International Airport, Laguindingan Airport, General Santos International Airport, Francisco Bangoy International Airport, and Iloilo International Airport. On December 5, 2023, the airline opened its new flagship lounge in NAIA Terminal 1, with an exclusive room for Million Milers.

== In-flight services ==
=== Cabin ===
Philippine Airlines currently offers three classes of service: business, premium economy, and economy, depending on the aircraft. Airbus A321s (on domestic routes), reconfigured Airbus A330s, and Airbus A350s offer three classes, while its other aircraft offer two classes. On September 15, 2022, the airline rebranded its premium economy service to Comfort Class for its domestic flights.

On January 23, 2017, PAL announced a new cabin layout designed in collaboration with LIFT Strategic Design, with major upgrades to its existing business class and economy seats, alongside a new premium economy class. This new design was rolled out through the reconfiguration of eight of its A330s from a single class 414-seater into a 309-seater tri-class layout within seven months by Lufthansa Technik Philippines. The first A330 with the new layout was introduced to service on June 15, 2017, on the route between Manila and Honolulu. This design would become the foundation for PAL's aircraft cabins in the Airbus A321neos and A350s.

For older aircraft without embedded IFE displays on their seats, the airline offered rentable (in economy) or complementary (in business class) iPad Minis with OnAir's wireless IFE solution, OnAir Play, while also allowing passengers to stream content to their own devices. New and reconfigured aircraft have personal IFE screens alongside wireless IFE, a decision attributed to the failure of PAL's wireless IFE program for long-haul flights. The airline uses the Panasonic eX2 system for its Boeing 777s, and the Zodiac Aerospace (now Safran) RAVE system for its more recent aircraft.

=== Business class ===
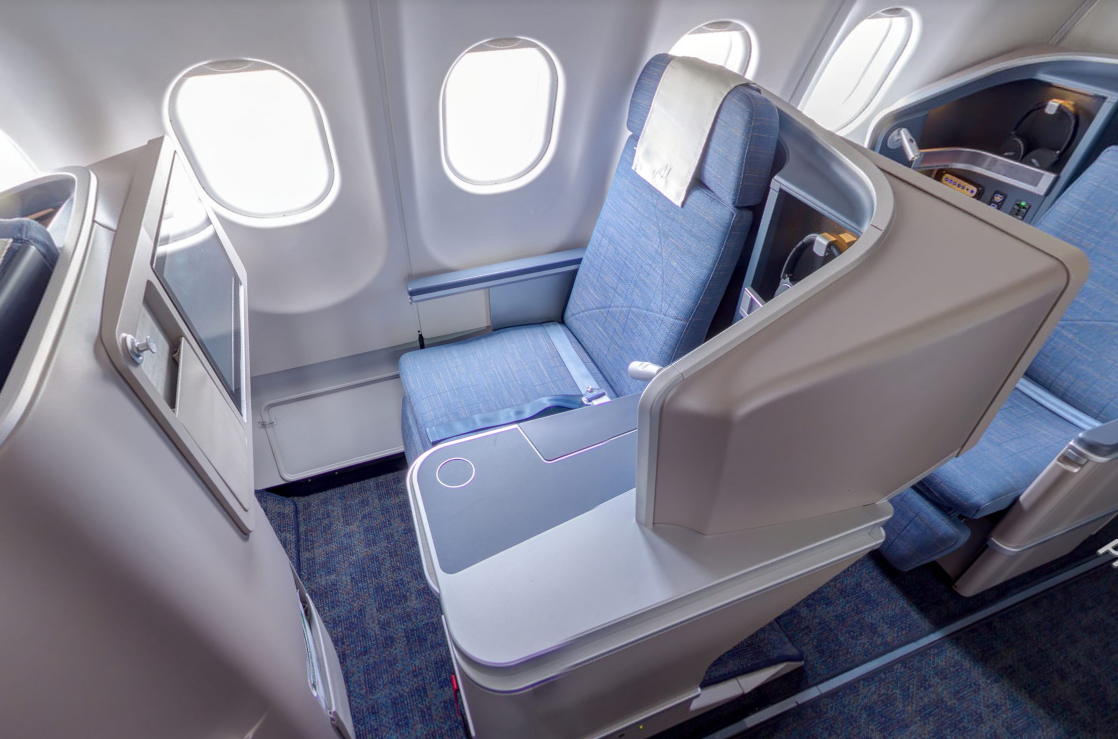
Business class seats on an Airbus A330

Business class is available on all aircraft. It offers increased legroom and lie-flat seats on the Airbus A330, Boeing 777, Airbus A350, and select Airbus A321neo aircraft. Philippine Airlines is the only Philippine carrier to offer business class on domestic flights. On medium-haul and long-haul flights, Philippine Airlines provides amenity kits from L'Occitane en Provence.

Seats on early Boeing 777s feature angled-flat seats manufactured by Recaro, while some of the latest aircraft feature lie-flat seats by Zodiac Aerospace, arranged in a 2-3-2 configuration. Older A330s featured lie-flat seats manufactured by Sogerma in a 2–2–2 configuration. Reconfigured A330s and A350-900s feature lie-flat seats manufactured by Thompson Aero Seating, in a seating configuration of 1–2–1. A350-1000 aircraft feature lie-flat seats called "Mabuhay Studios" manufactured by Collins Aerospace with sliding privacy doors in a 1–2–1 reverse herringbone seating configuration; each seat measures 44 inches (110 cm) in pitch and 20.25 inches (51.4 cm) in width. Long-range variants of A321neos feature lie-flat seats manufactured by Rockwell Collins (now Collins Aerospace), arranged in a 2-2 layout. They have a 60-inch seat pitch and a maximum seat width of 23 inches when fully flat. Business class seats on standard A321neos and A321ceos recline and have a seat pitch of 39 inches (99 cm).

Seats feature 13.3-inch (reconfigured A321ceo), 15.4-inch (A321neo), 15-inch (Boeing 777), 18.5-inch (reconfigured A330 and A350-900), and 20-inch (A350-1000) personal IFE monitors with video on demand, as well as in-seat power. The seats feature a USB port where passengers can charge mobile devices. Passengers are also given noise-cancelling headphones. A350-900 and A330 business class seats also feature Lantal air cushions, a four-way headrest, a storage shelf for personal belongings, a headphone hook, and a padded inner shell that absorbs noise.

=== Premium economy ===
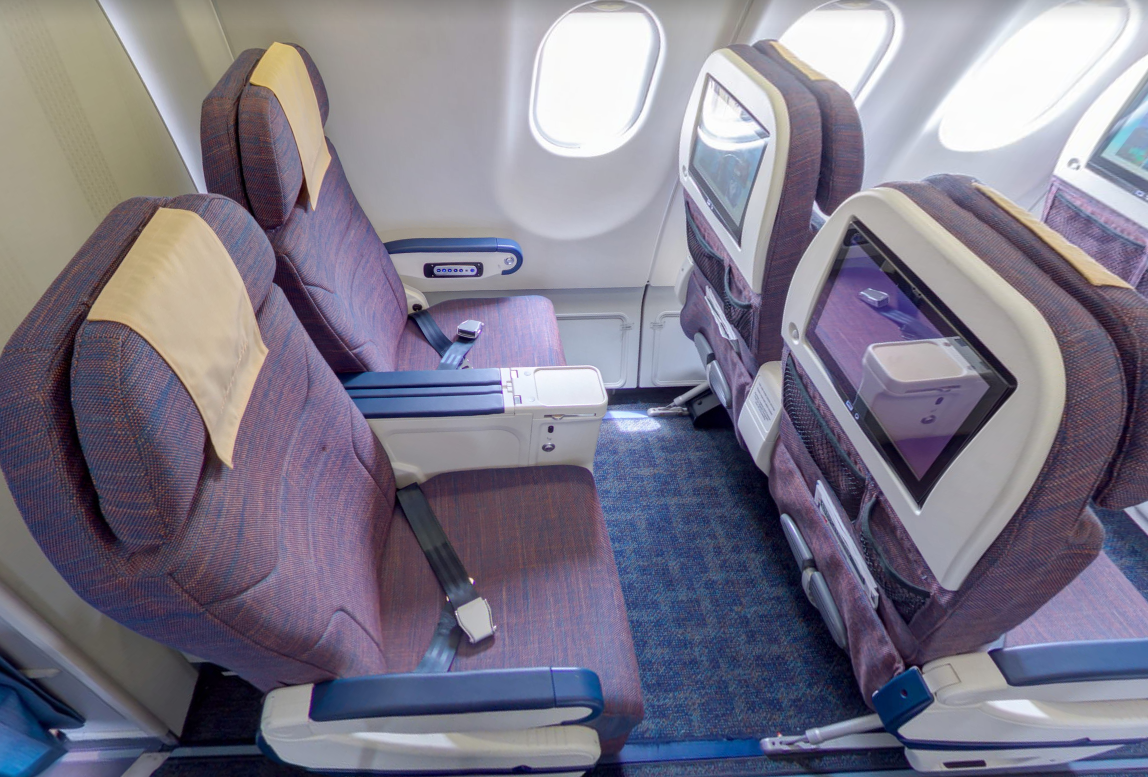
Premium economy class seats on an Airbus A330

Premium economy is available on the Airbus A330 and Airbus A350; it is also available on all narrowbody aircraft used by the airline for domestic routes, where it is known as Comfort Class. The seats are similar in design to standard economy class seats but feature at least four to five inches of additional legroom, providing a minimum legroom of 34 to 36 inches.

Reconfigured A330s, as well as A350s, have a different seat design with a layer of extra padding. It is 9.55" wide, pitched at 38 inches with eight inches of recline. The seats also feature a 13.3-inch screen-flight entertainment unit with video on demand, a headphone jack, a USB port, and in-seat power. On aircraft without IFE, passengers are also treated to complimentary iPads.

=== Economy class ===
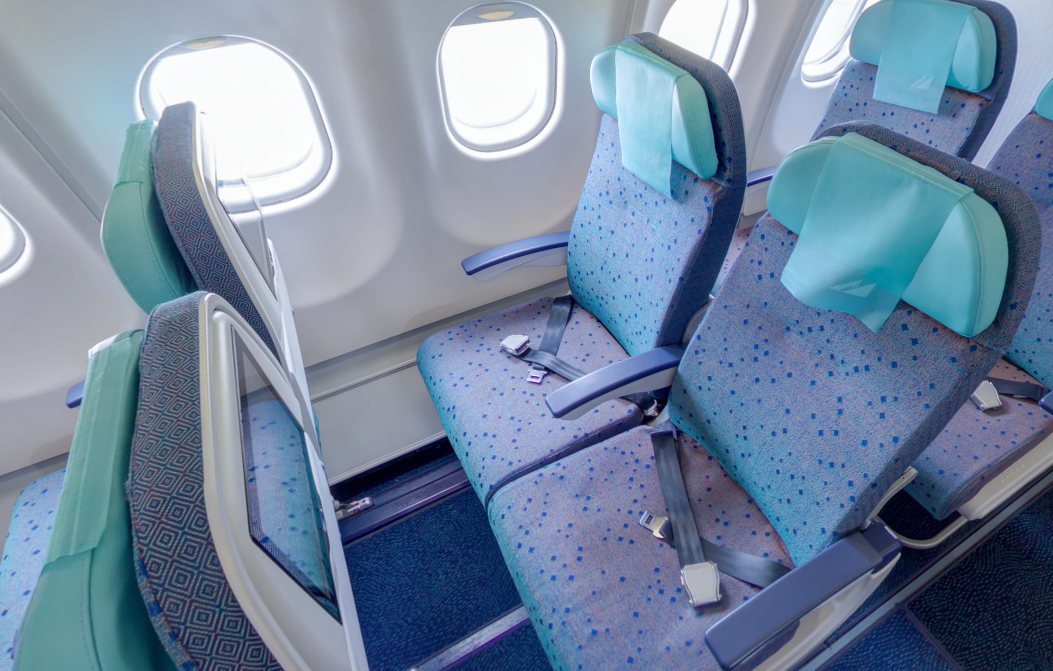
Economy class seats on an Airbus A330

Economy class is available on all aircraft. Tray tables are found in the back of the seat in front, except for bulkhead and exit seats, where tray tables are embedded in the seats. The seats offer a pitch that varies between 31 and 34 inches. Each seat offers video on demand and is equipped with 9-inch (Boeing 777), 10-inch (A321neo and reconfigured A330 and A321ceo), 11.6-inch (A350-900), or 13.3-inch (A350-1000) monitors with a headphone jack and USB port for charging. They have four-way headrests and six inches of recline. An articulating seat bottom cushion comes with extra foam under the seat cover.

== Accidents and incidents ==
Although Philippine Airlines aircraft have been involved in a string of accidents since its founding in 1941, the majority of airline accidents have occurred with propeller aircraft during the airline's early years of operations. Few PAL jet aircraft have been involved in accidents, the most notable being the explosion onboard Philippine Airlines Flight 434, masterminded by al-Qaeda through Project Bojinka. One life was lost, and the aircraft was deemed to be in repairable condition.

=== Safety ===
In February 2007, PAL was the first airline in the Philippines to be accredited by the International Air Transport Association, passing the IATA Operational Safety Audit (IOSA). Philippine Airlines has the highest safety rating of 7/7 according to AirlineRatings.com and was rated a safer airline than some of its Southeast Asian counterparts.

== Issues ==
=== Financial issues ===
PAL experienced significant financial losses in the late 2000s. On March 31, 2006, PAL's consolidated total assets amounted to ₱100,984,477, a 200% decrease from March 31, 2010. On March 31, 2013, the company's consolidated assets continued to diminish by 8%, an amount equivalent to ₱92,837,849, compared to 2007 figures. The decline of PAL's assets was primarily due to a net decrease in property and equipment and advance payments to aircraft and engine manufacturers. On March 31, 2001, other current and noncurrent assets fell by 29% to ₱2,960.4M and by 20% to ₱2,941.7M "due to the effect of re-measurement to the fair value of certain financial assets and derivative instruments". After carrying 17% more passengers in 2009 due to acquisition of additional aircraft and growth in the local market, PAL annual income report showed an increase in revenues of US$1.634 billion from US$1.504 billion in 2008. Despite this, PAL expenses escalated as a result of more flight operations and higher maintenance costs aggravated by fuel price fluctuations; forty-four percent (44%) of PAL income operating expenditures is utilized for fuel consumption.

=== Labor issues ===
PAL has a history of labor relations problems. On June 15, 1998, PAL retrenched 5,000 employees, including more than 1,400 flight attendants and stewards to reduce costs and alleviate the financial downturn in the airline industry. Represented by the Flight Attendants and Stewards Association of the Philippines (FASAP), retrenched employee sought remedy through the judicial process, filing a complaint on the grounds of unfair labor practices and illegal retrenchment. It took a decade before the suit was finally settled. It passed the Labor Arbiter to the National Labor Relations Commission, then on to the Court of Appeals, and the Supreme Court. The Philippine Highest Tribunal favored the aggrieved party and on July 22, 2008, in its 32-page decision ordered PAL to:

Reinstate the cabin crew personnel who were covered by the retrenchment of and demotion scheme of June 15, 1998, made effective on July 15, 1998, without loss of seniority right and other privileges, and to pay them full back wages, inclusive of allowances and other monetary benefits computed from the time of their separation up to the time of actual reinstatement, provided that those who have received their respective separation pay, the number of payments shall be deducted from their back wages.

The Supreme Court ruling explained that there was a failure on the part of PAL to substantiate its claims of actual and imminent substantial losses. Although the Asian financial downturn severely affected the airline, PAL's defense of bankruptcy and rehabilitation was considered untenable; hence, the retrenchment policy was deemed unjustified. On March 26, 2018, the Supreme Court en banc voted in favor of Philippine Airlines, which affirms the 2006 Court of Appeals decision that says Philippine Airlines is not required to consult FASAP for its criteria for its retrenchment program.

=== Competition ===
For more than twenty years, PAL monopolized the air transport industry in the Philippines. This ended in 1995 through the passage of Executive Order No. 219 which permitted the entry of new airlines into the industry. The liberalization and deregulation of the Philippine airline industry brought competition into the domestic air transport industry resulting in lower airfares, improvements in the quality of services, and efficiency in the industry in general. At present, three airlines are competing in international and major domestic routes: PAL, Cebu Pacific, and PAL Express. Several airlines serve the minor and short-distance routes including Philippines AirAsia and Cebgo.

== See also ==
- List of airlines of the Philippines
- List of companies of the Philippines
- Transportation in the Philippines
