= Nayong Pilipino =

Nayong Pilipino may refer to:

- Nayong Pilipino Foundation, state-owned corporation which ran cultural parks.
- Old Nayong Pilipino, defunct cultural theme park in Pasay
- Nayong Pilipino Clark, cultural theme park in Pampanga
- Nayong Pilipino Cultural Park and Creative Hub, planned cultural theme park in Parañaque
