= Nayong Pilipino Cultural Park and Creative Hub =

Planned theme park

- Interactive map of Nayong Pilipino Cultural Park and Creative Hub
- Location: Entertainment City, Parañaque, Metro Manila, Philippines
- Coordinates: 14°31′03.0″N 120°59′02.2″E
- Status: Planned
- Owner: Nayong Pilipino Foundation
- Theme: Filipino culture

The Nayong Pilipino Cultural Park and Creative Hub is a planned cultural theme park to be built at the Entertainment City in Parañaque, Metro Manila, Philippines.

== History ==
The Nayong Pilipino Foundation (NPF) owns a property in the Entertainment City in Parañaque, Metro Manila, which is formally known as the Bagong Nayong Pilipino–Entertainment City Manila. The reclaimed area is meant to host an integrated casino, hotel, retail and entertainment complex. Among the developments in the area is the Solaire Resort & Casino and Okada Manila casino resorts.

The NPF which operated a cultural park near Ninoy Aquino International Airport, planned to build a replacement in its Entertainment City property. The NPF had a project for a tourism-oriented New Nayong Pilipino approved by the National Economic and Development Authority in 2016, to be built under a Public-private partnership.

=== NayonLanding ===
NPF entered in an agreement with to build a cultural theme park with a casino with Hong Kong-based Landing International. Landing International was granted a provisional license by government-run casino regulator PAGCOR in July 2018 despite President Rodrigo Duterte's directive not to issue new casino permits in earlier in the same year. This meant that the development, dubbed NayonLanding would only be allowed to operate in 2022 at earliest.

Under NPF chairperson, Patricia Ocampo, a groundbreaking ceremony was held for the NayonLanding development, but on the same day President Rodrigo Duterte removed all board members of the NPF from their post. Duterte concluded that the alleged 70-year lease deal between the NPF and Landing was "grossly disadvantageous". Ocampo in response said that lease length was actually 25 years, renewable for another 25 years and that the lease rate the government would receive from the project is ₱570 per square meter, higher than Resorts World Manila and Solaire. Presidential spokesperson Harry Roque added that the project was contrary to President Duterte's earlier directive against casinos. The deal between the NPF and Landing was cancelled a year later.

=== Cultural Park and Creative Hub ===
President Duterte reaffirmed his position that a New Nayong Pilipino park should have no casino component in October 2019. A project for the Nayong Pilipino Cultural Park and Creative Hub was approved by Duterte's Cabinet. At around this time, the NPF is coordinating with the Tourism Infrastructure and Enterprise Zone Authority (TIEZA) of the Department of Tourism (DOT) to come up with a plan which includes a creative hub for artists and cultural workers.

=== COVID-19 pandemic ===
The NPF temporarily stopped progress on the Nayong Pilipino Cultural Park and Creative Hub project in October 2020 amidst the COVID-19 pandemic in the Philippines. The site was also named as possible area where a quarantine facility could be built as part of the government's response against the pandemic. The Inter-Agency Task Force for the Management of Emerging Infectious Diseases (IATF-EID) approved the construction of a temporary vaccination facility at the site in April 2021 through a public-private venture.

In May 2021, International Container Terminals Services, Inc. (ICTSI) Foundation led by businessman Enrique K. Razon emerged as the government's private partner that would help set up a vaccination center in the NPF site. The NPF itself opposed such plans over concerns that trees in the area would be cut down. In response, the ICTSI Foundation, the IATF-EID and DOT said that the vaccination site would be built on a vacant area and not affect any trees. The ICTSI Foundation hired the services of architect and environment planner Felipe Palafox Jr. for the facility.

The vaccination site was launched as the Solaire ICTSI Foundation, Inc. Vaccine Center with drive-thru vaccination beginning on August 12, 2021. It is planned to have a capacity to inoculate 15,000 people daily dependent on the vaccine supply. Ambulatory service is projected to commence in September 2021.
