= Old Nayong Pilipino =

Former cultural theme park in Metro Manila

Nayong Pilipino Cultural Park
- Interactive map of Nayong Pilipino Cultural Park
- Location: Pasay, Metro Manila, Philippines
- Coordinates: 14°30′52″N 121°0′30″E
- Status: Defunct
- Opened: 1970; December 12, 2004 (reopening)
- Closed: 2002; Unknown (second closing)
- Owner: Nayong Pilipino Foundation
- Theme: Filipino culture
- Area: 22.3 ha (55 acres)

The Old Nayong Pilipino, officially the Nayong Pilipino Cultural Park, was a cultural theme park near Ninoy Aquino International Airport in Pasay, Metro Manila.

== Operational history ==
The organization that ran the theme park in Pasay, the Nayong Pilipino Foundation was established through Presidential Decree 37 which was issued by then-President Ferdinand Marcos on November 6, 1972. The theme park itself, beside Manila International Airport (now Ninoy Aquino International Airport) was opened in 1970. The theme park proper covered an area of 22.3 hectares (55 acres) while the whole property associated with the facility measures 45.9 hectares (113 acres).

In 1991, the recorded number of visitors at the Nayong Pilipino reached one million, a figure which was sustained until 1994. However visitors to the park have declined by the end of 1995. In 1993, then-President Fidel V. Ramos, issued Proclamation No. 273 which directed the Nayong Pilipino Foundation to conduct a year-long fundraising campaign due to the deteriorating state of the Nayong Pilipino's facilities.

The moving of the Nayong Pilipino was first proposed in 1999. then-Tourism Secretary Gemma Cruz Araneta proposed moving the theme park at the Clark Special Economic Zone in Pampanga at the site of the Expo Filipino. However such plans were shelved after President Joseph Estrada underwent an impeachment trial. The relocation of the park was revived again the following year, after the Manila International Airport Authority made it known that it had to construct additional facilities for Ninoy Aquino International Airport (NAIA) to comply with safety standards imposed by the International Civil Aviation Organization.

The theme park was closed in 2002, after a taxiway and service road was built on 9 hectares (22 acres) of the facility for the Terminals 2 and 3 of NAIA. The Tagalog Region, MIndanao Pavilion, Bohol area, and select Visayan sites such as the Magellan Cross were demolished.

Nayong Pilipino briefly opened again on December 12, 2004, after a ₱600 thousand clearing and renovation works. By this time among the attractions that still exist were the Bicol, Cordilleras, Ilocos regions, an aviary, a children's playground, a picnic area and some lagoons. The reopening was done in line with the Christmas season. The park was later closed again but a Nayong Pilipino theme park was later opened at the Clark Freeport Zone in Pampanga.

In December 2024, San Miguel Infrastructure (SMHC) and PAGCOR signed a 25-year lease for the 15-hectare Nayong Pilipino Cultural Park. The renovation and infrastructure development includes PAGCOR's 40,000-square-meter headquarters on a two-hectare parcel of land.

== Theme and attractions ==
The Nayong Pilipino was conceptualized by then First Lady Imelda Marcos to be a cultural theme park showcasing Filipino culture. At its peak the park was divided into six different zones or "regions"; Ilocos, Cordillera, Tagalog, Bicol, Visayas and Mindanao. It was designed by Ildefonso P. Santos, who would later be recognized as a National Artist of the Philippines. It also hosted the Museum of Philippine Traditional Culture of the office of the Presidential Assistant on National Minorities which closed in 1983, an aviary and an aquarium.

The theme park was touted as the first of its kind in Southeast Asia. It featured models of tourist destinations of the country such as the Mayon Volcano in Albay province, the Banaue Rice Terraces in the Cordilleras, the historic houses of Vigan, Ilocos Sur, the Chocolate Hills of Bohol, and the Magellan's Cross in Cebu.
