= Nayong Pilipino Clark =

Cultural theme park in the Philippines

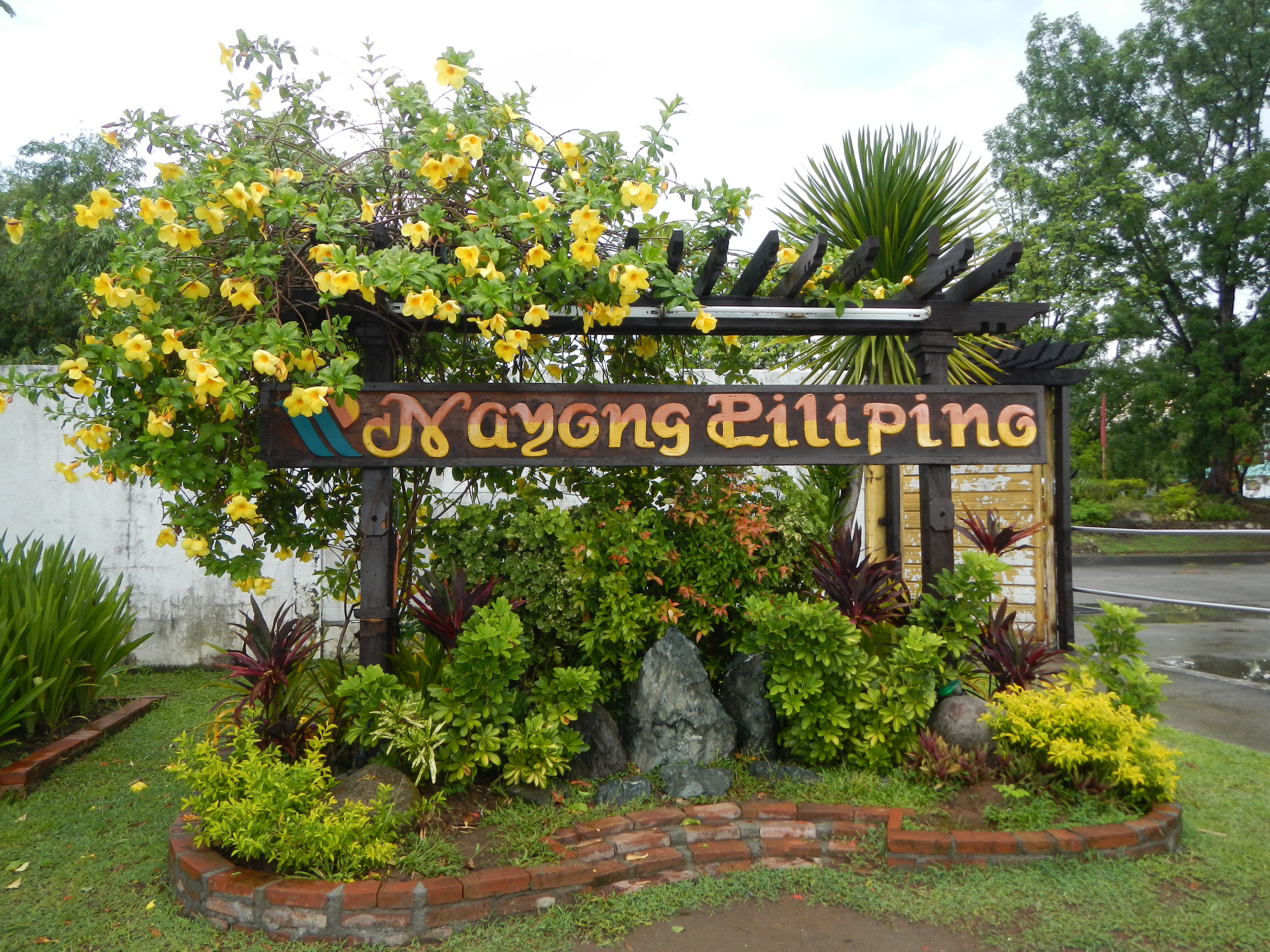
- Interactive map of Nayong Pilipino Clark
- Location: Mabalacat, Clark Freeport Zone, Pampanga
- Coordinates: 15.203°N 120.530°E
- Area: 3.5 ha (8.6 acres)
- Opened: 2007; 2014 (reopening)
- Owner: Nayong Pilipino Foundation
- Operator: Nayong Pilipino Foundation; Clark Development Corporation
- Status: Temporarily closed. Under renovation

The Nayong Pilipino Clark, also known as the New Nayong Pilipino, is a cultural park featuring themed areas of Filipino culture at the Clark Freeport Zone in Mabalacat, Pampanga.

== History ==
The Nayong Pilipino Foundation (NPF) originally was maintained a cultural theme park in Pasay which was closed by then-President Gloria Macapagal Arroyo in July 2002 through Executive Order No. 11. The same decree mandated the NPF to look for an alternative site for a theme park to replace the Old Nayong Pilipino. The cultural theme park was inaugurated and opened as the Nayong Pilipino sa Clark Expo (NPCE) by Arroyo on December 22, 2007 at the site of the former Expo Pilipino within the Clark Freeport Zone in Pampanga.

The attraction later became dormant until it was redeveloped and reopened as Nayong Pilipino Clark in 2014. The redevelopment which took place for 30 months was a result of a Memorandum of Agreement (MOA) between the NPF and the Clark Development Corporation signed in March 2012. President Benigno Aquino III led the signing of the MOA.

In anticipation of the 2019 Southeast Asian Games which is to be hosted primarily in the Clark area, the theme park was closed for renovation in April 2019 and was set to be reopen as the "Nayon Clark Park" in October 28 the same year. However the park has yet to open as of August 2021.

== Attractions ==
The Nayong Pilipino Clark's attraction centers around Philippine history and culture and covers an area of 3.5 hectares (8.6 acres). The Money Museum features present and historical Philippine currency; while the Textile Museum exhibits local textiles. It also hosts replicas of select national landmarks such as Rizal Shrine in Calamba, Laguna, Mabini Shrine in Tanauan, Batangas, and the Barasoain Church. It also hosts replicas of "villages" of select indigenous groups such as the Ifugao, Kalinga, and the Aeta peoples where their respective culture is showcased (e.g. their craft, textile, and indigenous dances).

The cultural park also provides picnicking and green areas where performances of traditional dances such as the malong, sayaw sa bangko, singkil, and tinikling or more contemporary performances such as the Dakilang Lahi and the Philippine Fiesta parade are exhibited.
