= Nayong Pilipino Foundation =

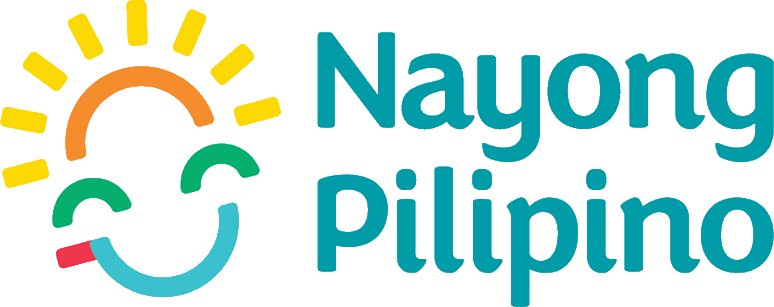

Corporation overview
- Formed: May 7, 1969; 57 years ago (SEC registration); November 6, 1972; 53 years ago (through P.D. No. 32)
- Type: Non-profit corporation
- Headquarters: Plaza San Luis Complex, General Luna Street, Intramuros, Manila
- Corporation executive: Lucille Karen E. Malilong, Chairperson
- Parent department: Department of Tourism
- Key document: Presidential Decree No. 37, s .1972
- Website: nayongpilipino.gov.ph

The Ang Nayong Pilipino Foundation Inc. (NPFI), simply known as the Nayong Pilipino Foundation (NPF) or Nayong Pilipino is a non-profit organization based in Manila, Philippines.

It is an autonomous government corporation under the Department of Tourism.

== Background ==
The Nayong Pilipino Foundation Inc. (NPFI) was established primarily for the promotion of research development project on social sciences, humanities and other related fields. It was registered with the Securities and Exchange Commission on May 7, 1969, as a non-stock, non-profit corporation. Then-President Ferdinand Marcos issued Presidential Decree No. 37 establishing the Nayong Pilipino Foundation on November 6, 1972. Within the same year, the organization was given a 45.9 hectares (113 acres) of land in Pasay, a portion of which stood the Nayong Pilipino Cultural Park.

The organization operated the cultural park, now referred to as the Old Nayong Pilipino, was later ordered to close and cease operation by then-President Gloria Macapagal Arroyo through Executive Order No. 111 which was dated on June 26, 2002. The park maintained in overseeing, maintaining, and preserving its assets. After the closure of the original Nayong Pilipino cultural park, 8.6 hectares (21 acres) of the associated property was transferred to the Manila International Airport Authority.

President Arroyo issued Executive Order No. 615 on April 2, 2007 which obliged the transfer of the Nayong Pilipino Cultural Park to the 15 hectares (37 acres) property of the Philippine Reclamation Authority (PRA) in Parañaque to be swapped with the NPF's property of the same acreage.

On September 29, 2011, the then-President Benigno Aquino III issued Executive Order No. 58 mandating the NPF to transfer to the Manila International Airport Authority (MIAA) the remaining land presently occupied by the foundation. On July 2, 2012, MIAA had taken possession of the land and on December 31, 2012, MIAA took over the administrative building and other structures of NPF.

The Nayong Pilipino Foundation entered into an agreement with the National Parks Development Committee (NPDC), a Department of Tourism-attached agency in December 2012. As part of the agreement the NPF moved its administrative office to the Orchidarium on January 10, 2013.

== Cultural parks and developments ==
=== Nayong Pilipino Cultural Park ===
The original Nayong Pilipino Cultural Park was located near Ninoy Aquino International Airport which featured Filipino culture and tourist attractions. The Old Nayong Pilipino closed in the early 2000s. The area occupied by the park was absorbed by the nearby airport's expansion.

=== Nayong Pilipino Clark ===
The Nayong Pilipino Foundation established presence at the Clark Expo site in Pampanga in 2006. The NPF was designated as the manager and operator of the Colonial Plaza and the Chosen Island segments of the exposition site. However the attraction later became dormant.

President Benigno Aquino III led the signing of a memorandum of agreement between the NPF and the Clark Development Corporation to redevelop the foundation's park at the Clark Freeport Zone in March 2012 and the site was refurbished in 30 months. The New Nayong Pilipino was inaugurated in 2014.

=== Rizal Park Orchidarium ===
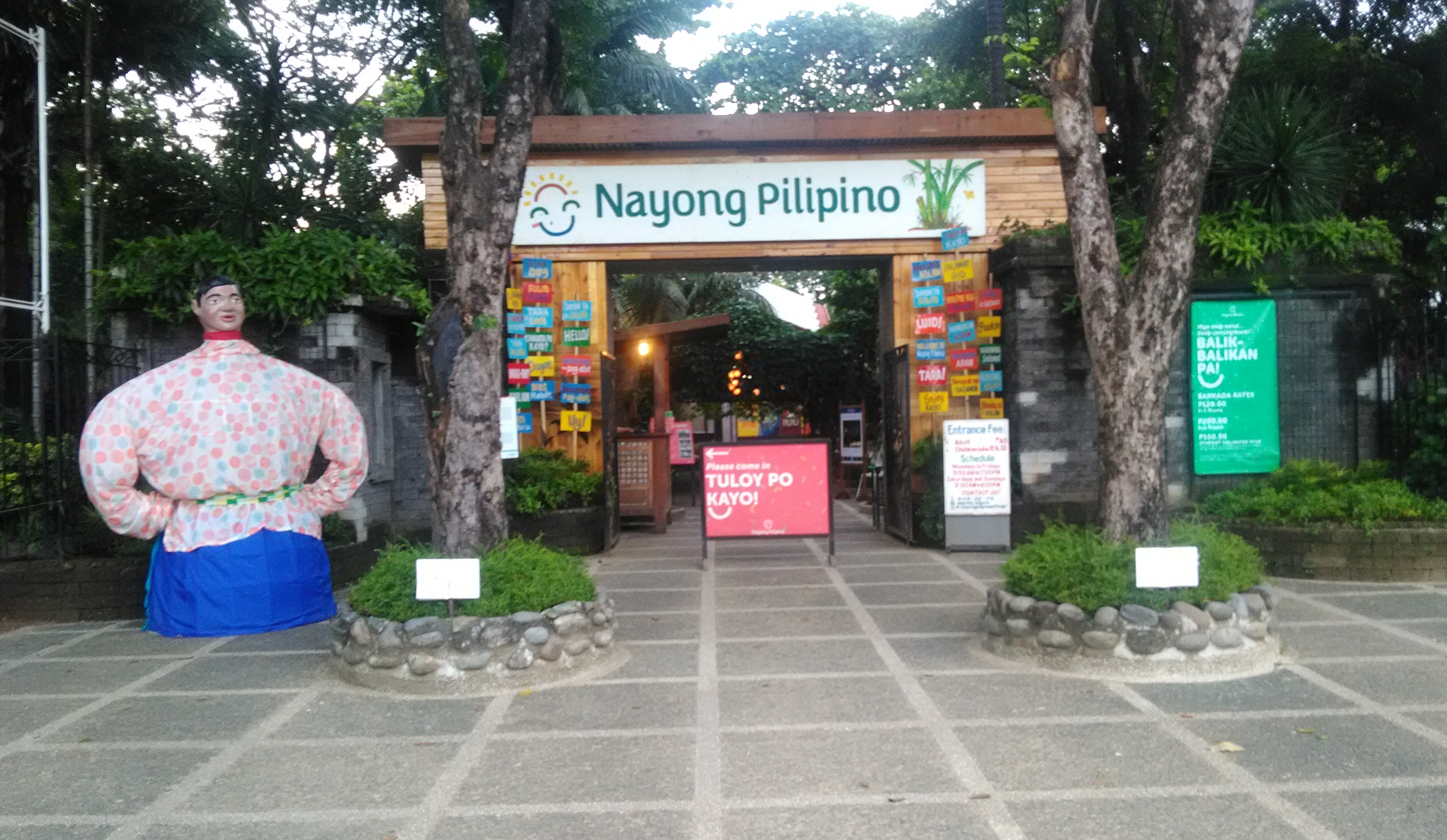
The Orchidarium in Rizal Park under management of the Nayong Pilipino.

The Nayong Pilipino Foundation manages the Orchidarium in Rizal Park in Manila, where it also holds its administrative office since 2013 under an agreement with the National Parks Development Committee

=== Entertainment City ===
The Nayong Pilipino Foundation planned to set up a cultural park at the Entertainment City in Parañaque under a private-public partnership (PPP) model as approved by the National Economic and Development Authority (NEDA). However such plan was scrapped when the board which made the proposal was replaced by another composed of appointees of President Rodrigo Duterte with Patricia Yvette Ocampo as chair.

The NPF under that board entered into an agreement with Landing Resorts Philippines Development Corp., a locally based subsidiary of Hong Kong-based Landing International Development Ltd. which is a holder of a provisional license to operate a casino issued by the Philippine Amusement and Gaming Corporation. Under the deal, the NayonLanding, a mixed-use development consisting of a casino, a resort, a cultural park and an indoor theme park will be built. The groundbreaking for the complex took place on August 7, 2018. The following day, the members of the whole board were dismissed from their post by President Duterte over alleged irregularities on the lease contract.

The NPF's land at Entertainment City was temporarily used a site for a vaccination center for the response against the COVID-19 pandemic. The vaccination facility, funded by the International Container Terminal Services Foundation began operations on August 10, 2021.
