= Manila International Airport Authority =

Transportation agency in the Philippines

Agency overview
- Formed: March 4, 1982; 44 years ago
- Type: Government instrumentality and regulatory agency
- Headquarters: Pasay, Philippines
- Agency executive: Eric Jose Ines, General Manager
- Parent department: Department of Transportation
- Website: www.miaa.gov.ph

The Manila International Airport Authority (MIAA; Filipino: Pangasiwaan ng Paliparang Pandaigdig ng Maynila) is a government instrumentality and an agency under the Department of Transportation of the Philippines. It serves as the regulatory body for Ninoy Aquino International Airport (NAIA), formerly known as Manila International Airport—hence the agency's name.

== History ==
The Manila International Airport Authority (MIAA) was created by virtue of Executive Order No. 778 signed on March 4, 1982 by President Ferdinand Marcos, originally as a body meant to administer and operate the Manila International Airport (MIA). The issuance abolished the MIA Division of the Bureau of Air Transportation which previously fulfilled that role.

MIAA retained its name when the MIA was renamed as the Ninoy Aquino International Airport (NAIA) on August 17, 1987 via Republic Act No. 6639.

Logo used from 2018 to 2025

On October 10, 2018, the airport authority obtained its ISO certification under ISO 9001:2015 standards.

On September 14, 2024, New NAIA Infrastructure Corporation a private firm took over the NAIA's operations and management from MIAA. In October 2024, MIAA started transitioning to being a regulatory agency for the NAIA with assistance from the Asian Development Bank.

== See also ==
- Ninoy Aquino International Airport
- Civil Aviation Authority of the Philippines
- Department of Transportation
