= Ninoy Aquino International Airport =

Commercial airport serving Metro Manila, Philippines

Ninoy Aquino International Airport Paliparang Pandaigdig ng Ninoy Aquino

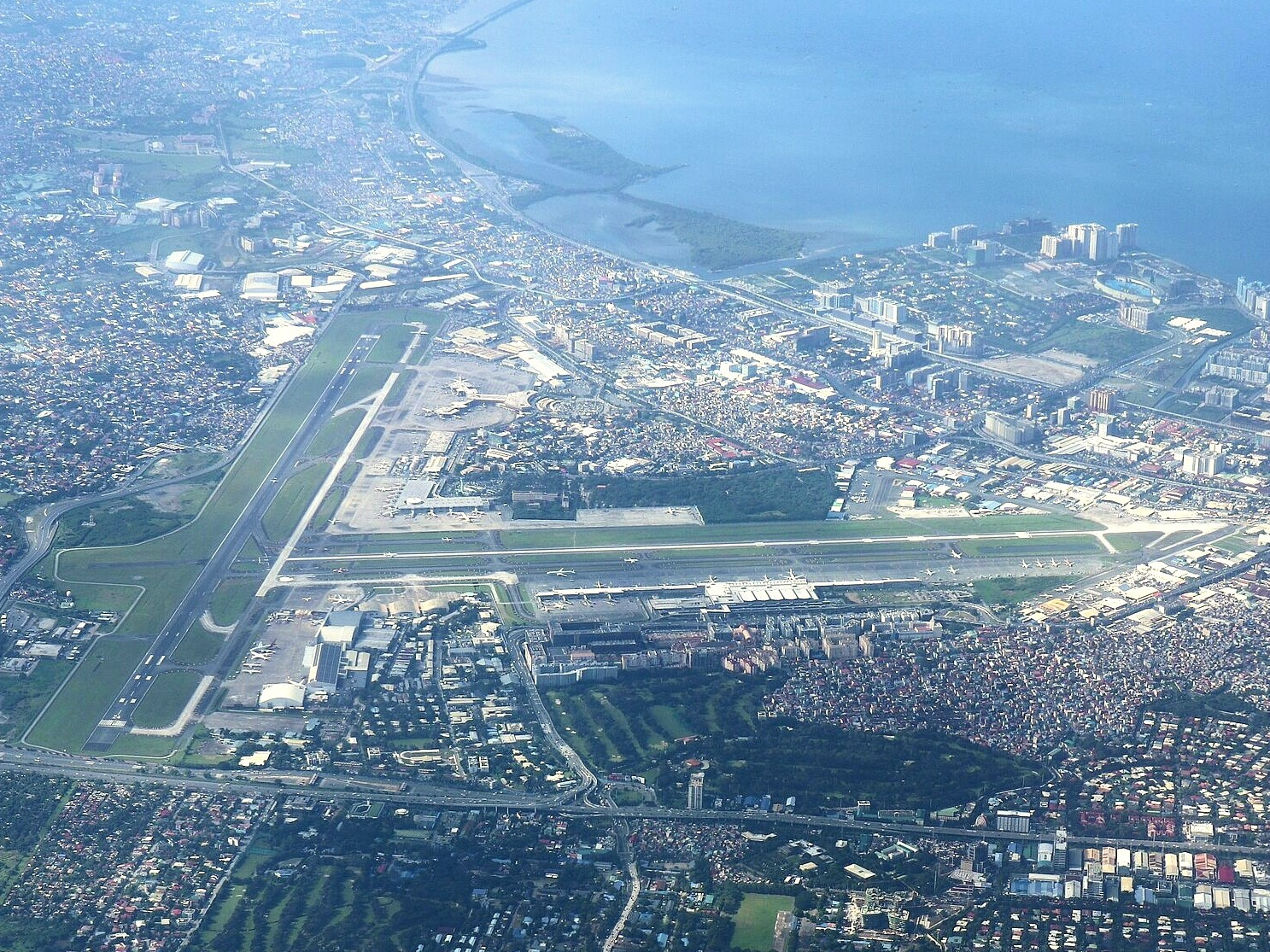
- Aerial view of NAIA from northeast in 2023
- IATA: MNL; ICAO: RPLL; WMO: 98429

Summary
- Airport type: Public / Military
- Owner: Manila International Airport Authority
- Operator: New NAIA Infrastructure Corporation
- Serves: Greater Manila Area
- Location: Parañaque and Pasay, Metro Manila, Philippines
- Opened: 1948; 78 years ago
- Hub for: PAL Express; Philippine Airlines
- Operating base for: Cebu Pacific; Philippines AirAsia
- Time zone: PHT (UTC+08:00)
- Elevation AMSL: 23 m (75 ft)
- Coordinates: 14°30′30″N 121°01′11″E
- Website: www.newnaia.com.ph

Maps
- Location within Metro Manila Location within Luzon Location within Philippines Location within Southeast Asia Location within Asia

Runways
Direction	Length		Surface
Direction	m	ft	Surface
06/24 (Note: Runway 06 is 3,514 meters (11,529 ft) long with a Clearway of 150 meters (490 ft) and has a displaced threshold of 105 meters (344 ft). Runway 24 is 3,514 meters (11,529 ft) long with a Stopway of 105 meters (344 ft) and clearway of 220 meters (720 ft).)	3,514	11,529	Asphalt/Concrete
13/31 (Note: Runway 13 is 2,249 meters (7,379 ft) long with clearway of 150 meters (490 ft) and runway end safety area included in strip length of 90 meters (300 ft).)	2,249	7,379	Asphalt/Concrete

Statistics (2024)
- Passengers: 50,356,465 ▲11.16%
- Aircraft movements: 293,433 ▲8.31%
- Cargo (in tonnes): 616,478.52 ▲26.88%
- Source: Manila International Airport Authority

Ninoy Aquino International Airport (NAIA /ˌnɑː.ˈiː.ə/ NAH-EE-ə; Filipino: Paliparang Pandaigdig ng Ninoy Aquino; IATA: MNL, ICAO: RPLL), also known as Manila International Airport (MNL) or Manila Airport, is the main international airport serving Metro Manila in the Philippines. Located between the cities of Pasay and Parañaque, about 7 kilometers (4.3 mi) south of Manila proper and southwest of Makati, it is the main gateway for travelers to the Philippines. It serves as a hub for Philippine Airlines and its regional subsidiary PAL Express. It is also the main operating base for Cebu Pacific, and Philippines AirAsia.

Opened in 1948, the airport was officially renamed for former Philippine senator Benigno "Ninoy" Aquino Jr., who was assassinated at the airport on August 21, 1983. NAIA is managed by the Manila International Airport Authority (MIAA), an agency of the Department of Transportation (DOTr). It is currently operated by the New NAIA Infrastructure Corporation (NNIC), a private consortium of companies led by San Miguel Corporation.

In 2024, NAIA served more than 50 million passengers, 47% more than the previous year and an all-time record high, making it the busiest airport in the Philippines, the 17th busiest in Asia, and the 38th busiest in the world. The airport is operating beyond its designed capacity of 35 million passengers, clogging air traffic and delaying flights. As a result, it has consistently been cited as one of the world's worst airports. In response, the airport’s operations and maintenance were privatized on September 14, 2024, with responsibility transferred to NNIC, which will also oversee the airport’s rehabilitation.

Both NAIA and Clark International Airport in Pampanga serve the Greater Manila Area. Additionally, two nearby projects, meant to reduce congestion at NAIA, are underway: one being the New Manila International Airport in Bulakan, Bulacan, and the other being to upgrade Sangley Point Airport in Cavite City into an international airport.

== History ==
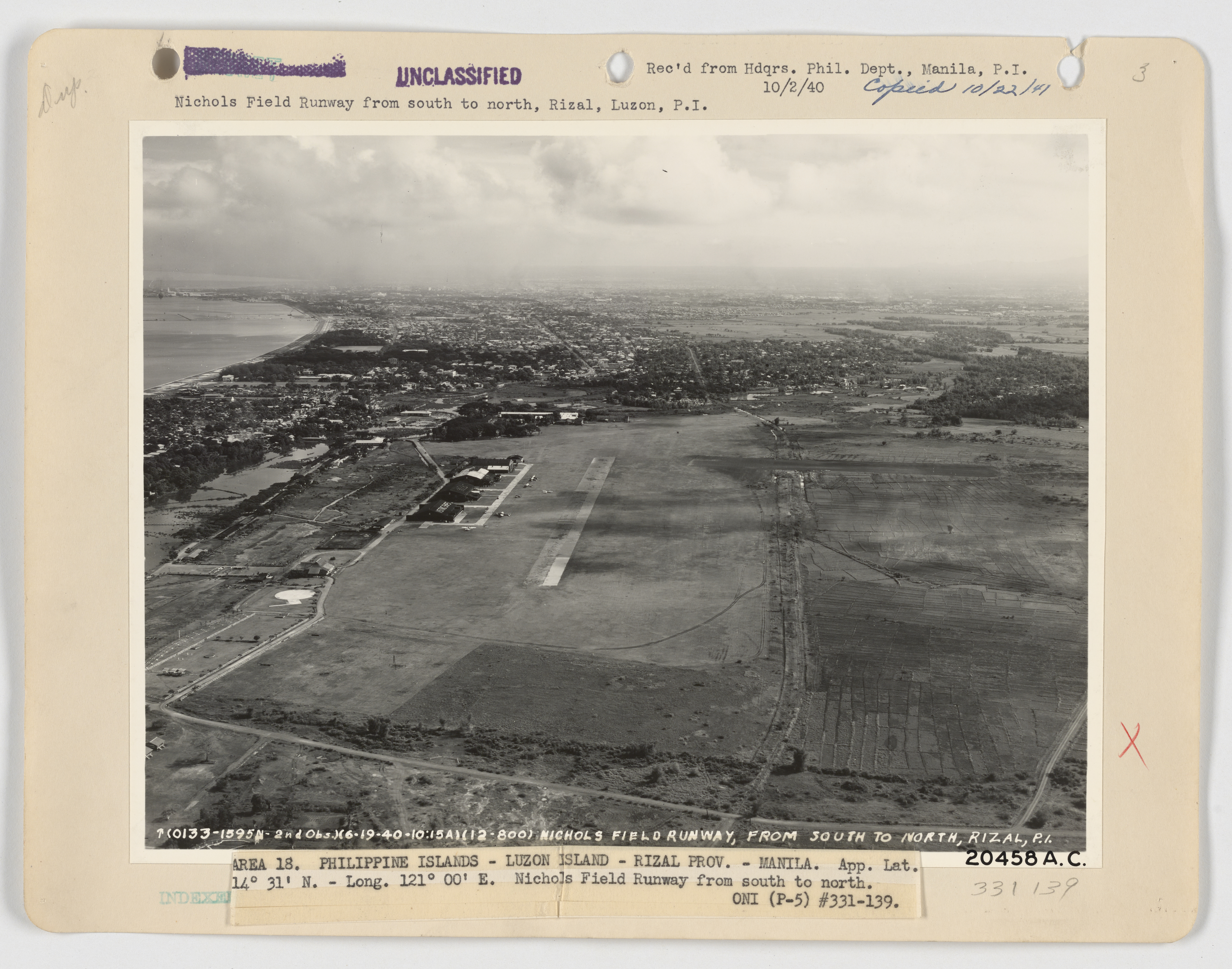
Nichols Field runway, currently Runway 13/31, with Pasay and Manila in the background, taken prior to 1941

=== Early history ===
Manila's original airport, Grace Park Airfield (also known as Manila North) in Grace Park, Caloocan (then a municipality of Rizal), opened in 1935. It was the city's first commercial airport and was used by the Philippine Aerial Taxi Company (later Philippine Airlines) for its first domestic routes.

In July 1937, Nielson Airport, located in the 45-hectare (4,800,000 ft^{2}) land in Makati, also then in Rizal, was inaugurated and served as the gateway to Manila; its runways now form Ayala Avenue and Paseo de Roxas. Following World War II and Philippine independence, Grace Park Airfield ceased operations, while Nielson Airport continued to operate until it was decommissioned in 1948.

Airport operations were moved to the current site, Nichols Field, due to the flatter terrain, expanse of greenfield land, and the existing USAF base runway (Runway 13/31), which could be used for the airport. The original one-story bungalow terminal was built adjacent to the runway and served as Terminal 4.

=== Early operations ===
In 1954, the airport's longer international runway (Runway 06/24) and associated taxiways were built, and in 1956, construction was started on a control tower and an international terminal building. The new terminal was designed by Federico Ilustre and was built on the current site of Terminal 2. It was inaugurated on September 22, 1961.

On August 5, 1960, Pan Am inaugurated the first scheduled jet aircraft services to Manila with the arrival of a Boeing 707 from Hong Kong.

On November 1, 1968, President Ferdinand Marcos appointed former basketball player Luis A. Tabuena as general manager of the airport, with his tenure lasting up to 1986 when he was removed in the aftermath of the People Power Revolution.

On December 4, 1970, the airport welcomed its first widebody aircraft, a Boeing 747-100 of Northwest Orient Airlines.

On January 22, 1972, a fire caused substantial damage to the terminal, resulting in six casualties.

A slightly smaller terminal was built the following year. This second terminal would serve as the country's international terminal until 1981 when it was converted to a domestic terminal, upon the completion and opening of Terminal 1, a new, higher-capacity terminal. Another fire damaged the old international terminal in May 1985.

The development of the Manila International Airport, which includes Terminal 1, was approved by Executive Order No. 381 immediately after the former airport was destroyed by a fire a month earlier. The project's feasibility study and master plan were conducted by the Airways Engineering Corporation in 1973, supported by a US$29.6 million loan from the Asian Development Bank (ADB). In 1974, the designs were approved by the Philippine government and the ADB. Construction began in the second quarter of 1978 on a site close to the original Manila Airport, within the jurisdiction of Parañaque, then a municipality of Metro Manila.

On June 7, 1982, First Lady Imelda Marcos was about to leave for a 4-day diplomatic visit to China when she and President Ferdinand Marcos noticed squatter villages around the airport, upon which the president asked MIA manager Tabuena to relocate the squatters for being "an eyesore not only to tourists but also to local residents." This anti-squatter drive at the airport grew to become a nationwide program two weeks later when President Marcos declared an "all out war" against squatters by June 22.

==== Assassination of Ninoy Aquino ====
On August 21, 1983, oppositionist politician Ninoy Aquino attempted to return to the Philippines from exile in the United States, hoping to convince president Ferdinand Marcos to let go of political power after having held his position for nearly two decades. Aquino was assassinated mere moments after exiting his plane at Terminal 1's Gate 8. Aviation Security Command (AVSECOM) personnel escorted Aquino out of the plane to the tarmac, where an agency van awaited. A single gunshot was fired, identified as the one that killed him, with several more shots following, killing the alleged assassin, Rolando Galman. Seconds later, gunfire erupted, causing chaos in the plane, the tarmac, and the terminal.

The incident triggered constant protests for the next three years, and along with the crash of the Philippine economy earlier in 1983, is credited as one of the key events which led to the People Power Revolution in 1986 which removed Marcos from power.

Four years after the incident, during the presidency of Ninoy's widow Corazon Aquino in 1987, Republic Act No. 6639 was enacted without executive approval, renaming the airport in Ninoy's honor. Presently, a body mark of Aquino's assassination is on display at the departures area of Terminal 1, while the spot at Gate 8 (currently Gate 11) where he was killed has a memorial plaque. In August 2026, the body mark display was relocated to the arrivals curbside of Terminal 1.

=== Expansion and growth ===
Logo used alternatively

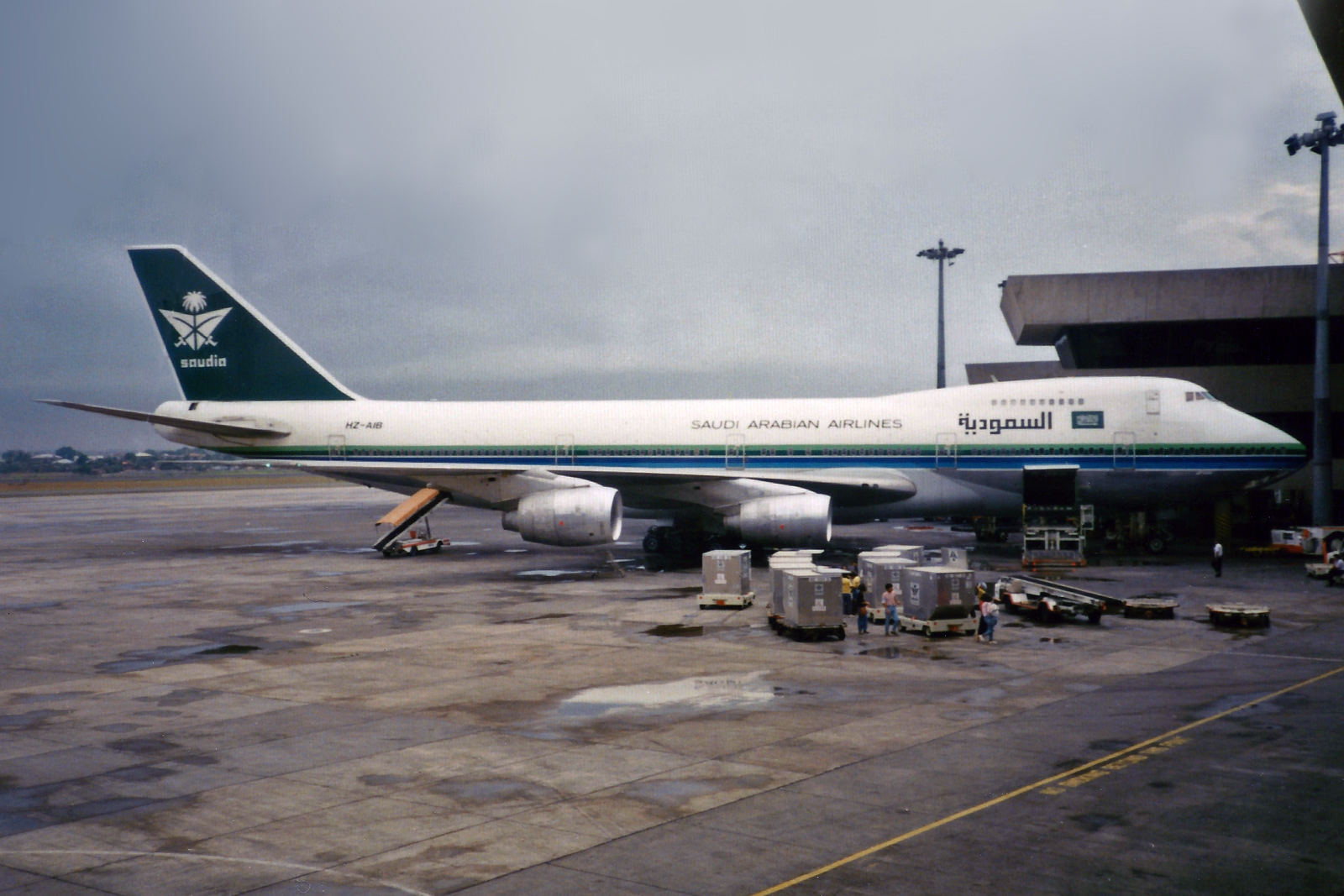
Saudia Boeing 747-100B docked at NAIA Terminal 1 in May 1989.

Plans for a new terminal were conceived in 1989 when the Department of Transportation and Communications (now Department of Transportation) commissioned the French company Aéroports de Paris to conduct a feasibility study to expand capacity, which recommended to build two new terminals.

On October 22, 1990, former manager Luis Tabuena was convicted of fraud by the Sandiganbayan for malversation of airport funds on three counts in support of President Ferdinand Marcos' corrupt practices, becoming the first major figure in the Marcos dictatorship to be convicted by the courts. However, by February 1997, his conviction would be overturned by the Supreme Court due to the Sandiganbayan justices' excessive questioning of Tabuena and defense witnesses beyond clarificatory questions that violated Tabuena's right to due process.

In 1991, the French government provided a 30-million-franc soft loan to the Philippine government to fund the detailed architectural and engineering design. ADP finished the design in 1992. The Japanese government followed suit in 1994, providing an ¥18.12-billion soft loan to the Philippine government to finance 75% of the construction costs and the entirety of the supervision costs. The construction of the terminal officially began on December 11, 1995, and the Philippine government took over the completed terminal on December 28, 1998. The terminal became fully operational on August 9, 1999.

The construction of Terminal 3 was proposed by Asia's Emerging Dragon Corporation (AEDP). AEDP eventually lost the bid to PairCargo and its partner Fraport AG of Germany. Originally scheduled to open in 2002, a contract dispute between the government of the Philippines and the project's main contractor, Philippine International Air Terminals Co. Inc. (Piatco), delayed its completion. While the original agreement allowed PairCargo and Fraport AG to operate the airport for several years after its construction, followed by a government handover, the government offered to buy out Fraport AG for US$400 million, to which Fraport agreed. However, before the terminal could be completed, President Gloria Macapagal Arroyo called the contract "onerous" and formed a committee to evaluate the buyout agreement. The contracts were declared null and void by the Supreme Court in May 2003, the Philippine government took over the terminal in December 2004. Piatco sued the Philippine government before the International Chamber of Commerce (ICC), while Fraport separately sued the government at the International Center for the Settlement of Investment Disputes (ICSID). The ICSID decided in August 2007 in favor of the government, while in January 2012, the ICC case became final and executory in favor of the government. Terminal 3 partially opened in 2008 and became fully operational in 2014, serving Cebu Pacific and most international airlines.

Passenger traffic at NAIA grew rapidly in the early 2010s, significantly outpacing the airport’s designed capacity and contributing to chronic congestion and operational issues. In 2012, NAIA handled approximately 31.88 million passengers, exceeding its optimal capacity of about 30 million passengers per year. By 2015, passenger throughput had risen further to around 36.6 million, surpassing the airport’s maximum capacity of 35 million passengers annually.

In October 2015, reports of an extortion scam concerning bullets planted by airport security officials in airline passengers' luggage, dubbed by the local media the tanim-bala [literally plant-bullet] scam) spread, causing a political controversy. Malacañang Palace and the Philippine Senate investigated the incidents. In April 2016, a similar incident occurred.

==== Terminal reassignments ====
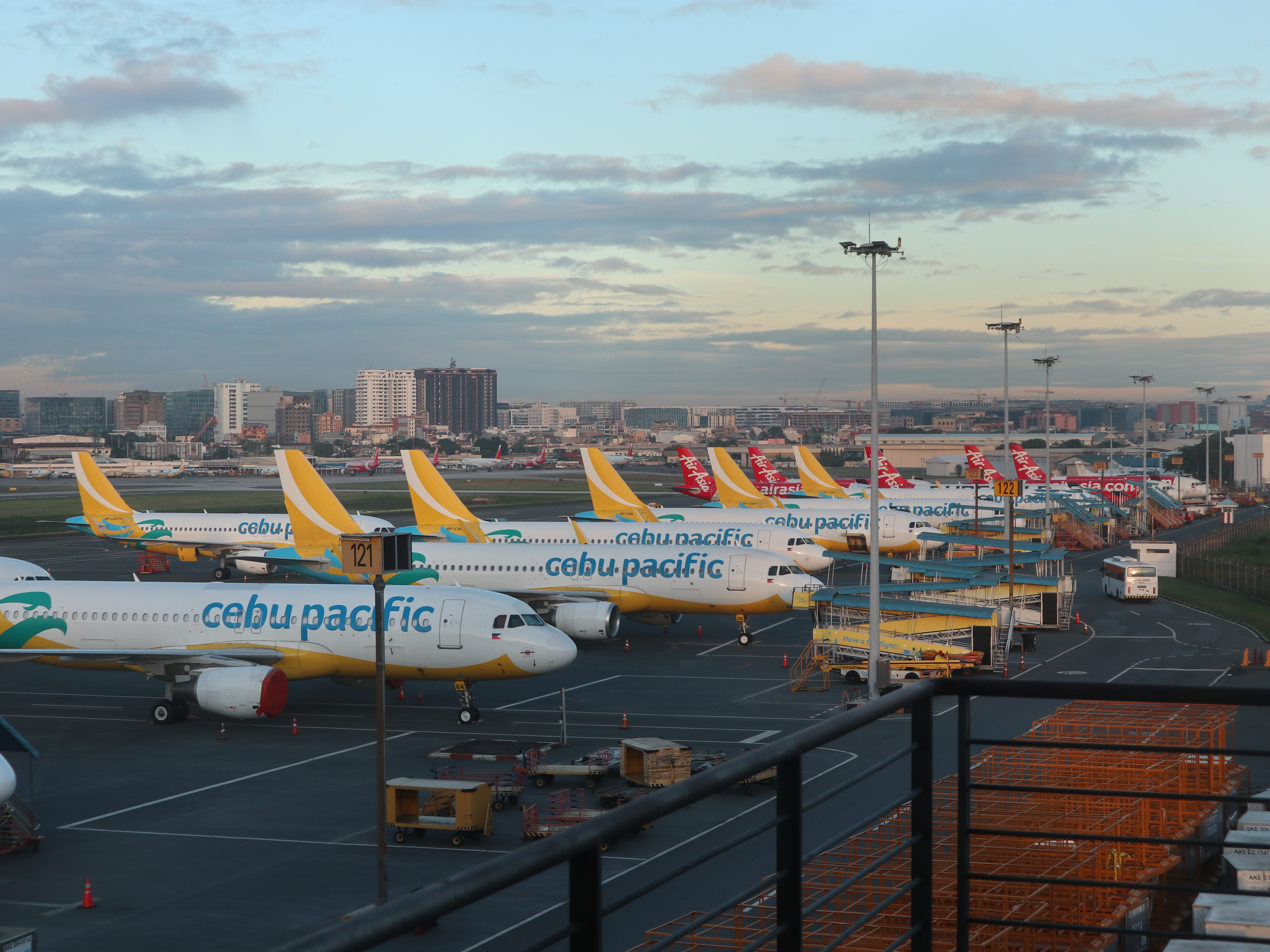
Airbus A320 family aircraft of Cebu Pacific and Philippines AirAsia at the remote gates of Terminal 3 in November 2021, two years before the rationalization of flights which relocated AirAsia's domestic flights to Terminal 2.

In February 2018, the Department of Transportation (DOTr) proposed the rationalization of flights to decongest the terminals of NAIA. The original plan called for Terminals 1 and 3 exclusively handling international flights, while Terminals 2 and 4 would facilitate domestic flights. Despite initial plans for implementation in August 2018, the MIAA announced its deferment a month prior due to "unforeseen operational constraints". The plan continued to be under review with no official implementation date set; however, some Philippine Airlines (PAL) flights to North America were relocated to Terminal 1 from Terminal 2 in July to accommodate the latter's rehabilitation. By October, four international airlines transferred operations to Terminal 3, freeing up space for United States flight operations at Terminal 1. Subsequently, more airlines from Terminal 1 were scheduled to relocate to Terminal 3.

On December 1, 2022, MIAA officially began to implement the Schedule and Terminal Assignment Rationalization (STAR) program. From April to June 2023, eight foreign airlines moved to Terminal 3. These changes were designed to offer international passengers at Terminals 1 and 3 a wider selection of food and retail outlets, and additional time for duty-free shopping. After PAL completed moving all its international flights to T1 on June 16, 2023, Philippines AirAsia and Royal Air Philippines began operating from Terminal 2 on July 1, thereby reverting the terminal to its original domestic design. While T2 is being expanded, Cebu Pacific's domestic and international operations remained at Terminal 3.

On February 24, 2026, another terminal reassignment was announced under the New NAIA Infrastructure Corporation's plans. The reassignment took place on March 29, 2026, and the selected airlines moved to their respective terminals: Air China, China Eastern Airlines, Japan Airlines, Royal Brunei Airlines, Shenzhen Airlines, and Vietnam Airlines from Terminal 1 to Terminal 3, and international flights of the AirAsia Group from Terminal 3 to Terminal 1.

==== Turboprop reassignments ====
Ahead of NAIA's privatization, in July 2024, the Philippine government reportedly planned to reassign turboprop flights in Manila to secondary airports. At the time, the government had no official policy for the transfer, but Transportation Undersecretary Timothy John Batan encouraged airlines to move its turboprop flights to Clark International Airport.

On December 3, 2024, the Manila Slot Coordination Committee (MSCC), a public-private regulatory committee which regulates NAIA's slots, issued a resolution to direct airlines to completely transfer its turboprop flights out of Manila to secondary airports by October 2025. The rationalization aims to maximize the use of airport slots in Manila, which would exclusively be dedicated to jet aircraft. It would be implemented in three phases: with the MSCC requiring scheduled domestic carriers to transfer 30% of its turboprop flights by March 2025, followed by all such flights by October, and finally, airlines with a turboprop fleet fewer than five planes would follow suit by March 2026.

The transfer also aims to maximize Clark International Airport's capacity, as it had been underserved since the opening of its expanded terminal in 2022, designed to handle eight million passengers annually. Cebgo, the turboprop subsidiary of Cebu Pacific, then announced the transfer of its Masbate and Siargao flights to Clark.

==== Attempts at privatization ====
In September 2014, the government began exploring the airport's privatization under a public–private partnership. The move was intended to improve and expand the airport. Bidding for the airport’s privatization was initially planned to commence in 2015, with the objective of completing the process and transferring operations to a private concessionaire by 2016. Several major Philippine conglomerates were reported to have expressed interest in bidding for the airport’s operations and maintenance contract, including Aboitiz, Ayala Corporation, and Megawide were reportedly interested in bidding for the airport's operations and maintenance, with the latter being the operator of the Mactan–Cebu International Airport, whose public–private partnership process was intended to serve as the model for the airport’s planned privatization.

On February 12, 2018, a consortium of seven conglomerates consisting of Aboitiz InfraCapital, AC Infrastructure Holdings (Ayala), Alliance Global, Asia's Emerging Dragon, Filinvest Development Corporation, JG Summit Holdings, and Metro Pacific Investments Corporation (which later pulled out in March 2020) submitted a ₱350 billion, or US$6.75 billion, 35-year unsolicited proposal to rehabilitate, expand, operate, and maintain the airport. The consortium's proposal was divided into two phases: the improvement and expansion of terminals in the current NAIA land area and the development of an additional runway, taxiways, passenger terminals, and associated support infrastructure. Changi Airport Consultants Pte. Ltd., was to provide technical support. Singapore's Changi Airport Group eyed a 30% stake in this venture.

On March 1, 2018, Megawide and its India-based consortium partner GMR Infrastructure submitted a ₱150 billion, or US$3 billion, proposal to decongest and redevelop the airport. GMR-Megawide did not propose a new runway, claiming that it would not significantly boost capacity.

On July 7, 2020, the NAIA consortium's proposal was rejected by the government, allowing GMR-Megawide to take over the project. On December 15, however, MIAA revoked the original proponent status (OPS) of GMR-Megawide, who then filed a motion for reconsideration. The MIAA denied the motion for reconsideration. In August 2022, the Department of Transportation (DOTr) announced plans to rebid the public–private partnership project within the year.

=== Privatization and rehabilitation ===
Following a major airspace closure on January 1, 2023, plans to privatize the airport were pitched again. Finance Secretary Benjamin Diokno supported such plans, but maintained that it should be "thoroughly studied". On April 27, the Manila International Airport Consortium (MIAC), composed of six organizations (Alliance Global, AC Infrastructure Holdings under Ayala Corporation, Infracorp Development, Filinvest Development Corporation, and JG Summit Infrastructure Holdings) submitted a ₱100 billion 25-year unsolicited proposal to rehabilitate the airport. This proposal was subsequently rejected by the administration of President Bongbong Marcos on July 19, which opted to go through solicited bidding instead.

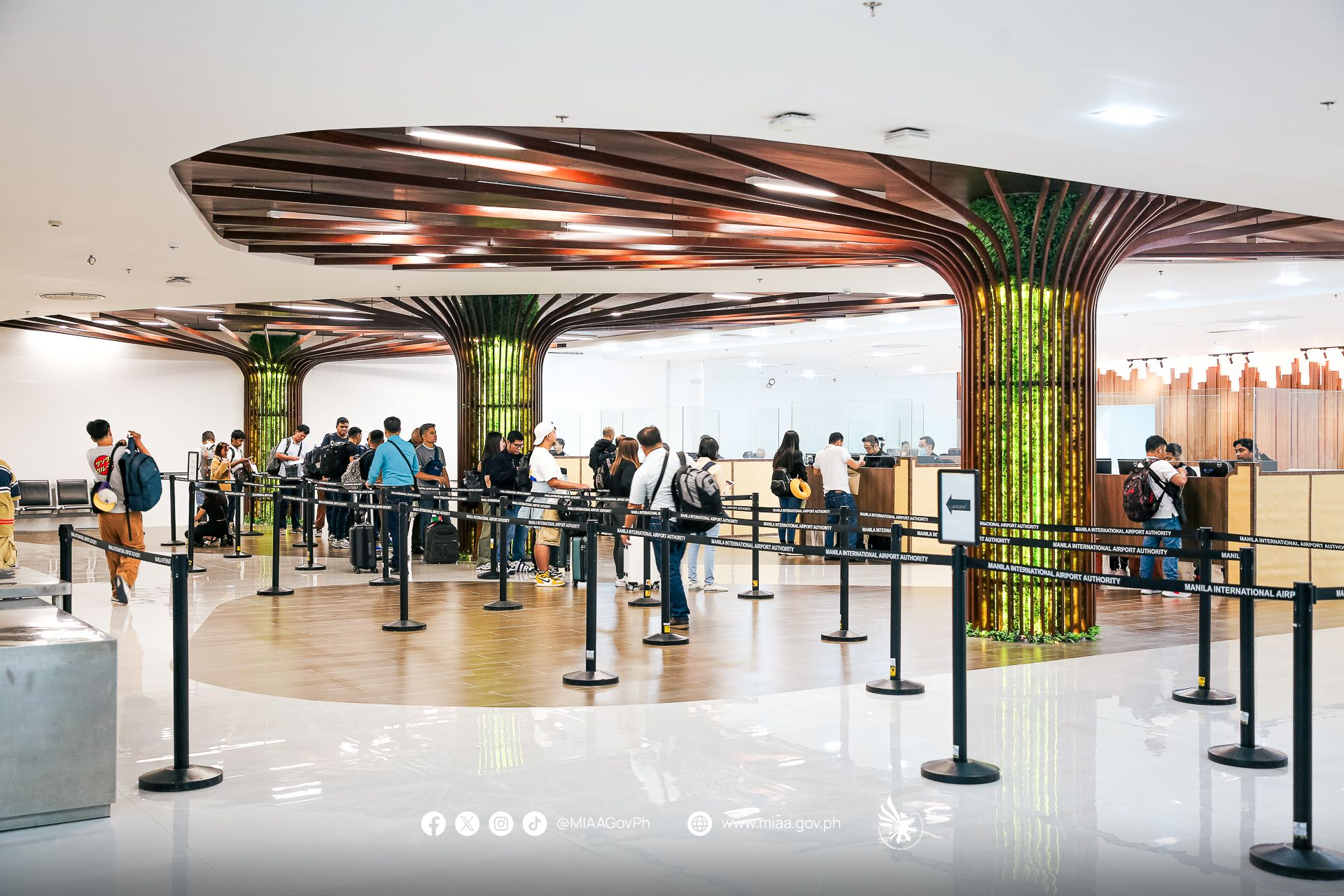
As part of its rehabilitation, Terminal 3 added a dedicated immigration hall for Overseas Filipino Workers (OFWs) in 2025

The solicited concession agreement is set for fifteen years, with a ten-year extension if needed in case the opening of New Manila International Airport (NMIA) in Bulacan and Sangley Point Airport in Cavite would be delayed. The bidding opened on August 23, 2023. Four consortia submitted bids on the December 27 deadline: MIAC, Asian Airports Consortium (consisting of Lucio Co's Cosco Capital, Inc.; Asian Infrastructure and Management Corp., Philippine Skylanders International, Inc., and PT Angkasa Pura II), GMR Airports Consortium, and SMC SAP & Co. Consortium, a consortium led by San Miguel Corporation (SMC) and Incheon International Airport Corporation—the operator of Incheon International Airport in South Korea, with RMM Asian Logistics Inc. and RLW Aviation Development Inc. The Asian Airports Consortium was disqualified in the bidding after it was deemed non-compliant.

On February 16, 2024, the DOTr awarded the contract to SMC SAP & Co. Consortium, later renamed as New NAIA Infrastructure Corporation (NNIC). the contract was signed on March 18, witnessed by President Marcos. NNIC offered the biggest revenue share with the government at 82.16%, more than double the proposed revenue shares of GMR Airports Consortium (33.30%) and MIAC (25.91%). The consortium also made the initial ₱30 billion payment to the government. With the privatization, the national government is expected to earn ₱900 billion, or ₱36 billion annually. On September 14, 2024, the MIAA turned over the operations and maintenance of the airport to NNIC. The operator's parent company, which is also constructing NMIA in Bulacan, decided to prioritize the rehabilitation of NAIA.

The turnover was followed by a series of airport fee hikes. On October 1, NNIC increased parking fees. The overnight parking fees, which quadrupled from ₱300 to ₱1,200, drew criticism from motorists; however, both NNIC and the DOTr defended the move, as it is designed to deter the misuse of parking slots. According to NNIC, previous parking rates were used by non-passengers, which contributed to congestion. Nevertheless, NNIC is developing a 4-hectare (9.9-acre) area near Terminal 3 for a 2,500-slot parking space. On the same day, it increased takeoff and landing fees, causing Philippine Airlines, Cebu Pacific, and Philippines AirAsia to propose a "terminal enhancement fee" to cover the higher fees, pending approval of the Civil Aeronautics Board. Additionally, passenger service charges — also known as "terminal fees" — increased exactly one year after the private consortium's takeover, mainly to fund renovations and improvements at existing terminals.

== Terminals ==
Ninoy Aquino International Airport has three passenger terminals, with plans to build another two.

Passenger terminal infrastructure
Terminal	Opened	Floor area	Handling capacity	Parking bays
Terminal 1	March 4, 1982	73,000 m^{2} (790,000 sq ft)	6 million passengers per year	16 (aerobridge); 5 (remote)
Terminal 2	September 1999	77,800 m^{2} (837,000 sq ft)	10 million passengers per year	12 (aerobridge); 13 (remote)
Terminal 3	July 22, 2008	182,500 m^{2} (1,964,000 sq ft)	13 million passengers per year	20 (aerobridge); 11 (remote)
Total	—N/a	333,300 m^{2} (3,588,000 sq ft)	29 million passengers per year	46 (aerobridge); 43 (remote)

=== Terminal 1 ===
View of Terminal 1 from the taxiway

Covering 73,000 square meters (790,000 sq ft), Terminal 1 of the Ninoy Aquino International Airport was designed to handle six million passengers annually. It is often referred to as the Ninoy Aquino Terminal, as it was the site of the former senator's assassination in 1983. The terminal, opened in 1982, is the airport's second oldest and exclusively handles international flights.

The terminal's detailed engineering design was created by Renardet-Sauti/Transplan/F.F. Cruz Consultant, and the architectural design was developed by Leandro Locsin's L.V. Locsin and Associates.

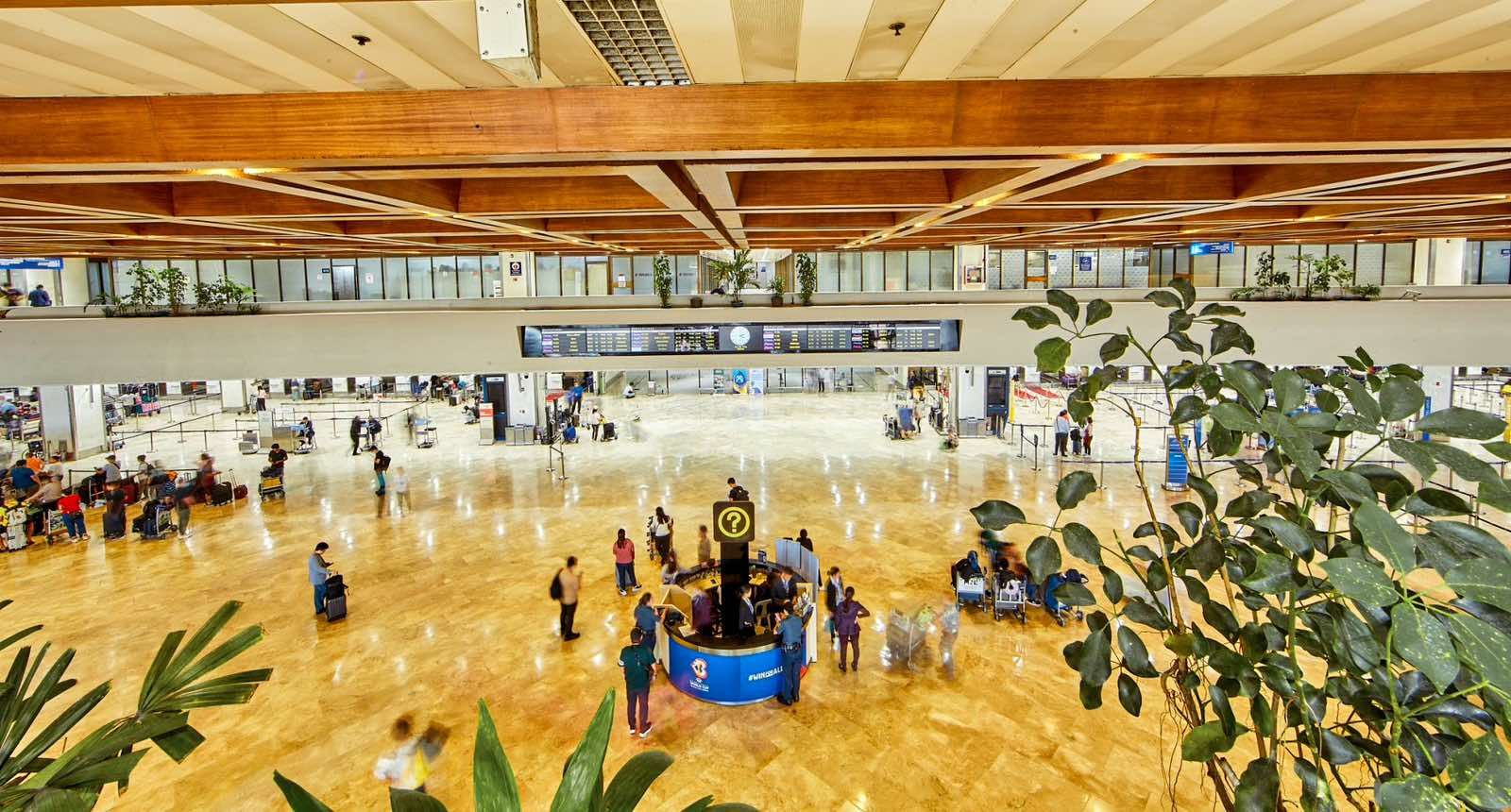
Terminal 1 departure hall

By 1991, Terminal 1 reached its capacity with a total passenger volume of 4.53 million. From that year, the terminal has been over capacity, recording an annual average growth rate of 11%. To accommodate this, improvements have been made, increasing its capacity to six million passengers. In the same year, an extension arrival area was constructed at the ground level to decongest the terminal's original arrivals area. The main arrivals curbside was later designated for VIPs and passengers with special requests until 2025, where it was reopened to all passengers.

From 2011 to 2013, Terminal 1 was ranked among the worst airports in Asia by the travel website The Guide to Sleeping In Airports. As a result, plans were developed to rehabilitate the terminal, expanding the arrival area, adding parking spaces, and enhancing facilities. Renovations began on January 23, 2014, which involved the installation of buckling restrained braces to enhance the building's structural integrity.

Terminal 1 once served almost all foreign-based carriers. After the larger Terminal 3 was fully completed in 2014, 23 airlines moved there to decongest Terminal 1. Since June 16, 2023, flag carrier Philippine Airlines has used Terminal 1 as its international hub; the AirAsia Group followed suit on March 29, 2026. Other airlines operating at Terminal 1 include Air India, Air Niugini, Asiana Airlines, China Airlines, EVA Air, Hunnu Air, Korean Air, Kuwait Airways, Malaysia Airlines, Oman Air, Saudia, VietJet Air, and XiamenAir.

=== Terminal 2 ===
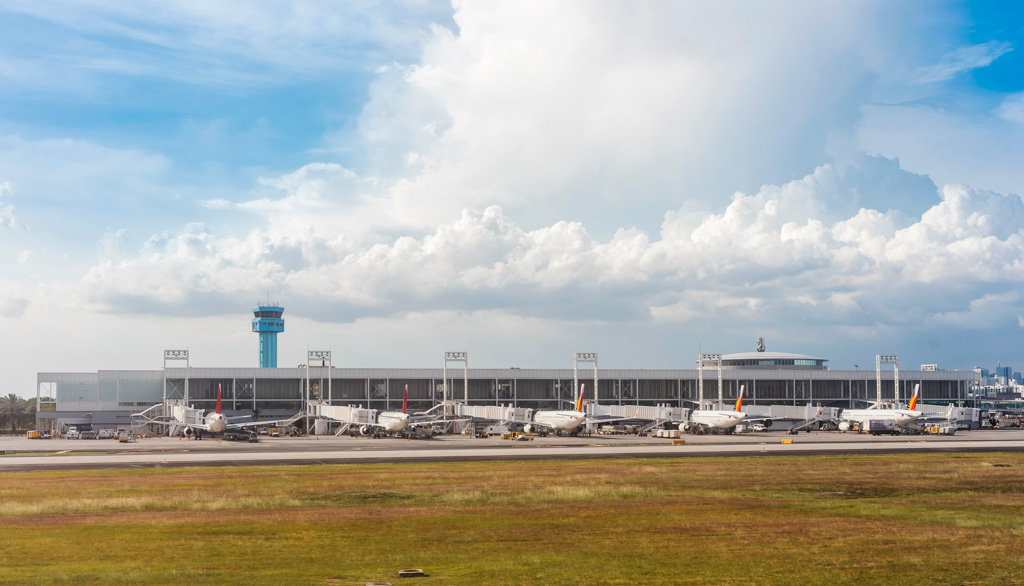
Terminal 2 south wing

Terminal 2, situated at the end of the old MIA Road (now NAIA Road), covers an area of 75,000 square meters (810,000 sq ft). It occupies the land where the 1961–1972 terminal stood. Construction began in December 1995, and the terminal started operating in 1999. It received the name Centennial Terminal in commemoration of the centennial year of Philippine independence. French company Aéroports de Paris (ADP) initially designed the terminal for domestic use, but later modified the design to accommodate international flights. With 12 jet bridges, the terminal can accommodate 2.5 million passengers per year in its north wing and five million in its south wing, for a total of 7.5 million passengers per year. After its conversion to a domestic terminal in 2023, its capacity was increased to ten million.

The airport's control tower in front of Terminal 2

In August 2014, authorities announced a plan to expand Terminal 2, incorporating a structure to interconnect Terminals 1 and 2. In order to do so, the plan called for demolishing the adjacent unused Philippine Village Hotel complex and relocating a fuel depot, as well as the international cargo complex. Rehabilitation of the terminal began in September 2018, and by February 16, 2021, the partially expanded Terminal 2 was inaugurated, adding 2,800 square meters (30,000 sq ft) to the terminal area. However, Terminal 2 has not been interconnected with Terminal 1 yet, nor have the adjacent complexes been demolished. In 2024, the New NAIA Infrastructure Corporation (NNIC) announced that it will interconnect the two terminals after demolishing the hotel and relocating the fuel farm and the cargo terminal as part of its rehabilitation plan. This plan will increase the terminal's capacity by about 23 million passengers.

From 1999 to 2023, flag carrier Philippine Airlines and its domestic subsidiary PAL Express exclusively used Terminal 2. It facilitated both domestic and international flights for these airlines, notwithstanding the operation of select PAL Express flights from Terminal 3 from 2012 to 2018. On June 16, 2023, PAL moved its international flights to Terminal 1, leaving its domestic flights at Terminal 2. This allowed the entry of low-cost carriers and former Terminal 4 users Philippines AirAsia and Royal Air Philippines on July 1, thereby converting T2 to exclusively serve domestic flights.

=== Terminal 3 ===
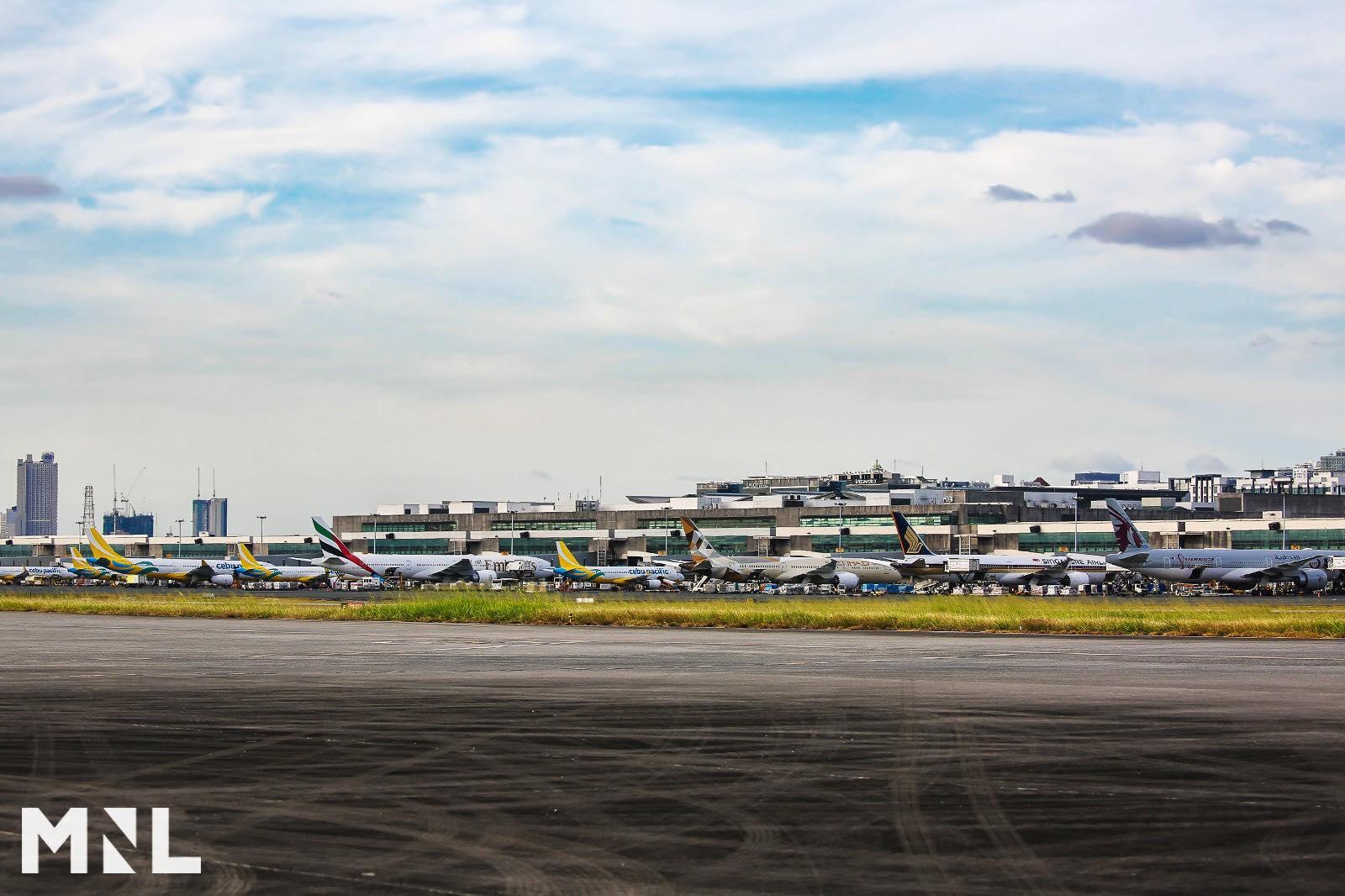
View of Terminal 3 from Terminal 2

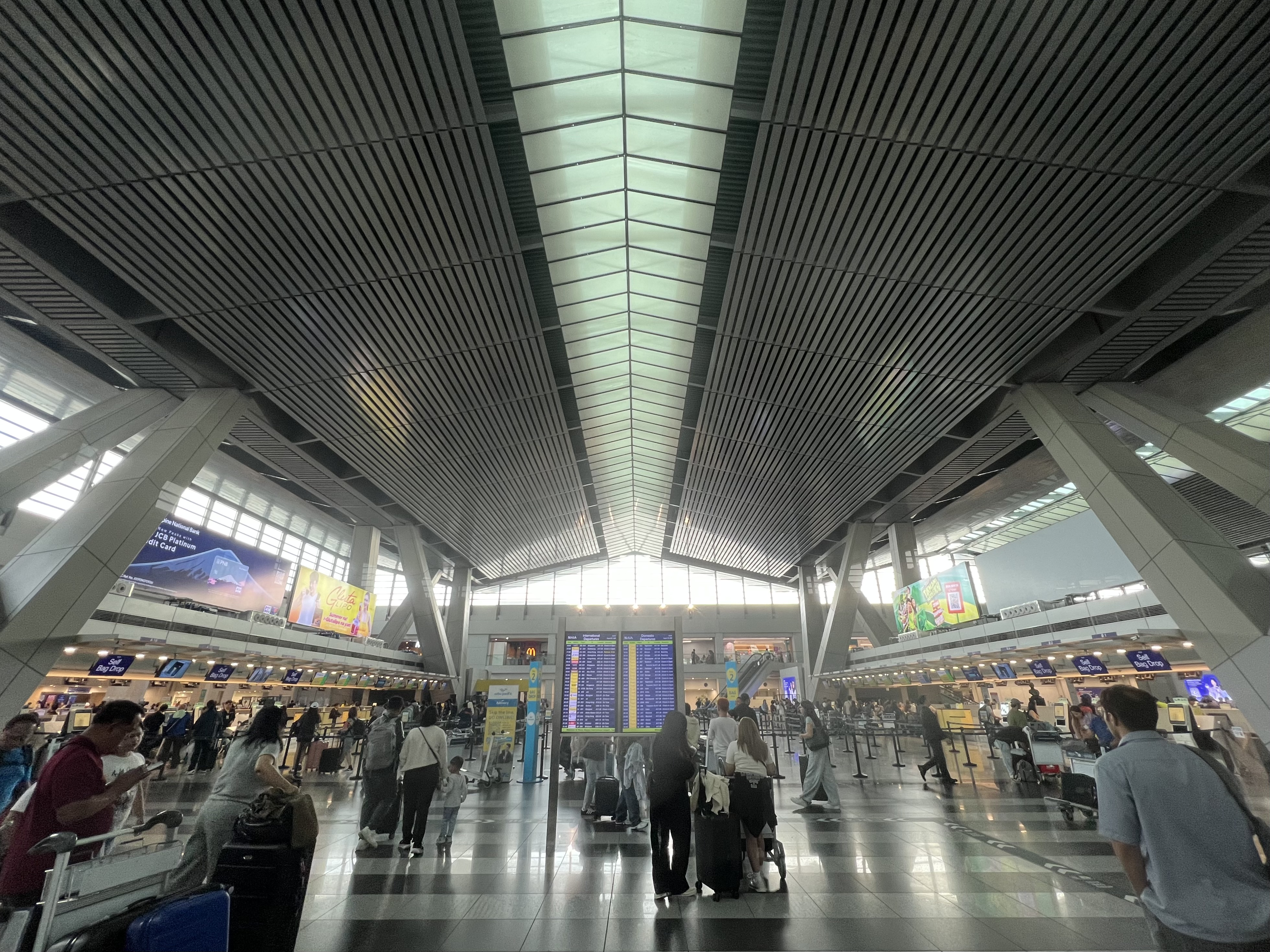
Departure area of Terminal 3

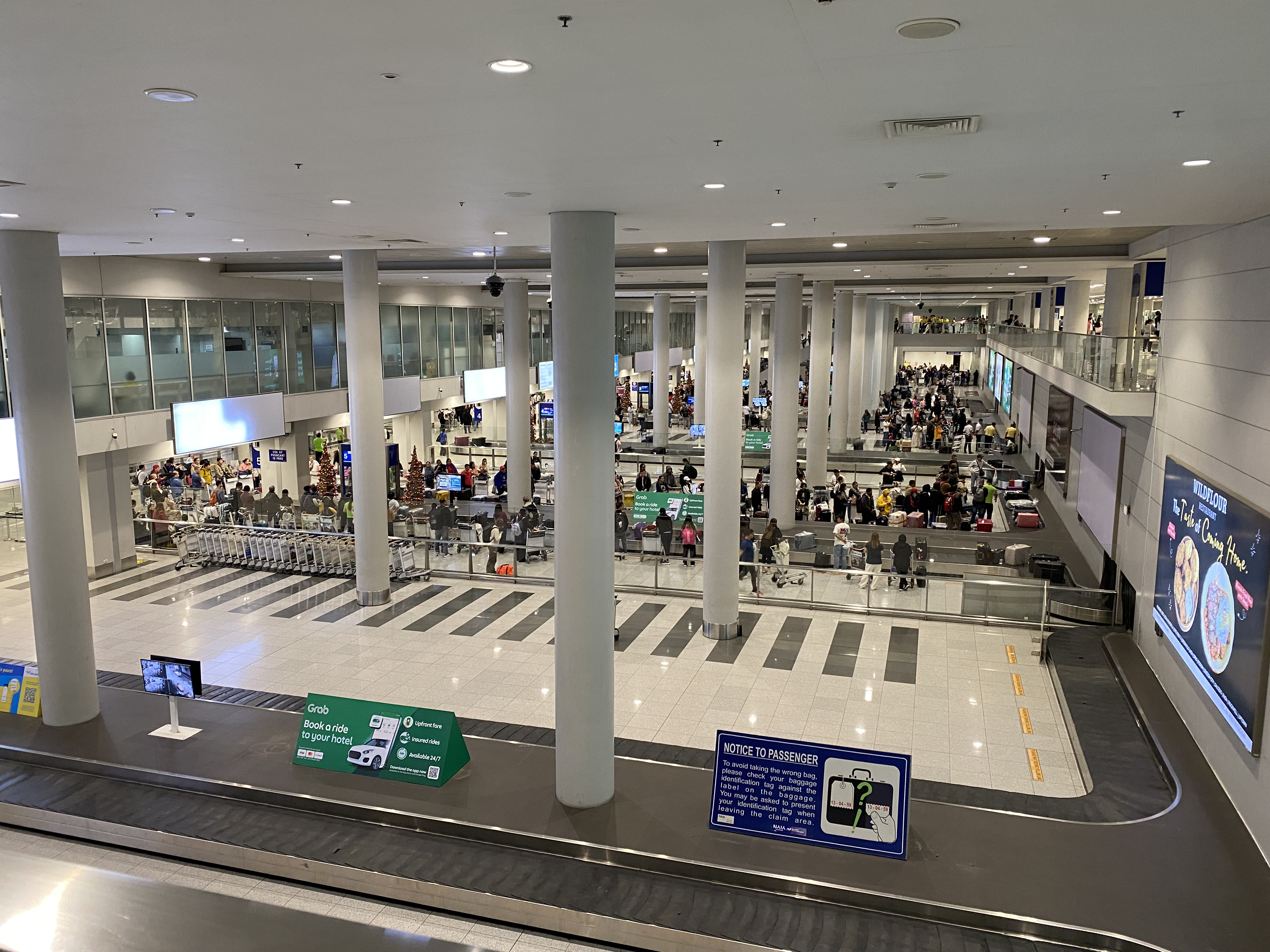
Baggage reclaim area of Terminal 3

Terminal 3, the newest and largest terminal, covers 182,500 square meters (1,964,000 sq ft) and extends 1.2 kilometers (0.75 mi), occupying a 63.5-hectare (157-acre) Bases Conversion and Development Authority (BCDA)-owned site on Villamor Air Base. With construction beginning in 1997, the terminal partially opened on July 22, 2008, increasing the airport's capacity by 13 million passengers. The terminal's development, part of the 1989 expansion plan, commenced in 1997 but was beleaguered by legal battles, red tape, and arbitration cases in the United States and Singapore, as well as technical and safety issues including repeated incidents of collapsed ceilings that led to repeated delays. Japan-based Takenaka Corporation undertook the terminal's rehabilitation, and it became fully operational on July 31, 2014.

Skidmore, Owings and Merrill (SOM) designed the US$640 million terminal, which has 20 jet bridges and four remote gates served by apron buses. The terminal's apron area spans 147,400 square meters (1,587,000 sq ft) and can service up to 32 aircraft simultaneously. It has the capacity to serve 33,000 passengers per day or 6,000 per hour. Since April 2017, a 220-meter (720 ft) long indoor footbridge called Runway Manila has been connecting the terminal to Newport City.

After the airport's privatization, the terminal was rehabilitated again, with new passenger amenities being opened gradually, including a dedicated lounge for Overseas Filipino Workers that opened in July 2024.

Low-cost carrier Cebu Pacific was the first to operate at Terminal 3 on July 22, 2008. PAL Express (then Air Philippines and Airphil Express) followed suit, and used it until 2018. The first foreign carrier to operate out of Terminal 3 was All Nippon Airways on February 27, 2011. Following the terminal's full completion in 2014, Delta Air Lines, KLM, Emirates, Singapore Airlines, and Cathay Pacific moved to Terminal 3 from Terminal 1. Other airlines followed suit between 2018 and 2020: United Airlines, Qantas, Qatar Airways, Turkish Airlines, and Etihad Airways; as did the Jetstar Group, Scoot, China Southern Airlines, Starlux Airlines, Jeju Air, Ethiopian Airlines, Thai Airways International, and Gulf Air in 2023; as well as Air China, China Eastern Airlines, Japan Airlines, Royal Brunei Airlines, Shenzhen Airlines, and Vietnam Airlines in 2026. The AirAsia Group was a former user of the terminal for its international flights from September 15, 2014, until its transfer to Terminal 1 on March 29, 2026. Other operators at Terminal 3 include newer entrants Air Canada, Air France, Greater Bay Airlines, HK Express and Riyadh Air.

On June 12, 2026, the MIAA was reported to have struck a deal with the BCDA to buy the land where the terminal stands on.

=== Terminal 4 ===
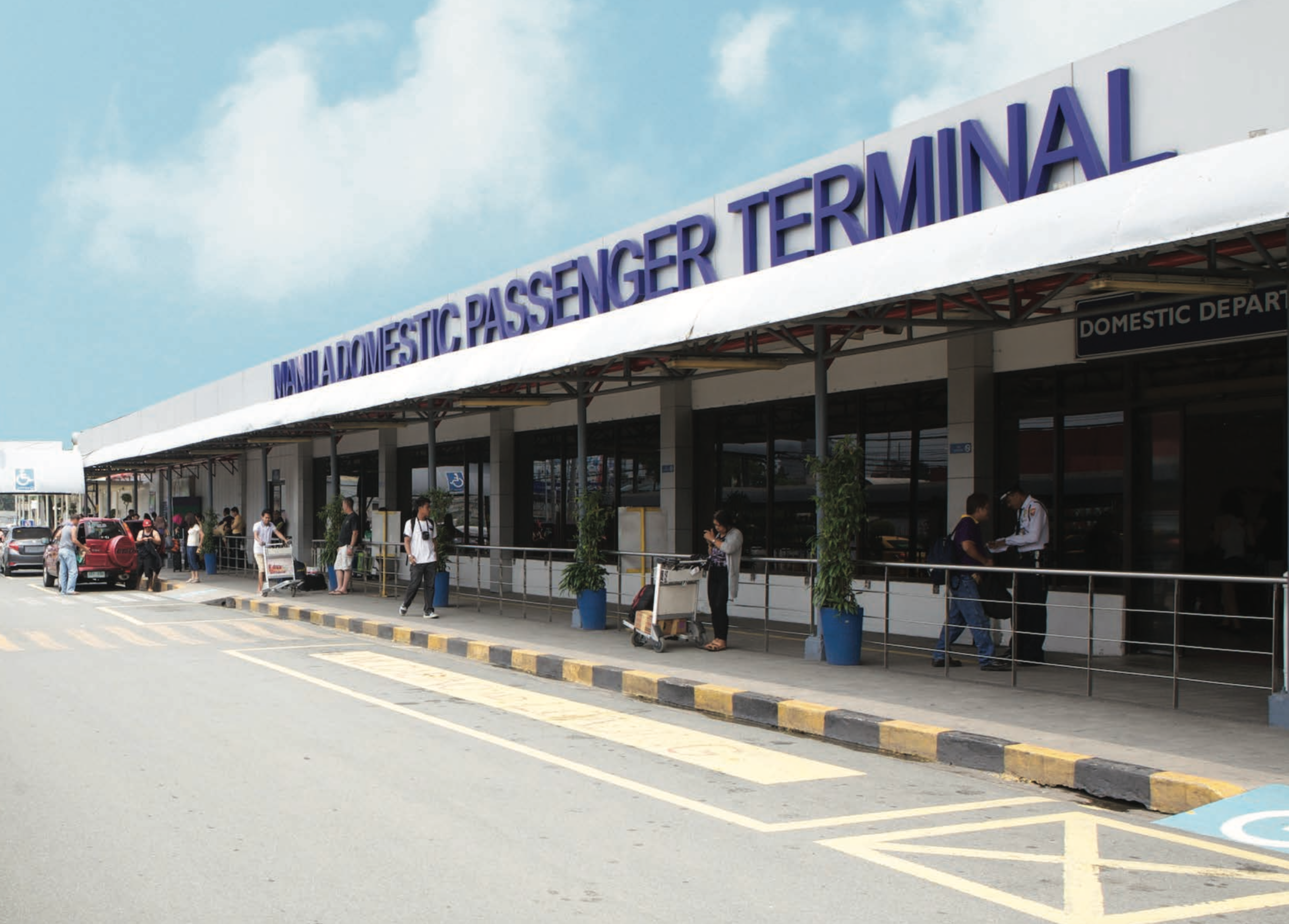
Exterior of the original Terminal 4's landside portion

Constructed in 1948, the old Terminal 4, also known as the Manila Domestic Passenger Terminal or the Old Domestic Terminal, was the first and original structure of the airport, as well as its oldest and smallest terminal. Positioned on the old Airport Road, the Domestic Terminal was located near the north end of Runway 13/31. It accommodated up to three million passengers annually until its closure.

Philippines AirAsia was a primary user of Terminal 4 from 2013 to 2023. In December 2022, to decongest the terminal, it transferred its two busiest flights—to Cebu and Caticlan—to Terminal 3, while all other domestic flights remained at T4. It continued to operate under this scheme until all flights were transferred to Terminal 2 on July 1, 2023. With that, the original T4 had been specifically assigned for turboprop aircraft, functioning exclusively with ground-loaded gates, primarily hosting domestic flights by regional airlines such as AirSWIFT, SkyJet Airlines, Cebgo, and Sunlight Air.

In response to the COVID-19 pandemic, the airport authority closed Terminal 4 to minimize operating costs, while the remaining three terminals resumed operations in June 2020 upon the lifting of the enhanced community quarantine in Luzon. During its temporary closure, the terminal was utilized as a vaccination site for airport employees. As such, AirAsia temporarily transferred its domestic operations to Terminal 3. After a two-year hiatus, Terminal 4 reopened on March 28, 2022.

Under NNIC's management, the old Terminal 4 closed on November 6, 2024, to make way for major renovations scheduled until February 2025. As such, AirSWIFT, Cebgo, and Sunlight Air relocated to Terminal 2. However, NNIC halted its renovation on the terminal, identifying the structure as a safety hazard. The terminal began to be demolished in late February 2025 as part of a broader land optimization plan to create space for a new taxiway that will enhance aircraft movement between Terminals 1, 2, and 3. Under NNIC's management, a new Terminal 4 was to be built at the International Cargo Terminal building. In August 2026, NNIC canceled its plans to reconstruct Terminal 4, prioritizing the construction of Terminal 5 instead.

=== Terminal 5 ===
Under NNIC's management, Terminal 5 will be built next to Terminal 2. The Philippine Village Hotel and the old Nayong Pilipino complex have been demolished for the construction of Terminal 5. Terminal 5 is expected to be completed by 2029.

== Infrastructure and facilities ==
=== Runways ===
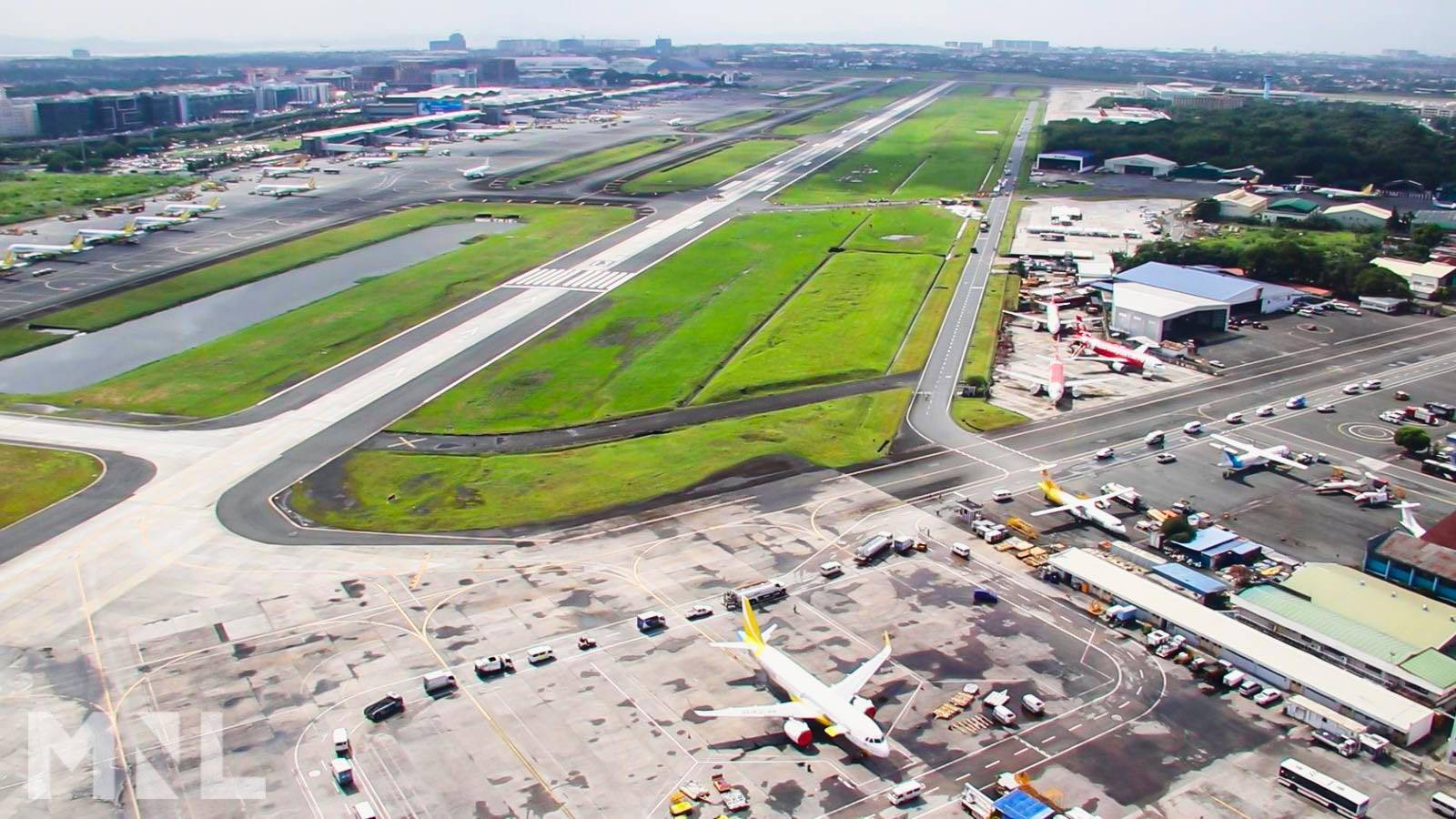
Aerial view of Runway 13/31 from above the original Terminal 4

NAIA's primary runway is 3,514 meters (11,529 ft) long and 60 meters (200 ft) wide, running in a northeast–southwest direction at a true bearing of 060.3°/240.3° (designated as Runway 06/24). Its secondary runway is 2,249 meters (7,379 ft) long and 45 meters (148 ft) wide, running in a southeast–northwest direction at a true bearing of 134.8°/314.8° (designated as Runway 13/31). The primary runway was oriented at 06/24 to harness the southeast and southwest winds. In other words, the primary runway is oriented to utilize the northeast monsoon (Amihan) winds (roughly from November to April) and the southwest monsoon (Habagat) winds (from May to October). Of the 550 daily flights, 100 take the secondary runway. It mainly caters to private planes and narrowbody aircraft such as the ATR 72-500, Airbus A320, and Airbus A321, and was the main runway of the original Terminal 4.

Runway 13/31 closed in 2020 for rehabilitation. The runway was reopened on February 16, 2021, along with a newly constructed taxiway.

In 2014, Transportation and Communications Secretary Joseph Abaya proposed a new runway adjacent to the existing Runway 06/24. The proposed runway has a length of 2,100 meters (6,900 ft) that could allow the landing of an Airbus A320 and increase capacity from 40 planes per hour to 60–70. A Dutch consultant hired by the government also suggested to build another terminal to cause less disruptions to the general public.

The Japan International Cooperation Agency previously proposed Sangley Point in Cavite as the site of an international airport serving the Greater Manila Area under an "integrated airspace" with NAIA and serve as its third runway until Sangley is further expanded in the long term.

=== NAIA Road ===
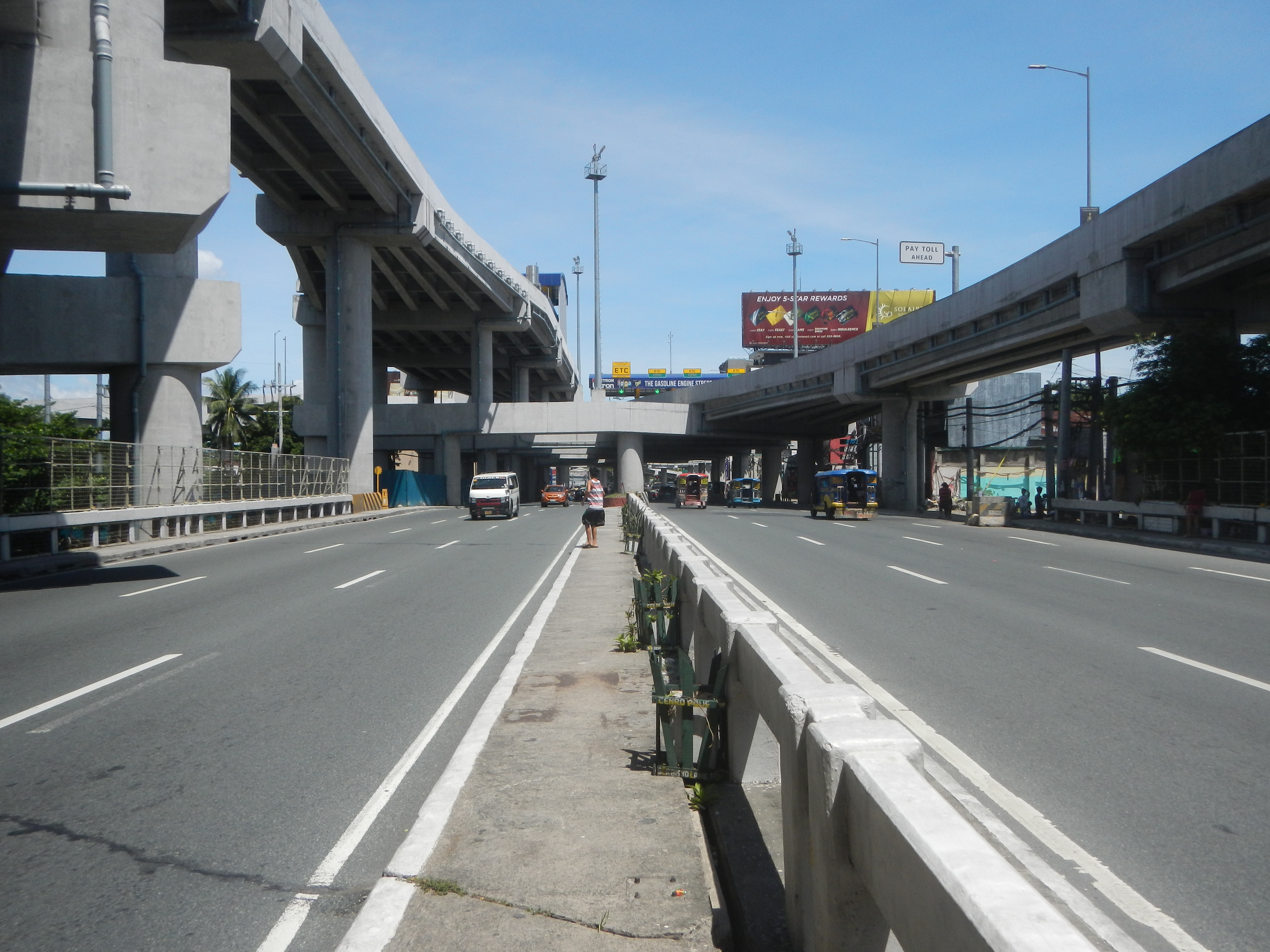
NAIA road

NAIA Road (Ninoy Aquino International Airport Road), formerly known and still commonly referred to as MIA Road (Manila International Airport Road), is a short 8-10 lane divided highway connecting Roxas Boulevard and the Manila–Cavite Expressway (R-1) with NAIA. It is also a major local road that links the cities of Parañaque and Pasay, running approximately 2.5 kilometers (1.6 mi) underneath the elevated NAIA Expressway from R-1 in Tambo, Parañaque, to NAIA Terminal 2 in Pasay. En route, it intersects, from west to east, Quirino Avenue (in Parañaque, distinct from that in the City of Manila), Domestic Road, and Ninoy Aquino Avenue. The road ends at the entrance of NAIA Terminal 2.

The road also houses a small strip of shops across from the former Coastal Mall, Tambo Elementary School at Quirino Avenue, Park 'N Fly at Domestic Road, and the old Nayong Pilipino (site of the future NAIA Terminal 5) close to Terminal 2. The old NAIA Terminal 1 is accessible by turning south at Ninoy Aquino Avenue, which also leads to the Duty Free FiestaMall and continues on to Sucat as Dr. Santos Avenue. The new Terminal 3, on the other hand, is located on Andrews Avenue, which can be accessed from Domestic Road. The road was originally named MIA Road and was only renamed in 1987 when the airport was renamed in honor of Senator Ninoy Aquino, who was assassinated there in 1983.

=== Maintenance ===
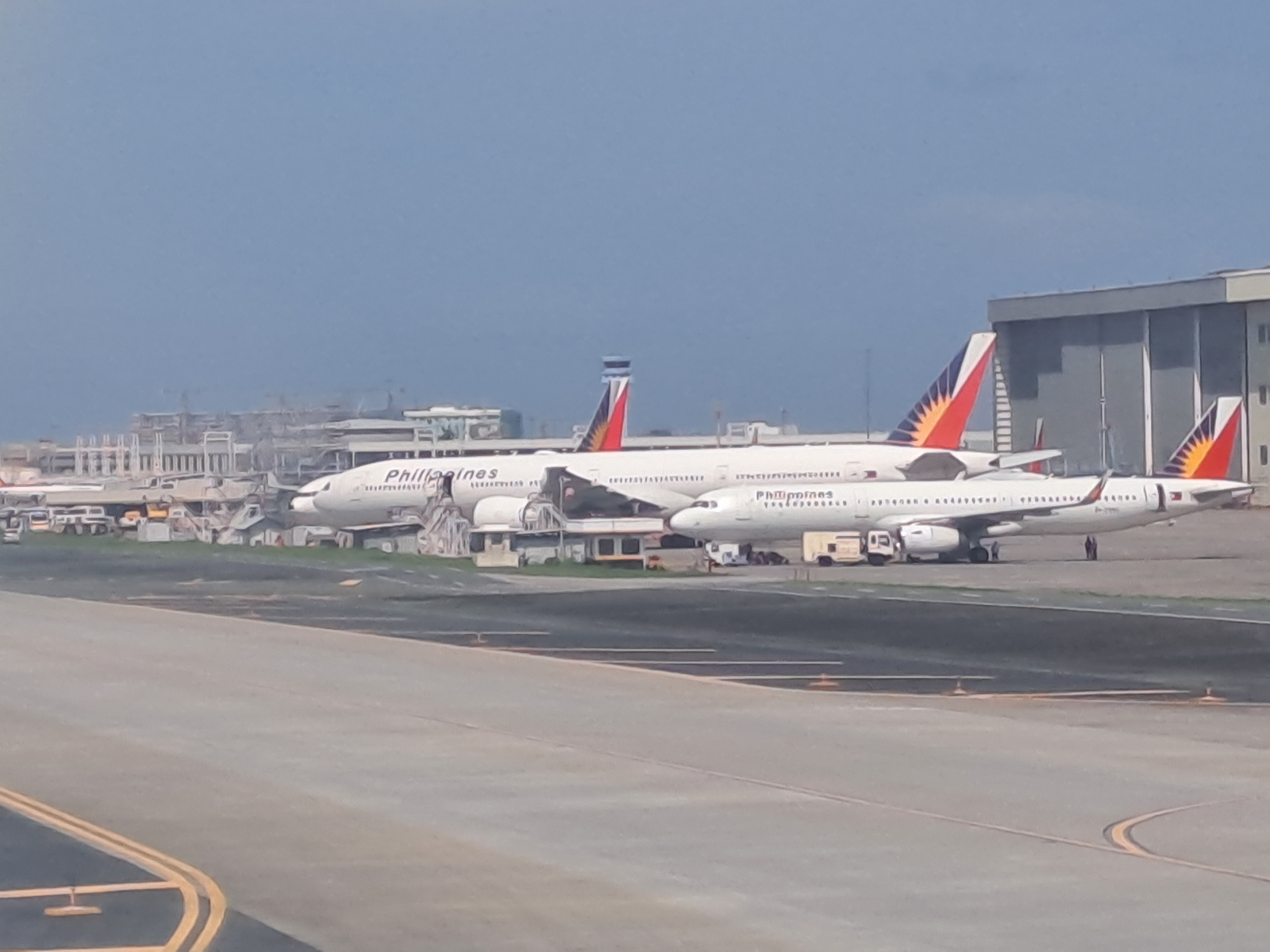
Aircraft of Philippine Airlines parked next to the maintenance hangars of Lufthansa Technik Philippines

Lufthansa Technik Philippines (LTP) (formerly PAL Technical Center) was founded in 2000 as a joint venture of German firm Lufthansa Technik (51%) and Philippine aviation service provider MacroAsia Corporation (49%). Lufthansa Technik Philippines offers customers aircraft maintenance, repair, and overhaul (MRO) services.

The company performs maintenance checks for the Airbus A320 family and A330/A340 aircraft. Seven hangar bays and workshops provide industry standard maintenance, major modifications, cabin reconfigurations, engine maintenance, and painting for the A320 family, A330/A340, as well as the Boeing 747-400 and 777 aircraft. A new widebody hangar was recently added to meet the increasing demand for A330/A340 maintenance.

The company also opened an Airbus A380 maintenance hangar to allow the aircraft to be repaired at the airport facility. It also provides technical and engineering support for the entire Philippine Airlines fleet and other international airline fleets.

Aviation Partnership (Philippines) Corporation is Cebu Pacific third-line maintenance. It was a former joint venture of SIA Engineering Company (51%) and Cebu Pacific Air (49%) until November 2020 when Cebu Pacific decide to take 100% ownership of the company. It provides line maintenance, light aircraft checks, technical ramp handling, and other services to Cebu Pacific and third-party airline customers.

=== Training ===
Philippine Airlines (PAL) operates the PAL Learning Center within the airport's premises. The center includes training facilities for pilots and cabin crew, catering services, a data center, and an Airbus A320 flight simulator.

=== DHL ===
The airport is a gateway facility for DHL. On March 12, 2006, the company opened its first quality control center.

== Airlines and destinations ==
=== Key destinations ===
In 2024, the International Air Transport Association reported that the Manila–Cebu corridor was the busiest passenger flight route from Manila and the eighth-busiest in the world by total passenger traffic. Cebu was also the most frequently served destination from Manila in terms of flight frequency, followed by Caticlan, Iloilo, Davao, Cagayan de Oro, and Bacolod.

In summer 2025, OAG reported that Manila–Singapore was the sixth-busiest international passenger flight route in Southeast Asia and the busiest international route from Manila, with 1,459,007 seats available that year. In terms of flight frequency, however, Hong Kong was the most served international destination from NAIA, followed by Singapore, Taipei, Seoul, Tokyo (Narita), and Kuala Lumpur.

=== Passenger ===
Airlines	Destinations
Air Canada	Vancouver
Air Changan	Charter: Yichang
Air China	Beijing–Capital, Chengdu–Tianfu, Chongqing
Air France	Seasonal: Paris–Charles de Gaulle
Air India	Delhi–Indira Gandhi
Air Macau	Macau
Air Niugini	Port Moresby
AirAsia	Kuala Lumpur–International
All Nippon Airways	Tokyo–Haneda, Tokyo–Narita
Arkia	Seasonal: Tel Aviv (begins January 4, 2027)
Asiana Airlines	Seoul–Incheon (ends December 17, 2026)
Bamboo Airways	Charter: Da Nang
Cathay Pacific	Hong Kong
Cebu Pacific	Bacolod, Bandar Seri Begawan, Bangkok–Don Mueang, Bangkok–Suvarnabhumi, Butuan, Cagayan de Oro, Caticlan, Cauayan, Cebu, Da Nang, Davao, Denpasar, Dipolog, Dubai–International, Dumaguete, Fukuoka, General Santos, Guangzhou, Hanoi, Ho Chi Minh City, Hong Kong, Iloilo, Jakarta–Soekarno-Hatta, Kalibo, Kaohsiung, Kuala Lumpur–International, Laoag, Legazpi, Macau, Melbourne, Nagoya–Centrair, Osaka–Kansai, Ozamiz, Pagadian, Puerto Princesa, Riyadh, Roxas, Sapporo–Chitose, Seoul–Incheon, Shanghai–Pudong, Singapore, Sydney–Kingsford Smith, Tacloban, Tagbilaran, Taipei–Taoyuan, Tokyo–Narita, Tuguegarao, Virac, Zamboanga
China Airlines	Kaohsiung, Taipei–Taoyuan
China Eastern Airlines	Shanghai–Pudong
China Southern Airlines	Guangzhou
Delta Air Lines	Los Angeles (begins March 30, 2027)
Emirates	Dubai–International
Ethiopian Airlines	Addis Ababa (Note: Ethiopian Airlines flights make an intermediate stop in Hong Kong en route to the listed destination. However, the airline has no fifth freedom rights to carry passengers solely between Manila and Hong Kong.)
Etihad Airways	Abu Dhabi
EVA Air	Taipei–Taoyuan
Greater Bay Airlines	Hong Kong
Gulf Air	Bahrain, Dammam
HK Express	Hong Kong
Hunnu Air	Seasonal charter: Ulaanbaatar
Japan Airlines	Tokyo–Haneda, Tokyo–Narita
Jeju Air	Busan (begins December 18, 2026), Seoul–Incheon
Jetstar	Perth
Jetstar Japan	Osaka–Kansai, Tokyo–Narita
Juneyao Air	Shanghai–Pudong
KLM	Amsterdam (Note: KLM flights make an intermediate stop in Taipei en route to the listed destination. However, the airline has no fifth freedom rights to carry passengers solely between Manila and Taipei.)
Korean Air	Seoul–Incheon
Kuwait Airways	Dammam, Kuwait City
Malaysia Airlines	Kuala Lumpur–International
Oman Air	Muscat
PAL Express	Bacolod, Butuan, Cagayan de Oro, Caticlan, Cebu, Cotabato, Cauayan, Davao, Dipolog, Dumaguete, General Santos, Iloilo, Laoag, Legazpi, Ozamiz, Phnom Penh, Puerto Princesa, Roxas, Saipan, Tacloban, Tagbilaran, Tuguegarao, Zamboanga
Philippine Airlines	Bangkok–Suvarnabhumi, Beijing–Capital, Brisbane, Busan, Cagayan de Oro, Cebu, Chicago–O'Hare, Da Nang, Davao, Delhi–Indira Gandhi (resumes December 14, 2026), Denpasar, Doha, Dubai–International, Fukuoka, General Santos, Guam, Hanoi, Ho Chi Minh City, Hong Kong, Honolulu, Iloilo, Jakarta–Soekarno‐Hatta, Koror, Kuala Lumpur–International, Los Angeles, Melbourne, Mumbai–Shivaji (begins December 15, 2026), Nagoya–Centrair, New York–JFK, Osaka–Kansai, Perth, Port Moresby, Puerto Princesa, Quanzhou, Riyadh, San Francisco, Seattle/Tacoma, Seoul–Incheon, Shanghai–Pudong, Singapore, Sydney–Kingsford Smith, Taipei–Taoyuan, Tokyo–Haneda, Tokyo–Narita, Toronto–Pearson, Vancouver, Xiamen; Seasonal: Sapporo–Chitose; Seasonal charter: Medina
Philippines AirAsia	Bacolod, Bangkok–Don Mueang, Cagayan de Oro, Caticlan, Cebu, Da Nang, Hanoi, Iloilo, Kalibo, Kaohsiung, Kota Kinabalu, Kuala Lumpur–International, Macau, Taipei–Taoyuan, Tokyo–Narita
Qantas	Brisbane, Sydney–Kingsford Smith
Qatar Airways	Doha
Qingdao Airlines	Changsha
Riyadh Air	Riyadh
Royal Brunei Airlines	Bandar Seri Begawan
Saudia	Jeddah, Riyadh
Scoot	Singapore
Shenzhen Airlines	Nanning, Shenzhen
Singapore Airlines	Singapore
Starlux Airlines	Taipei–Taoyuan
Thai Airways International	Bangkok–Suvarnabhumi
Turkish Airlines	Istanbul
United Airlines	Guam, Koror, San Francisco
VietJet Air	Ho Chi Minh City
Vietnam Airlines	Hanoi, Ho Chi Minh City
West Air	Changsha
XiamenAir	Chongqing, Fuzhou, Quanzhou, Xiamen

=== Cargo ===
Airlines	Destinations
Air Hong Kong	Cebu, Hong Kong
ANA Cargo	Tokyo–Haneda, Tokyo–Narita
Central Airlines	Ezhou
China Cargo Airlines	Shanghai–Pudong
China Postal Airlines	Fuzhou, Yiwu
Hong Kong Air Cargo	Hong Kong
JAL Cargo	Tokyo–Haneda, Tokyo–Narita
Korean Air Cargo	Seoul–Incheon
Royal Air Philippines	Nanning
SF Airlines	Shenzhen
Skyway Airlines	Hong Kong
XiamenAir	Xiamen
YTO Cargo Airlines	Chennai, Hangzhou, Macau, Nanning

- Philippine Airlines also maintains integrated airport ground handling services, cargo operations and a full catering service for it and other airlines. This is composed of PAL Airport Services, Philippine Airlines Cargo and the PAL Inflight Center.

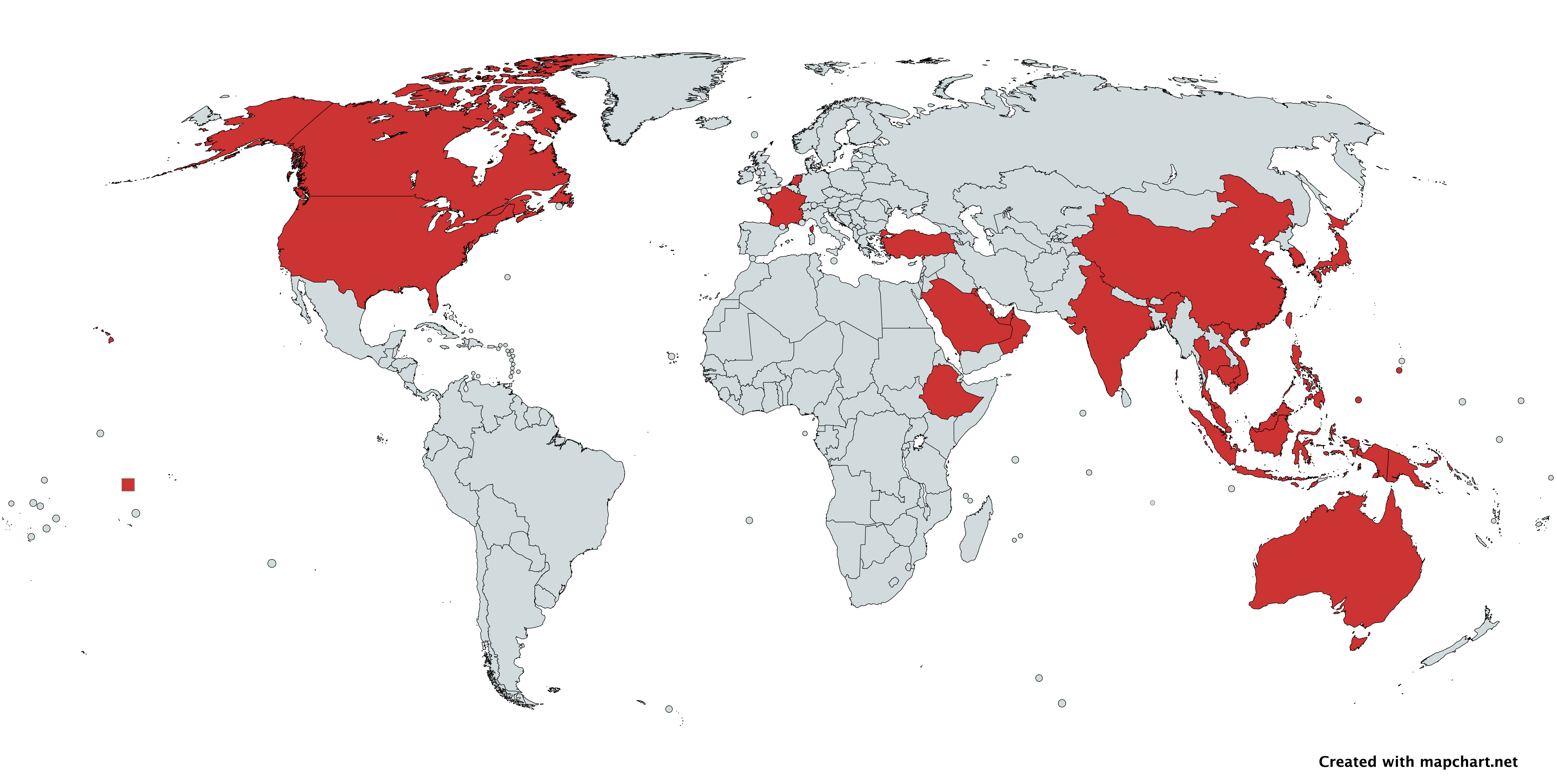
Ninoy Aquino International Airport passenger and cargo destinations

== Statistics ==
Data from Airports Council International and the Manila International Airport Authority.

Year	Passengers	% change	Aircraft movements	% change	Cargo volume (in tonnes)	% change
2003	12,955,809	Steady	—N/a	—N/a	—N/a	—N/a
2004	15,186,521	▲17.2	—N/a	—N/a	—N/a	—N/a
2005	16,216,031	▲6.8	—N/a	—N/a	—N/a	—N/a
2006	17,660,697	▲8.9	—N/a	—N/a	—N/a	—N/a
2007	20,467,627	▲15.9	—N/a	—N/a	—N/a	—N/a
2008	22,253,158	▲8.7	—N/a	—N/a	—N/a	—N/a
2009	24,108,825	▲8.3	186,966	Steady	348,994.25	Steady
2010	27,119,899	▲12.5	200,107	▲7.03	425,382.71	▲21.89
2011	29,552,264	▲9.0	217,743	▲8.81	410,377.05	▼3.53
2012	31,878,935	▲7.9	235,517	▲8.16	460,135.15	▲12.12
2013	32,865,000	▲3.1	237,050	▲0.65	457,077.17 (Note: Excluding figures for general aviation.)	▼0.66
2014	34,015,169	▲3.5	236,441	▼0.26	520,402.63	▲13.85
2015	36,681,601	▲7.84	249,288	▲5.43	586,890.53	▲12.78
2016	39,516,782	▲7.73	258,313	▲3.62	630,165.69	▲7.37
2017	42,022,484	▲6.34	258,366	▲0.02	662,256.99	▲5.09
2018	45,082,544	▲7.28	259,698	▲0.52	738,697.94	▲11.54
2019	47,898,046	▲6.25	277,530	▲6.87	721,708.09	▼2.30
2020	11,145,614	▼76.73	91,067	▼67.19	533,955.78	▼26.01
2021	8,015,385	▼28.09	121,095	▲24.8	588,370.92	▲10.19
2022	30,961,467	▲286.28	246,724	▲50.92	402,732.26	▼31.55
2023	45,299,607	▲46.31	270,911	▲9.80	485,879.38	▲20.65
2024	50,356,465	▲11.16	293,433	▲8.31	616,478.52	▲26.88

== Ground transport ==
=== Inter-terminal shuttle bus ===
NNIC operates a free landside shuttle service between all terminals for passengers making connections.

UBE Express operates a paid landside shuttle service between all terminals called the "NAIA Loop" for passengers making connections.

Philippine Airlines operates a free airside shuttle service between Terminals 1 and 2 for passengers making connections.

=== Bus ===
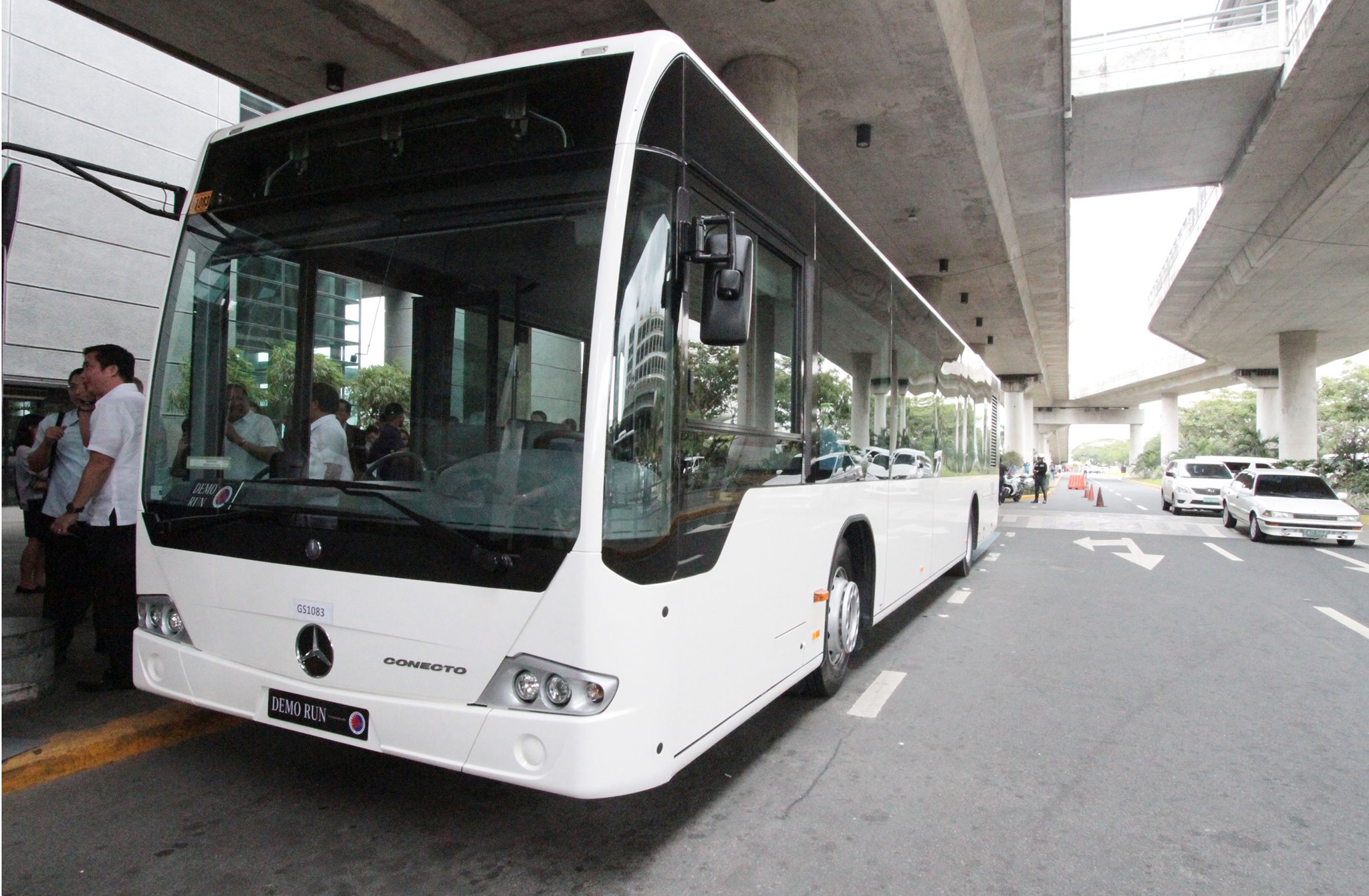
An UBE Express bus at Terminal 3

UBE Express "Route 43/PITX-NAIA Loop" buses operate Premium Point-to-Point Bus Services between the airport (Terminal 3) and the Parañaque Integrated Terminal Exchange (PITX), for onward connections to LRT Line 1.

UBE Express also provides point-to-point services to/from Manila, Makati, Muntinlupa, Quezon City, Pasay and Parañaque, all in Metro Manila; and Santa Rosa in Laguna. The Pasay service stops at the JAM Liner, Philtranco and Victory Liner terminals for passengers going to/coming from the provinces in Northern and Southern Luzon.

Genesis Transport provides service to/from Clark International Airport. HM Transport provides service to/from LRT Line 1's EDSA station and MRT Line 3's Taft Avenue station.

City buses provide service to/from PITX, Diliman in Quezon City, and Balagtas and San Jose del Monte in Bulacan, respectively. In addition, Citylink bus routes to and from Eastwood City in Quezon City have a terminal in Newport City, which is just across Terminal 3.

=== Jeepney ===
Jeepneys provide service to/from Parañaque and Pasay.

=== Rideshare ===
Rideshare pick up and drop off is available at the multi-level parking building of Terminal 3.

=== Train ===
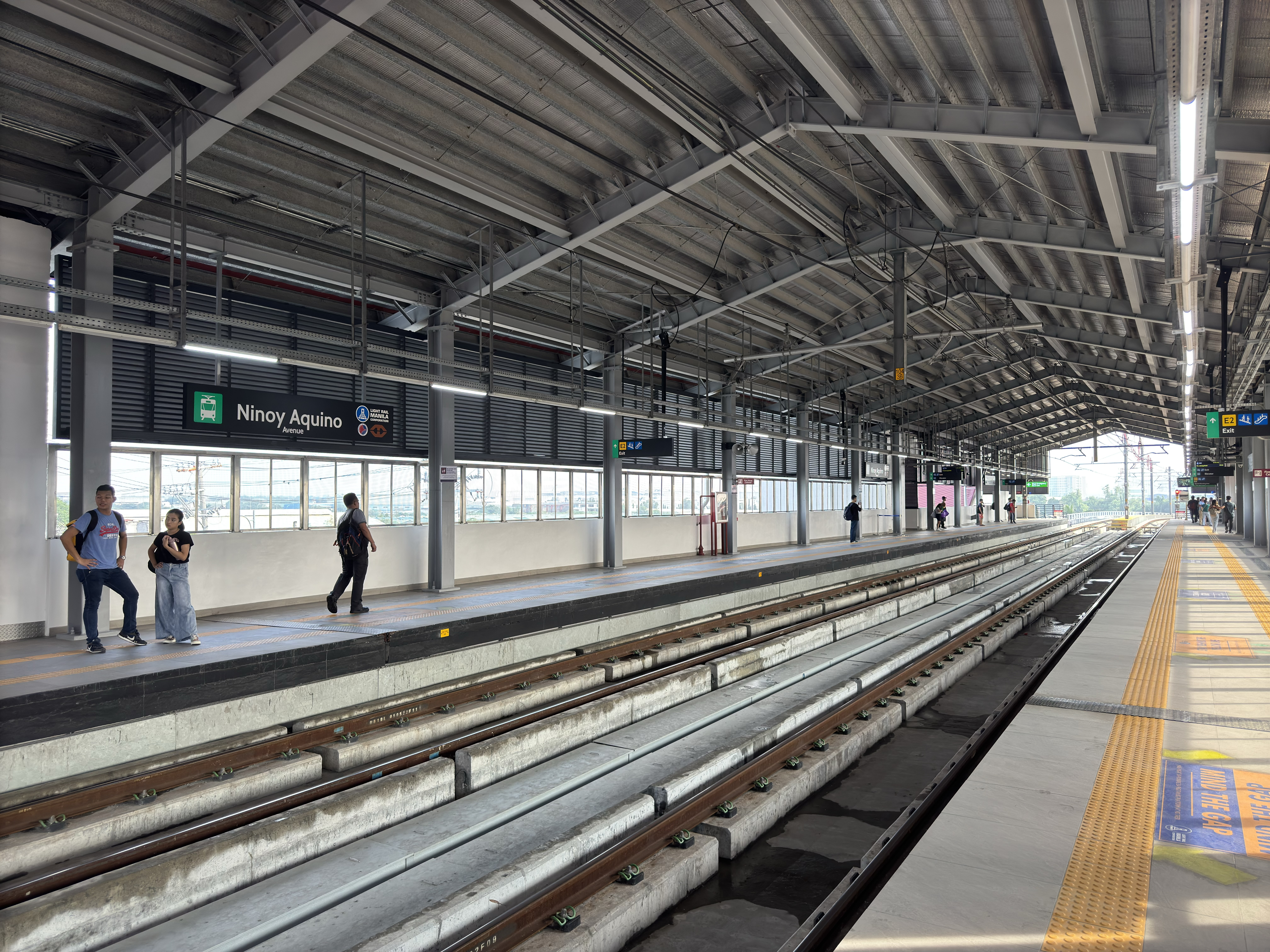
The Ninoy Aquino Avenue station on LRT Line 1

The nearest train station to NAIA is LRT Line 1's Ninoy Aquino Avenue station, inaugurated in November 2024. However, there is no direct connection between the station and the airport terminals. The absence of a direct link is attributed to regulatory constraints imposed by the Civil Aviation Authority of the Philippines (CAAP), which mandates a 4-kilometer (2.5 mi) radius clearance from airport runways to ensure aviation safety. Right-of-way considerations also influenced the station's placement.

From the Ninoy Aquino Avenue station, passengers can access NAIA via secondary transport modes such as jeepneys or taxis. While the station is 1.5 kilometers (0.93 mi) from Terminal 1, the distance and lack of pathways may make walking with luggage challenging.

To address the absence of a direct rail link to the airport, the Metro Manila Subway is under construction. The subway includes a station at NAIA Terminal 3. Transportation Undersecretary for Railways Jeremy Regino described this as the "best solution" to the current connectivity issues. The subway is expected to commence partial operations by 2032. Once operational, it is expected to reduce travel time between Quezon City and NAIA to approximately 35 minutes.

== Future ==
=== Terminal reassignments ===
The following terminal reassignments are planned under NNIC's management: Terminal 1 would exclusively serve Philippine Airlines flights, Terminal 2 would maintain its current status as an all-domestic terminal, and Terminal 3 would be fully dedicated to international flights of Cebu Pacific, the AirAsia Group, and all foreign airlines. This would require the remaining airlines operating at Terminal 1 to transfer to Terminal 3, and Philippines AirAsia to temporarily move its domestic flights to accommodate Cebu Pacific's domestic flights until Terminal 2's expansion is completed. A newer plan by NNIC, set for possible implementation by February 2027, would reassign Terminal 1 to international flights of low-cost carriers, Terminal 2 for domestic Cebu Pacific and AirAsia flights, Terminal 3 for international flights of all full-service carriers, and Terminal 5 for domestic Philippine Airlines flights once the terminal opens.

=== Renaming proposals ===
The entrance of Ninoy Aquino International Airport Terminal 1, whose name has been the subject of various renaming proposals by Philippine lawmakers.

Repeated efforts to rename the airport have not succeeded. In May 2018, then-lawyer Larry Gadon led an online petition at change.org aiming to restore the original name of the airport, Manila International Airport (MIA). Gadon said the renaming of MIA to NAIA in 1987 was "well in advance of the 10-year prescription period for naming public sites after dead personalities".

In June 2020, House Deputy Speaker Paolo Duterte, citing the need of the airport to represent the Filipino people, filed a bill seeking to rename the airport to Paliparang Pandaigdig ng Pilipinas (lit. transl. International Airport of the Philippines). The bill was coauthored by Marinduque Representative Lord Allan Velasco and ACT-CIS Representative Eric Go Yap.

In August 2020, Gadon filed a petition before the Supreme Court questioning the validity of Republic Act No. 6639, the law that named it NAIA. Gadon asserted that Aquino was not among the "pantheon" of the country's declared official heroes. A month later, the Supreme Court unanimously denied the petition to nullify the law for lack of merit.

In April 2022, Duterte Youth Representative Ducielle Cardema filed a bill returning the airport to its original name, claiming the name should not have been "politicized in the first place". Cardema had the bill refiled in July 2022.

In June 2022, Negros Oriental 3rd district Representative Arnolfo Teves Jr. filed a bill renaming the airport to Ferdinand E. Marcos International Airport after former President Ferdinand Marcos, who authorized the airport's rehabilitation and development through an executive order in 1972. Teves stressed that it is "more appropriate to rename it to the person who has contributed to the idea and execution of the said noble project". The bill drew criticism from former senator Franklin Drilon, who said that the renaming would entail historical revisionism.

In February 2024, Transportation Secretary Jaime Bautista said that renaming the airport was not included in the privatization proposals of the San Miguel Corporation–SAP and Company Consortium, which won the bid to operate and maintain the airport.

== Accidents and incidents ==
- On July 25, 1971, a Pan American World Airways Boeing 707-321C named "Clipper Rising Sun" was on a cargo flight from San Francisco to Saigon. While on a VOR/DME approach onto Manila runway 24, the aircraft struck Mount Kamunay at an altitude of 770 meters (2,525 ft). The four occupants were killed.
- On November 15, 1974, an Orient Air System and Integrated Services Douglas C-47A registered RP-C570 was damaged beyond repair after a forced landing in a paddy field shortly after take-off following failure of the starboard engine. One of the eight people on board was killed.
- On February 7, 1980, a China Airlines Boeing 707 from Taipei Chiang Kai-Shek International Airport operating as Flight 811 undershot the runway on landing and caught fire, causing two fatalities.
- On April 28, 1989, a MATS Douglas C-47A registered RP-C81 crashed shortly after takeoff on a non-scheduled domestic passenger flight to Roxas Airport following an engine failure. MATS did not have a licence to fly passengers. Seven of the 22 passengers were killed. The aircraft had earlier made a forced landing on a taxiway.
- On July 21, 1989, a Philippine Airlines BAC One-Eleven operating Flight 124 overran a runway in poor visibility and heavy rain. No passengers or crew were killed but eight people on the ground were killed when the plane crossed a road.
- On May 11, 1990, a Philippine Airlines Boeing 737-300 operating Flight 143 suffered an explosion in the center fuel tank near the terminal while preparing for takeoff. The fire and smoke engulfed the aircraft before it could be evacuated. The explosion was similar to what happened to TWA Flight 800 six years later. Eight people died.
- On May 18, 1990, an Aerolift Philippines Beechcraft 1900C-1 operating a domestic scheduled passenger flight bound for Surigao Airport crashed into a residential area following takeoff. The aircraft reportedly suffered an engine failure. All 21 occupants and 4 people on the ground were killed.
- On September 4, 2002, an Asian Spirit de Havilland Canada Dash 7-102 operating Flight 897 to Caticlan carrying 49 occupants was on approach to Caticlan Airport when the right main gear failed to deploy. The approach was abandoned and the crew decided to return to Manila for an emergency landing. The plane circled for about 35 minutes over Las Piñas to burn off fuel. The crew then carried out an emergency landing with the right gear retracted. After touchdown, the aircraft swerved off the runway onto a grassy area. There were no reported injuries or fatalities, but the aircraft was written off.
- On November 11, 2002, a Laoag International Airlines Fokker F27 operating Flight 585 took off from Manila runway 31 just after 6 p.m. for a flight to Laoag International Airport. Shortly after takeoff, trouble developed in the left engine. The pilot declared an emergency and attempted to land, but decided at the last minute to ditch into the sea. The aircraft broke up and sank in the water to a depth of about 18 meters (60 ft). 19 of the 34 occupants were killed.
- On November 8, 2003, former Air Transportation Office chief Panfilo Villaruel and Philippine Navy lieutenant Richard Gatchillar seized the control tower of Terminal 2 around midnight armed with guns and explosives, claiming that they wanted to expose government corruption. They forced out all six air traffic controllers and barricaded themselves inside the control room, causing the diversion of several flights. After three hours, police SWAT teams stormed the control room and opened fire, killing both men.
- On October 17, 2009, a Victoria Air Douglas DC-3, registered RP-C550, crashed shortly after takeoff on a flight to Puerto Princesa International Airport after an engine malfunctioned. All on board died.
- On December 10, 2011, a Beechcraft 65–80 Queen Air cargo plane en route to San Jose crashed into houses next to Felixberto Serrano Elementary School in Parañaque after taking off. The crash was attributed to pilot error. At least 14 people including 3 crew members on board the aircraft died, and over 20 were injured. Approximately 50 houses in the residential area were set ablaze.
- On December 20, 2013, gunmen ambushed Ukol Talumpa, the mayor of Labangan, Zamboanga del Sur, in front of the arrival hall of Terminal 3, killing him, his wife and two others and injuring five people.
- On August 16, 2018, Xiamen Airlines Flight 8667 crash-landed amidst heavy monsoon rains. The 737-800 skidded off the end of the runway. All 157 passengers and crew were unharmed, however, the aircraft was written off.
- On March 29, 2020, a Lionair IAI Westwind registered RP-C5880 burst into flames on runway 24 during takeoff. The plane was conducting a medical evacuation mission bound for Haneda Airport, Japan. All eight occupants consisting of three aircraft crew, three medical crew, and two passengers died.
- On May 4, 2025, a car crash occurred after an SUV driven by a 47-year-old man crashed into the walkway near the departure area entrance of Terminal 1, killing a 29-year-old man and a five-year-old girl, and injuring four others. An investigation was also launched into the bollards at the curb which had failed to stop the vehicle.

== See also ==
- Nichols Field
- Colonel Jesus Villamor Air Base
- List of airports in the Philippines
- List of airports in the Greater Manila Area
