= Expo Pilipino =

World fair

1998–99 Mabalacat

Overview
- BIE-class: Unrecognized exposition
- Name: Philippine Centennial Exposition; Expo Filipino
- Building(s): Freedom Ring

Participant(s)
- Organizations: 150

Location
- Country: Philippines
- City: Mabalacat
- Venue: Expo Filipino Site, Clark Special Economic Zone
- Coordinates: 15°12′18.6″N 120°31′38.5″E

The Philippine Centennial International Exposition 1998, also known as Expo Pilipino, was a world fair organized as part of the 100th anniversary of the June 12, 1898 declaration of Philippine Independence. The event, which showcased Philippine history and culture, was held in a 60-hectare site at the Clark Special Economic Zone in Mabalacat, Pampanga.

The exposition, including its site, was a project of the National Centennial Commission (NCC) and the Philippine Centennial Exposition Corporation.

== Facilities ==
The Expo Pilipino had a 35,000-seat amphitheater which was used as a site for concerts, ecumenical services and political rallies after exhibitions at the complex were halted.

== Participants ==
The exposition had a projected 150 investors participating as of May 1998.

== Budget ==
The construction of Expo Filipino entailed a total budget of ₱3.5 billion (US$ 63.64 million). Then-President Fidel V. Ramos directed three state-run financial institutions—Social Security System (SSS), Government Service Insurance System (GSIS), and Land Bank of the Philippines—to lend a total of ₱1.4-billion (US$25.45-million) to the joint venture.

== Legacy ==
The project was criticized for the excessive amounts of money that went to its construction. Particular targets of criticism were: a "Freedom Ring" (>₱1.2-billion); a parking lot (₱111-million); an entry zone (₱118-million); display villages (₱290-million); and an artificial river (₱76-million) that had bridges spanning it (total ₱32-million). Expo Filipino closed down in 1999 under President Joseph Estrada, allegedly after sustaining heavy losses.

The Expo Pilipino site was reopened on December 8, 2005 as Clark Expo, an events venue by the Clark Development Corporation (CDC) for trade shows and other events. The former Expo Pilipino venue was redeveloped as part of President Gloria Macapagal Arroyo's directive to boost tourism and investment activities inside the Clark Special Economic Zone. The site served as the venue of the 25th anniversary celebration of the Philippines' longest-running noontime show, Eat Bulaga!, dubbed as Eat Bulaga! Silver Special held on November 19, 2004, as well as venue for the grand finale of the first season of the reality television show Pinoy Big Brother.

A portion of the Clark Expo site was redeveloped into Nayong Pilipino Clark.

In early 2010, most of the remaining site was relaunched as Clark Education City by the Australian International Training and Management Group (AITMG). Initial construction of the campus cost AU$6-million, with a capacity of 15,000 students. The institution delivers a range of vocational courses accredited by the Australian government, English-language teaching, and customized training for mining, oil and gas, and affiliated industries. The facility now operates as Site Skills Training RTO 32531, which is one of the business units of Site Group International in the Philippines.

== See also ==
- Philippine Centennial

Preceded by UP Diliman Theater; Quezon City	Miss Earth venue 2008	Succeeded by Boracay Convention Center; Malay, Aklan
