= Cebu Pacific =

Low-cost airline of the Philippines

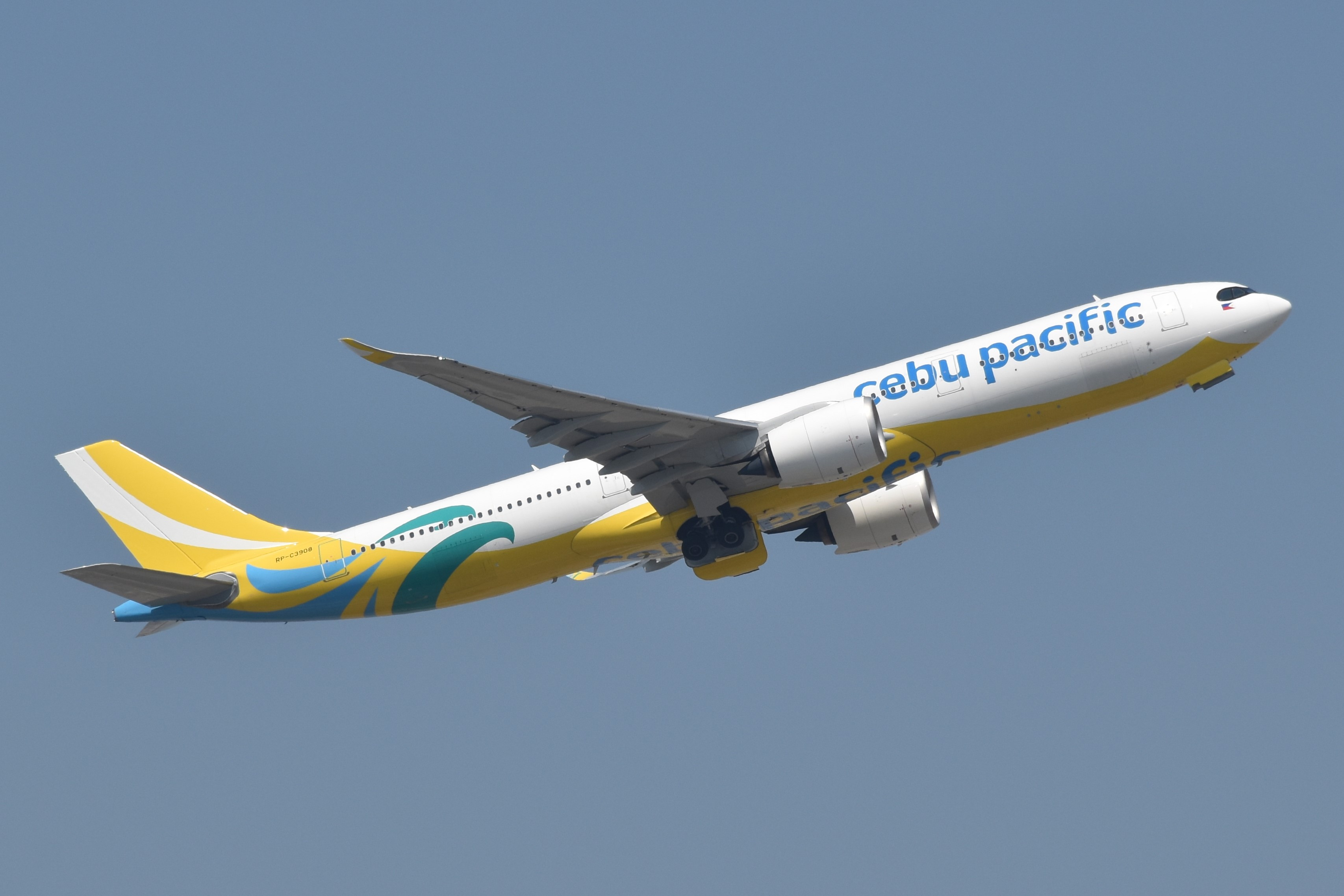
- Cebu Pacific Airbus A330-900
IATA	ICAO	Call sign
5J	CEB	CEBU
- Founded: August 26, 1988; 38 years ago
- Commenced operations: March 8, 1996; 30 years ago
- AOC #: 2009002
- Operating bases: Cebu; Clark; Davao; Iloilo; Manila
- Frequent-flyer program: Go Rewards
- Subsidiaries: Cebgo; Cebu Pacific Cargo; Aviation Partnership Philippines; 1Aviation Groundhandling (60%)
- Fleet size: 82
- Destinations: 62 (including Cebgo)
- Parent company: JG Summit Holdings
- Traded as: PSE: CEB
- Headquarters: Main headquarters: Pasay, Philippines; Registered office: Robinsons Galleria Cebu, Cebu City
- Key people: Lance Y. Gokongwei (chairman); Alexander G. Lao (president & CCO); Michael B. Szucs (CEO); Javier Luis Massot Ramis De Ayreflor (COO)
- Revenue: ▲ ₱104.9 billion (2024)
- Operating income: ▲ ₱9.17 billion (2024)
- Net income: ▼ ₱5.40 billion (2024)
- Total assets: ▲ ₱238.17 billion (2024)
- Total equity: ▲ ₱10.02 billion (2024)
- Employees: 6,120 (2024)
- Website: www.cebupacificair.com

Notes
- Financials are from the PSE.

Cebu Air, Inc. (PSE: CEB), operating as Cebu Pacific (stylized in all lowercase), is a Philippine low-cost airline based in Pasay, Metro Manila. Founded in 1988, the airline is the first low-cost carrier in Asia and is also the largest airline in the Philippines by fleet size. It offers scheduled flights to both domestic and international destinations. The airline operates flights from five bases in Cebu, Clark, Davao, Iloilo, and Manila.

With its low-cost business model and extensive destination network, Cebu Pacific became the Philippines' largest airline based on number of passengers flown on domestic and international routes in 2010, overtaking rival Philippine Airlines (PAL). According to Civil Aeronautics Board data, Cebu Pacific flew a total of 2.45 million passengers in the first quarter of 2010, nearly 110,000 more than PAL, which carried 2.34 million systemwide during the same period.

== History ==
=== Foundation and growth (1988–2006) ===
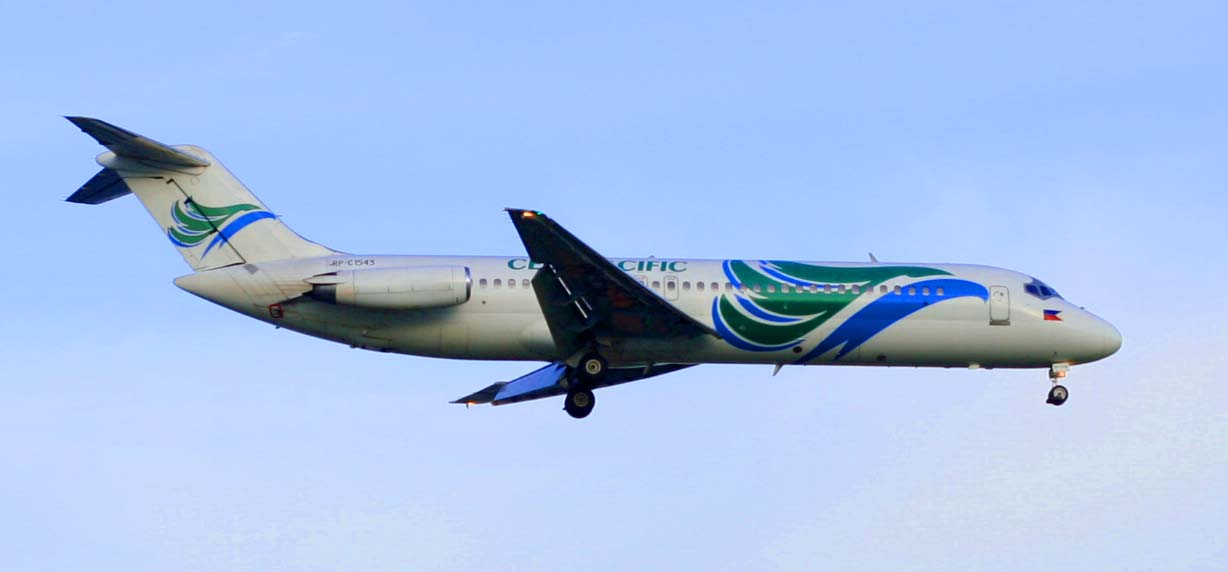
A McDonnell Douglas DC-9-32, 2006

Cebu Pacific was established on August 26, 1988. Republic Act No. 7151, which grants a legislative franchise to Cebu Air, Inc. to operate, was approved on August 30, 1991. The airline began operations on March 8, 1996, with its first flight from Manila to Cebu. Domestic services began following market deregulation by the Philippine government. The airline was subsequently acquired by JG Summit Holdings, owned at the time by John Gokongwei.

The airline temporarily ceased operations in February 1998 after being grounded by the government following the crash of Flight 387 that killed 104, but resumed services later the next month following re-certification of its aircraft. It initially started with 24 domestic flights daily among Metro Manila, Metro Cebu, and Metro Davao. By the end of 2001, its operations had grown to about 80 daily flights to 18 domestic destinations.

In the 2000s, Cebu Pacific was granted rights to operate international flights to the region, including Malaysia, Indonesia, Singapore, Thailand, South Korea, Hong Kong, and Guam. International flights were launched on November 22, 2001, with a twice-daily service to Hong Kong. Thrice-weekly flights to Seoul commenced on March 1, 2002, followed by Singapore on October 1. Other regional flights were introduced and suspended later; however, including flights to Singapore (from November 6, 2002, to January 2003) and from Manila via Subic to Seoul (from December 2002) due in part to the effects of the SARS epidemic.

On November 10, 2005, Cebu Pacific launched "Go", a fare discount program that permanently reduced its fares by half. The move was done to increase the airline's revenue by twenty percent. Following this, Cebu Pacific experienced significant passenger growth, hiking up its sales volume by ninety percent. Its president and CEO, Lance Gokongwei, anticipated that with the low fares, air travel would be cheaper than sea travel. He further added that:

This is all about getting people to think about flying. For those who fly today, we would like to encourage them to fly more frequently, and for those who haven’t flown before, we want to welcome them on board and introduce them to air travel.

The airline resumed its Manila–Singapore flights on August 31, 2006, and launched a direct flight from Cebu to Singapore on October 23. It was the first low-cost airline to serve the Cebu-Singapore-Cebu sector, and competing directly with Singapore Airlines subsidiary SilkAir, the only Philippine carrier serving the route for years until Philippine Airlines resumed direct service in 2017. Cebu Pacific's direct Cebu–Hong Kong flights began on October 2, 2006, making it the Philippine carrier to serve the Cebu-Hong Kong-Cebu route after PAL terminated its direct service and began code-sharing with Cathay Pacific on the route. Manila–Bangkok flights were also launched in the same year.

=== Initial expansion (2007–2011) ===
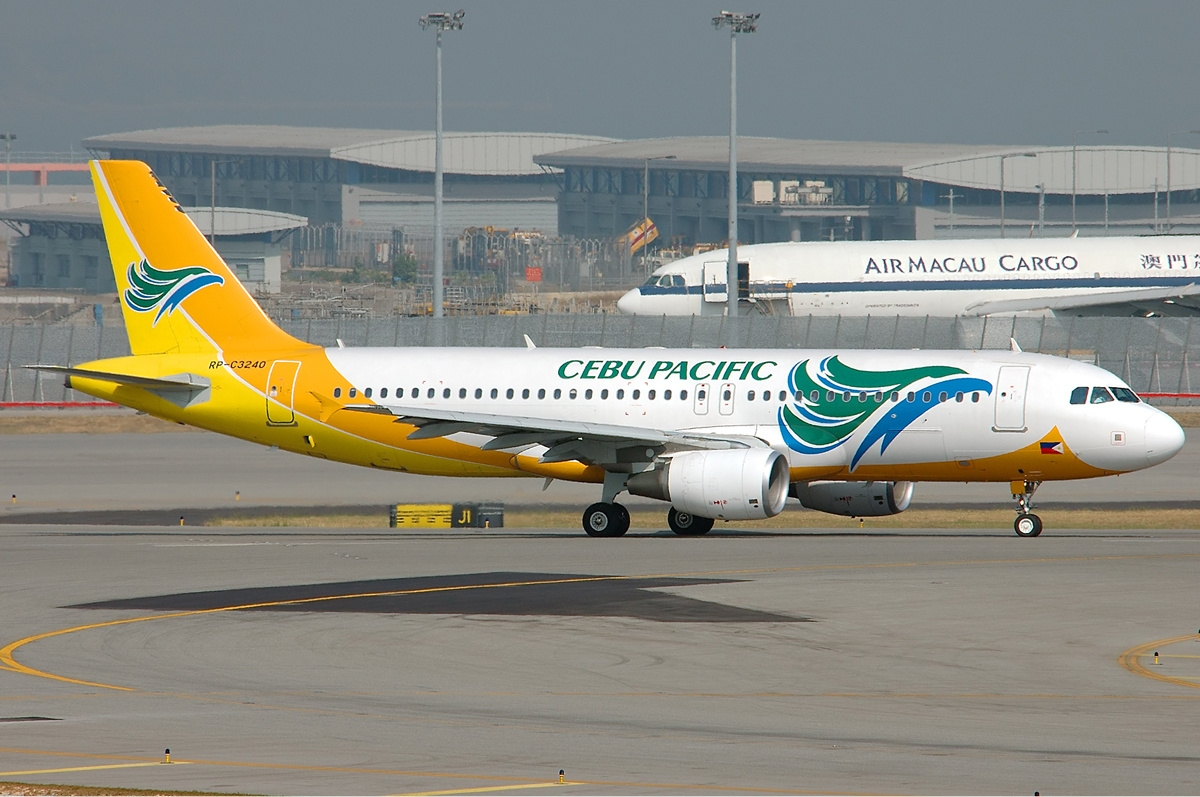
Cebu Pacific's first Airbus aircraft, an A320-200 (wearing the 2005–2016 livery), as pictured at Hong Kong International Airport in 2005

In April 2008, Cebu Pacific launched direct flights to its first two destinations in Vietnam: Hanoi and Ho Chi Minh City.

On May 8, 2008, Cebu Pacific opened Francisco Bangoy International Airport in Davao City as its third hub and launched direct flights from Davao to Singapore, Hong Kong, and Iloilo. In late 2007, Cebu Pacific announced plans to launch non-stop flights to the United States West Coast, Houston, and Chicago by mid 2009.

Cebu Pacific's plans to begin international flights from Clark in 2007 were initially unsuccessful when its request was denied. The nations involved came to an agreement that Cebu Pacific would be only allowed to operate charter flights from Clark to the respective countries' airport(s). Only Singapore initially agreed to allow Cebu Pacific to fly scheduled flights from Clark. After launching flights between Clark and Cebu in 2006, on November 8, 2008, the airline commenced international flights from Clark to Hong Kong, Macau, Bangkok and Singapore, making Clark its fourth hub.

On May 28, 2008, Cebu Pacific was named as the world's number one airline in terms of growth. The airline was also ranked fifth in Asia for Budget Airline passengers transported and 23rd in the world. On November 20, 2008, it started operating direct flights to Japan, starting with Osaka.

In August 2009, Cebu Pacific became the first airline in the Philippines to use social media; the airline created a fan page on Facebook and Twitter. In October 2010, the airline completed an initial public offering of 30.4% of outstanding shares, raising ₱23.3 billion prior to an exercise of an overallotment option. By January 2011, the airline flew its 50 millionth passenger from Manila to Beijing.

=== Further growth and re-branding (2012–2020) ===
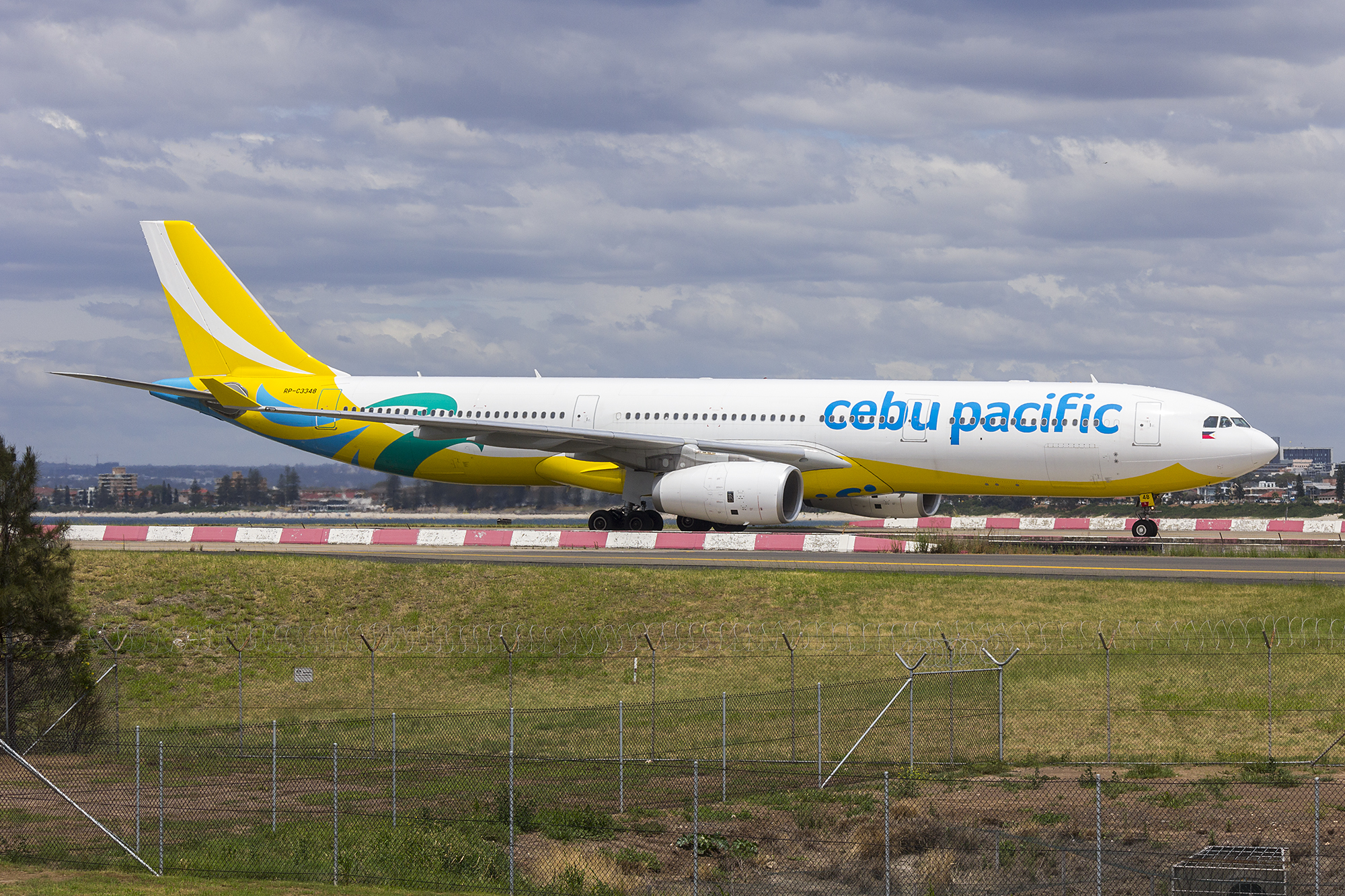
The entry of the Airbus A330 in 2013 coincided with the launching of Cebu Pacific's low-cost, long-haul international flights.

Cebu Pacific continued its network expansion in the 2010s. Continuing its regional expansion, it launched flights to Siem Reap and Xiamen in 2012. Domestically, it opened two local bases in Kalibo and Iloilo. It also expanded its Japanese operations, launching flights to Tokyo and Nagoya in March 2014, followed by Fukuoka in December 2015.

After taking delivery of its first two Airbus A330-300s, Cebu Pacific commenced international long-haul flights on October 7, 2013, to Dubai. Between 2014 and 2015, it launched flights to more destinations in the Middle East, including Kuwait City, Doha, Dammam, and Riyadh. It also launched flights to Sydney—its first destination in Australia—followed by Melbourne in 2018. All Middle Eastern destinations, except Dubai, were terminated in 2017.

On December 29, 2014, Cebu Pacific was fined ₱52 million following the numerous flight cancellations and delays during the December 2014 Christmas peak season.

On January 8, 2015, the airline flew its 100 millionth passenger. On June 1, Cebu Pacific revealed its new logo that represents the colors of the Philippines and also symbolizes as an evolution of a low-cost pioneer. The airline received its first Airbus A320 painted in the new livery on January 22, 2016. An Airbus A320-200 (RP-C4101) was the last remaining aircraft that had the 2005 livery until it was returned to its lessor due to the expiration of its lease in September 2026.

In March 2016, Cebu Pacific launched flights to Guam, making it the first and only destination in the United States. This route was suspended in December 2019, along with Siem Reap.

On October 20, 2017, Cebu Pacific opened Laguindingan Airport as its seventh base. On the same day, it flew its 150 millionth passenger to Cagayan de Oro. In 2018, Cebgo, Cebu Pacific's regional subsidiary, launched flights to Basco, Batanes.

=== COVID-19 pandemic (2020–2022) ===
The COVID-19 pandemic significantly impacted the operations of Cebu Pacific in 2020, causing a three-month suspension of operations during the enhanced community quarantine in Luzon and a reduction of its workforce. Due to low passenger demand, the airline laid off 1,300 employees that year, and sent fourteen aircraft to indefinite storage in Alice Springs. By the end of the year, it reported a net loss of ₱22.2 billion, its first annual loss since 2008.

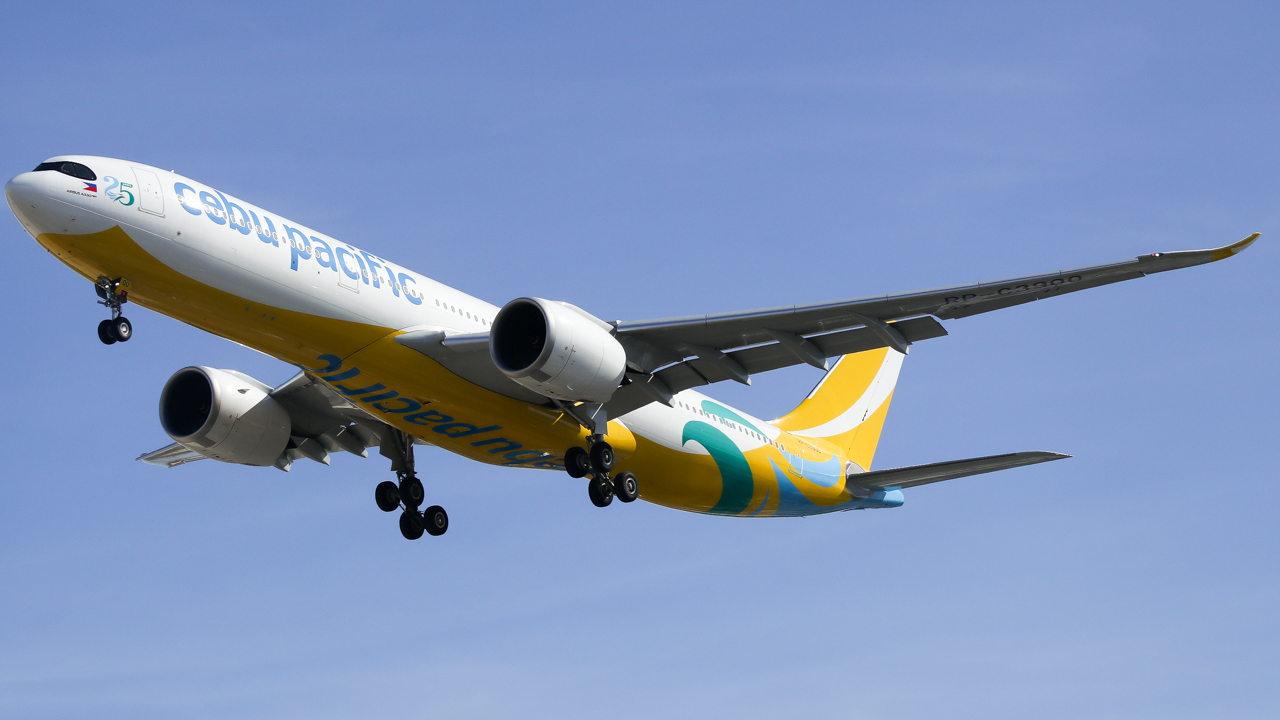
This Airbus A330-900 has a '25' decal on the left side of the cockpit to commemorate the airline's 25th anniversary in 2021.

On March 8, 2021, Cebu Pacific celebrated its twenty-fifth anniversary. In May, it closed three fundraising transactions totaling ₱40.5 billion (US$822 million) to help the airline recover from the pandemic, which consisted of a ₱16 billion loan from government-owned financial institutions and private banks, ₱12.5 billion from preferred stock, and ₱12 billion from convertible bonds. As several COVID-19 variants emerged that year, which led to another spike in cases, it widened its losses to ₱24.9 billion.

As travel demand recovers, it started rehiring retrenched employees in November 2021. In March 2022, Cebu Pacific flew its 200 millionth passenger from Manila to Cebu. By December 2022, the airline operated at 92% of pre-pandemic levels.

On December 5, 2022, Lance Gokongwei resigned as the airline's president and chief executive officer (CEO)−a position he held since the airline's inception in 1996. His resignation took effect on January 1, 2023, and was subsequently elevated to chairman. Alexander Lao was then appointed president, while Michael B. Szucs assumed his role as CEO.

=== Post-pandemic recovery and third expansion (2023–present) ===
On January 25, 2023, Cebu Pacific launched its new campaign, "Let's Fly Every Juan", at a press conference at the Ayala Museum. It then resumed its remaining international flights that were suspended during the pandemic, including China, with the exception of Beijing. On April 21, Cebu Pacific reopened its Pampanga hub at Clark International Airport. By the end of 2023, after three consecutive financial years of losses, Cebu Pacific reported its first full-year post-pandemic profit.

On February 28, 2024, Cebu Pacific was awarded the Best Airline award at the Routes Asia Awards 2024 for its "exceptional contributions to airport and destination marketing in the Asia Pacific region". It was also awarded Best Low-Cost Airline Brand and Most Sustainable Low-Cost Airline in the Philippines for 2023 by the World Economic Magazine.

In July 2024, Cebu Pacific shelved its plans to expand its long-haul operations. It then reduced its flights to China due to weak demand amid geopolitical tensions, and likewise terminated flights to Beijing. The airline focused instead on expanding regionally within a five-hour radius, launching flights to secondary cities in Southeast Asia. On July 16, 2024, it expanded its Bangkok operations by launching thrice-weekly flights to Don Mueang International Airport to complement its twice-daily Suvarnabhumi flights. As part of its regional expansion, it started flying thrice weekly to Da Nang on December 7, 2023, Kaohsiung on August 16, 2024 (after a fifteen-year hiatus), and Chiang Mai on October 29. Continuing its domestic expansion, Cebu Pacific expanded its regional network in Visayas and Mindanao, launching eighteen new inter-island routes from its hubs in Cebu, Davao City, and Iloilo, as well as select flights from Clark. Likewise, new international services from these hubs were either launched or revived: new direct flights from Cebu to Bangkok and Osaka began in mid-October, while Davao–Hong Kong services were relaunched in the same month including a new Davao–Bangkok service. It also resumed international flights from Iloilo International Airport after a four-year hiatus.

On December 11, 2024, Cebu Pacific flew its 250 millionth passenger from Singapore to Manila. On January 16, 2025, it launched direct flights to Sapporo. On March 31, direct Iloilo–Bangkok flights were launched until its suspension in 2026. On April 7, direct flights were launched between Cebu and Ho Chi Minh City, in response to PAL launching its own service a month later.

Cebu Pacific entered the aircraft leasing business in May 2025, when it signed a wet lease deal with flyadeal. From June to August 2025, it lent two Airbus A320-200 jets (including crew and maintenance) to cater to the Saudi low-cost carrier's peak summer season while local travel demand is low during those months. CEB followed this up in July 2026 with another wet-lease deal with Vietnam Airlines, deploying one Airbus A320neo to service select domestic routes from Ho Chi Minh City until September.

On July 14, 2026, it announced the introduction of the Starlink in-flight Wi-Fi beginning in 2027, becoming the first low-cost carrier in Southeast Asia to do so.

== Corporate affairs ==
Cebu Pacific headquarters, as viewed from the Ninoy Aquino International Airport runway

Cebu Pacific operations are headquartered at the Cebu Pacific Building along Domestic Road in Pasay., while it is domiciled (official business address) within Robinsons Galleria Cebu City. The airline is a subsidiary of JG Summit Holdings.

=== Partnerships ===
Cebu Pacific was the only Philippines-based member airline of Northwest Airlines' WorldPerks award travel program. WorldPerks offered regular travelers the ability to obtain free tickets, first-class upgrades on flights and other types of rewards. On August 1, 2006, Northwest and Cebu Pacific ended their mileage-accrual agreement.

On May 16, 2016, Cebu Pacific became a founding member of the world's largest low-cost carrier alliance, Value Alliance, becoming the only Philippines-based carrier to be a member of an alliance. It joined other pioneer members such as Scoot, Jeju Air, Nok Air and NokScoot, Tigerair, Tigerair Australia, and Vanilla Air in the low-cost carrier network.

=== Subsidiaries ===
==== Cebgo ====
Cebgo is the airline's regional subsidiary. It operates an all-turboprop fleet of ATR 72-600 aircraft and is used in regional domestic routes. It was founded in May 2015 following the acquisition of Tigerair Philippines by Cebu Pacific.

==== Cebu Pacific Cargo ====
Cebu Pacific Cargo operates two dedicated cargo turboprop aircraft. The airline announced in 2018 that it would enter the dedicated cargo market to support the increase in demand for logistics.

==== Aviation Partnership Philippines ====
In April 2005, Aviation Partnership Philippines (A plus) was initially formed as joint venture of Singapore Airlines Engineering Company and Cebu Pacific to provide line and light maintenance service and started its operation in July of the similar year. In November 2020, Cebu Pacific took over the Aplus.

==== AirSWIFT ====
On October 7, 2024, Cebu Pacific announced the acquisition of AirSWIFT for PHP 1.75 billion, approved by ALI Capital Corp and Cebu Pacific's board of directors. Following the acquisition, there were no changes in the flight schedule and services of AirSWIFT.

During its time with Cebu Pacific and its integration period to CebGo, AirSWIFT operated flights from Manila and Clark to El Nido and from El Nido to other popular tourist sites in the Philippines such as Boracay, Cebu, Coron and Bohol.

It was completely consolidated into CebGo in the second semester of 2026.

==== 1Aviation Groundhandling ====
In March 2018, Cebu Pacific created a subsidiary 1Aviation Ground Handling Services Corp., after the Manila International Airport Authority (MIAA) did not renew the contract of MIASCOR Ground Handling Corporation due to a series of luggage theft. In July 2018, Cebu Pacific sold its 60% shares in 1Aviation to the Philippine Airport Ground Support Solutions, Inc. (PAGSS), a company led by Jefferson G. Cheng.

=== Business highlights ===
Cebu Pacific Group business highlights
Financial performance (PHP billions)
Fiscal year	2008	2009	2010	2011	2012	2013	2014	2015	2016	2017	2018	2019	2020	2021	2022	2023	2024
Revenue	19.68	23.31	29.09	33.94	37.90	41.00	52.00	56.50	61.90	68.03	74.11	84.81	22.62	15.74	56.75	90.60	104.91
Expenses	17.96	20.15	22.64	30.60	35.24	38.60	47.84	46.80	49.65	57.90	67.06	72.19	43.39	38.90	68.18	82.02	95.74
Operating income	1.73	3.16	6.45	3.34	2.66	2.40	4.16	9.70	12.25	10.13	7.05	12.62	−20.77	−23.16	−11.43	8.60	9.17
Net income	−3.26	3.26	6.92	3.62	3.57	0.51	0.85	4.39	9.75	7.90	3.92	9.12	−22.24	−24.90	−13.98	7.92	5.40
Assets	32.56	35.32	49.94	55.68	61.41	67.53	76.06	84.83	100.51	109.08	129.39	157.73	128.46	138.25	147.16	187.18	238.17
Liabilities	28.56	28.06	32.03	36.51	39.37	46.45	54.52	59.87	67.00	69.29	89.29	112.83	105.77	127.64	150.04	182.41	228.14
Equity	4.00	7.26	17.91	19.17	22.04	21.08	21.54	24.96	33.51	39.79	40.10	44.90	22.69	10.61	−2.89	4.78	10.02
Operating highlights
Fiscal year	2008	2009	2010	2011	2012	2013	2014	2015	2016	2017	2018	2019	2020	2021	2022	2023	2024
Passengers (million)	6.67	8.76	10.46	11.93	13.26	14.35	16.90	18.38	19.13	19.75	20.28	22.47	5.03	3.41	14.85	20.87	24.54
Available seats (million)	8.54	11.31	12.26	13.83	16.04	17.52	20.11	22.25	22.25	23.49	23.91	26.01	6.62	5.63	19.72	24.85	29.09
Load factor (%)	78.10	77.45	85.32	86.26	82.67	81.91	84.04	82.61	85.98	84.08	84.82	86.39	75.98	60.57	75.30	84.00	84.40
RPK (million)	5,653	7,056	8,860	10,531	11,533	12,927	16,213	19,872	21,220	21,301	21,736	24,883	5,275	2,479	11,870	21,934	25,520
ASK (million)	7,365	9,369	10,379	12,369	14,173	16,207	20,496	19,872	25,989	26,233	25,881	29,298	7,107	4,878	17,288	27,574	30,920
Fleet size	25	29	32	37	41	48	52	55	57	61	71	75	74	74	76	85	98

=== Environmental initiatives ===
As part of the airline's modernization and environmental initiatives, Cebu Pacific is replacing its existing aircraft with new fuel-efficient aircraft specifically the Airbus A320neo family by 2028, marketing the initiative as a pathway to "Experience a Neo Way to Fly". In addition, the airline used sustainable aviation fuel (SAF) initially on its delivery flights, before using SAF on a commercial passenger flight from Singapore to Manila on September 28, 2022, using an Airbus A321neo. The airline also signed a five-year agreement with Shell Aviation that would supply 25,000 metric tons of SAF to Cebu Pacific.

On November 3, 2022, Cebu Pacific received the Asia Environmental Sustainability Airline/Airline Group of the Year award from the Centre for Asia Pacific Aviation (CAPA) for its green initiative efforts in aviation industry.

On October 19, 2023, Cebu Pacific signed another five-year agreement with Neste, one of the largest producers of sustainable aviation fuel. The airline then completed its second SAF-powered flight on October 25, from Narita International Airport to Manila, also performed by an A321neo.

On February 15, 2024, Cebu Pacific earned a Gold rating in the 2023 CAPA-Envest Global Airline Sustainability Benchmarking Report for integrating sustainable aviation fuel (SAF) in its operations and its outstanding performance in reducing carbon emissions. In addition to its CAPA Gold rating, CEB improved its S&P Global ESG Score to 41 in 2023 from 38 in 2022, ranking in the 69th percentile among the 63 airlines assessed by the international financial market intelligence provider.

== Fleet ==
=== Current fleet ===
As of October 2026, Cebu Pacific operates an all-Airbus fleet composed of the following aircraft:

Cebu Pacific fleet
Aircraft	In service	Orders	Passengers	Notes
Airbus A320-200	10	—	180	RP-C4268 is wearing the "Let's Fly Every Juan" livery.
Airbus A320neo	26	3	188	
Airbus A320neo	26	3	194	
Airbus A321-200	7	—	230	
Airbus A321neo	25	78	236	Additional order of 70 with 82 options across the A320neo family in October 2024.
Airbus A330-900	14	2	459	Includes RP-C3906, an A330-900 prototype.
Total	82	83		

=== Gallery ===
Cebu Pacific current fleet

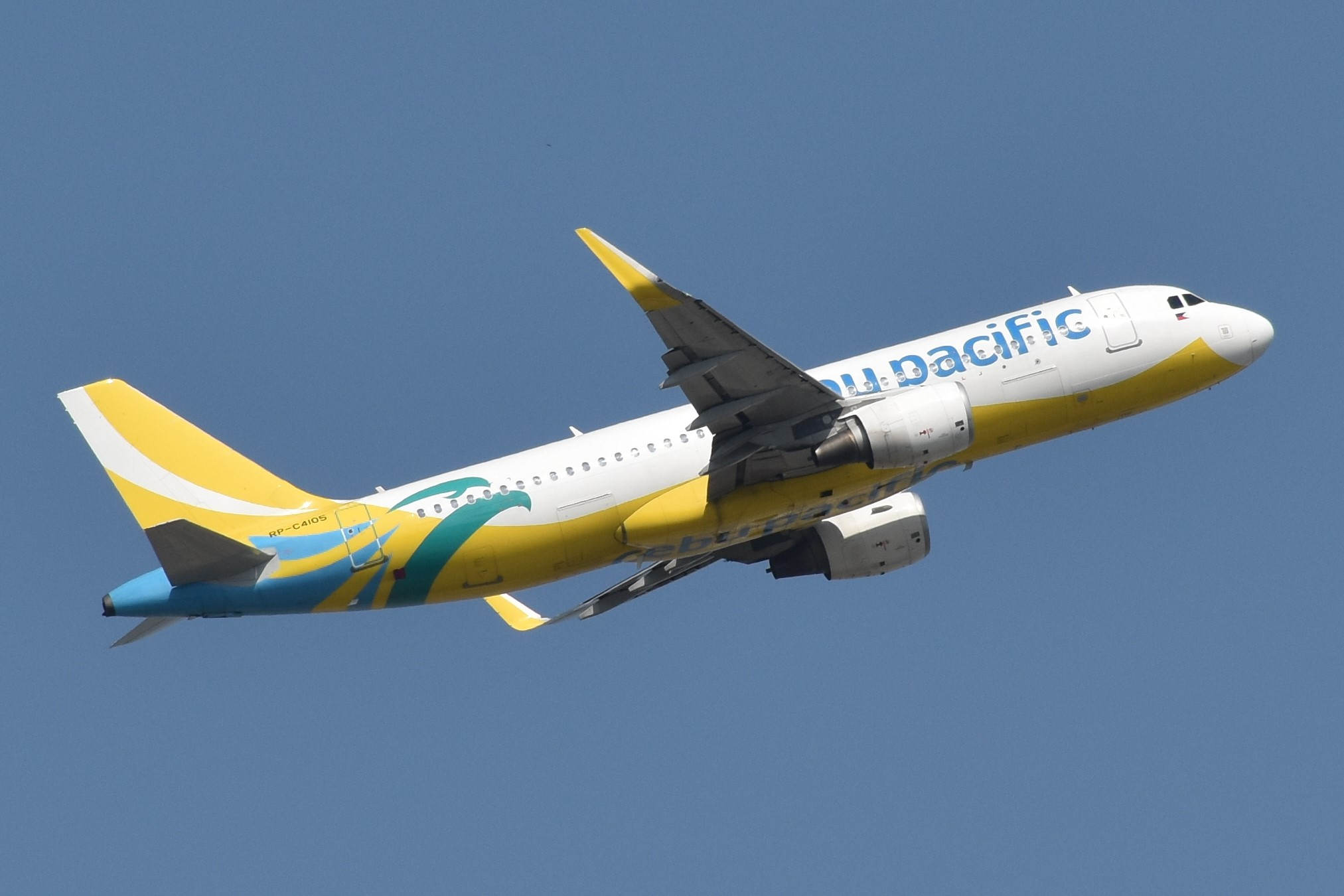
Airbus A320-200

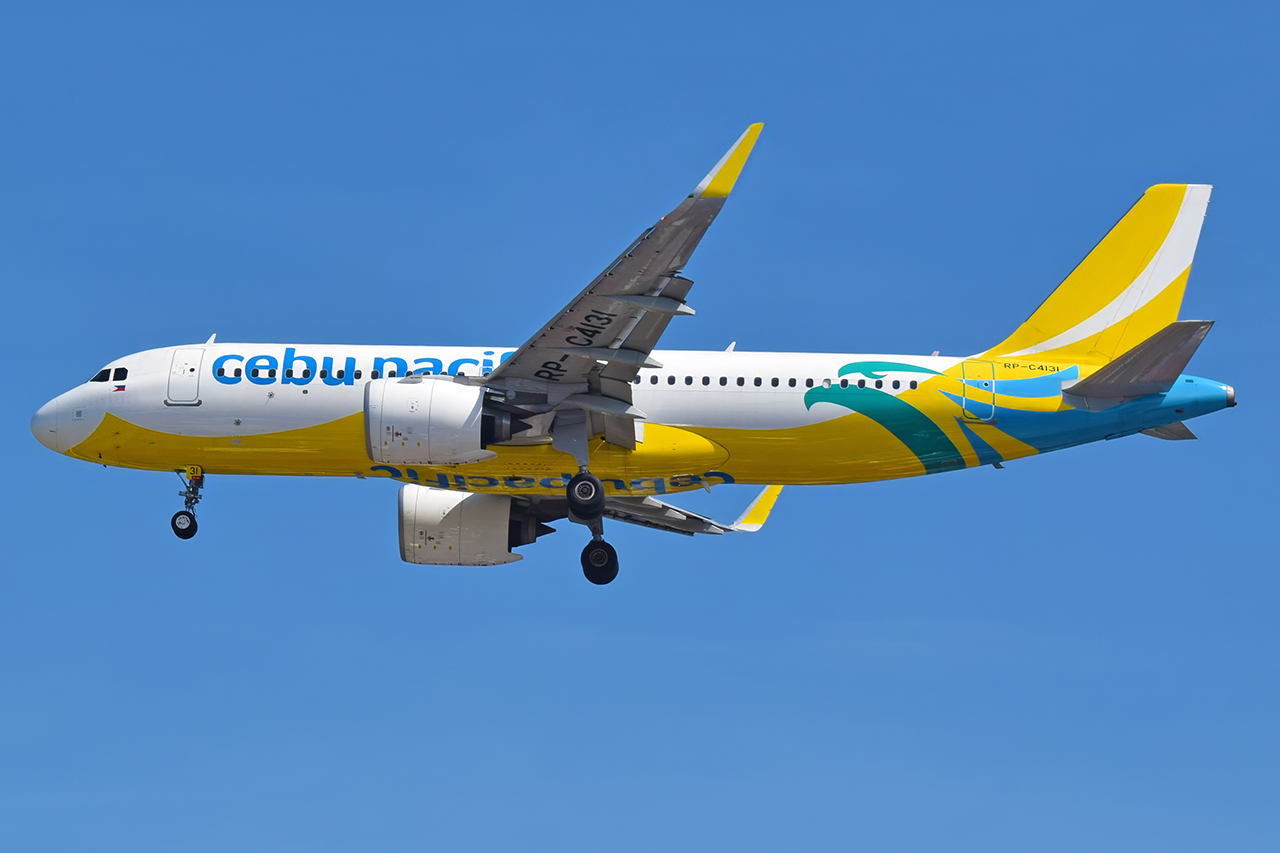
Airbus A320neo

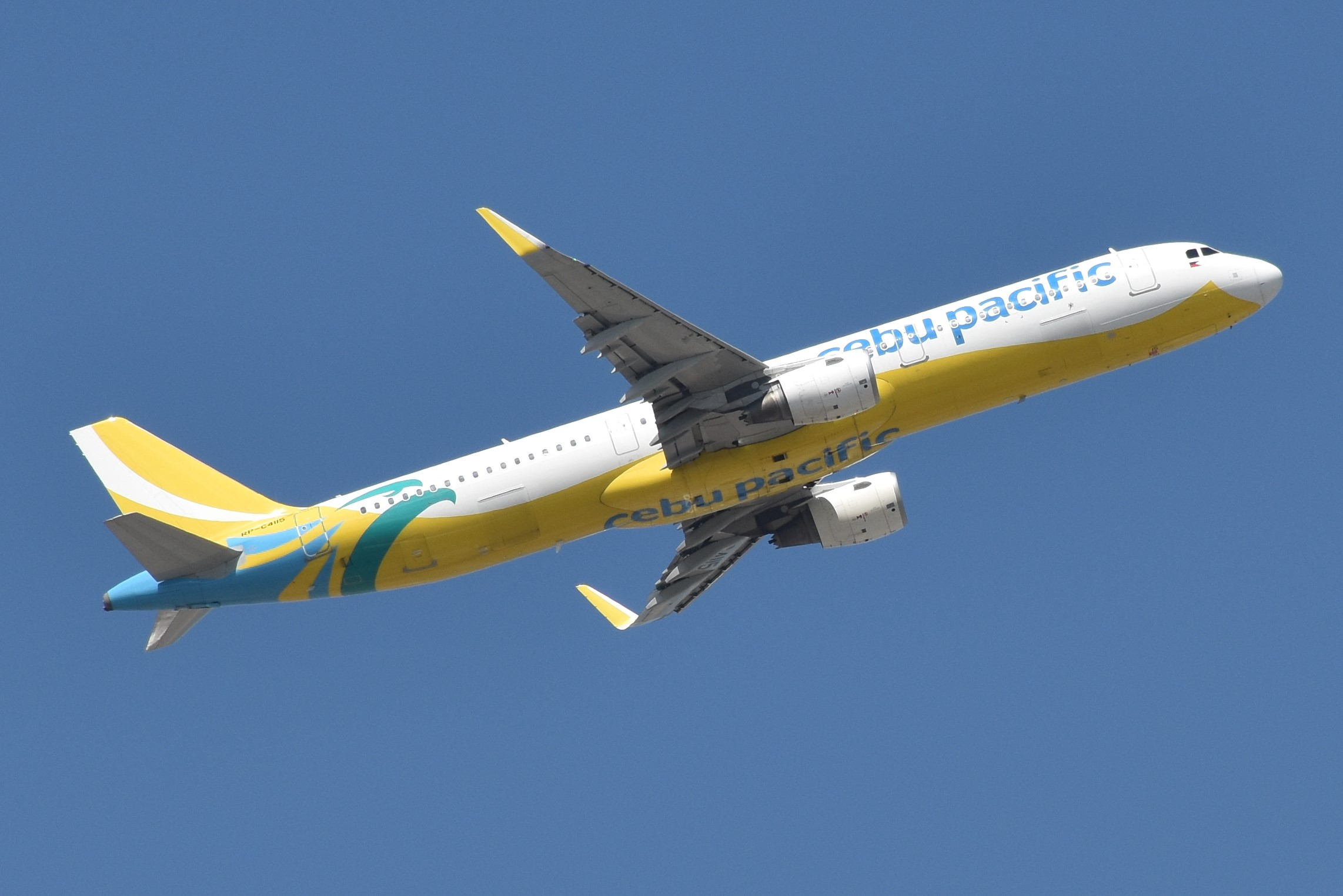
Airbus A321-200

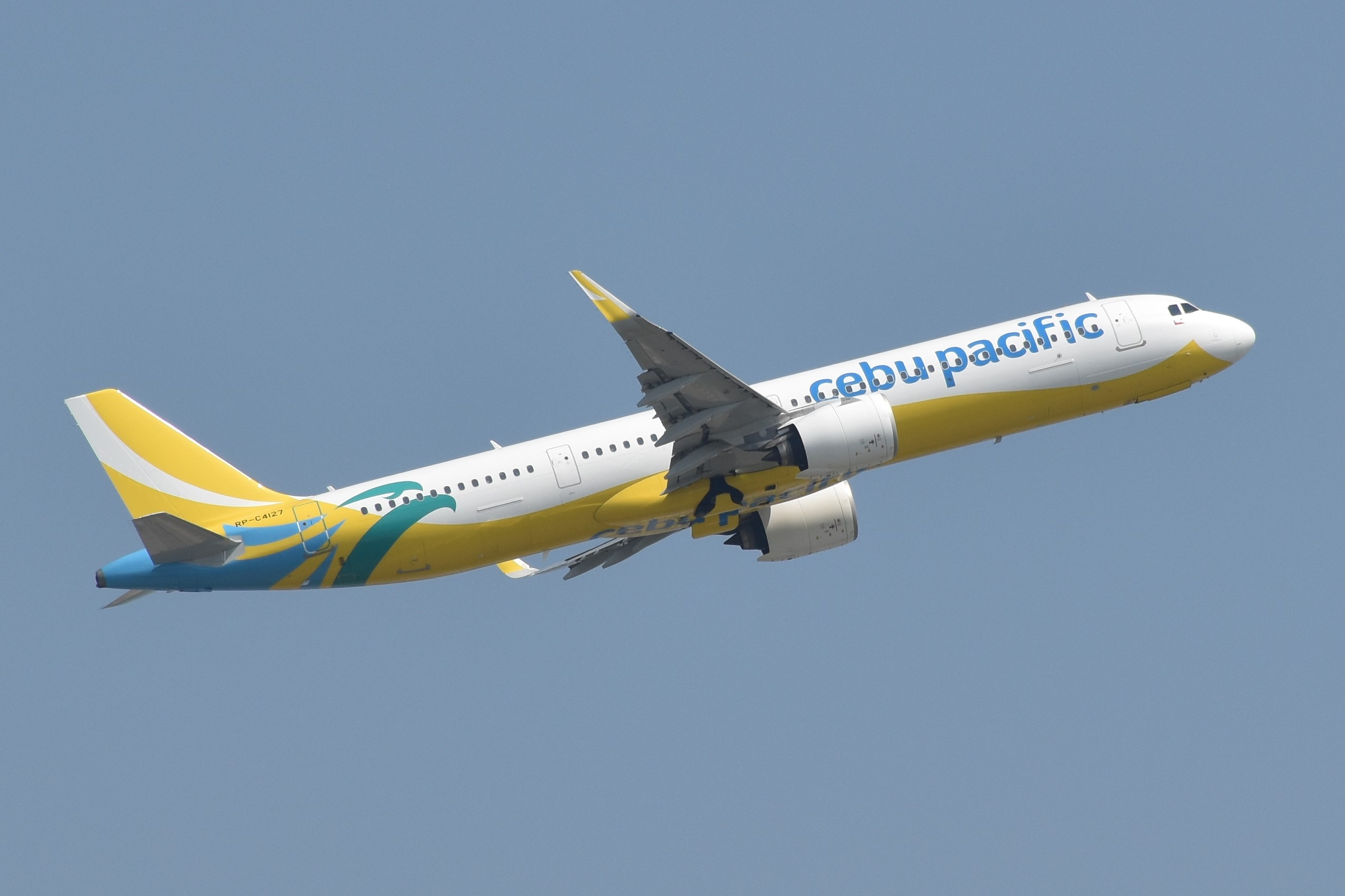
Airbus A321neo

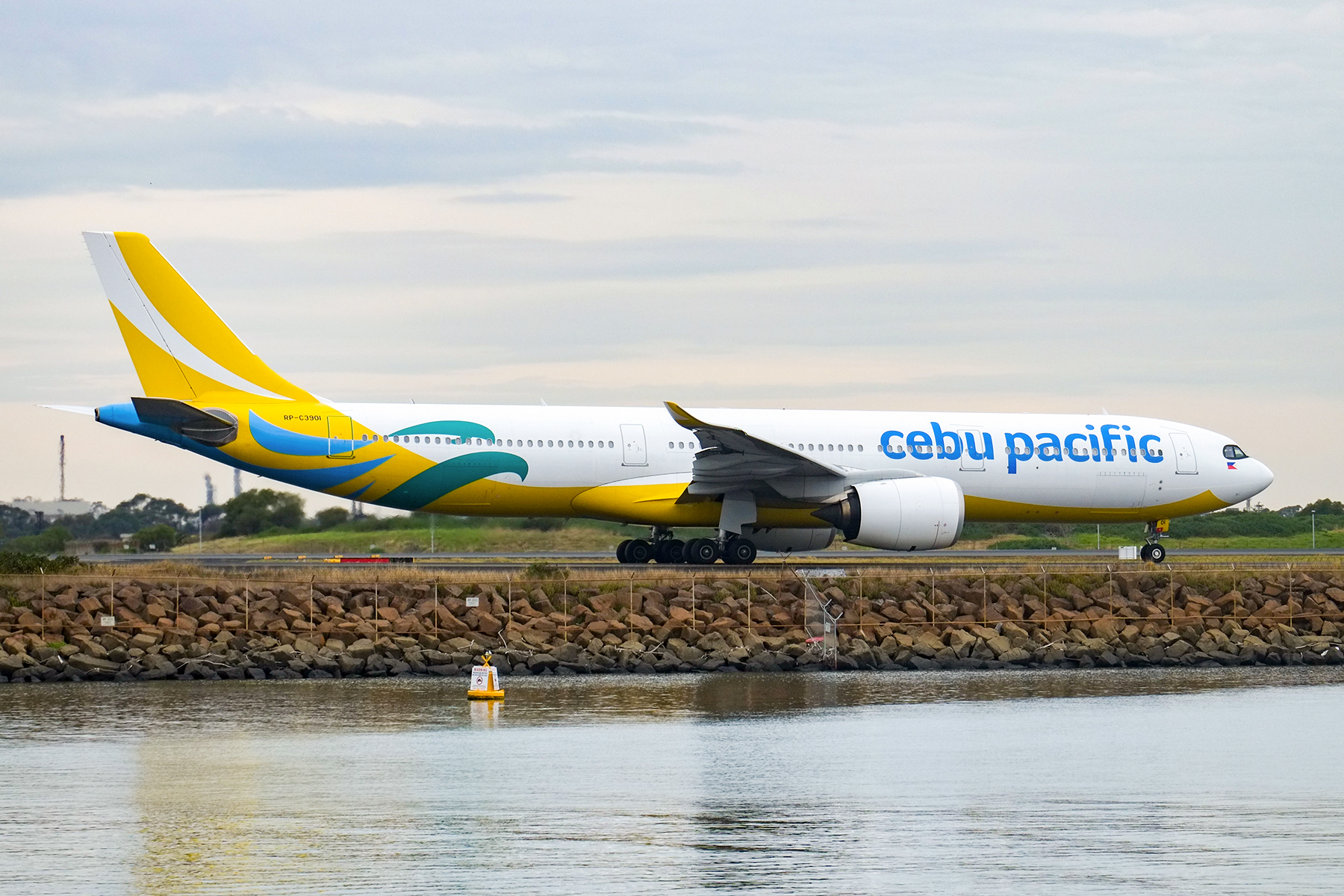
Airbus A330-900

=== Fleet development ===
Cebu Pacific initially operated a fleet of the Boeing 757-200 and McDonnell Douglas DC-9 aircraft. On July 26, 2006, Cebu Pacific retired its last DC-9, while on July 31, 2006, Cebu Pacific phased out and retired its Boeing 757-200s.

In September 2004, Cebu Pacific signed a purchase agreement with Airbus for the acquisition of twelve A319s and the lease of two A320s to replace its existing fleet of Boeing 757-200 and McDonnell Douglas DC-9 aircraft. It selected the CFM56 engine for its Airbus aircraft. It took delivery of its first A320-200 in May 2005. The airline went on to order more A320s in the following years, raising its total orders to twenty-two by 2010. The A320s supported the airline's expanding international and domestic operations.

Turboprops were introduced to the fleet in 2007, when Cebu Pacific ordered six ATR 72-500 turboprop aircraft for its regional domestic flights. By 2015, these were transferred to its regional subsidiary Cebgo, with Cebu Pacific operating mainly jet aircraft.

In 2007, the airline ordered six Airbus A330-300s for use on long-haul Middle Eastern destinations such as Dubai as well as high-density regional flights. Cebu Pacific received its first A330-300 on June 15, 2013. In 2016, the carrier ordered two more A330s to complement earlier fleet in operating new long-haul routes, such as Sydney and Melbourne.

In June 2011, Cebu Pacific ordered 30 Airbus A321neos including nine leased; the deal was finalized in August. After initial deliveries in 2017 were delayed due to problems with the Pratt & Whitney PW1100G-JM geared turbofan engines, it ordered seven A321-200s on June 7, 2017. Cebu Pacific took delivery of its first A321ceo on March 22, 2018, followed by its first A321neo on January 20, 2019.

In July 2018, Cebu Pacific leased five Airbus A320neos from Avolon; the first of which was delivered in June 2019.

On June 18, 2019, Cebu Pacific ordered 31 Airbus aircraft at that year's Paris Air Show, consisting of five A320neos, sixteen A330-900s, and ten A321XLRs, in a deal worth US$6.8 billion at list prices. This makes the airline as one of the few launch customers of the long-range narrow-body Airbus A321XLR aircraft. These were ordered as part of its fleet modernization, seeking to replace its older fleet with newer, fuel-efficient aircraft. It took delivery of its first A330neo on November 28, 2021.

On June 30, 2023, the airline took delivery of its first Airbus plane assembled in China — an A320neo built at its final assembly line at Tianjin Binhai International Airport, leased from Clover Aviation Capital.

To prepare for the anticipated doubling of travel demand in Southeast Asia, Cebu Pacific sent requests for proposals to Airbus and Boeing in October 2023 for an order 100 to 150 aircraft. Amid supply chain problems causing delivery delays of Airbus aircraft and the engine problems of Pratt & Whitney, Cebu Pacific considered ordering the Boeing 737 MAX to augment its existing A320 family fleet. Nevertheless, on July 2, 2024, it signed a memorandum of understanding (MoU) with Airbus to purchase up to 152 A320neo family aircraft. Worth US$24 billion at list prices, the order is the largest in Philippine aviation history. Eventually, Cebu Pacific placed 70 firm orders for the A321neo on October 2, leaving the remaining 82 as options.

From January to May 2024, Cebu Pacific damp-leased two A320-200s from Bulgaria Air for use on domestic flights to Cebu and Davao City to offset the grounding of its A320neo family aircraft.

=== Former fleet ===
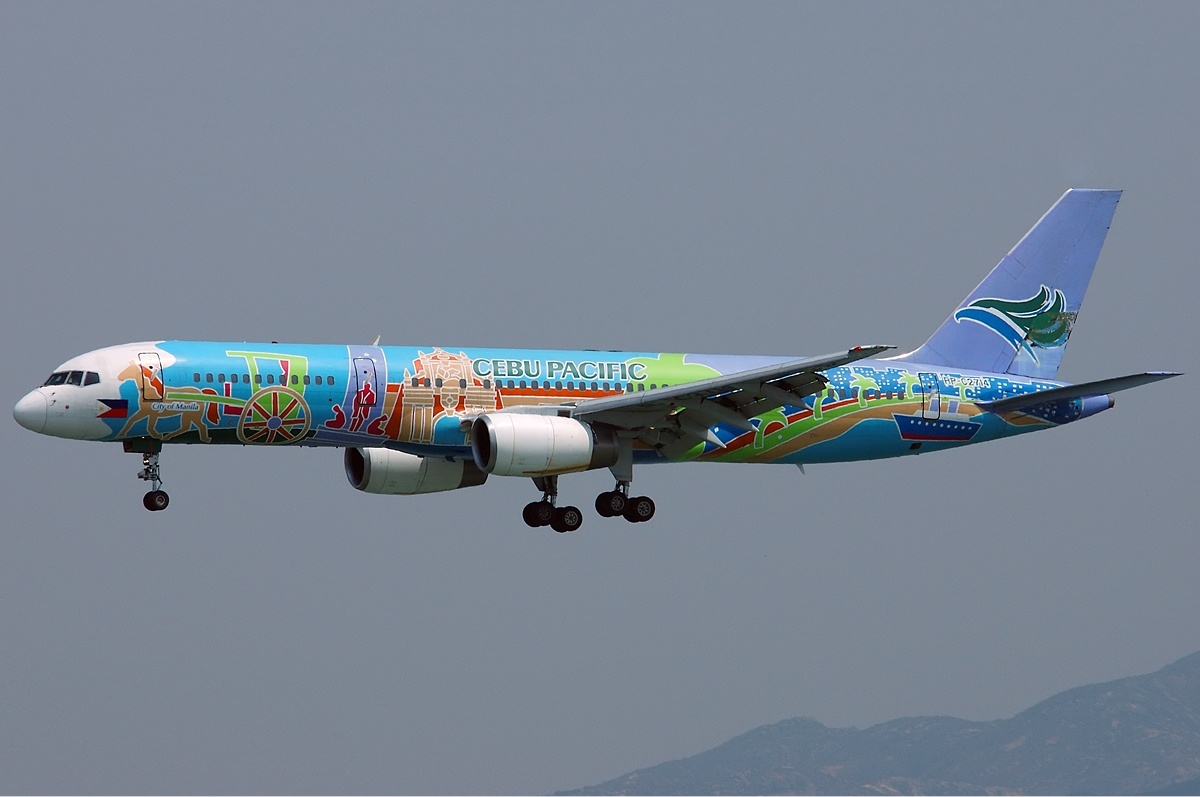
Boeing 757-200

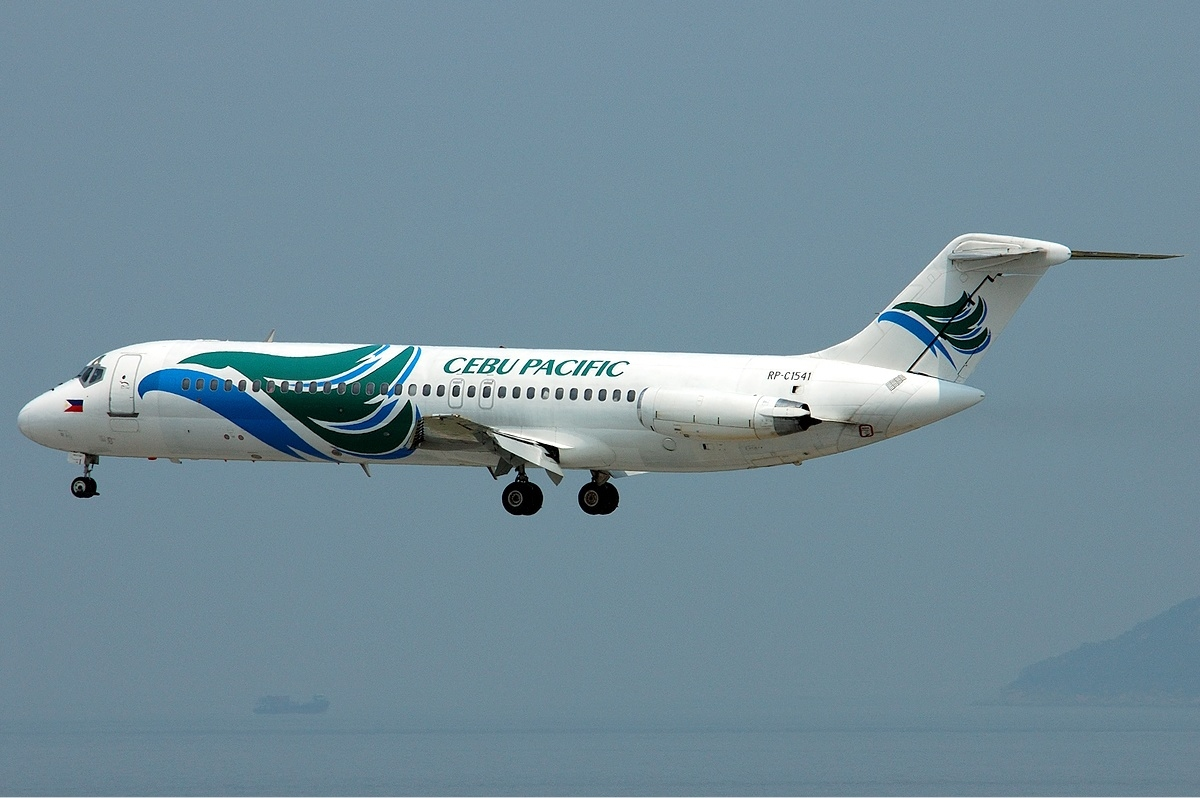
McDonnell Douglas DC-9-30

Cebu Pacific retired fleet
Aircraft	Total	Introduced	Retired	Replacement	Notes	Refs
Airbus A319-100	10	2005	2018	Airbus A320neo family	Sold to Allegiant Air.	
Airbus A330-300	8	2013	2024	Airbus A330-900	Sold to multiple airlines.	
ATR 72-500	6	2008	2015	None	Transferred to Cebgo.	
Boeing 757-200	3	2000	2006	Airbus A320-200		
McDonnell Douglas DC-9-32	19	1996	2006	Airbus A319	One crashed as Flight 387.	

== Passenger complaints and investigation ==
Cebu Pacific has been criticized for its poor passenger service, alleged (but industry-standard) overbooking, as well as flight delays and cancellations without any verifiable reason. It eventually led to a resolution filed by Senator Nancy Binay on April 23, 2023, following the aftermath of the airline's "Super Pass" voucher sale. In the Senate hearing on June 21, Binay compiled over 3,000 complaints against Cebu Pacific, including offloaded passengers, as well as several delayed, cancelled, or rescheduled flights with unclear or no explanations; some of the complainants were allegedly not given compensation for the delays. The airline blamed on supply chain issues and grounded aircraft as a result of the disruptions, and apologized to affected passengers. Rufus Rodriguez, representative of Cagayan de Oro's 2nd congressional district also filed a resolution that would suspend Cebu Pacific's franchise.

== Accidents and incidents ==
- February 2, 1998: Cebu Pacific Flight 387, a McDonnell Douglas DC-9-30 registered as RP-C1507 flying from Manila to Cagayan de Oro crashed on the slopes of Mount Sumagaya in Misamis Oriental, killing all 104 people on board during its approach to Lumbia Airport.
- July 18, 2010: Cebu Pacific Flight 509, an ATR 72-500 registered as RP-C7254 bounced while landing at Manila after a flight from Tuguegarao Airport. The pilots performed a go-around and discovered that they could not retract the landing gear. The plane made a priority landing on runway 13. The aircraft (RP-C7254) was declared a hull loss.
- June 2, 2013: Cebu Pacific Flight 971, an Airbus A320-200 registered as RP-C3266 and carrying 165 passengers inbound from Manila, ran off the runway at Francisco Bangoy International Airport and investigators have found the cause was likely human error. There were no fatalities, however, the plane was heavily damaged. The airline received criticism for its handling of the incident; passengers waited inside the plane for twenty-seven minutes before being evacuated. In 2014, the plane returned to service after six months of repairs and maintenance checks.
- August 4, 2017: Cebu Pacific Flight 570, an Airbus A330-300 registered as RP-C3341, due to a nose gear fault, went off the runway stopping on soft ground while taxiing for departure at Mactan–Cebu International Airport. There were no injuries, however, the aircraft incurred minor damage. The runway was closed until the aircraft was moved back on to a paved surface. It was rated as an Incident by CAAP and is under investigation.
- October 13, 2017: Cebu Pacific Flight 461, an Airbus A320-200 registered as RP-C3237 veered to the side of the runway at Iloilo International Airport. No injuries were reported.
- April 23, 2018: Cebu Pacific Flight 849, an Airbus A320-200 registered as RP-C4105 flew from Manila to Zamboanga with 172 people on board, safely landed on Zamboanga International Airport's runway and was about to turn around at the turning pad at the end of the runway when the flight crew stopped the maneuver due to a nose gear steering fault. The entire airport was closed for about three hours until the aircraft could be moved to the apron.

== See also ==
- List of airlines of the Philippines
- List of airports in the Philippines
- List of companies of the Philippines
- List of low-cost airlines
- Transportation in the Philippines
