= Godofredo Juliano Air Base =

Military airport in Cagayan de Oro, Misamis Oriental, Philippines

Colonel Godofredo Juliano Air Base
- Part of Philippine Air Force
- Barangay Lumbia, Cagayan de Oro, Philippines

Site information
- Type: Air Base
- Owner: Philippines
- Controlled by: Philippine Air Force; United States Air Force (under jurisdiction of Enhanced Defense Cooperation Agreement)
- Condition: active, as of 2013

Location
- Coordinates: 08°24′56″N 124°36′40″E

Site history
- Built: 1930s
- In use: Philippines

Garrison information
- Garrison: 15th Strike Wing

Lumbia Airfield Tugpahanang Militar sa Lumbia
- IATA: none; ICAO: RPML; WMO: 98747

Summary
- Airport type: Military
- Operator: Philippine Air Force
- Serves: Cagayan de Oro
- Location: Barangay Lumbia, Cagayan de Oro, Misamis Oriental
- Elevation AMSL: 183 m (600 ft)
- Coordinates: 08°24′56″N 124°36′40″E

Map
- Location in the Philippines

Runways
| Direction | Length | | Surface |
| Direction | m | ft | Surface |
|---|---|---|---|
| 01/19 | 2,454 | 8,050 | Asphalt |

Statistics (2011)
- Passengers: 1,442,959
- Aircraft movements: 6,792
- Tonnes of cargo: 16,166
- 2012 Philippine Statistical Yearbook

Colonel Godofredo Juliano Air Base (ICAO: RPML), commonly referred to as Lumbia Air Base and formerly known as Lumbia Airport, Lumbia Airfield and Cagayan de Oro Airport, is an air base and was the main civilian airport that served the general areas of Cagayan de Oro and Northern Mindanao, in the province of Misamis Oriental in the Philippines. It was the second busiest airport in Mindanao, after Francisco Bangoy International Airport in Davao City before the opening of Laguindingan Airport.

It was classified as a Class 1 principal (major domestic) airport by the Civil Aviation Authority of the Philippines, a body of the Department of Transportation that is responsible for the operations airports in the Philippines (except major international ones).

Lumbia Airfield took its name from its location in Barangay Lumbia. It now serves as a minor air base of the Philippine Air Force, with service equipment of OV-10 Bronco aircraft as well as UH-1 Huey and MD-520MG Defender helicopters.

On June 15, 2013, Laguindingan Airport in the municipality of Laguindingan, Misamis Oriental, some 46 kilometers (29 mi) northwest of the city, replaced Lumbia Airport. The new airport serves Northern Mindanao, as well as its major cities, Iligan and Cagayan de Oro.

== History ==
Lumbia Airfield was opened in the 1930s during the American occupation of the Philippines. In World War II, the Japanese controlled the airstrip, with the runway being extended by the use of forced labor.

It remained as Cagayan de Oro's only airport, as the city grew in size and population. However, it came to the point where Lumbia airport could no longer keep up with CDO's rapid growth. Additionally, its higher elevation above the city meant that many flights had to divert during rain or thick fog.

Before the last flight, the passengers are limited and the other airline's check-in and drop-off counters were closed. Only Philippine Airlines and Cebu Pacific check-in and drop-off counters were left open. Arrivals began closing in 21:30 (11:30 PM) on June 14.

On June 14, 2013, at 22:00 (10:00 PM) local time, the last commercial passenger flight departed the former Lumbia Airport, signalling the end of a chapter in Philippine aviation history. The IATA code CGY was reassigned to Laguindingan Airport.

After the last flight, the stores owned by owners were rapidly stripped out and moved to other places in Misamis Oriental and the all security screening equipment were moved and transferred to Laguindingan Airport. Construction workers and engineers stripped out the stores and office quarters for use by military offices and bedrooms.

== As a military air base ==
It is now under control of the 590th Air Base Group of the Philippine Air Force. The airport has been selected by the US military for building their facilities under the Enhanced Defense Cooperation Agreement.

In February 2017, the Philippine Air Force began relocating to the airport.

In 2026, the Lumbia Air Base was renamed as Colonel Godofredo Juliano Air Base in honor of Godofredo Juliano, who served with the famed 6th Pursuit Squadron and fought Japanese Mitsubishi A6M Zero fighters during World War II. For his bravery, he received the Gold Cross from Douglas MacArthur. He later became the first commander of the 1st Fighter Squadron on May 1, 1946, while holding the rank of Captain.

== Accidents and incidents ==
On February 2, 1998, Cebu Pacific Flight 387 from Ninoy Aquino International Airport in Manila to Cagayan de Oro, flown by a McDonnell Douglas DC-9-30 (registered as RP-C1507), crashed into Mount Sumagaya in Claveria, Misamis Oriental, killing all 99 passengers and 5 crew on board. The cause of the crash was blamed on a number of factors: pilot error, an unusual flight route (due to an unscheduled stopover in Tacloban to deliver aircraft parts for another Cebu Pacific DC-9), bad weather, and incorrect air charts.

On May 28, 2022, a Philippine Air Force Hermes 900 unmanned aerial vehicle crash-landed while it was about to land at the airfield.

== See also ==
- Laguindingan Airport
