= World Elijah Evangelical Mission =

Chinese Christian group

- Classification: Christian new religious movement
- Region: People's Republic of China
- Language: Standard Chinese, Korean
- Founder: Park Myung Hoo
- Origin: 1980; China
- Members: over a thousand
- Other name: Elijah's Ten Commandments Stone Country Korean Farmers

The World Elijah Evangelical Mission (now known as Elijah's Ten Commandments Stone Country Korean Farmers) was the operating title in China of the South Korean new religious movement Doalnara founded in 1980 by a Korean man named Park Myung Ho (朴鳴呼), with five levels of membership: God, Angel, General Secretary, Chief, and Director. It had a presence in Zhejiang, Anhui, Shandong, Henan, and 11 other Provinces, Autonomous regions, Direct-controlled municipality. It was centered in Northeast China and established its own state within a state commune network called the Stone Kingdom until its abolition in 1999.

It had more than a thousand members at its peak.

World Elijah Evangelical Mission

World Elijah Evangelical Mission
- Traditional Chinese: 世界以利亞福音宣教會
- Simplified Chinese: 世界以利亚福音宣教会
Transcriptions
Standard Mandarin
- Hanyu Pinyin: Shìjiè yǐ lì yǎ fúyīn xuānjiào huì

Elijah's Ten Commandments Stone Country Korean Farmers
- Chinese: 以利亞十誡石國韓農复救會
- Traditional Chinese: 以利亞十誡石國韓農複救會
Transcriptions
Standard Mandarin
- Hanyu Pinyin: Yǐ lì yǎ shíjiè shíguóhán nóng fù jiù huì

Elijah Ten Commandments Stone Kingdom
- Chinese: 以利亚十诫石国
- Traditional Chinese: 以利亞十誡石國
Transcriptions
Standard Mandarin
- Hanyu Pinyin: Yǐ lì yǎ shíjiè shí guó

== Development ==
Park called himself the last prophet "Elijah", asked his followers to worship him as a "Stone Immortal", called the World Elijah Mission a "Stone Kingdom", and created the constitution, national flag, and National anthem; declared that "the end of the world will come in the year 2000, and on September 30, 1997, Elijah will stand as God in the world", and proclaimed that he would "smash and destroy all nations".

The World Elijah Mission invested a large amount of money to carry out propaganda activities in China, and established more than 20 meeting points and contact points in various places, and rented land to build eight "Stone Kingdom" villages, where more than 600 believers sold their family property and moved their families to live together. In the "Stone Kingdom" villages, founder Myung Ho asked the believers to cut off all contact with the outside world, to focus on the doctrine of the World Elijah Evangelical Mission, to refrain from reading newspaper, watching TV, and listening to broadcast, and to "Absolute obedience to the call to complete the historical mission of establishing the Stone Kingdom system in China and bringing down the Chinese Communist Party system". Under the propaganda of the World Elijah Mission, more than a thousand Koreans and Han Chinese from the three northeastern provinces (Liaoning, Jilin, and Heilongjiang) joined the World Elijah Mission, and many of them sold all their family properties and moved to the "Stone Kingdom".

It registered as a church in Taiwan on February 15, 1983.

== Qualitative ==
On March 19, 1996, the Ministry of Public Security of the People's Republic of China clearly identified the "World Elijah Mission" as a cult in a special report to the Central leadership, "Jilin Province Public Security Authorities Investigate and Deal with the Infiltration Activities of the Korean Cult "World Elijah Mission"".

== Stone Kingdom ==
The Elijah Ten Commandments Stone Kingdom, referred to as the Stone Kingdom, is also known as the Cosmic Kingdom of the Ten Commandments of Heaven was the state within a state established by the World Elijah Evangelical Mission in Northeast China.

=== History ===
The World Elijah Evangelical Mission was founded by Korean Park Myung Ho in 1980 (later renamed as Elijah's Ten Commandments Stone Country Korean Farmers) has been operating in mainland China since 1993, covering Since its introduction into mainland China in 1993, the activities of the Elijah Ten Commandments Shikoku Hanon Restoration Society have involved 11 provinces, autonomous regions, and municipalities directly under the Central Government, including the Eastern provinces.

The organization also invested a large amount of money to infiltrate China, establishing more than 20 meeting points and contact points in various places, and renting land to build eight "Stone Kingdom" villages, calling on a total of more than 600 believers to sell their family assets and move their families to the villages to live collectively, and using the villages as a base to build The "Stone Kingdom" (country within a country) was established on the basis of the village. They are forbidden to read newspapers, watch TV, listen to radio, made to cut off all contact with the outside world, and children are forbidden to go to school. The most important daily lesson is to study the doctrine, pray, repent, and reflect on whether they are loyal to the Lord.
