= Claveria, Misamis Oriental =

Municipality in Misamis Oriental, Philippines

Claveria
- Municipality
- Municipality of Claveria
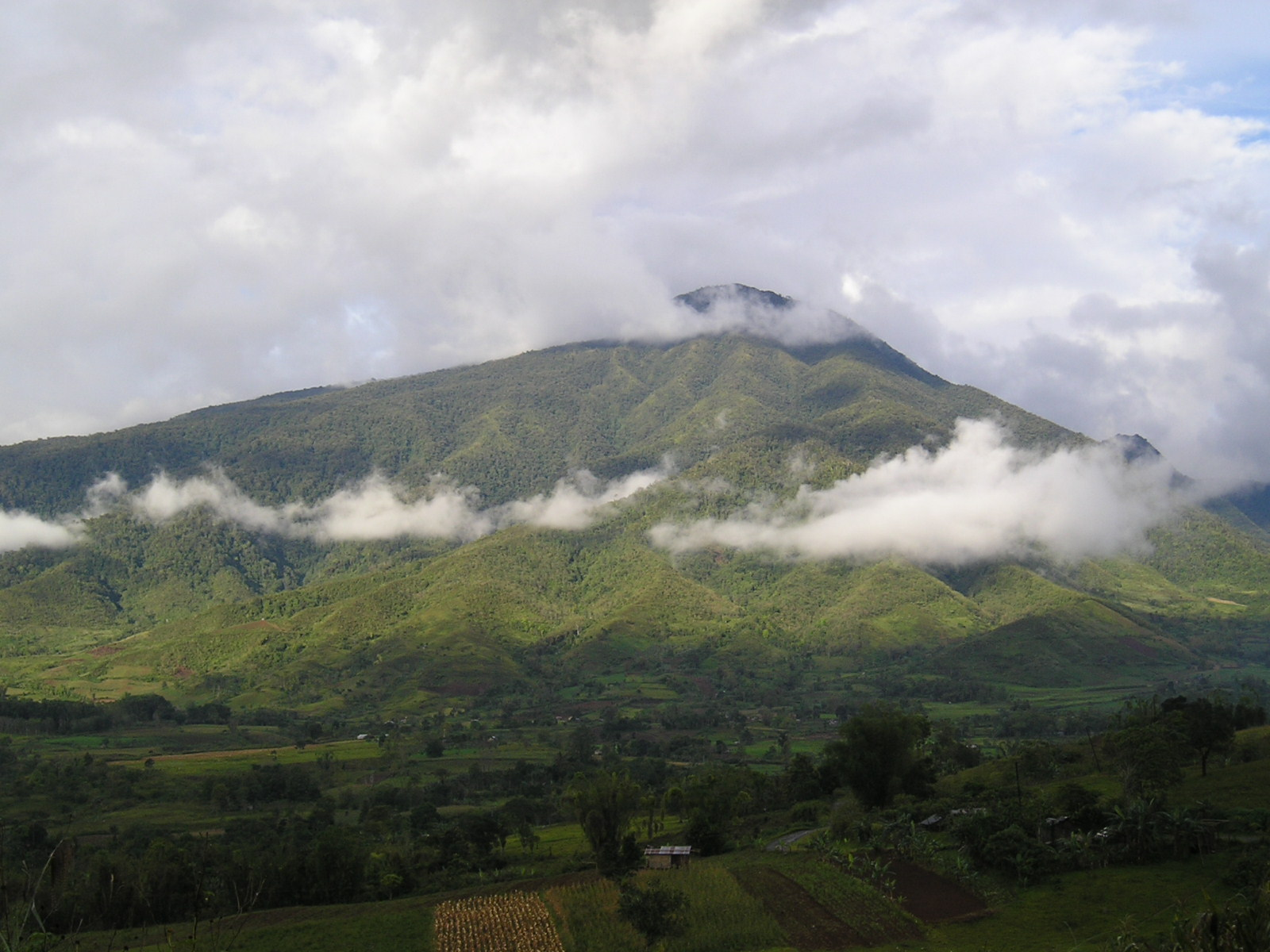
- Mount Sumagaya

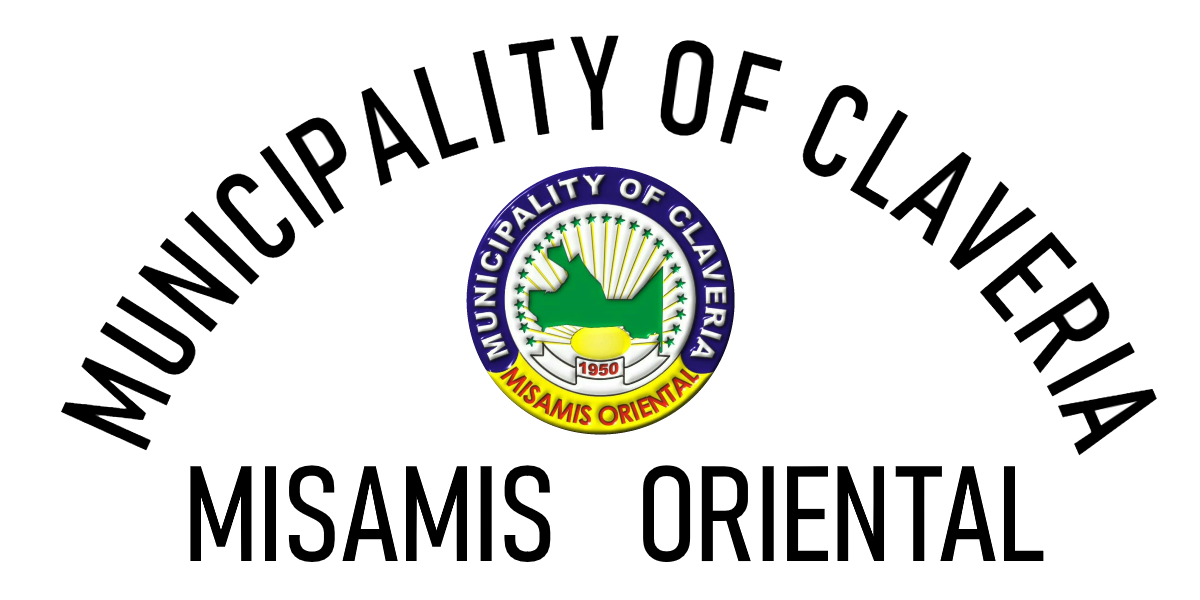
- Flag

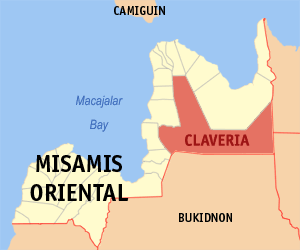
- Map of Misamis Oriental with Claveria highlighted
- Interactive map of Claveria
- Location within the Philippines
- Coordinates: 8°36′36″N 124°53′41″E
- Country: Philippines
- Region: Northern Mindanao
- Province: Misamis Oriental
- District: 2nd district
- Founded: July 22, 1950
- Barangays: 24 (see Barangays)

Government
  - Type: Sangguniang Bayan
  - Mayor: Reynante L.Salvaleon
  - Vice Mayor: Alfred Azcuna
  - Representative: Yevgeny Vincente B. Emano
  - Municipal Council: Members: Cesar F. Escoro; Ricardo Richard C. dela Cruz; Gerardo D. Barros; Verano V. Caabay; Magdalena V. Dumaluan; Alfred A. Azcuna; Joecard Y. Dalman; Marcelo B. Dalen
  - Electorate: 38,484 voters (2025)

Area
  - Total: 579.63 km^{2} (223.80 sq mi)
- Elevation: 657 m (2,156 ft)
- Highest elevation: 955 m (3,133 ft)
- Lowest elevation: 288 m (945 ft)

Population (2024 census)
  - Total: 52,718
  - Density: 90.951/km^{2} (235.56/sq mi)
  - Households: 12,595

Economy
  - Income class: 1st municipal income class
  - Poverty incidence: 29.73% (2023)
  - Revenue: ₱ 368.1 million (2024)
  - Assets: ₱ 1,991 million (2024)
  - Expenditure: ₱ 355.7 million (2024)
  - Liabilities: ₱ 319.2 million (2024)

Service provider
  - Electricity: Misamis Oriental 2 Rural Electric Cooperative (MORESCO 2)
- Time zone: UTC+8 (PST)
- ZIP code: 9004
- PSGC: 1004306000
- IDD : area code: +63 (0)88
- Native languages: Cebuano; Binukid; Subanon; Tagalog
- Website: www.claveriamisor.gov.ph

Claveria, officially the Municipality of Claveria (Cebuano: Lungsod sa Claveria; Tagalog: Bayan ng Claveria), is a municipality in the province of Misamis Oriental, Philippines. According to the 2024 census, it has a population of 52,718 people.

It is the only landlocked municipality of Misamis Oriental as well as the largest in terms of land area in the province.

== History ==
The town was once named Tikala, a native term for “wonder”. Tikala was once ruled by Datu Manlumupog, a warrior of the native aborigines known as the “Higaunons”, meaning people of the land. The Higaunons observed simple living but with high regard to nature. For them, the vast and rich environment they have means life to them and this is manifested by their unique datu system, e.g., Datu for Agriculture – Igbabasuk; Datu for Hunting – Panumanud; Datu for water respect – Bulalakaw, etc. Despite the simple way of life, they were kept united by their Sacred Code named as Bungkatel Ha Bulawan, which under its teaching, land is a gift from the supreme creator for all men, the Magbabaya. Land is life, thus, must be taken care of under the stewardship of the great, great-great ancestors whose spirits continue to keep watching over it so it could be used for generation to generation.

In 1912, a Spanish Jesuit missionary and the curate of Jasaan named Fr. Juan Yras came over the place and renamed Tikala to Claveria in honor of the Spanish Governor-General of the Philippines Don Narciso Claveria y Zaldua.

Politically, Claveria was under the Municipal District of the province of Bukidnon. Upon the passage of an Act No. 2968, otherwise known as the Artadi Law, it was separated from Bukidnon and was ceded to the province of Misamis Oriental on February 21, 1921, under the administrative control of the Municipal District of Balingasag (MPDC LGU Claveria).

Claveria attained its stature as an independent municipality of the province of Misamis Oriental on July 22, 1950, by virtue of the Executive Order (E.O.) No. 334 issued by then President Elpidio Quirino.

On February 2, 1998, Cebu Pacific Flight 387 crashed on the slopes of Mount Sumagaya, a 2,248-meter mountain under the jurisdiction of Claveria. All 104 people aboard the plane were killed.

== Geography ==
It is bounded by a series of coastal towns and a component city. From Villanueva to Gingoog to the north, north-west, and west; Bukidnon to the south; and Agusan del Norte to the east. The municipality can be accessed via public transportation (Van-for-Hires, Jeepneys) from the province's capital, Cagayan de Oro. It will take an hour to commute to get in the town's Poblacion.

Claveria is the largest among the 23 towns of Misamis Oriental comprising one-third of the total land area of the province. The current total land area of the municipality measures 825 km^{2} as per 2006 data reduced from its original of 894.90 km^{2} base from 1990 records. Territorial land dispute has been claimed by several neighboring areas such as the city of Gingoog, towns of Balingasag, Villanueva, Jasaan, and Malitbog of Bukidnon.

=== Barangays ===
Claveria is politically subdivided into 24 barangays. Each barangay consists of puroks while some have sitios.

- Ani-e
- Aposkahoy
- Bulahan
- Cabacungan
- D.G. Pelaez
- Gumaod
- Hinaplanan
- Kalawitan
- Lanise
- Luna
- Madaguing
- Malagana
- Minalwang
- Mat-I
- Panampawan
- Parmbugas
- Patrocinio
- Plaridel
- Poblacion
- Punong
- Rizal
- Santa Cruz
- Tamboboan
- Tipolohon

=== Topography ===
The town has a generally rugged topography, characterized by gently rolling hills and mountains with cliffs and escarpments. The soil is classified as Jasaan clay, with a deep soil profile (greater than 1 m) and rapid drainage. It is generally acidic (pH 3.9 to 5.2), with low cation exchange capacity (CEC), low to moderate organic matter content (1.8%), high aluminium saturation, and low levels of available phosphorus and exchangeable potassium.

=== Climate ===
Claveria has a rainfall distribution of five or six wet months (>200 mm/month) and two or three dry months (<100 mm/month). Rainfall patterns throughout the municipality vary with elevation, with the upper areas having a relatively greater amount of rainfall than the lower areas. The rainfall pattern strongly influences cropping patterns and land use across Claveria's landscape. Naturally the town is the only municipality of the province which has a cooler temperature ranging below 22 degrees Celsius in as much as 16 degrees Celsius and lower in the higher areas.

Climate data for Claveria, Misamis Oriental
Month	Jan	Feb	Mar	Apr	May	Jun	Jul	Aug	Sep	Oct	Nov	Dec	Year
Mean daily maximum °C (°F)	23 (73)	24 (75)	25 (77)	26 (79)	26 (79)	25 (77)	25 (77)	26 (79)	26 (79)	25 (77)	25 (77)	24 (75)	25 (77)
Mean daily minimum °C (°F)	19 (66)	19 (66)	19 (66)	19 (66)	20 (68)	21 (70)	21 (70)	21 (70)	21 (70)	21 (70)	20 (68)	20 (68)	20 (68)
Average precipitation mm (inches)	327 (12.9)	254 (10.0)	185 (7.3)	128 (5.0)	215 (8.5)	273 (10.7)	248 (9.8)	243 (9.6)	214 (8.4)	246 (9.7)	271 (10.7)	271 (10.7)	2,875 (113.3)
Average rainy days	24.3	21.1	22.5	20.6	28.3	28.8	29.4	29.0	28.0	28.3	26.0	24.2	310.5
Source: Meteoblue (modeled/calculated data, not measured locally)

== Demographics ==
=== Population ===
Population census of Claveria

Year	Pop.	±% p.a.
1918	2,025	—
1939	12,939	+9.23%
1948	26,330	+8.21%
1960	14,281	−4.97%
1970	16,816	+1.65%
1975	23,363	+6.82%
1980	29,088	+4.48%
1990	31,130	+0.68%

Year	Pop.	±% p.a.
1995	39,020	+4.32%
2000	41,109	+1.12%
2007	43,514	+0.79%
2010	44,544	+0.86%
2015	48,906	+1.80%
2020	52,478	+1.49%
2024	52,718	+0.11%

Source: Philippine Statistics Authority

In the 2024 census, the population of Claveria was 52,718 people, with a density of 91 inhabitants per square kilometre or 240 inhabitants per square mile.

Population of Claveria by barangay
Name of Barangay	2007 census	2010 census
Ani-e	3,198	3,083
Aposkahoy	2,402	2,280
Bulahan	1,311	1,179
Cabacungan	1,308	1,398
Pelaez (Don Gregorio Pelaez)	862	912
Gumaod	1,248	1,384
Hinaplanan	2,857	2,930
Kalawitan	423	530
Lanise	2,087	2,071
Luna	1,519	1,506
Madaguing	901	952
Malagana	2,157	2,346
Minalwang	1,722	1,578
Mat-i	3,074	3,223
Panampawan	630	678
Pambugas	765	812
Patrocinio	3,084	2,870
Plaridel	1,592	1,601
Poblacion	7,685	8,747
Punong	504	598
Rizal	974	932
Santa Cruz	1,179	1,129
Tamboboan	1,278	1,129
Tipolohon	704	637
Total	43,514	44,544

=== Ethnicities and language ===
Although the original inhabitants of Claveria are the indigenous Higaonons, most of its inhabitants are descendants of Visayans mainly from Cebu and Bohol who migrated long before the Spaniards arrived. Other residents of the municipality include Bicolanos, Ilocanos, Ivatans, Kapampangans, Pangasinans and Tagalogs from Luzon and Hiligaynons and Warays from Visayas, including their descendants.

Although Cebuano or Binisaya/Bisaya is widely spoken in Claveria, majority of the population can speak Filipino the national language and as well as English which is commonly use in schools and government offices. There is a native tribe in the municipality that has their own dialect, the Higaonons which also speaks their "Binukid" tongue or Higaonon language. Binisaya/Bisaya is the conversational language spoken by Claverians at home. Other languages spoken are Ilocano, Ivatan, Kapampangan and Hiligaynon, to varying degrees by their respective communities within the municipality.

=== Religion ===
Approximately over 85% of the populace are Roman Catholics and the rest comprises the Protestants and others. Every barangay has their own Catholic parish churches with one in Poblacion serves as the mother parish for the entire town. The Our Lady of Lourdes Parish church is the center of Catholic faith within the municipality. There is also a notable group situated in Barangay Aposkahoy known as Doalnara which is a community of people who has their own belief making the talk abouts among the locals. It has been controversial in the past years due to its peculiar way of living among its followers. Although the town's community has various religious beliefs, people all live peacefully and harmoniously altogether.

== Economy ==
Poverty incidence of Claveria (%)

Source: Philippine Statistics Authority

The local economy is mainly an agricultural area. Its income basically comes from crop production, freshwater products, and livestock or poultry output. Crop production includes vegetables, corn, root crops, coffee, and rice. The plantation of tomato and bell pepper is a common site in the vicinity. The most recent there has been a major plantation of pineapples by the Del Monte Philippines, Inc. The freshwater products include anga, pigok, haloan (snakehead murrel), bunak, damagan, subok, dalapakan, and kasili (eels). Livestock comprises swine, cattle, and poultry products. The Mindanao Silk Mulberry Farm which produces silk is also situated in the municipality. It is run by the Philippine Textile Research Institute - (PTRI) Mindanao office.

== Government ==
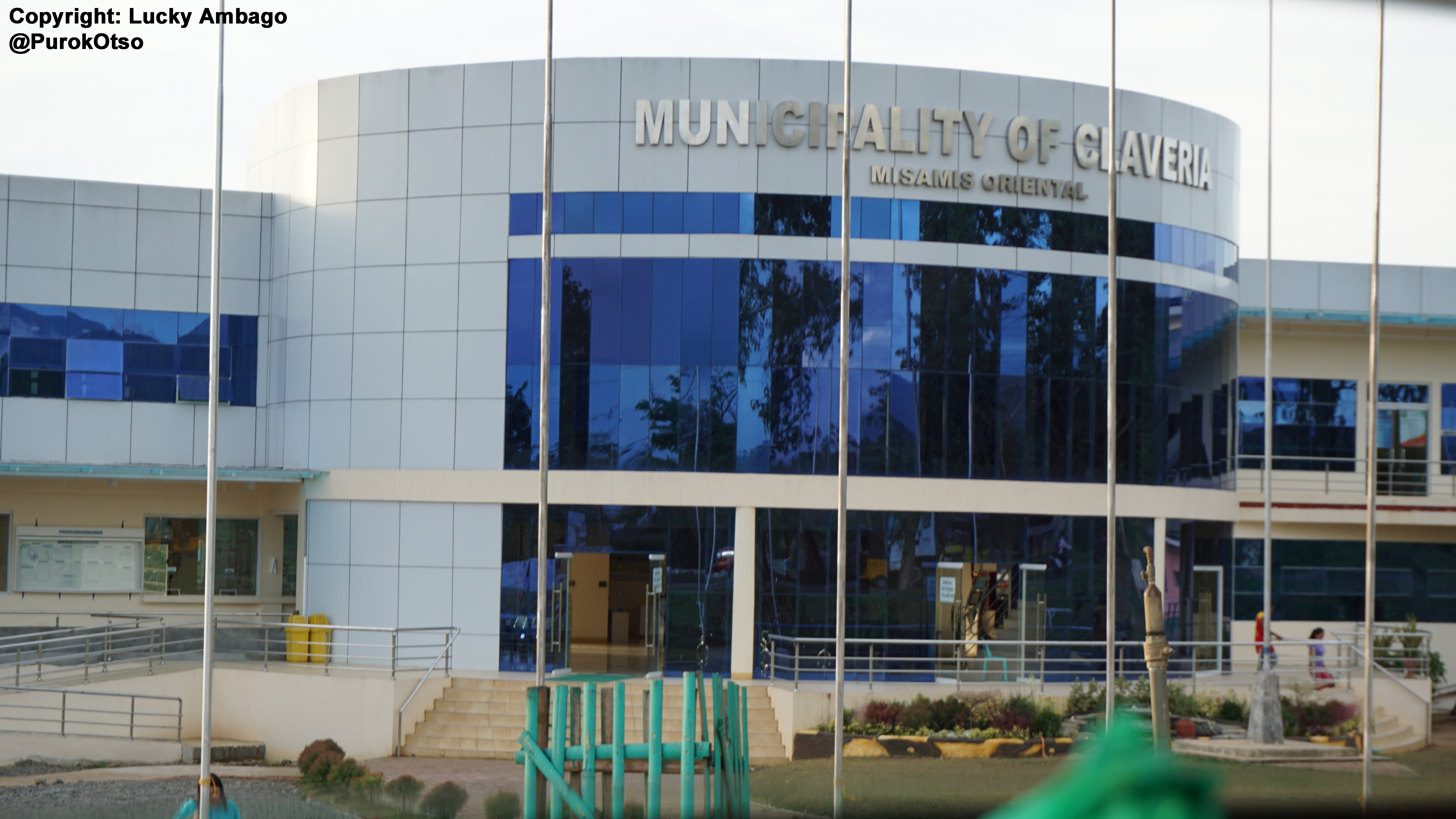
Municipal Hall Facade

The municipality of Claveria is governed by a town Mayor and a Vice Mayor which takes office in absence of the former. The municipal council is compose of 8 coming from the town, 1 from the president of the Barangay Captain's League and 1 from the president of Sangguniang Kabataan (Youth Council) Chairman's League of Claveria totalling a number of 10 councilors (kagawad).

== Education ==
The town is the seat of the premier agriculture school of the entire province, the University of Science and Technology of Southern Philippines – Claveria Campus (formerly MOSCAT). Claveria has a total of 7 National High Schools and 2 Central Schools. All 24 barangays has its own Elementary School. There are also privately run pre-schools, grade schools, and secondary school operating in the municipality.

=== Private Schools ===
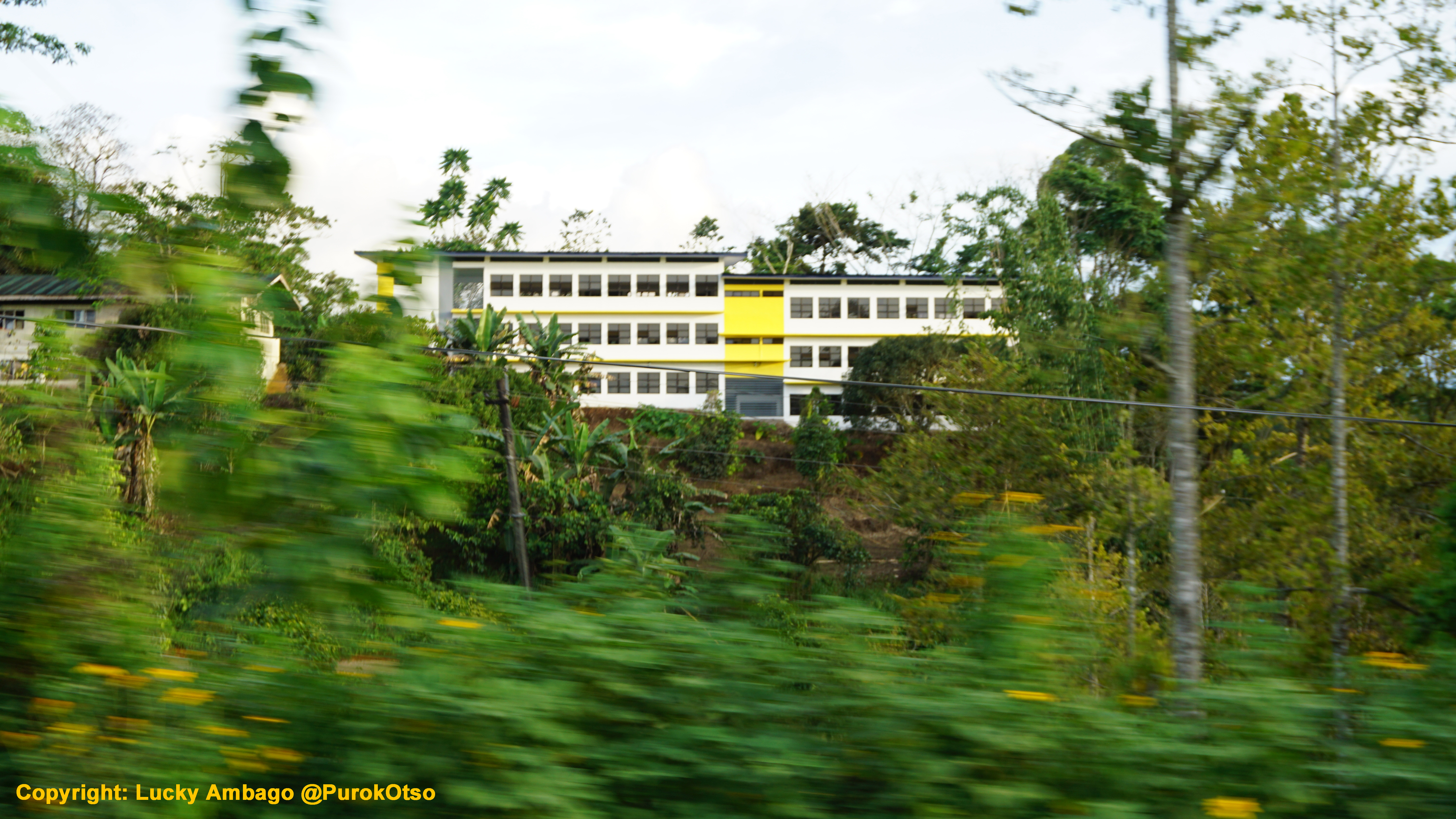
University of Science and Technology of Southern Philippines - Claveria Campus

- Our Lady of Lourdes Academy of Claveria
- Cherubims Learning Center Inc.
- Doalnara Agricultural Academy

=== Central Schools ===
- Claveria Central School
- Mat-i Central School

=== Public Secondary Schools ===
- Mat-i National High School
- Aposkahoy National High School
- Rizal National High School
- Hinaplanan National High School
- Malagana National High School
- Patrocinio National High School
- Dr. Gerardo Sabal Memorial National High School

=== Tertiary ===
- University of Science and Technology of Southern Philippines (USTsP) - Claveria Campus

== Notable personalities ==
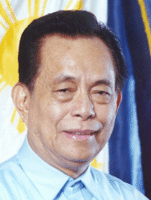
Aquilino Pimentel Jr.

- Aquilino Pimentel Jr. - commonly known as Nene Pimentel, is a Filipino politician who served as the President of the Senate of the Philippines from 2000 to 2001. He is the father of former Senate President Aquilino Pimentel III.
