= Cebu Pacific Flight 387 =

1998 aviation accident in the Philippines

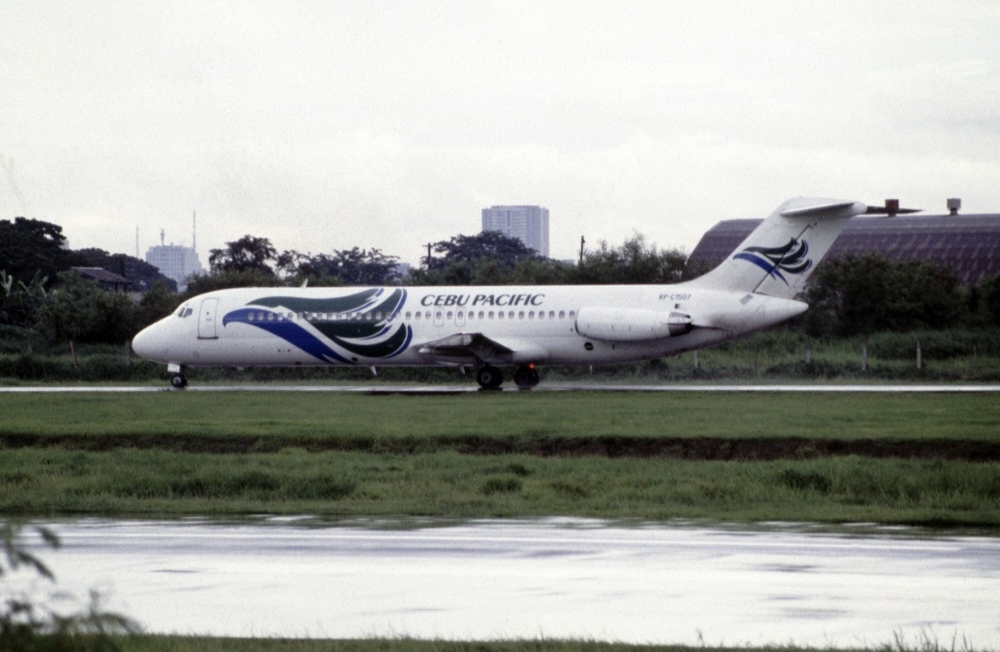
- RP-C1507, the aircraft involved in the accident, seen in 1997

Accident
- Date: February 2, 1998
- Summary: Controlled flight into terrain
- Site: Mount Sumagaya, Claveria, Misamis Oriental, Philippines; 08°38′56.20″N 125°01′59.60″E

Aircraft
- Aircraft type: McDonnell Douglas DC-9-32
- Operator: Cebu Pacific
- IATA flight No.: 5J387
- ICAO flight No.: CEB387
- Call sign: CEBU 387
- Registration: RP-C1507
- Flight origin: Ninoy Aquino International Airport, Metro Manila, Philippines
- Stopover: Daniel Z. Romualdez Airport, Tacloban, Philippines
- Destination: Lumbia Airfield (formerly Lumbia Airport), Cagayan de Oro, Philippines
- Occupants: 104
- Passengers: 99
- Crew: 5
- Fatalities: 104
- Survivors: 0

Cebu Pacific Flight 387 was a domestic flight from Ninoy Aquino International Airport in Metro Manila to Lumbia Airfield (formerly Lumbia Airport) in Cagayan de Oro. On February 2, 1998, the 30-year-old McDonnell Douglas DC-9-32 crashed on the slopes of Mount Sumagaya in Claveria. All 104 people on board died in the crash. It is the second deadliest air disaster in the Philippines after Air Philippines Flight 541, which occurred two years later.

The crash site is now a memorial, inaugurated on February 2, 2021, for the victims of the flight. The memorial is now part of a tourism complex in Misamis Oriental. The structure is 20 metres (66 ft) tall.

== Background ==
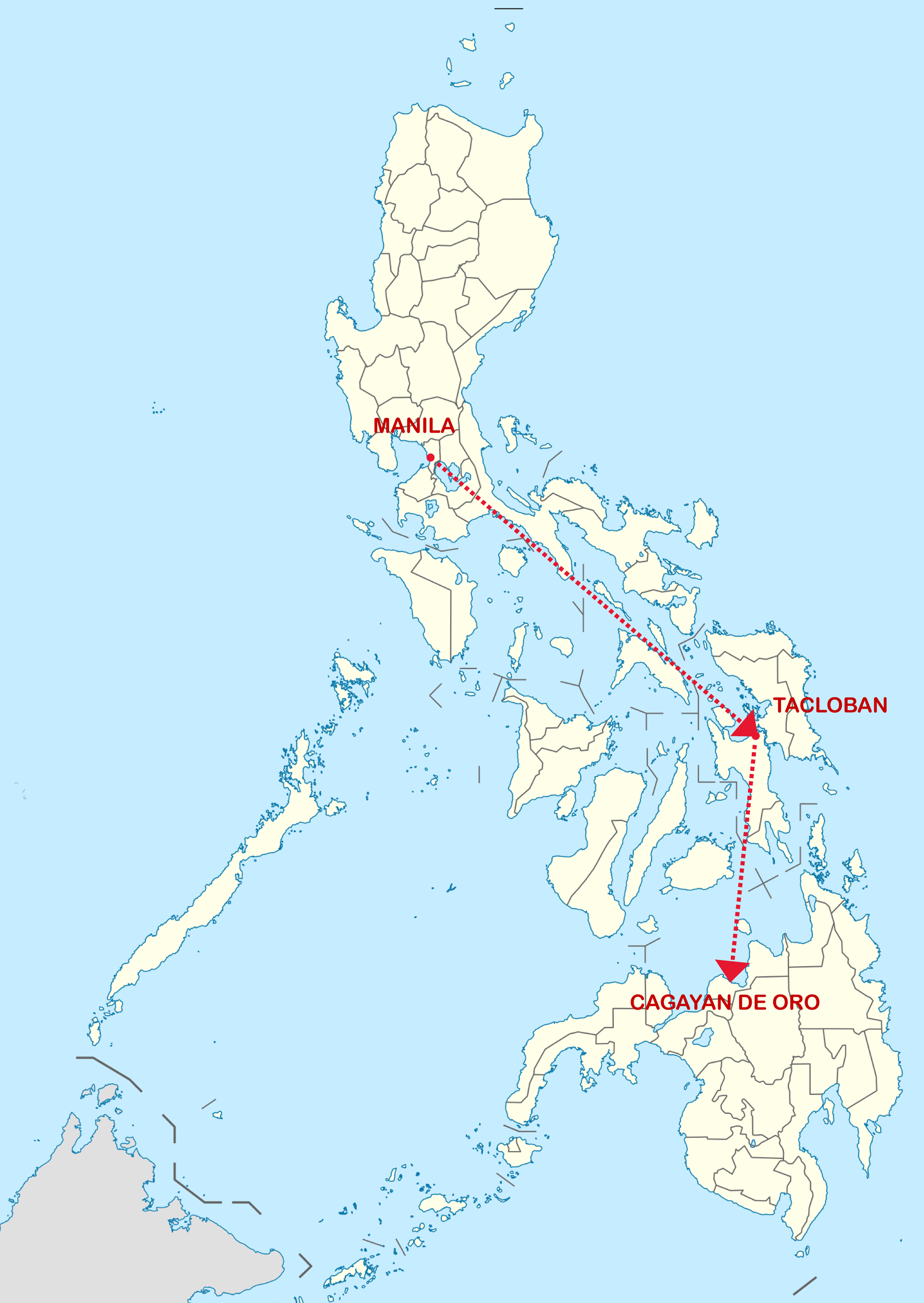
Route of the flight

=== Aircraft ===
The aircraft involved in the accident was a McDonnell Douglas DC-9 (registration number RP-C1507). It was first delivered to Air Canada in September 1967 as C-FTLQ, before its acquisition by Cebu Pacific in March 1997.

=== Passengers and crew ===
In command of the flight was Captain Paulo Justo. His co-pilot was First Officer Erwin Golla. There were five crew members and 94 Filipino passengers, including five children. One passenger each came from Australia, Austria, Canada, Japan, Switzerland, and the United States, totaling 104 passengers.

== Accident ==
The plane left Manila at 01:00 GMT and was scheduled to arrive at 03:03 GMT in Cagayan de Oro. The plane made a stopover at Tacloban at 02:20 GMT, though sources differ about whether it was a scheduled or unscheduled stop. According to one source, the flight made an unscheduled stop at Tacloban to deliver a needed airplane tire for another Cebu Pacific aircraft in Tacloban. The last contact was 15 minutes before the plane was due to land, with the airport's ATC. In that transmission, the pilot said he was 68 kilometers (42 mi; 37 nmi) from the airport and was starting to descend. There was no indication that the plane was in trouble. The plane crashed 45 kilometers (28 mi; 24 nmi) away from the airport.

== Cause ==
The cause of the crash is still a source of controversy in the Philippines. Colonel Jacinto Ligot – who would later be involved in an unrelated corruption scandal more than a decade after the accident – was the chief of the Philippine Air Force rescue team, which faced difficulties due to the deep ravines and dense vegetation on the slopes of the mountain. The pilots were flying visually, not instrumentally, when the plane vanished from radar. While the skies were clear at the airport, the mountains may have been covered by fog. Chief of Staff General Clemente Mariano speculated that the plane "almost cleared the top of the mountain, but it may have suffered a down-draft, causing it to hit the mountain." Jesus Dureza, the crisis manager during the rescue and retrieval operations, said he found out the Air Transportation Office maps used by the pilots listed the elevation of Mt. Sumagaya at 5,000 feet (1,500 m) above sea level, while the mountain is actually over 7,300 feet (2,200 m) above sea level. This error might have misled the pilots to believe that they were clear of terrain, while in fact they were flying dangerously low. The ATO, on the other hand, pointed out in its official report deficiencies in the training of the pilots.
