= Laguindingan Airport =

Airport in Misamis Oriental, Philippines

Laguindingan Airport Tugpahanan sa Laguindingan Paliparan ng Laguindingan Landing a Laguindingan
- Façade in December 2023
- IATA: CGY; ICAO: RPMY; WMO: 98748

Summary
- Airport type: Public
- Owner: Civil Aviation Authority of the Philippines
- Operator: Aboitiz InfraCapital, Inc.
- Serves: Northern Mindanao (except Misamis Occidental)
- Location: Barangay Moog, Laguindingan, Misamis Oriental, Philippines
- Opened: June 15, 2013; 13 years ago
- Elevation AMSL: 58 m (190 ft)
- Coordinates: 08°36′45″N 124°27′26″E

Map
- Location within Mindanao mainland Location within Philippines

Runways
Direction	Length		Surface
Direction	m	ft	Surface
09/27	2,100	6,890	Concrete

Statistics (2024)
- Passengers: 2,265,767 ▲12.50%
- Aircraft movements: 16,042 ▲8.66%
- Cargo (in kg): 21,198,779 ▲18.44%
- Source: National Economic and Development Authority Region 10

Laguindingan Airport (IATA: CGY, ICAO: RPMY), also referred to as Laguindingan International Airport, is an international airport in Northern Mindanao that serves the cities of Cagayan de Oro, Iligan and Marawi, as well as the provinces of Misamis Oriental, Lanao del Norte and Bukidnon in the Philippines. The airport is Mindanao's second-busiest airport after Francisco Bangoy International Airport in Davao City.

While the airport is billed as an international airport, Laguindigan Airport is classified as a Class 1 principal (major domestic) airport by the Civil Aviation Authority of the Philippines (CAAP), a body of the Department of Transportation (DOTr) responsible for implementing policies on civil aviation to assure safe, economic and efficient air travel, and the handling of operations at airports (except major international ones).

The airport sits on a 4.17-square-kilometer (1.61 sq mi) site in Barangay Moog, Laguindingan, and is 46 kilometers (29 mi) from Cagayan de Oro and 57 kilometers (35 mi) from Iligan. It opened on June 15, 2013, and replaced both Lumbia Airport (now Lumbia Airfield) in Lumbia, Cagayan de Oro and Maria Cristina Airport in Maria Cristina, Iligan. Lumbia Airport now serves as a military air base for the Philippine Air Force, while Maria Cristina Airport in Iligan serves general aviation.

== History ==
=== Funding and implementation ===
Sources of funds for the Laguindingan Airport Development Project
- Source of funds: Funds (in millions of US$)
- from the South Korea's Economic Development and Cooperation Fund: 30.60 million
- from the Export Credit Loan facility of the KEXIM: 62.75 million
- from the Philippine Government: 60.36 million
- for the Air Navigation and Support facilities from KEXIM: 13.38 million

The airport project was implemented by the Philippine Government through the Department of Transportation and Communications. After the completion of the project, the airport was turned over to the Civil Aviation Authority of the Philippines. The airport project envisages the development of new major trunkline airports compliant to international standards of safety and operations to meet the air transportation demand of the region. The airport project also aims to boost economic activities, specifically of the Cagayan-Iligan Corridor, and expects to serve as the gateway to Northern Mindanao.

The approved cost of the airport project is US$167.09 million or ₱7.853 billion. The cost was duly approved by the National Economic and Development Authority Board on August 30, 2007. Plans for the upgrade have existed since 1991 but have been stymied by land acquisition and financing problems. Although the Philippine Government has signed a US$25 million soft loan agreement with the South Korean government through its Economic Development Cooperation Fund, there has been difficulty in raising counterpart funding for acquisition of the estimated 300 hectares of land eventually required by the airport complex.

The Laguindingan Airport Development Project was inaugurated on January 10, 2006, with groundbreaking ceremonies presided by former President Gloria Macapagal Arroyo, who advocated the idea of an international airport along the Cagayan de Oro-Iligan Corridor.

=== Construction and opening ===
By July 2007, the construction of the 4.4-kilometer (2.7 mi) four-lane access road had started to connect the new airport to the national road.

In early 2008, grading of the airport site area started. It was headed by the Department of Transportation and Communications and its foreign and local consultants, South Korea-based Yooshin Engineering Corporation and Ortigas Center, Pasig-based SCHEMA Konsult, Inc. respectively, and Hanjin Heavy Industries and Construction Company as the general contractor for the project.

Former President Benigno Aquino III expected that the opening of the airport would happen in April 2013. However, on April 18, 2013, the DOTC announced that the opening would be pushed back to June 15, 2013 because CAAP had received requests from airlines to postpone the transfer until after the summer peak season, as an April 30 opening would require the cancellation of several daily trips. It was inaugurated by President Aquino on June 13, 2013, two days before its opening.

=== Contemporary history ===
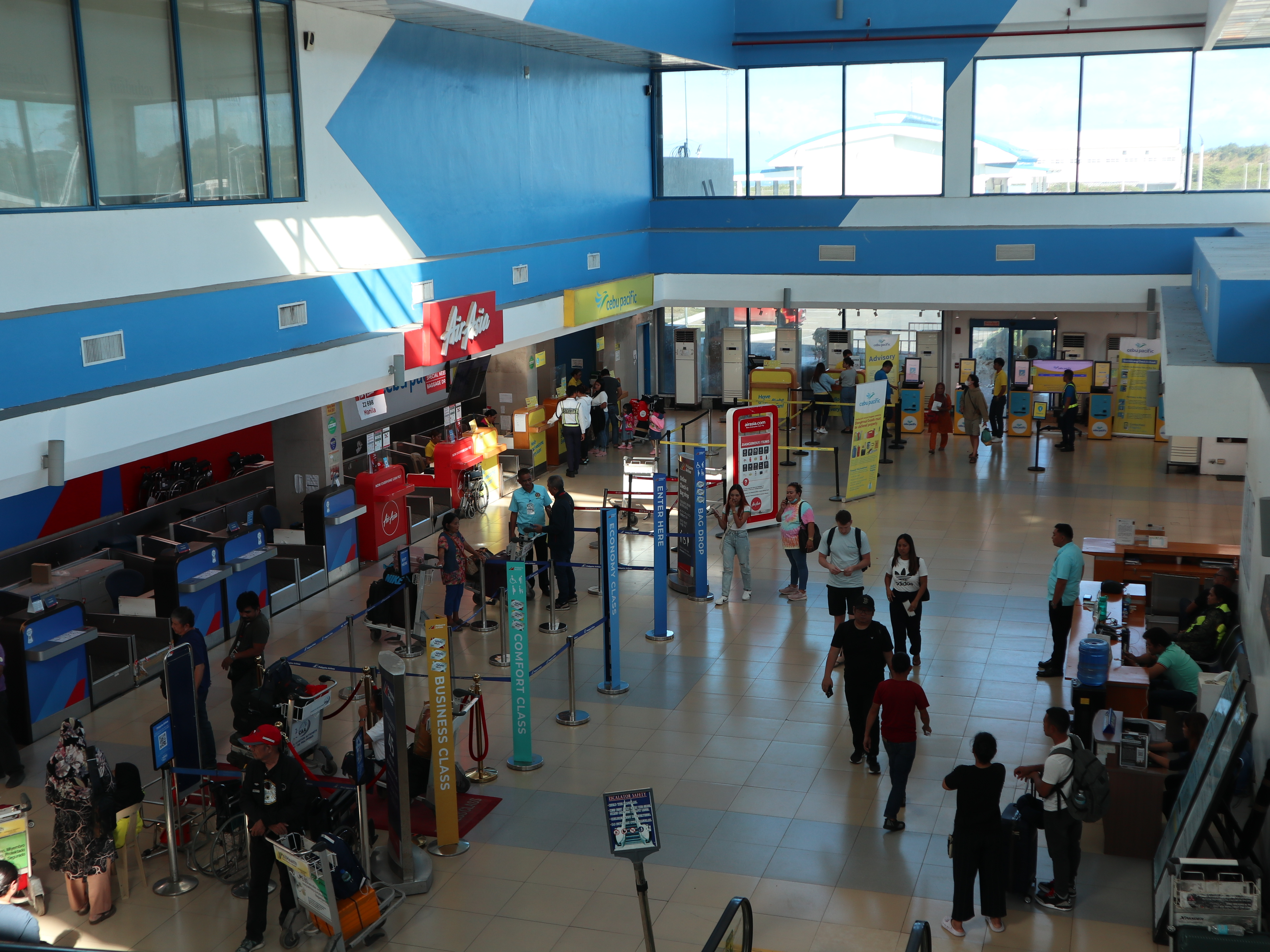
Airport interior in 2023

Laguindingan Airport was expected to facilitate night landings by December 2014, upon the completion of the installation of various navigational systems. However, it was only on March 12, 2015, that the airport began to accommodate night flights. With this recent development, operating hours were increased to 5:00 am to 9:00 pm PHT from the previous 6:00 am to 6:00 pm PHT (sunrise-sunset) daily schedule.

On October 20, 2017, Cebu Pacific launched the airport as its seventh hub, with its regional subsidiary Cebgo adding flights to Caticlan and Dumaguete from the airport.

Philippine Airlines opened the Mabuhay Lounge at the airport in January 2018, but it has been closed since March 2020 due to the COVID-19 pandemic until its reopening in August 2024.

== Future development ==
=== Upgrading and expansion ===
In August 2013, the Project Development and Monitoring Facility Board approved the revision of the operations and maintenance of the airport. The operations and maintenance were already approved for funding, but were revised to include the construction of a new terminal to the winning PPP bidder. The Department of Transportation and Communications was tasked to construct the terminal along with other airside civil works, air navigational facilities, landside building works, and other facilities. The revision is part of maintaining the airport on par with ICAO standards.

According to the Civil Aviation Authority of the Philippines and airport manager Jose Bodiongan, the airport would become the “busiest regional transportation hub” with the installation of the runway lights, navigation equipment (required for nighttime flights) and the purchase of two new fire trucks.

An expansion of the passenger and cargo terminals and parking lot are being planned. With the large South Korean presence in Cagayan de Oro, the regional Department of Tourism is eyeing flights from Busan to Cagayan de Oro via Singapore or a direct route from Busan to Cagayan de Oro to further bolster the tourism industry in the region. The CAAP was set to initially approve Busan-Cagayan de Oro and Seoul-Cagayan de Oro flights by the fourth quarter of 2015, but these did not come to fruition.

On February 26, 2019, Aboitiz InfraCapital Inc. was granted by CAAP an Original Proponent Status (OPS) for its unsolicited proposal for the airport's upgrade, expansion, operations, and maintenance. After undergoing an unsuccessful Swiss challenge, on September 30, 2024, the Philippine government awarded Aboitiz InfraCapital with a ₱12.75-billion contract to develop and maintain the airport beginning in April 2025. On October 28, 2024, the concession agreement was signed.

=== Region development ===
Ayala Land, who owned 183 of the 417 hectares of land acquired by the government to develop the airport complex, was evaluating the aerotropolis concept in 2011 for the region around the airport. This is part of the pre-conditions granted by Civil Aviation Authority of the Philippines for expropriating the lands the government bought from the corporation. Ayala Corporation, the parent company of Ayala Land, is one of the bidders in privatizing, through the public-private partnership scheme, the operations and maintenance of the airport.

In September 2017, Ayala Land was planning to build its first industrial estate outside Luzon within the region.

== Structure ==
=== Passenger terminal ===
The airport has a 7,184-square-meter (77,330 sq ft) passenger terminal building that can accommodate 1.6 million passengers a year. The airport can accommodate 2,000 passengers a day.

=== Building terminal ===
==== Departures ====
The airport has security screening machines in the main entrance and all entrances to boarding gates, check-in counters and drop-off counters by various airlines. There is a second floor for gates 1-3 while 4 is for arrivals only and bypass gate. All of the second-floor gates have jetways. With the new extension, new gates 5 and 6 are now open, but located at the ground level, and aircraft can be accessed or boarded by aircraft stairs. There are a few amenities such as restrooms, elevators, small playrooms, lounges and food stores. Gate 4 is used when there is no parking space for aircraft in the three major boarding gates and the landing time has been altered or the aircraft is in a holding pattern before landing.

==== Arrivals ====
The only arrival gate by building was the gate 4 and the aircraft can exit by the gate's jetway. After the gate, there are an elevator and stairs to the arrivals section of the building. In the arrival section are a baggage claim and vacant seats for waiting passengers. There is also a main exit at the baggage claim section. After the main exit is the Arrival Hall, with a few restaurants, food stores, souvenir shops and an exit to the arrival bays and parking lot. Also, there are people (served as taxi/shuttle drivers in various taxi/transport cooperatives) standing by at near the main exit of baggage claim area, waiting for their transport or going to their home location to any point such as Cagayan de Oro and Malaybalay, Bukidnon (Misamis Oriental), Iligan and Marawi (Lanao del Norte) and other parts of Misamis Occidental or Misamis Oriental.

=== Runway ===
The airport has a single 2,100-by-45-meter (6,890 by 148 ft) concrete runway which can accommodate four takeoffs and landings an hour. The runway consists of over 500 blocks that are grouted by asphalt.

The runway is equipped with an instrument landing system (ILS) and runway lightning, making it capable of night landings. The only access to runway is the taxiway A and backtracking in every taxi roll for landing and takeoff.

=== Air traffic control tower ===
The Air Traffic Control (ATC) is managed by Civil Aviation Authority of the Philippines (CAAP) and designed to run 24 hours a day. They are tasked for aircraft guiding such as approach, ILS, takeoff and cruising. This tower was used to oversee the airplanes and it is standard for CAAP-owned airports and privately owned airports.

==== Tower ====
The tower for the ATC at Laguindingan International Airport was built by concrete and steel rebars. The tower has an elevator, stairs or emergency stairs. The platform and the covered section was built by cement and concrete, steel rebars, glass, steel roofing and steel C-shaped beams for roof support. The tower has air-conditioning. The ATC building has a height of 36.7 meters tall with the controller's eye at 33.5 meters. The area for the ATC building is 1,139 m^{3} (sqm).

== Airlines and destinations ==
=== Passenger ===
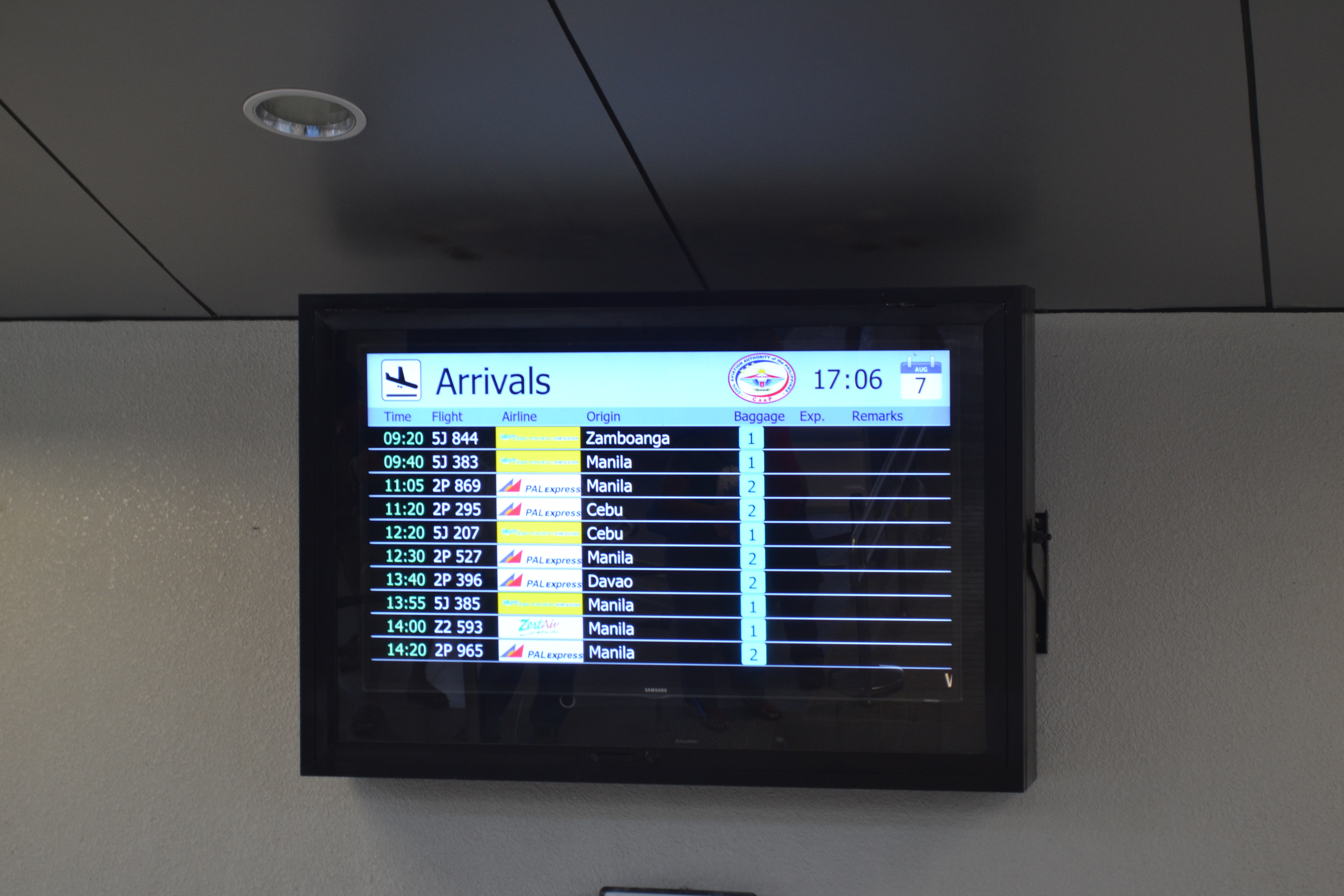
A flight information display system seen at the arrival area

Airlines	Destinations
Cebgo	Davao, Iloilo
Cebu Pacific	Cebu, Manila
PAL Express	Cebu, Manila
Philippine Airlines	Cebu, Manila
Philippines AirAsia	Manila

=== Cargo ===
Airlines	Destinations
Skyway Airlines	Clark

== Statistics ==
Data from Civil Aviation Authority of the Philippines (CAAP).

Year	Passenger movements	% change	Aircraft movements	% change	Cargo movements (in kg)	% change
2013 (Note: Data from June to December 2013.)	1,016,463	Steady	4,654	Steady	12,117,303	Steady
2014	1,553,346	▲52.82	11,638	▲150.06	21,803,029	▲79.93
2015	1,756,445	▲13.07	13,702	▲17.74	25,983,455	▲19.17
2016	1,776,353	▲1.13	14,056	▲2.58	20,482,959	▼21.17
2017	1,814,644	▲2.16	15,802	▲12.42	17,604,861	▼14.05
2018	2,079,684	▲14.61	17,478	▲10.61	25,366,119	▲44.09
2019	2,310,473	▲11.10	18,202	▲4.14	26,767,261	▲5.52
2020	581,136	▼74.85	6,950	▼61.82	16,348,443	▼38.92
2021	611,469	▲5.22	7,080	▲1.87	13,984,133	▼14.46
2022	1,664,643	▲172.24	13,344	▲88.47	12,635,611	▼9.64
2024	2,265,767	▲12.50	16,042	▲8.66	21,198,779	▲18.44

== See also ==
- List of airports in the Philippines
- Lumbia Airport (former airport)
- Northern Mindanao
