= Doalnara =

South Korean new religious movement that focuses on farms

The Doalnara Restoration Society is a global restoration movement with the aim of restoring the health of physical land, the physical body, and the mental health of fellow man. Established in South Korea in 1980 in accordance to the teachings of Teacher Suk Sun, Doalnara means 'Stone Country' referring to a society of people who follow Heaven’s Providence with unchanging heart and character as firm as stone.

There are 10 organic farms in Korea; and there are also Doalnara branches outside of Korea, in the United States, Japan, the Philippines, Kenya, Brazil, and more.

== Beliefs and practices ==
Doalnara's principles are based on lessons by Teacher Suk Sun, whose teachings include:

- First: When you trace back to the origins and root of humanity, we all came from the same parents and are one family. This is not just a sentiment or theory.
- Second: All of humanity's countless troubles and problems originate from our hearts. Eliminating selfishness in the heart changes the earth into a world that can truly prosper.
- Third: The true happiness humanity seeks is fulfilled when our household becomes a “mini-heaven”. Not when we "go to" heaven.

Instead of using titles such as president, chairman, bishop, or any traditional titles, family titles are used such as brother, sister, mother, father, aunt, and uncle. When a title is necessary in taking responsibilities for specific activities, along with an accepted title, the person would be addressed as the family member who is in the position to humbly serve others with brotherly love.

Doalnara communities do not have or support the use of alcohol, tobacco, violence, verbal and physical abuse, agricultural chemicals, chemical additives, and the like. Doalnara members observe the Sabbath, from Friday evening to Saturday evening in accordance to the Ten Commandments which says to "Remember the Sabbath Day, to keep it holy."

=== Farm operations ===
All Doalnara locations throughout the world adhere to agricultural practices that value the soil and seek to understand nature instead of using conventional agricultural practices. Instead of using chemical fertilizers, pesticides, and/or herbicides, Doalnara only uses organic farming methods with environmental restoration as its highest priority. As a result, all products grown by Doalnara are free from toxic agricultural chemicals.

Doalnara members eat foods grown from unharmed and unsprayed soil. Besides sharing and consuming fresh foods, by research and development, Doalnara also uses its produce to make various health food products.

== Doalnara organizations ==
- Doalnara Hannong Educational Center is a place to learn Doalnara lessons, sustainable farming practices, natural diet, and restorative medicine and treatments.
- Doalnara Trade and GB Root is responsible for “Project Guarding Korea” and other overseas agricultural projects.
- Doalnara Certified Organic Korea certifies farms and facilities according to national and international standards as South Korea's second accredited certification body (CB).
- Doalnara Hannong School of the Arts develops future minds and talent in the areas of music, dance, and visual arts.
- Doalnara Hannong Foods makes products from foods grown organically on Doalnara farmlands.
- Hannong Pharmaceutical researches and develops health and treatment products, including Korea's only registered activated-carbon antidote.
- Hannong Steel manufactures materials and products to build better rural residences.
- “Honoring Your Parents Movement” and “Aid the Koreis Movement” are campaigns in operation to raise awareness to create a more respectful and compassionate world.
- Doalnara Arts Group holds modern and traditional music performances.

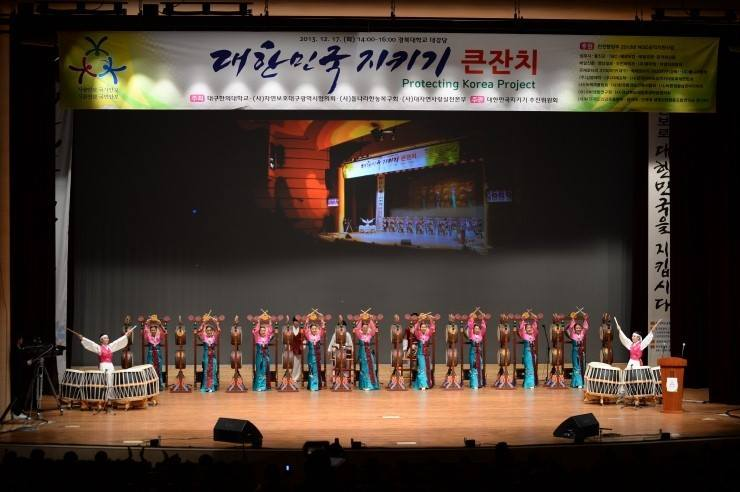
Doalnara Arts Group performing at Daegu, South Korea during Korea Daegu Festival on December 18, 2013.
