= Mount Sumagaya =

Mountain in Mindanao, Philippines

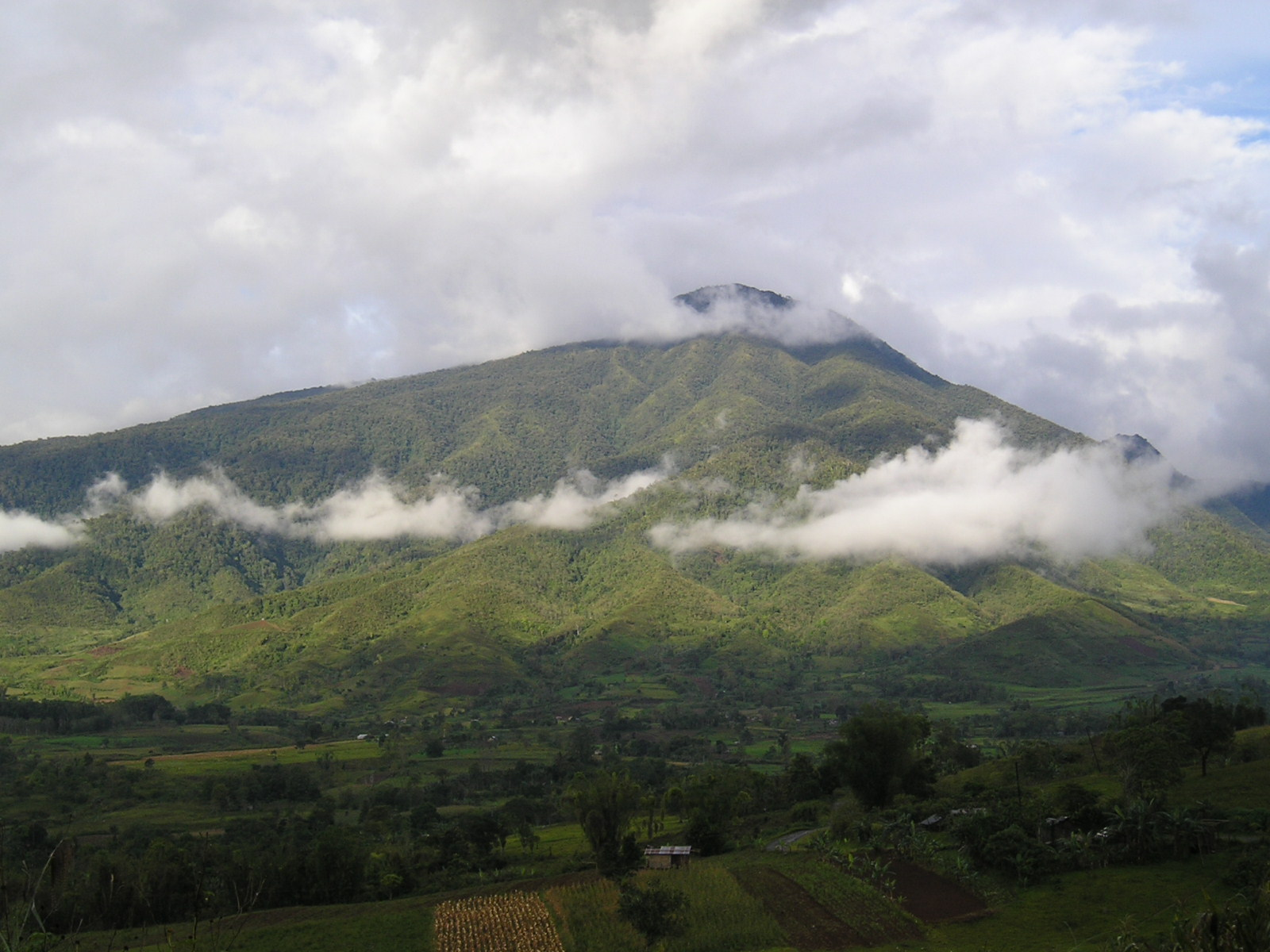
- Mount Sumagaya, taken in Lanise, Claveria

Highest point
- Elevation: 2,248 m (7,375 ft)
- Coordinates: 8°39′00″N 125°02′00″E

Geography
- Location within Mindanao mainland Location within Philippines
- Location: Mindanao
- Country: Philippines
- Region: Northern Mindanao
- Province: Misamis Oriental
- Municipality: Claveria
- Parent range: Central Mindanao Cordillera

Geology
- Rock age: unknown

Climbing
- Easiest route: Mat-i Trail

Mount Sumagaya is a mountain on the northern section of Mindanao in the Philippines. It is under the territorial jurisdiction of the municipality of Claveria, Misamis Oriental. It stands at a height of about 2,248 metres (7,375 ft).

It is part of the Central Mindanao Cordillera that stretches from Camiguin in the north to Sarangani in the south. The mountain rose to prominence after the crash of Cebu Pacific Flight 387 on its slopes in 1998, one of the deadliest aviation incidents in the Philippines.

== See also ==
- List of active volcanoes in the Philippines
- List of potentially active volcanoes in the Philippines
