= Francisco Bangoy International Airport =

Airport serving Davao, Philippines

Francisco Bangoy International Airport Tugpahanang Pangkalibutanon sa Francisco Bangoy Paliparang Pandaigdig ng Francisco Bangoy
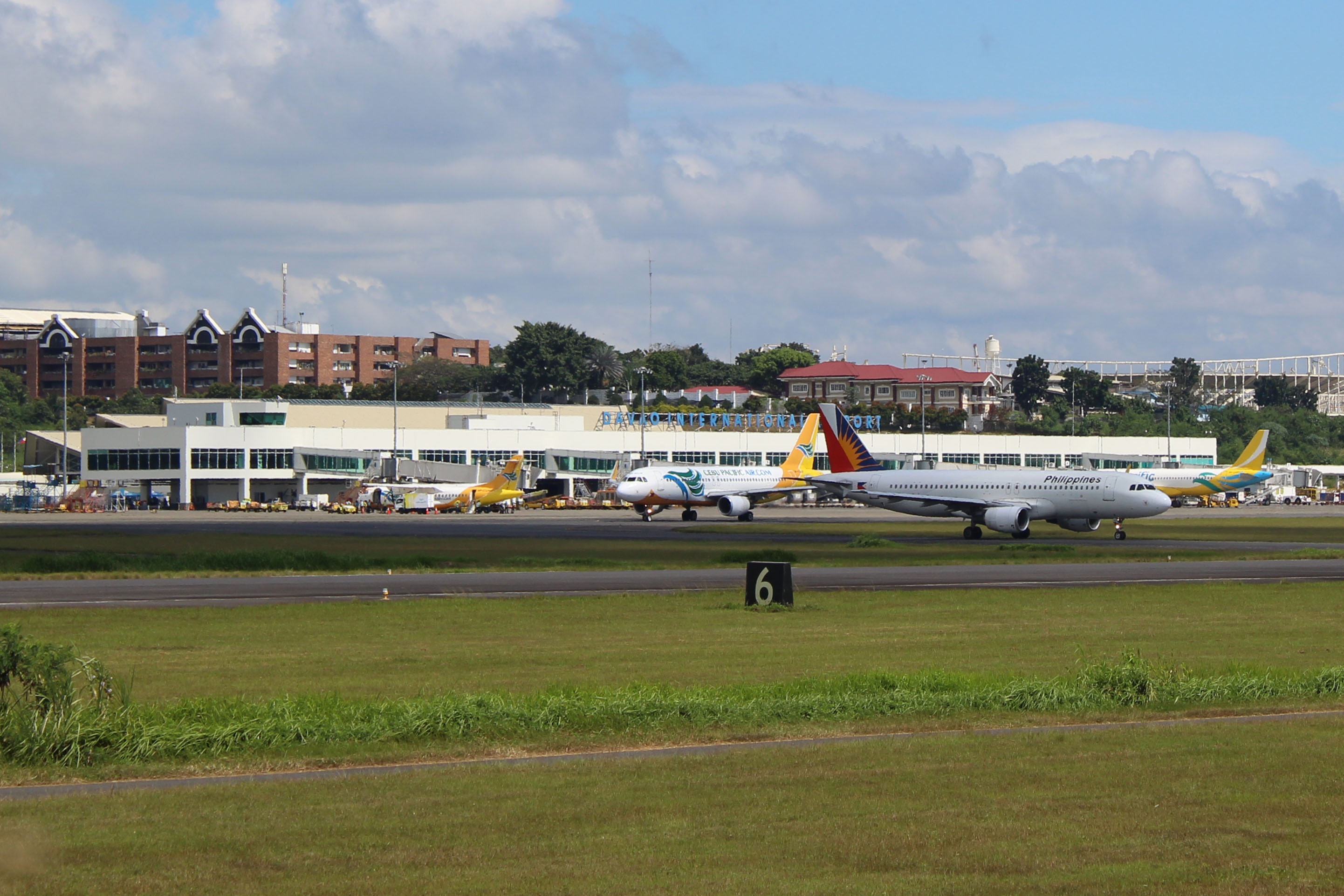
- The airport in January 2018 as viewed from across the runway
- IATA: DVO; ICAO: RPMD; WMO: 98753

Summary
- Airport type: Public
- Owner/Operator: Davao International Airport Authority
- Serves: Metro Davao
- Location: Barangay Sasa, Buhangin, Davao City, Philippines
- Opened: August 25, 1958; 68 years ago
- Hub for: PAL Express
- Operating base for: Cebu Pacific
- Time zone: PHT (UTC+08:00)
- Elevation AMSL: 29 m (95 ft)
- Coordinates: 07°07′31″N 125°38′45″E

Maps
- Location within Mindanao mainland Location within Philippines

Runways
Direction	Length		Surface
Direction	m	ft	Surface
05/23	3,000	9,843	Asphalt concrete

Statistics (2025)
- Passengers: 4,390,098 ▲1.18%
- Aircraft movements: 28,564 ▼1.78%
- Cargo (in kg): 49,754,948 ▼2.82%
- Source: CAAP

Francisco Bangoy International Airport (IATA: DVO, ICAO: RPMD), also known as Davao International Airport, is the main airport serving Davao City and Davao Region in the Philippines. Serving as the main gateway to Mindanao, it is the busiest airport on the island and the third busiest in the Philippines in 2022.

== History ==
=== Early history ===
The site of the airport began operations in the 1940s as Sasa Landing Field with a donation of land in barangay Sasa, located in Buhangin district of Davao City, by Don Francisco Bangoy, the then-current patriarch of an influential family that founded and settled in Davao alongside Don Jose Uyanguren. At the time it began operation, the airport merely consisted of a 1,200-meter (3,900 ft) unpaved grass runway and quonset huts serving as terminal buildings. At the time, and throughout much of the 1940s and the early 1950s, both Philippine Air Lines and the Philippine Air Force provided air service to the city.

=== As a civil aviation airport ===
Old airport terminal

The Davao (Sasa) Airport was opened for civil aviation on August 25, 1958. It initially consisted of a new 1,500-meter (4,900 ft) long by 30-meter (98 ft) wide concrete runway and a 200-meter (660 ft) long by 60-meter (200 ft) wide apron. The grass airstrip was later converted as a taxiway for general aviation.

By 1959, the complex consisted of a small control tower and several low-rise buildings. On June 19, 1960, Republic Act No. 2762 was enacted which renamed the airport to Francisco Bangoy Airport in honor of the late Don Francisco Bangoy. Right of way and access to the terminal buildings and the airport were improved through further donation of land by Paciano Bangoy, Francisco's son, during the latter stages of Paciano's gubernatorial term. In 1970, the runway was extended and widened to 2,000 meters (6,600 ft) and 36 meters (118 ft), respectively, while the apron was widened to 100 meters (330 ft). Five years later, the runway was further extended and widened to 2,500 meters (8,200 ft) and to the current 45 meters (148 ft), respectively.

Construction for a new terminal designed by Filipino architect Leandro Locsin began in 1976. It was designed to handle a million passengers annually and was completed in 1980. The project, in addition to runway expansions, was funded during the term of then-Congressman Manuel Garcia, whose congressional district covers the airport perimeter. Airbus A300 operations by Philippine Airlines started on September 1, 1989, marking the first widebody service to the city. The first scheduled international passenger service started on April 29, 1992, with the inauguration of Bouraq Airlines flights to Manado, Indonesia. After the launch of scheduled international flights to Davao, regular flights to Kota Kinabalu, Malaysia and Singapore were also commenced by Malaysia Airlines in 1996 and SilkAir in 1997, respectively.

=== Expansion ===
Rapid growth at the airport precipitated the construction of a ₱15 million interim international terminal beside the airport's then-existing terminal, and then eventually a new, larger terminal building that would consolidate the two existing terminals. In planning since 1992, construction began in 2000 and was subsequently inaugurated on December 2, 2003, with a capacity double that of the old airport terminal. The construction of the new ₱2.7 billion building was funded by both the Asian Development Bank (ADB) and the European Investment Bank (EIB). The modernization and upgrading of the airport facilities aim to make Davao as a hub for tourism and foreign investment in the region. Development was funded by a US$40 million loan from the ADB, co-financed by the EIB for twenty-five million ECUs, and through budgetary allocations from the government. The total cost of the project amounted to US$128 million.

As part of the modernization of the airport, the runway was once again extended to the current 3,000 meters (9,800 ft) in 2001 to accommodate future international flights.

=== Contemporary history ===
On November 12, 2007, Cebu Pacific announced the airport as its third hub.

In June 2015, the Mindanao Development Authority announced its plans to turn the 1980–2003 airport terminal into a trade and cultural museum.

Republic Act No. 11457, also known as the Charter of the Davao International Airport Authority, was approved on August 30, 2019, creating and establishing the Davao International Airport Authority, which will manage all airports in the Davao Region, including the Francisco Bangoy International Airport.

== Future developments ==
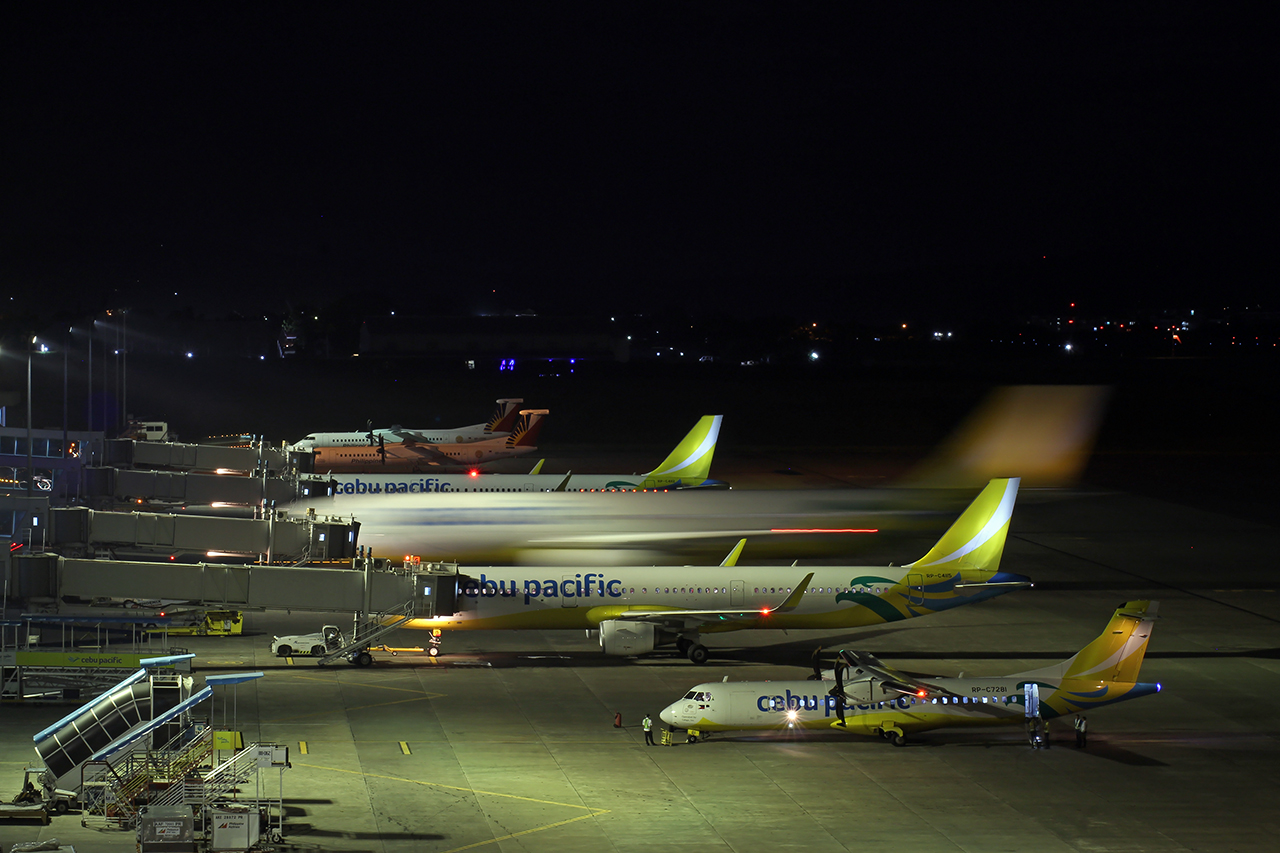
A night shot of the ramp during rush hour

The terminal's exterior, with jet bridge at bay 6 vacant.

The airport was slated for upgrading in 2016, but the project was shelved. In 2017, a subsequent expansion project was announced, leading to an unsolicited proposal by the Udenna Corporation in 2018, which received original proponent status from the Department of Transportation (DOTr) later that year.

Concurrently, a separate, state-funded interim development project was initiated by the DOTr and the Civil Aviation Authority of the Philippines (CAAP) to address immediate terminal constraints. The ₱650 million Passenger Terminal Building (PTB) expansion project is designed to increase the terminal's physical floor area by 48%—expanding the facility from 17,500 to 25,910 square meters—and increase total terminal seating capacity from 1,500 to 2,200 passengers upon its expected completion in December 2026.

For the airport's long-term infrastructure strategy under the national government's Public–Private Partnership (PPP) program, the development structure shifted toward a larger, multi-airport strategy under a Rehabilitate–Operate–Transfer (ROT) model. The project was structured as the Francisco Bangoy International Airport, Southern Luzon International Airport, and Sayak Airport Bundled Project, creating a joint development framework alongside Bicol International Airport and Siargao's Sayak Airport with an estimated total project cost of ₱16.05 billion.

On June 20, 2025, the CAAP issued a letter of acceptance to the Philippine Regional Airports Consortium – composed of Filinvest Infra-Solutions Ventures, Inc., JG Summit Infrastructure Holding Corporation, and Asian Infrastructure and Management Corporation. Following a negotiation extension that concluded in mid-2026, the Implementing Agencies (CAAP and the Davao International Airport Authority) officially issued Original Proponent Status (OPS) to the consortium on June 4, 2026.

The long-term master plan for Davao International Airport under this 30-year concession period is divided into two major development phases:

- Phase 1 (Target 2041): Focuses on initial upgrade works including the expansion and renovation of the existing Passenger Terminal Building (PTB), cargo terminal upgrades, the construction of a new fire station, apron and parking lot expansions, the installation of a parallel taxiway, and the expansion of passenger access roads.
- Phase 2 (Target 2056): Involves further capacity augmentation, including a second expansion and renovation of the PTB, the construction of an entirely new cargo terminal, additional apron and parking lot extensions, and the expansion of ground service equipment (GSE) roads.

The project is currently securing pre-approval requirements before proceeding to the Swiss challenge phase.

== Structure ==
=== Terminal ===
The terminal's interior.

Front side of the terminal building

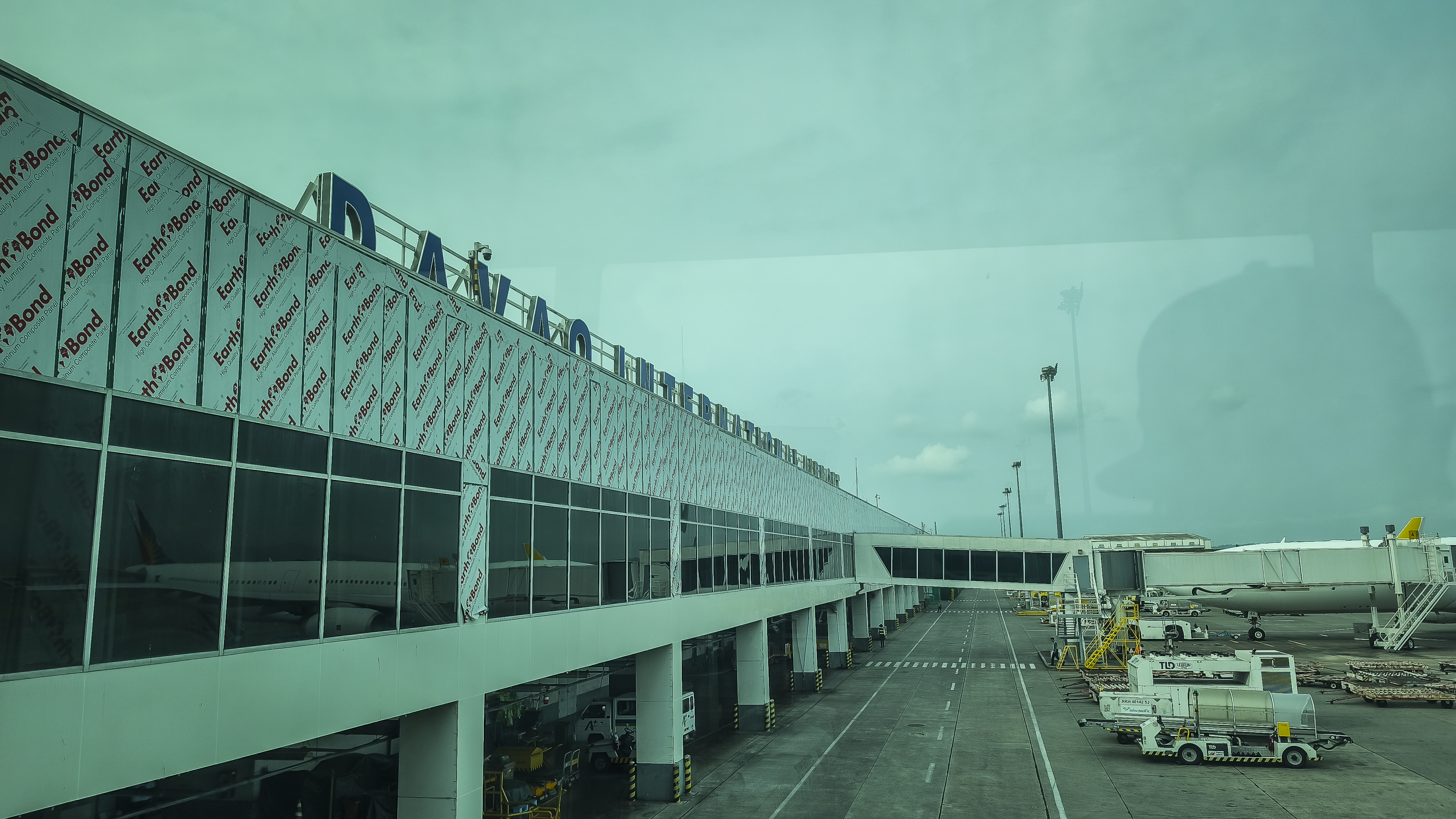
other side of the terminal building

The current passenger terminal is a Malay architecture-inspired building which is four times larger than the old terminal. It is a two-level terminal building with an area of approximately 65,000 square meters (700,000 sq ft). It is fully computerized, more secure and has more commercial spaces for concessionaires at approximately 9,000 square meters (97,000 sq ft) of gross leasable area. It has four (4) jetbridges for passenger boarding. It has a Flight Information Display System and closed-circuit television system complementing the terminal's security system. It is designed to handle approximately 4 million passengers annually. The added capacity is complemented by the latest navigational, security, and baggage handling equipment.

The terminal has 14 domestic and 14 international check-in counters that can handle a steady flow of passenger traffic. The check-in counters are equipped with electronic weighing scales and conveyors and its baggage handling system is also computerized. It has two arrival areas, for domestic and international flights, with two baggage conveyors each. The cargo terminal building covers almost 5,580 square meters (60,100 sq ft) and can handle up to 84,600 tonnes (83,300 long tons; 93,300 short tons) of cargo annually.

=== Runway ===
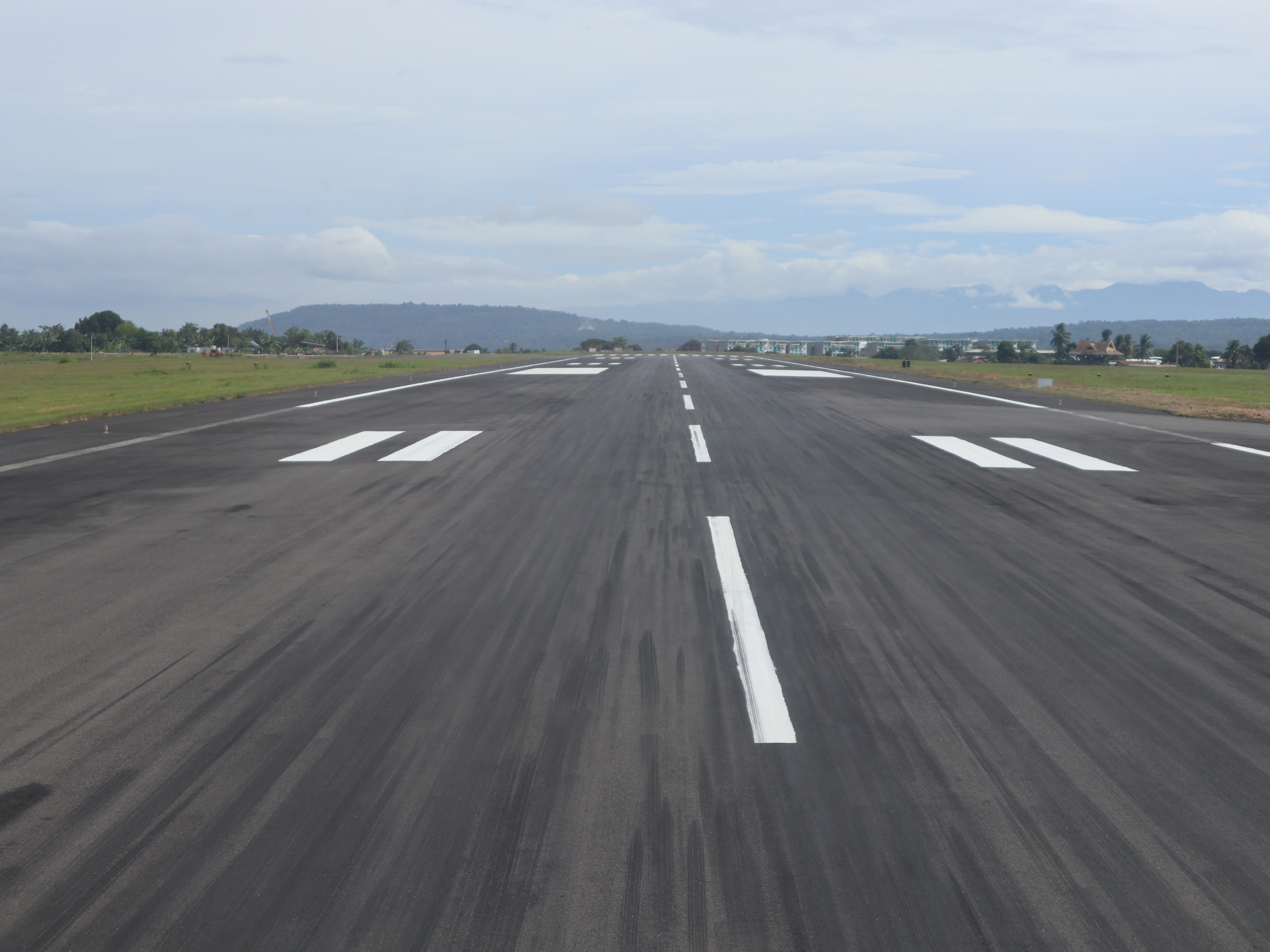
Runway

The airport has a single 3,000-meter (9,800 ft) long by 45-meter (148 ft) wide runway that can handle basically all passenger wide-bodied aircraft, including the Airbus A380. Complementing the runway are two (2) turning pads at each end of it, which help aircraft make a backtrack. The installation of a new instrument landing system (ILS) for both Runways 05 and 23 upgraded its compliance to International Civil Aviation Organization (ICAO) operating category-Precision Approach Category 1. It can accommodate 8 to 10 aircraft landings per hour, depending on size and has the equivalent 9 gate holding areas for those aircraft. The airport has two dual access taxiways. Taxiways A3 and A4 are used to access the new ramp and terminal; taxiways B and C are used for access to the old airport ramp.

The Antonov An-124 is, by far, the largest aircraft to land at the airport. It is the fourth largest aircraft in the world, next to the Boeing 747-8.

=== Other structures ===
Besides the main terminal building, there are also new support facilities like the administration building, airfield maintenance building, central plant building, hangar for military and training aircraft, and an ARFF building. It has an 800-slot car parking area and four slots for shuttle buses. It has a 3-megawatt (4,000 hp) standby power generator.

== Airlines and destinations ==
=== Passenger ===
Airlines	Destinations
Cebgo	Cagayan de Oro, Del Carmen, Iloilo, Panglao, Siargao, Tagbilaran, Zamboanga
Cebu Pacific	Bacolod, Bangkok–Don Mueang (resumes December 2, 2026), Cagayan de Oro, Caticlan, Cebu, Clark, Hong Kong, Iloilo, Manila, Panglao, Puerto Princesa, Tacloban, Zamboanga
PAL Express	Cebu, Manila, Panglao, Tagbilaran
Philippine Airlines	Manila
Qatar Airways	Doha
Scoot	Singapore
VietJet Air	Seasonal charter: Da Nang

=== Cargo ===
Airlines	Destinations
Royal Air Philippines	Nanning
Skyway Airlines	Clark

=== Destination maps ===
Destination maps
Domestic destinations from Francisco Bangoy International Airport
Passenger + cargo
Passenger only
Cargo only
Future
Seasonal/charter
International destinations from Francisco Bangoy International Airport
Passenger + cargo
Passenger only
Cargo only
Future
Seasonal/charter

== Statistics ==
Data from the Civil Aviation Authority of the Philippines (CAAP).

Year	Passenger movements				Aircraft movements				Cargo movements (in kg)			
Year	Domestic	International	Total	% change	Domestic	International	Total	% change	Domestic	International	Total	% change
2001	937,751	13,306	951,057	Steady	12,730	468	13,198	Steady	39,406,667	6,844,067	46,250,734	Steady
2002	961,990	14,441	976,431	▲2.67	11,422	460	11,882	▼9.97	44,380,469	3,519	44,383,988	▼4.04
2003	742,436	13,185	755,621	▼22.61	8,968	480	9,448	▼20.48	30,779,223	1,654	30,780,877	▼30.65
2004	1,128,653	22,573	1,151,226	▲52.35	11,366	634	12,000	▲27.01	41,972,437	—	41,972,437	▲36.36
2005	1,322,064	24,971	1,347,035	▲17.01	11,968	718	12,686	▲5.72	70,372,167	—	70,372,167	▲67.66
2006	1,307,635	34,179	1,341,814	▼0.39	12,920	1,034	13,954	▲10.00	40,753,487	—	40,753,487	▼42.09
2007	1,502,600	52,622	1,555,222	▲15.90	13,778	1,126	14,904	▲6.81	45,516,843	15,455	45,532,298	▲11.73
2008	1,646,347	46,530	1,692,877	▲8.85	15,414	780	16,194	▲8.66	53,287,642	14,931	53,302,573	▲17.0
2009	1,935,454	32,496	1,967,950	▲16.25	9,316	283	9,599	▼40.72	34,172,210	84,429	34,256,639	▼35.73
2010	2,207,684	21,493	2,229,177	▲13.27	9,692	219	9,911	▲3.25	40,568,631	63,195	40,631,826	▲18.61
2011	2,364,972	25,167	2,390,139	▲7.22	10,238	239	10,477	▲5.71	34,772,206	51,771	34,823,977	▼14.29
2012	2,923,327	39,916	2,963,243	▲23.98	25,460	634	26,094	▲149.06	42,118,391	67,392	42,185,783	▲21.14
2013	2,773,691	33,538	2,807,229	▼5.26	29,104	536	29,640	▲13.59	49,757,177	71,841	49,829,018	▲18.12
2014	3,408,487	43,992	3,452,479	▲22.99	22,822	694	23,516	▼20.66	53,714,155	76,347	53,790,502	▲7.95
2015	4,099,131	50,974	4,150,105	▲20.21	26,058	758	26,816	▲14.03	59,737,244	77,062	59,814,306	▲11.20
2016	3,462,119	91,082	3,553,201	▼14.38	32,571	1,186	33,757	▲25.88	53,590,101	68,400	53,658,501	▼10.29
2017	4,140,757	93,910	4,234,667	▲19.18	36,094	2,399	38,493	▲14.03	57,594,657	159,342	57,753,999	▲7.63
2018	4,288,408	147,149	4,435,557	▲4.74	42,740	1,595	44,335	▲15.18	78,824,575	145,262	78,969,837	▲36.73
2019	4,303,903	186,183	4,490,086	▲1.23	42,281	1,759	44,040	▼0.67	66,767,439	181,762	66,949,201	▼15.22
2020	955,824	33,265	989,089	▼77.97	16,329	370	16,699	▼62.08	33,881,735	44,385	33,926,120	▼49.33
2021	561,889	12,015	573,904	▼41.98	6,177	123	6,300	▼62.27	30,089,418	470,035	30,559,453	▼9.92
2022	2,689,261	80,285	2,769,546	▲382.58	18,137	1,044	19,181	▲204.46	35,166,751	934,141	36,100,892	▲18.13
2023	3,714,825	130,070	3,844,895	▲38.83	23,675	1,318	24,993	▲30.30	44,989,027	205,746	45,194,773	▲25.19
2024	4,164,099	174,789	4,338,888	▲12.85	27,635	1,448	29,083	▲16.36	50,739,027	459,721	51,198,748	▲13.28
2025	4,137,449	252,649	4,390,098	▲1.18	26,510	2,054	28,564	▼1.78	49,357,940	397,008	49,754,948	▼2.82

An em dash (—) is used when data from CAAP is not available.

== Access and transportation ==
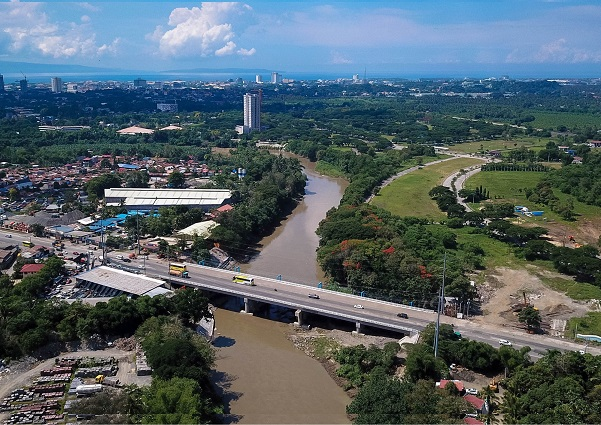
The Davao River Bridge, part of the Carlos P. Garcia National Highway

The airport is connected to the city via the Carlos P. Garcia National Highway. The four-laned La Verna-Mamay Bypass Road was constructed and finished in 2017 near the airport to decongest traffic going from Mamay road to the airport and beyond and vice versa, by avoiding the usually busy intersection of Mamay Road and the Carlos P. Garcia National Highway. To avoid widening a road, which would displace houses and creep onto the airport's site, the road splits into two for 600 meters then merges back. It has a length of 1.7 kilometers, and is able to accommodate 1,000 vehicles per day.

The planned Davao City Expressway will further connect the airport to the city via a diamond interchange. If it goes according to plan, the entire project will be completed in 2026.

== Accidents and incidents ==
- On April 19, 2000, Air Philippines Flight 541, a Boeing 737-200 en route from Manila to Davao crashed near the airport, killing 131 people.
- On March 4, 2003, a bomb exploded in the waiting shed outside the old terminal building, killing 21 people. At least 145 others were injured.
- On the night of August 25, 2008, a Philippine Air Force Lockheed L-100 Hercules bound for Iloilo City crashed into Davao Gulf shortly after takeoff. The aircraft sank 800 feet into the gulf. The incident killed nine crew members plus two Philippine Army soldiers. After several days of a search-and-retrieval operation, the wreckage was found with the help of a US Navy ship, the USNS John McDonnell.
- On June 2, 2013, Cebu Pacific Flight 971, an Airbus A320 carrying 165 passengers inbound from Manila, overshot the runway during a heavy rain. There were no fatalities, but the plane was heavily damaged.

== See also ==
- List of airports in the Philippines
- Tallest buildings in Davao City
