= History of Philippine Airlines =

Philippine Airlines (PAL) is the flag carrier of the Philippines, operating from its base at Ninoy Aquino International Airport. PAL is the oldest airline in Asia operating under its original name, having been founded in 1941.

== Beginnings (1930–1959) ==
=== Philippine Aerial Taxi Company ===
On December 3, 1930, the Philippine Aerial Taxi Company (PATCO) was established by Emanuel N. Bachrach. It commenced operations on March 18, 1931, with a round-trip flight from Manila to Iloilo. The company then had scheduled Manila-Baguio and Manila-Paracale flights. The company became dormant for six years on its scheduled passenger operation under its assigned routes. During the 1930's, the airline was based in Grace Park Airfield.

=== Philippine Air Lines ===
On February 26, 1941, Philippine Air Lines, Inc., was formally incorporated by a group of businessmen headed by Andrés Soriano Sr. At that time, he was hailed as one of the Philippines' leading industrialists and served as the airline's general manager. Soriano and former senator Ramón J. Fernández acquired the franchise of Philippine Aerial Taxi Company, Inc. and renamed Philippine Air Lines (PAL). The airline's first flight took place on March 15, 1941, with a single Beechcraft Model 18 NPC-54 on daily services between Manila (from Nielson Field) and Baguio. It carried two pilots and five passengers on its maiden flight. The five passengers were the founders of the airline – Soriano, Fernández, Juan Miguel Elizalde, John R. Schultz and Ernesto Von Kaufmann. Government investment in September 1941 paved the way for its nationalization. On October 23, 1941, John R. Schultz was elected by the board of directors as treasurer of Philippine Air Lines.

Revenue passenger-kilometers, scheduled flights only, in millions
Year	Traffic
1957	160
1960	286
1965	729
1969	1330
1971	1302
1975	2842
1980	6033

PAL services were interrupted during World War II, which lasted in the Philippines from late 1941 to 1945. Upon the outbreak of the Pacific War on December 8, 1941, the two Model 18s and its pilots were pressed into military service. They were used to evacuate American fighter pilots to Australia until one was shot down over Mindanao and the other was destroyed on the ground in an air raid in Surabaya, Indonesia.

On February 15, 1946, PAL resumed operations after a five-year hiatus with service to 15 domestic points with five Douglas DC-3s and a payroll of 108 names. Philippine Airlines returned to its original home, Nielson Field in Makati. The airport, heavily damaged during the war, was refurbished and modernized by PAL at a cost of over one million pesos, quickly becoming the official port of entry for air passengers into the Philippines. The airport was operated by Manila International Air Terminal, Inc., a wholly owned PAL subsidiary.

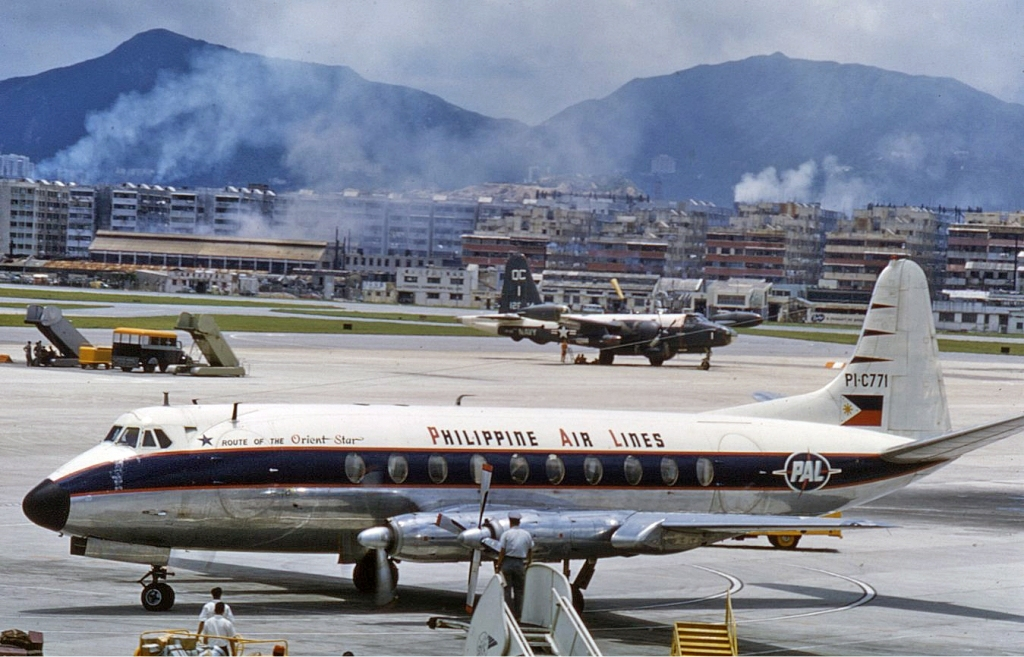
Philippine Airlines Vickers Viscount at Kai Tak Airport in 1961

On July 31, 1946, PAL became the first Asian airline to cross the Pacific Ocean when a chartered Douglas DC-4 ferried 40 American servicemen to Oakland, California, from Nielson Airport with stops in Guam, Wake Island, Johnston Atoll and Honolulu. A regular service between Manila and San Francisco started in December 1946. During this time, the airline was designated as the country's flag carrier.

PAL commenced service to Europe in 1947 with the acquisition of more Douglas DC-4s. By 1948, PAL had absorbed the only other scheduled airlines in the Philippines, Far Eastern Air Transport and Commercial Air Lines. Following the government's decision to decommission Nielson Airport and condense all aviation operations at the former U.S. Air Force base Nichols Field in Pasay, which is being converted as the new international airport for Manila, PAL was required to move its base of operations and passenger terminal there from Nielson Airport. The transfer was accomplished over a five-month period from January 31 to June 28, 1948, with PAL investing an additional P600,000 in ground installations and improvements to Nichols Field.

In 1951, PAL leased a DC-3 named Kinsei to Japan Airlines, which led to the founding of the country's own national airline. In March 1954, the Philippine government suspended all flights to Europe, Japan and the United States, only to resume five years later. In three years PAL started services to Hong Kong, Bangkok, and Taipei using Convair 340s that would later be replaced by the Vickers Viscount 784, which brought the airline into the turboprop age.

== First expansion and modernization (1960–1991) ==
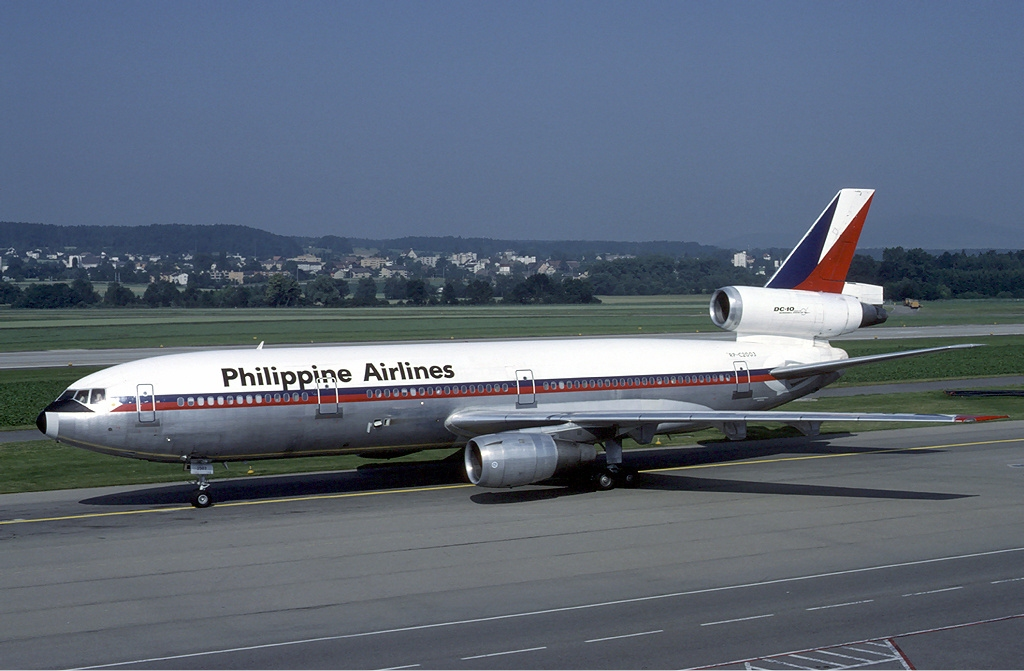
A Philippine Airlines DC-10 in Zurich. The airline operated six DC-10s, which consisted of five −30 series and one −30CF series.

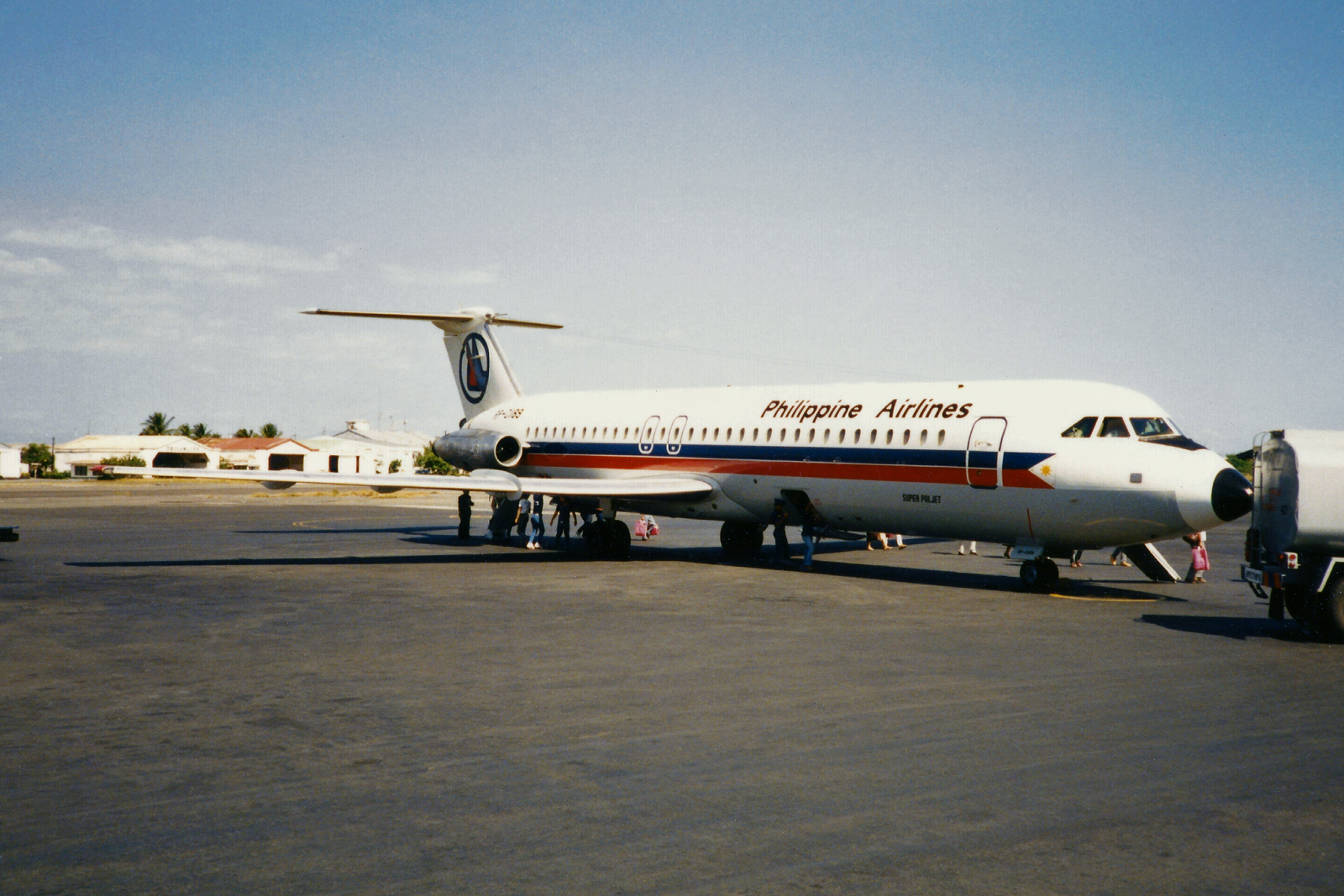
A Philippine Airlines BAC One-Eleven 500 on the ramp of the former Manila Domestic Passenger Terminal in February 1985. The One-Eleven was PAL's primary domestic jet aircraft from 1966 until the introduction of the Boeing 737-300 in 1989.

In the 1960s, PAL entered the jet age, initially with a lone Boeing 707 that was later replaced with Douglas DC-8 aircraft leased from KLM Royal Dutch Airlines, used for long-haul international flights to Europe and the United States. The airline's 5 millionth passenger was flown aboard a DC-3 "El Economico" service. The DC-3 remained the mainstay of domestic services as it expanded to a total of 72 points as airports were improved or opened, but most of the airline's rural air service was later stopped in May 1964. Two years later, PAL commenced its first jet services to Cebu, Bacolod, and Davao using the BAC One-Eleven, which also saw use on the service to Bali, Indonesia, starting in 1969. In addition, PAL was privatized, as the Philippine government relinquished its share in PAL after Benigno Toda Jr., then-PAL chairman, acquired a majority stake in the airline.

A year after the declaration of martial law in 1972, the re-elected Ferdinand Marcos Sr, now serving a second presidential term, issued monopolizing decrees in the form of Letters of Instruction (LOI) nos. 151 and 151-A, which were known as the "one-airline policy". PAL was the lone surviving airline, absorbing Air Manila and Filipinas Orient Airways. On March 10, 1973, PAL was re-designated as the national flag carrier. PAL continued its expansion with the arrival of its first McDonnell Douglas DC-10 on July 17, 1974, which was primarily utilized on the Manila to San Francisco route via Honolulu.

In 1975, Philippine Airlines was headquartered at the PAL Building in Makati. The Philippine government re-nationalized PAL in 1977, with the Government Service Insurance System holding a majority of PAL shares.

Between 1979 and 1981, PAL built a series of mammoth aviation-related facilities around the periphery of the MIA as part of a comprehensive modernization program led by then-PAL President Roman A. Cruz. These included the PAL Technical Center, the PAL Inflight Center, the PAL Data Center, and the PAL Aviation School. Within this period, PAL achieved service successes, after being the first airline to be honored by Les Chaines de Rotisseurs, an ancient order of gourmets, with an award for its inflight cuisine.

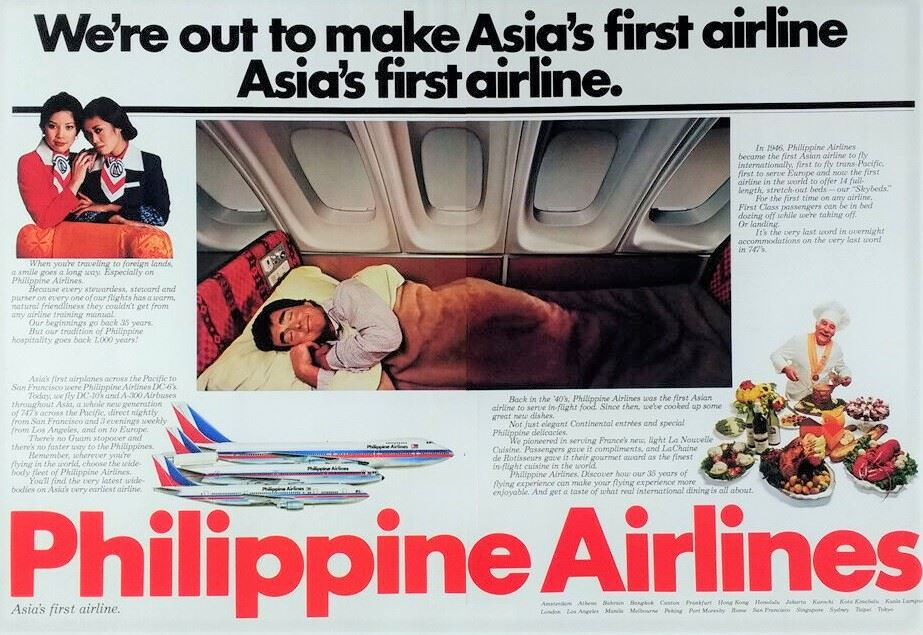
Philippine Airlines advertisement (1981)

1979 saw the arrival of new aircraft types such as the Airbus A300B4 (dubbed the Love Bus) on November 30 and the Boeing 747-200B (dubbed the Jumbo Jet) on December 24. PAL's 747s gained distinction for the Cloud Nine first class cabins on their upper decks, which were configured with 14 sleeping berths, known as "Skybeds", that were certified for use during take-off and landing.

On January 4, 1980, Philippine Airlines began operating the Manila-Honolulu-San Francisco route with the Boeing 747-200B. The type completely replaced the DC-10s on transpacific services by March 3. The 747s were later adorned with the slogan "Hooray for Hollywood" to commemorate the start of a new service to Los Angeles via Honolulu on December 17.

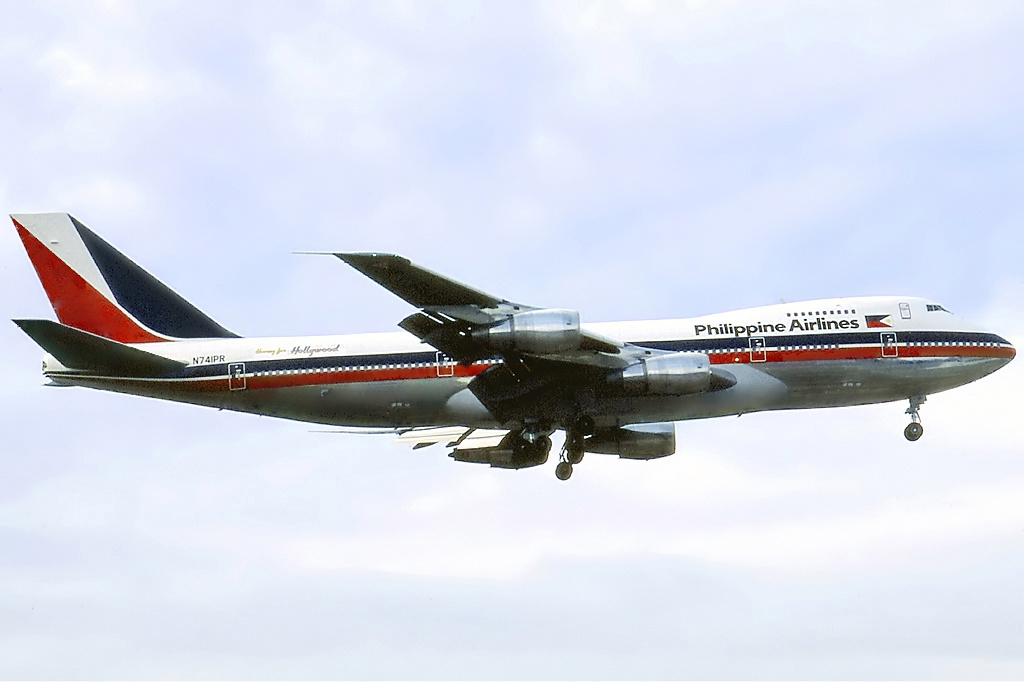
A Philippine Airlines Boeing 747-200 wearing the livery used from the 1970s until the mid-1980s with the added "Hooray for Hollywood" slogan promoting flights to Los Angeles

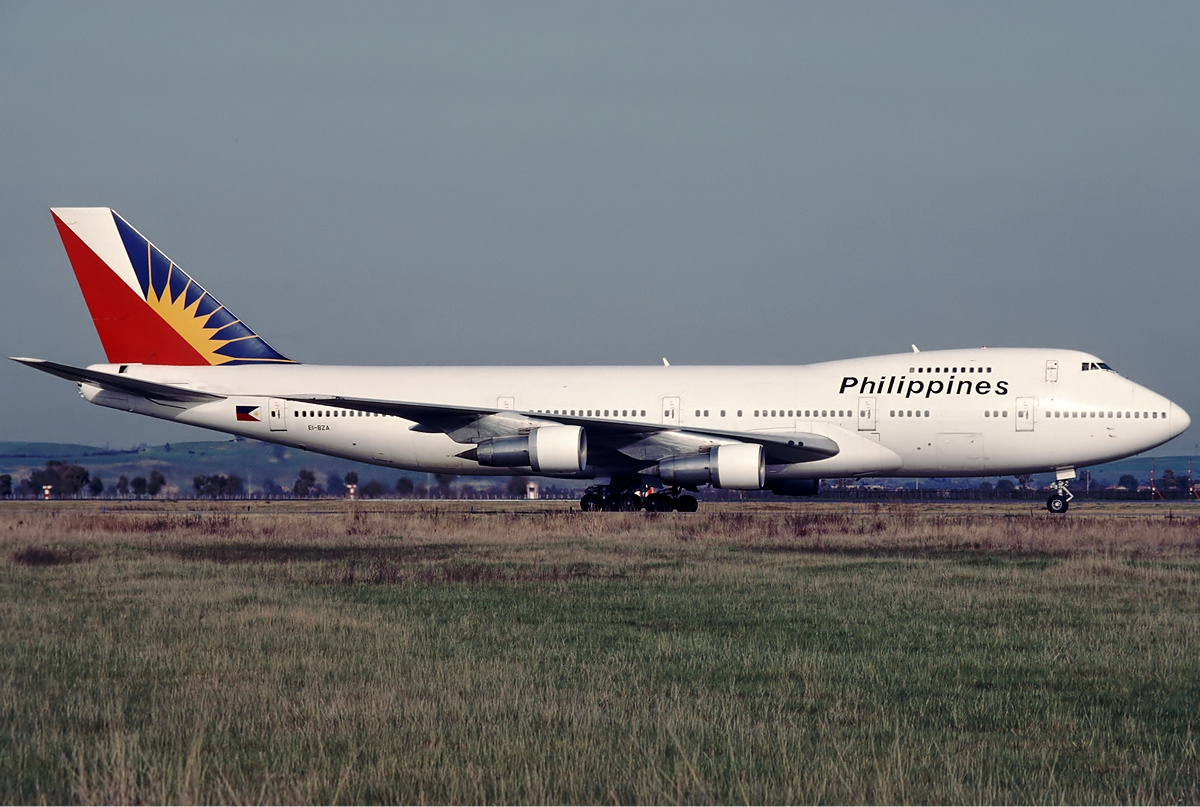
A similar 747-200 wearing the current "Sunriser" livery (introduced in 1986) at Rome Fiumicino Airport in March 1989

On April 2, 1982, a PAL Boeing 747-200B arriving from San Francisco via Honolulu became the first aircraft to dock at the new 800-million peso Terminal 1 of Manila International Airport. PAL would later strengthen its cargo-handling capability by building a dedicated cargo terminal adjacent to the MIA passenger terminal and installing cargo-refrigeration equipment in 1983. The new facilities, which catered mainly to international cargo services, enabled PAL to become a fully equipped cargo handler. Services to Paris and Zürich began in November 1982. For a brief period in the 1980s, PAL's routes to San Francisco and Los Angeles had a stopover in Tokyo.

The latter half of the 1980s saw Roman Cruz's resignation to President Cory Aquino on the last day of the 1986 EDSA Revolution and the abolishment of Marcos's one-airline policy in 1988. Cruz's successor, Dante G. Santos, launched a massive fleet restructuring, which primarily focused on modernizing the domestic fleet through the acquisition of the Short 360, nicknamed The Sunriser, in May 1987, the Fokker 50 in August 1988, and the Boeing 737-300 jet in August 1989. Coinciding with the change in management was the introduction of the airline's Sunriser corporate identity designed by Landor Associates in 1986, which remains in use today.

On September 14, 1987, PAL undertook the biggest aircraft overhaul in its history with its first in-house 747 D-check at its technical center in Manila. The overhaul, conducted on a 747-200B (registration serial N743PR), involved reconfiguration of the aircraft's cabin and repainting with the new Sunriser livery. The airframe was airworthy by October 1987.

International services were expanded throughout the late 1980s with the opening of services to Riyadh in March 1987 and the acquisition of ex-Scandinavian Airlines Boeing 747-200s from Guinness Peat Aviation between November 1987 and September 1988 to increase service frequencies on transpacific and European routes. Expatriate pilots were temporarily hired to operate the secondhand 747s until March 1988 while the airline familiarized and trained their dedicated pilots with the new aircraft, which had significantly different parts and systems from the airlines' previous batch of 747s acquired directly from Boeing. This decision was met with accusations of unfair labor practices from the Airline Pilots Association of the Philippines (ALPAP), citing the foreign pilots receiving a higher salary than those hired by PAL.

As the Manila domestic passenger terminal outgrew its capacity and ramp aircraft parking space became more scarce, PAL leased the hangar of the Philippine Aerospace Development Corporation and converted it into the PAL Domestic Terminal 2. The terminal, which opened in October 1988, exclusively served passengers flying to destinations serviced by PAL's Airbus A300s: namely, Cebu and Davao, with General Santos and Puerto Princesa added later on. At the same time, PAL also expanded and improved the existing terminal. The opening of the new facility cleared out the old terminal and provided greater convenience to passengers.

PAL ended the 1980s and started the 1990s with evacuation flights to Manila for Filipinos stranded abroad. On June 10, 1989, A McDonnell Douglas DC-10 picked up Filipino citizens in Beijing in light of unrest brought about by the Tiananmen Square massacre. A month later on August 7, a Boeing 747-200 was sent to Damascus to rescue 196 overseas Filipino workers (OFWs) who had fled from Lebanon during the closing stages of the Lebanese Civil War. More evacuation flights were mounted from August 13 to September 24, 1990, using 747s to repatriate OFWs in countries affected by the Gulf War.

== Re-privatization and second expansion (1992–1997) ==
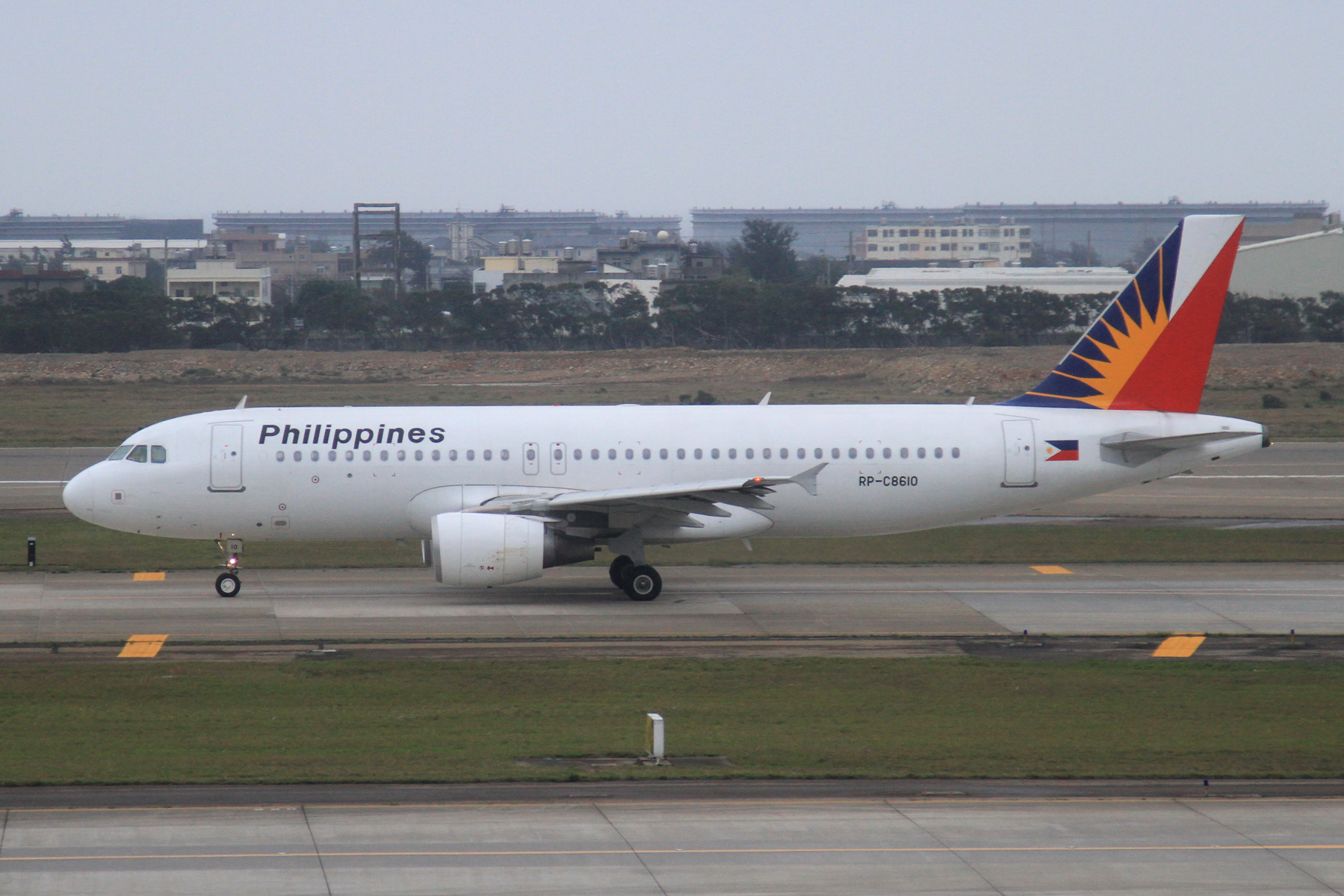
A Philippine Airlines A320 at Taoyuan International Airport. The A320 is one of PAL's first narrow body aircraft.

PAL was privatized again in January 1992, when the government sold 67% share of PAL to a holding company called PR Holdings Inc. However, a conflict as to who would lead PAL led to a compromise in 1993, when former Agriculture Secretary Carlos G. Dominguez was elected as the PAL president by the airline's board of directors. The fleet of BAC1-11s were retired in May 1992, following the completion of the deliveries of Boeing 737s, and the Short 360s in September. In November 1993, PAL acquired its first Boeing 747-400. The new aircraft arrived at Subic Bay International Airport and was carrying then-President Fidel V. Ramos, who was headed home from the United States after an official visit. The 400-ton aircraft, one of the world's largest and most popular long-range aircraft was a mainstay of PAL's trans-Pacific services and its flagship aircraft until it was retired in 2014. A new service between Manila and Osaka, launched in 1994, brought the number of points to 34 in PAL's international route network.

The PAL Domestic Terminal 2 was refurbished in 1995, with a number of facilities being added or improved, including a renovated Mabuhay Lounge, an exclusive check-in counter for Mabuhay Class passengers, an express counter, refreshment bar, a medical clinic, an expansive waiting lounge and two baggage carousels in the arrival section. PAL facilities at NAIA were also renovated. The total cost for the renovation of the domestic terminal (1 and 2) reached P33.15 million.

In January 1995, Lucio C. Tan, the majority shareholder of PR Holdings Inc., became the new chairman and CEO of the airline. The delivery of the carrier's fourth Boeing 747-400 in April 1996 signalled the start of an ambitious US$4 billion modernization and re-fleeting program that aimed to make PAL one of Asia's best airlines within three years. The centerpiece of the program was the acquisition of 36 state-of-the-art aircraft from Airbus and Boeing between 1996 and 1999. The re-fleeting sought to give PAL the distinction of having the youngest fleet in Asia and allow the expansion of its domestic and international route network. The 36 orders of PAL during its re-fleeting program were for eight Boeing 747-400's, four Airbus A340-300's, two Airbus A340-200s, eight Airbus A330-300's and twelve Airbus A320-200's. The re-fleeting program enabled PAL to be dubbed the first airline in the world to operate the full range of new-generation Airbus aircraft.

== Asian financial crisis (1997–1999) ==
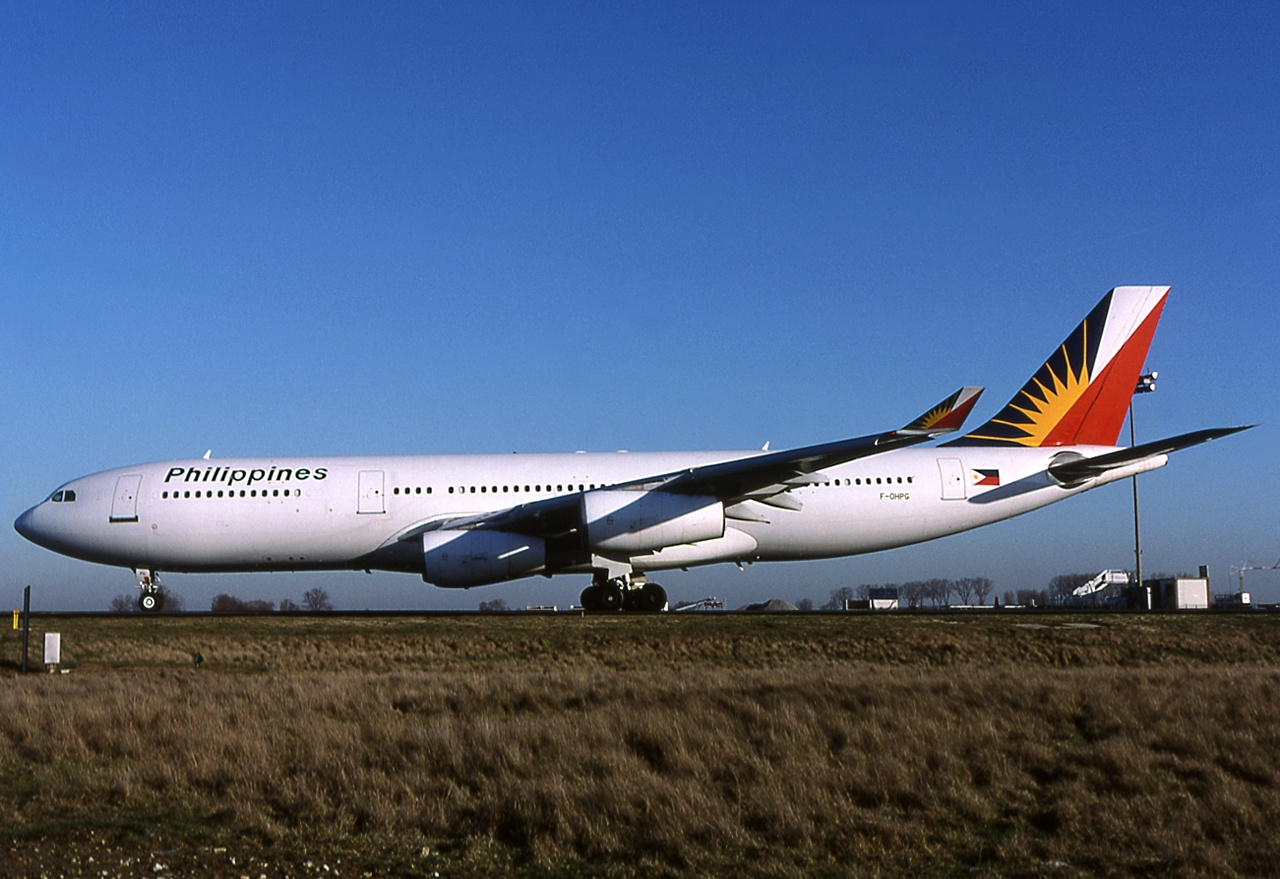
A Philippine Airlines Airbus A340-200 at Charles de Gaulle International Airport in January 1998

In 1997, PAL rebranded itself as "Asia's Sunniest" to cap its new marketing and advertising thrust. PAL also commenced services to New York City, using the Newark Liberty International Airport via Vancouver International Airport. The acquisition of too many aircraft matched with unprofitable routes forced the airline into financial instability. The re-fleeting program was about halfway through when the full impact of the 1997 Asian financial crisis struck the airline industry early in 1998. By March 31, 1999, PAL dismantled its Mactan–Cebu International Airport hub. With massive lay-offs also taking place, disputes between the airline's owners and the employee's union led to a complete shutdown of PAL's operations on September 23, 1998. Cathay Pacific temporarily took over PAL's domestic and international operations during its fourteen-day shutdown, with Cathay Pacific also showing interest in acquiring a 40-percent stake in PAL during this period. However, no agreement was reached with the Hong Kong-based airline.

PAL resumed operations on October 7, 1998, after an agreement between PAL employees and top management, reported to be facilitated by Philippine President Joseph Estrada, was reached, with services to 15 domestic points out of Manila. On October 29, the flag carrier resumed international services with flights to Los Angeles and San Francisco, with other international services being restored three weeks later. Asian services resumed on November 11 with flights to Tokyo and Hong Kong. PAL gradually expanded its network over the next two months, restoring services to Taipei, Osaka (via Cebu), Singapore, Fukuoka, Dhahran, Riyadh and Seoul. With the aviation industry still in the doldrums, PAL continued to search for a strategic partner, but in the end, it submitted a "standalone" rehabilitation plan to the SEC on December 7, 1998. The plan provides a sound basis for the airline to undertake a recovery on its own while keeping the door open to the entry of a strategic partner in the future. PAL presented the new proposed rehabilitation plan to its major creditors during a two-week marathon meeting that started on February 14 in Washington D.C. and ended on March 1 in Hong Kong.

In 1999, PAL submitted its amended rehabilitation plan to the Philippines' Securities and Exchange Commission that comprised a revised business plan and a revised financial restructuring plan. The plan also required the infusion of US$200 million in new equity, with 40% to 60% coming from financial investors and translating to no less than 90% ownership of PAL. That same year, with the unprecedented boom in air travel, PAL operations were moved to the then-new Terminal 2 of Ninoy Aquino International Airport. The terminal, named as the Centennial Terminal in commemoration of 100 years of Philippine independence, is located at the site of the original MIA terminal building from 1961 to 1972. On August 9, 1999, PAL moved selected domestic flights to the P5.3 billion terminal. Full domestic operations operated from the new terminal on August 10, while international services followed soon after, thus consolidating PAL's flight operations in one terminal for the first time.

== Receivership and rehabilitation (2000–2008) ==
In 2000, PAL finally returned to profitability, making some ₱44.2 million in its first year of rehabilitation, breaking some six years of heavy losses. On September 1, 2000, PAL formally handed over its ownership of its maintenance and engineering division to German-led joint venture Lufthansa Technik Philippines (LTP), the world's largest provider of aircraft maintenance services in accordance with the provisions of its rehabilitation plan, which mandates the disposal of the airline's non-core assets. In August of the same year, PAL opened an e-mail booking facility. In 2001, PAL continued to gain a net profit of P419 million in its second year of rehabilitation. In that year alone, PAL restored services to Bangkok, Taipei, Sydney, Busan, Jakarta, Vancouver and Ho Chi Minh City, while launching new services to Shanghai and Melbourne. A year later, PAL restored services to Guam and Tagbilaran.

Like other airlines, PAL was severely affected by the September 11 attacks in 2001. In 2003, PAL was restructured again.

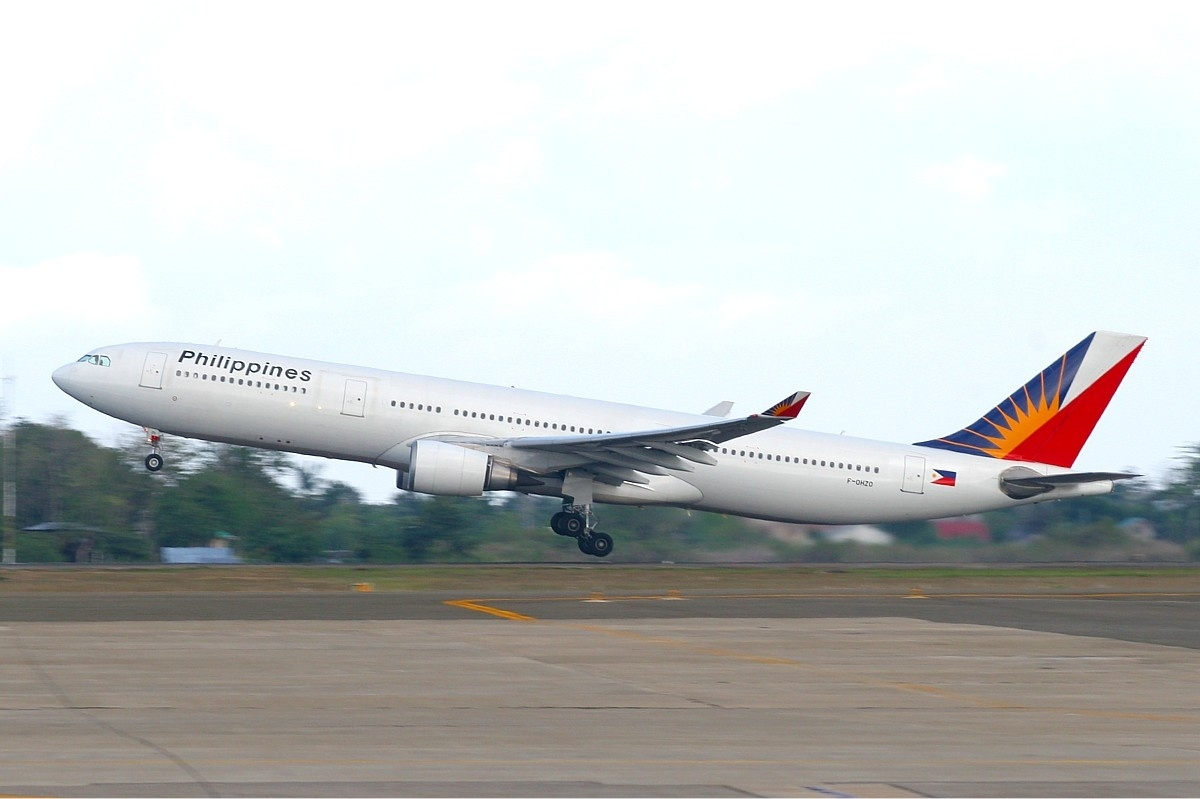
A Philippine Airlines Airbus A330-300 in 2005

The Mabuhay Miles frequent flyer program was launched in 2002, combining PAL's former frequent flyer programs, PALSmiles, Mabuhay Club, and the Flying Sportsman (now SportsPlus) all into one. The PAL RHUSH (Rapid Handling of Urgent Shipments) Cargo service was also re-launched during the same year. An online arrival and departure facility and a new booking system was then launched in 2003. In December, PAL also acquired a fifth Boeing 747-400.

In 2004, PAL launched services to Las Vegas to mark its 63rd year of service. PAL also returned to Laoag and started services to Macau on codeshare with Air Macau. In that same year, PAL entered into code share agreements with Air France and KLM Royal Dutch Airlines for services to Paris and Amsterdam, respectively. Code share service to Paris was cut due to the merging of the two European airlines and the formation of Air France-KLM. Service to Amsterdam remained, operated by KLM. PAL also continued an overhaul of its fleet with the arrival of two new Airbus A320-214s and continued modernizing its ticketing systems with the launch of electronic ticketing. For the first time in Philippine history, the airline flew President-elect Gloria Macapagal Arroyo and Vice-President-elect, now ABS-CBN journalist Noli de Castro to their inauguration in Cebu City. Arroyo rode a chartered PAL Airbus A330-300, while de Castro was aboard a separate Airbus A320-200.

In March 2005, PAL started services to Nagoya and restored scheduled flights to Beijing after a 15-year hiatus. In response to rival Cebu Pacific's increasing domestic market share, mainly due to its massive re-fleeting program and its own aging Boeing 737 fleet, PAL signed an agreement for the purchase and lease of up to 18 Airbus A319-112s and A320-214s from Airbus and GE Capital Aviation Services (GECAS) on December 6, 2005.

The first brand-new, GECAS-leased Airbus A319-112s were delivered to and inaugurated by PAL and President Arroyo on October 20, 2006. It was the first aircraft in the airline's history to offer AVOD-capable inflight entertainment on its Mabuhay Class cabin. In December, the airline initiated its wide-body re-fleeting program by signing a deal with Boeing for the purchase of two Boeing 777-300ER aircraft to be delivered in 2009, with an option for two more planes in 2011. PAL also signed a separate agreement with GECAS to lease another two Boeing 777-300ER aircraft for delivery in 2010. The purchase of the new 777-300ERs effectively cancelled previous orders for new 747-400s, ending the production of said aircraft. PAL later signed a memorandum of understanding that opens the way for the introduction of flights to the southwestern Chinese city of Chongqing. Service to Chongqing began on March 14, 2008, while service to Chengdu commenced on March 18, though the routes have been terminated after the 2008 Sichuan earthquake.

Philippine Airlines was named "Airline Turnaround of the Year" for 2006 and 2007 by the Centre for Asia Pacific Aviation for its "strategic contribution to the aviation industry through a significant transformation by successfully restructuring its operations through innovative cost-cutting measures resulting in operating profits".

== Post-receivership history (2008–2011) ==
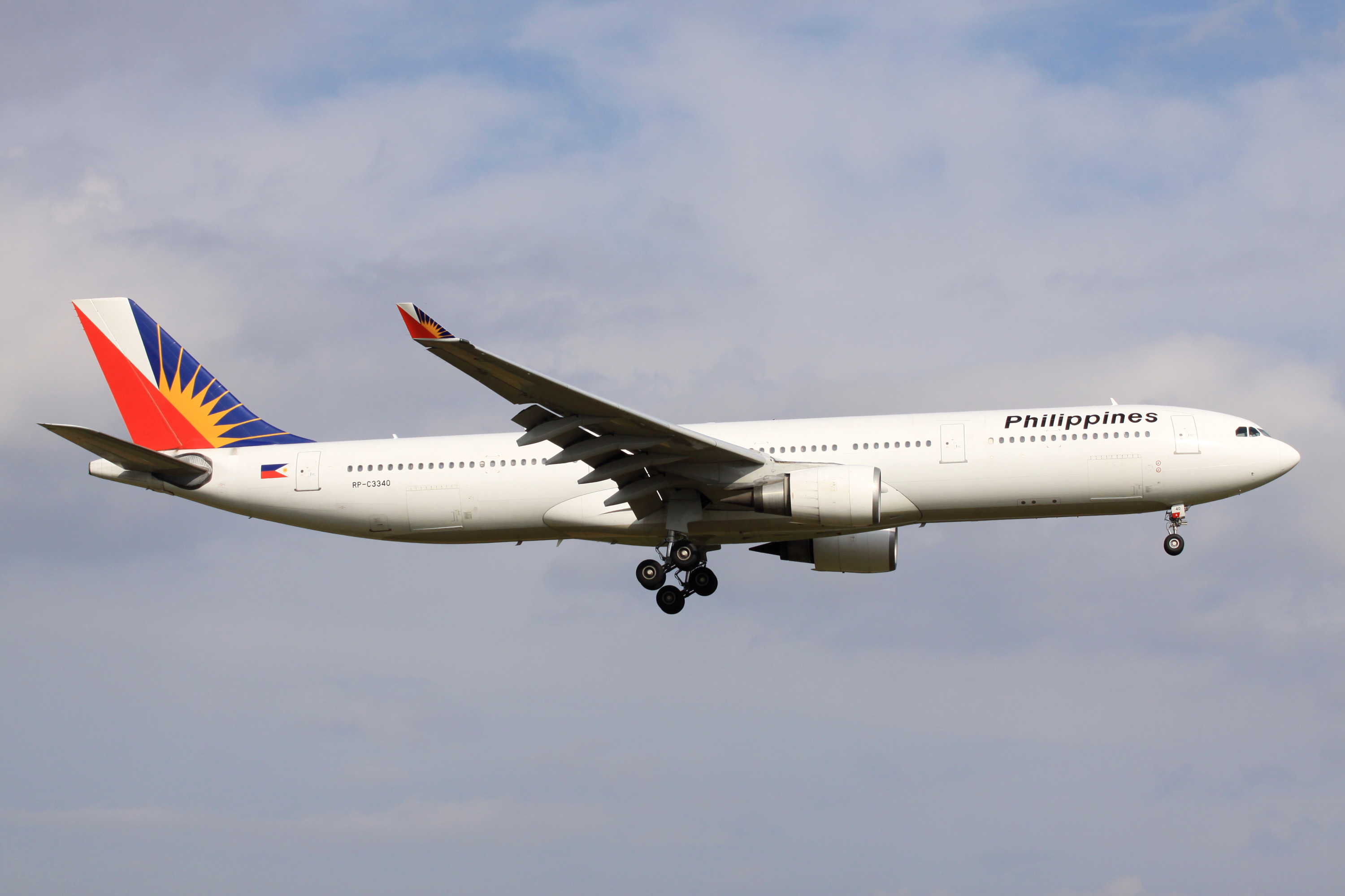
Philippine Airlines Airbus A330-300 at Narita International Airport in 2009

On October 4, 2007, nine years after being financially crippled by the Asian financial crisis and subsequent downturns in the aviation industry, and after reporting a net income of ₱6.79 billion (US$140.3 million) which was the airline's largest profit at the time in its history, the Securities and Exchange Commission ordered the release of PAL from receivership. The airline immediately announced plans to attract foreign investments through an international road show to tour around Asia, Europe and North America. PAL continued its ambitious expansion plans, launching regional subsidiary PAL Express on April 10, 2008, to supersede the financially troubled Air Philippines, with a $150 million order for three 50-seat Bombardier Q300 and six 78-seat Bombardier Q400 aircraft from Bombardier Aerospace. PAL Express operations began on May 5 with eight flights daily between Manila and Boracay, while hub operations from Mactan–Cebu International Airport commenced on May 19 with flights between Cebu and five points in the Visayas and Mindanao. Services to other destinations, including many destinations formerly served by PAL prior to the Asian financial crisis, began in June and July 2008. PAL Express was originally to be primarily based in Cebu and fly intra-regional routes in the Visayas and Mindanao, as well as secondary routes to smaller airports in island provinces. In response to rising competition from Cebu Pacific and Zest Airways, PAL Express rebranded itself as Airphil Express on March 28, 2010, under a low-cost model. The PAL Express name was restored as part of the airline's expansion strategy, effectively rendering the Airphil Express brand defunct on March 15, 2013.

Despite PAL's successful exit from receivership, international safety concerns regarding the Philippine aviation industry severely hindered its expansion plans. In January 2008, the United States Federal Aviation Administration downgraded the Philippines' aviation safety rating from Category 1 to Category 2 in January 2008, preventing PAL from increasing its flights to the United States from 33 per week or from switching the type of aircraft used unless the airline undertakes a wet-lease agreement with a different carrier. The FAA decision effectively stalled PAL's previously announced intentions to expand its presence in the US market with routes to San Diego, Seattle, Chicago, Saipan and New York City. On March 30, 2010, Philippines-based carriers were placed in an EU aviation blacklist, banning PAL from flying to any European destinations. Nonetheless, PAL continued its route expansion plans in the Asia-Pacific region, resuming services to Riyadh with a four times weekly Boeing 747 service four years after it was suspended, as well as adding a twice weekly Airbus A330 service to Brisbane and three-times-weekly service to New Delhi via Bangkok. However, the expansion proved unprofitable and all three routes were cancelled. Flights to Brisbane and Riyadh were suspended in 2011, and the Manila-Bangkok-Delhi route ended in 2013.

Despite these hindrances on its expansion, PAL went ahead with its widebody re-fleeting program, receiving its first two Boeing 777-300ER aircraft on November 19, 2009, and January 2010 respectively, and another two leased from GECAS in 2010. Due to the inability for PAL to further expand its long-haul network, the airline used the 777 on its existing long-haul routes including Tokyo, Los Angeles and Vancouver. The 777-300ER jet features 370 seats in a two-class configuration (42 flat business class seats in a 2-3-2 layout and 328 economy class seats in a 3-4-3 layout), and is also PAL's first aircraft to feature AVOD in-flight entertainment in all classes (later retrofitted in its 747-400 fleet).

=== Labor disputes ===
In July 2010, 25 of Philippine Airlines' pilots resigned and left to seek employment abroad without informing the airline. After calls to return to work by both the airline and Philippine Government, PAL subsequently sought to file charges against the pilots involved for breach of contract. In the same month, PAL announced that it would be outsourcing jobs, with retrenchments resulting. Disputes with flight attendants, ground crew, airport staff as well as reservation agents escalated, with threats of potentially disruptive strike action, which took place on October 27, 2010. On November 12, the Department of Labor and Employment approved the lay-off of 2,600 employees of Philippine Airlines.

== Entry of San Miguel Corporation (2012–2014) ==
On April 4, 2012, San Miguel Corporation bought a 49-percent stake in Philippine Airlines for $500 million as part of a strategy to move away from its beer and food businesses. San Miguel, one of the Philippines' biggest conglomerates, said it planned to help modernise and strengthen PAL, renew its aging fleet and restore its competitiveness in the Asian aviation industry. San Miguel president Ramon Ang also announced intentions to join a global airline alliance.

PAL's first major initiative under San Miguel ownership was confirmed on August 28, 2012, with a $7 billion order for 54 Airbus aircraft, comprising 44 Airbus A321 (including 10 A321neo) and 10 Airbus A330-300, with options for 10 more. The A321 was ordered to enhance domestic and regional routes, while the A330-300s are to be flown on Australian, Middle Eastern and some European routes. PAL's original fleet of 8 A330s were transferred to PAL Express in response to Cebu Pacific announcing intentions to compete with PAL on mid-to-long-haul routes. PAL exercised its option to purchase a further 10 A330-300 for $2.5 billion on September 28. PAL took delivery of its first aircraft under this order in 2013.

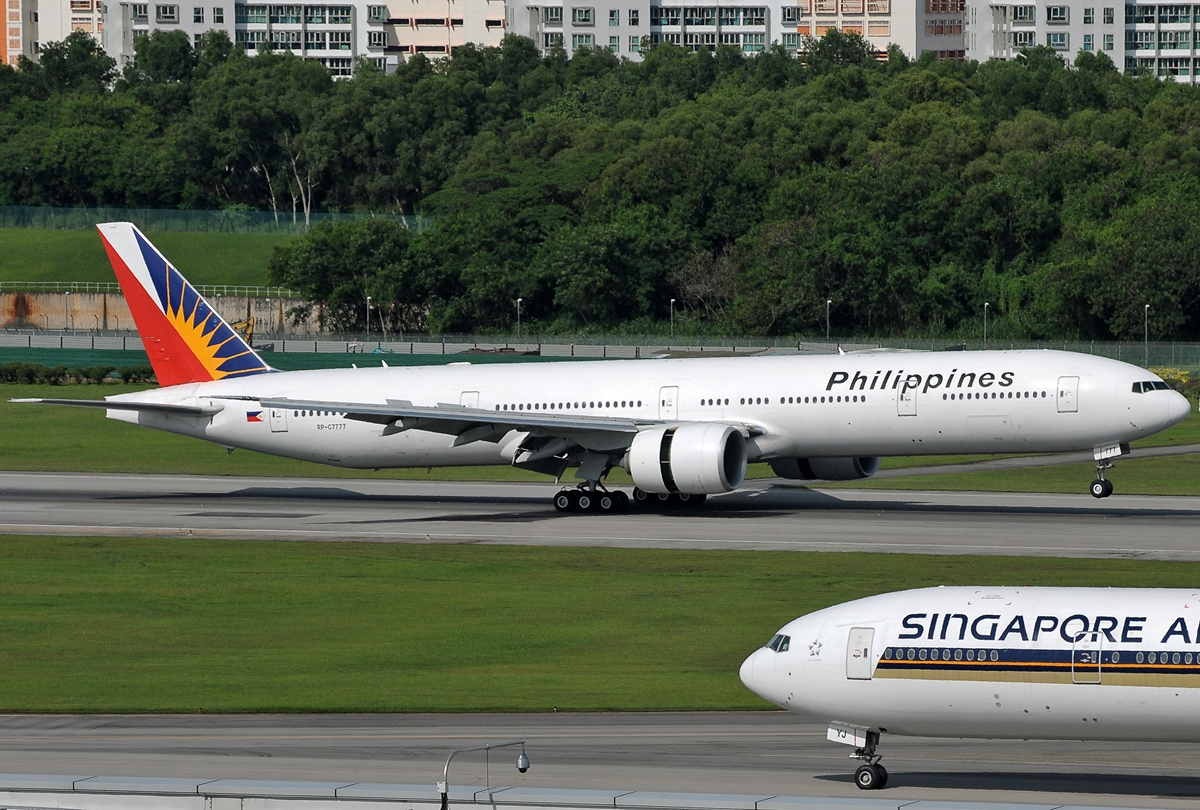
A Philippine Airlines Boeing 777-300ER at Changi Airport in 2012

Under San Miguel's management, PAL embarked on expanding its route network, involving both adding new and restoring previously terminated routes. In 2013, the airline announced its return to Abu Dhabi, Dammam and Riyadh, and launched new routes to Brisbane and Perth (via Darwin), as well as Doha and Jeddah. In July 2013, PAL was removed from the EU aviation blacklist, and the carrier immediately announced its European plans. On November 4, it launched flights to London, marking its return to Europe after fifteen years. After the United States Federal Aviation Administration (FAA) upgraded the Philippines' aviation safety rating to Category 1 in April 2014, PAL upgraded its US flights to the modern and fuel-efficient Boeing 777-300ER, replacing the aging 747-400. PAL retired its last 747-400 on September 1, 2014.

In addition to its fleet modernization and route expansion, PAL announced plans to become an investor within the aviation industry following San Miguel's partial acquisition. In November 2012, the airline entered into negotiations with Cayman Airways for a 50 percent equity share in the Caribbean-based airline. Under the deal, Cayman Airways will issue new preferred shares to PAL's majority shareholder, San Miguel Corporation. As part of the proposed scheme, Cayman Airways will use the fresh capital to acquire new aircraft which will then be leased out to Philippine Airlines under a wet lease agreement. The planes will be registered and domiciled in the Cayman Islands, and to be flown, operated and maintained completely by Cayman Airways. In April 2013, PAL entered a joint venture with the Cambodian conglomerate Royal Group of Cambodia, headed by Kith Meng to launch a new incarnation Cambodia Airlines with a 49% share. The new airline was originally expected to commence operations by June, however no services have been launched as of September.

On August 30, 2012, PAL president Ramon Ang announced its intention to build a second international airport to service Metro Manila. Citing the need to relieve pressure on the congested and outdated Ninoy Aquino International Airport and the unreasonable 90-kilometer (56 mi) distance from the Philippine government's favoured second airport option at Clark, Ang announced that the airline was in negotiations with a Korean contractor to build the airport on a 2,000-hectare (4,900-acre) site, initially with two runways, eventually expanding to four, in a yet-undisclosed location north of Metro Manila. In March 2013, PAL postponed the project indefinitely citing government restrictions on airline corporate ownership of Philippine airports. However, on July 12, 2013, Ang stated that PAL was 'still looking to build' a new airport and were '100% sure' that the project would eventuate, although plans had yet to be finalised.

In a disclosure to the Philippine Stock Exchange on September 8, 2014, San Miguel stated that it has signed an agreement "whereby [San Miguel] expressed willingness to sell its 49% stake to the group of Dr. Lucio Tan, and the latter has expressed willingness to buy the said 49% stake." It added the deal is "subject to the fulfillment of certain conditions." Informed sources said San Miguel gave Tan a week to raise $1 billion to acquire the stake. The final transaction amounted to $1.3 billion and was completed a week later on September 15. In a disclosure to the Philippine Stock Exchange the following day, San Miguel said Tan assumed day-to-day management of PAL through the appointment of its former president, Jaime Bautista, as general manager. However, it maintained that Ang, as president of PAL, remains, along with the rest of his team, "until the relevant closing date of the agreement" between the parties. On October 15, 2014, Ang officially stepped down as president and COO.

== Return of Lucio Tan and continued expansion (2014–2020) ==
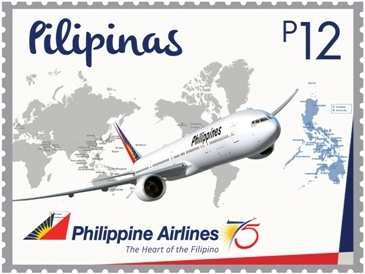
A commemorative stamp of the 75th anniversary of Philippine Airlines issued in 2016

On October 23, 2014, Philippine Airlines announced the appointment of Bautista as the new president and COO of Philippine Airlines. Under Bautista's rule, Philippine Airlines deferred the deliveries of the Airbus A321neo that was supposed to be delivered from November 2017, under the San Miguel management. The strategic move minimised the risk of an overcapacity with single aisle aircraft in the PAL fleet. Jaime Bautista also announced plans to replace its A340 fleet, with the choice of a new and modern Airbus A350 XWB or Boeing 787 Dreamliner. In addition to new aircraft, PAL has chosen to lease more 777s for its growing long haul flights.

In January 2015, Philippine Airlines became the official carrier of Pope Francis throughout his apostolic trip in the Philippines. The aircraft boarded by the pontiff was named "Shepherd One". The airline flew the pope to the city of Tacloban and, as per traditional protocol, flew him back to Ciampino Airport in Rome, Italy from Manila.

In March 2015, coinciding with the 74th anniversary of the carrier, Philippine Airlines resumed flights to New York City via the John F. Kennedy International Airport with a stopover in Vancouver from Manila. The airline previously flew to New York via Newark Liberty International Airport, but cancelled the route in 1997 following the Asian financial crisis. Philippine Airlines originally utilized the Airbus A340 for its flights, but in October 2015, it upgraded to the larger and fuel-efficient Boeing 777-300ER to increase seat capacity for flights to New York. In addition, Philippine Airlines expanded to the Oceania region by introducing flights to Auckland, New Zealand (via Cairns, Australia) and Port Moresby in Papua New Guinea. Philippine Airlines' global expansion and new routes also made the airline among nine out of the sixteen publicly traded Southeast Asian carriers to be profitable, having kept a $120 million profit. It was ranked the fourth profitable overall and second profitable full-service carrier in Southeast Asia, according to the Centre for Asia Pacific Aviation.

In June 2015, Philippine Airlines renewed its partnership with Lufthansa Technik Philippines for a two-year base and heavy maintenance checks for its Airbus fleet.

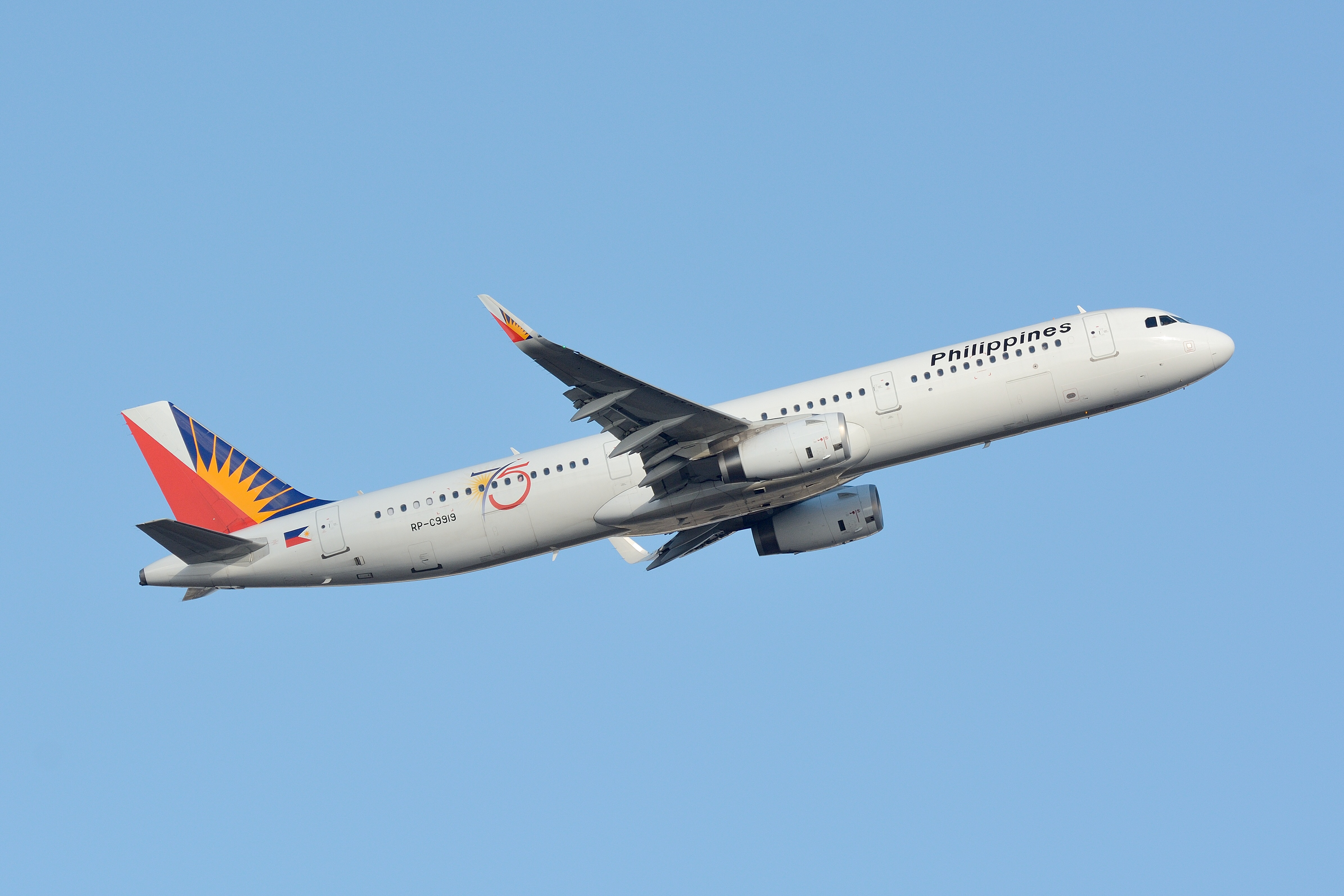
An Airbus A321 of Philippine Airlines with the '75' decal at Narita International Airport. To celebrate its 75th anniversary, PAL placed a '75' decal on its planes.

In March 2016, on Philippine Airlines' 75th anniversary, it introduced a new campaign called The Heart of the Filipino. The campaign was aggressively undertaken, with the launch of new advertisements which are endorsed by The Voice of the Philippines judges: singers Bamboo Mañalac, Lea Salonga, and Sarah Geronimo, as well as the Miss Universe 2015 winner, Pia Wurtzbach. The airline adopted a new theme song, which incorporates the vocals of Mañalac, Salonga, and Geronimo. The lyrics famously includes the old PAL slogan "Shining Through," reminiscing on PAL's successful campaign in the 1980s. The airline also released a new pre-flight safety demonstration video in conjunction with The Heart of the Filipino campaign, called Heart of The Nation, in February 2017. The video featured various tourist destinations in the Philippines with locals from those destinations demonstrating the safety guidelines.

Philippine Airlines continued its expansion by augmenting its international and domestic flights. In 2016, the airline started flying to Doha, Kuwait City (via Dubai), and launched direct flights between Cebu City and Los Angeles. In 2018, it started flying to Nanning and Sapporo. It also upgraded its flights to Toronto, Brisbane, and New York City; these were previously served via stopovers. The airline also launched new flights to Clark, making Clark International Airport its second regional hub after Mactan–Cebu International Airport. However, the airline indefinitely suspended flights to Kuwait, Jeddah, and Darwin, as well as the route from Cebu City to Los Angeles, citing low demand. It attempted to resume flights to New Delhi in March 2019, but deferred it amidst India–Pakistan border tensions before ultimately being shelved.

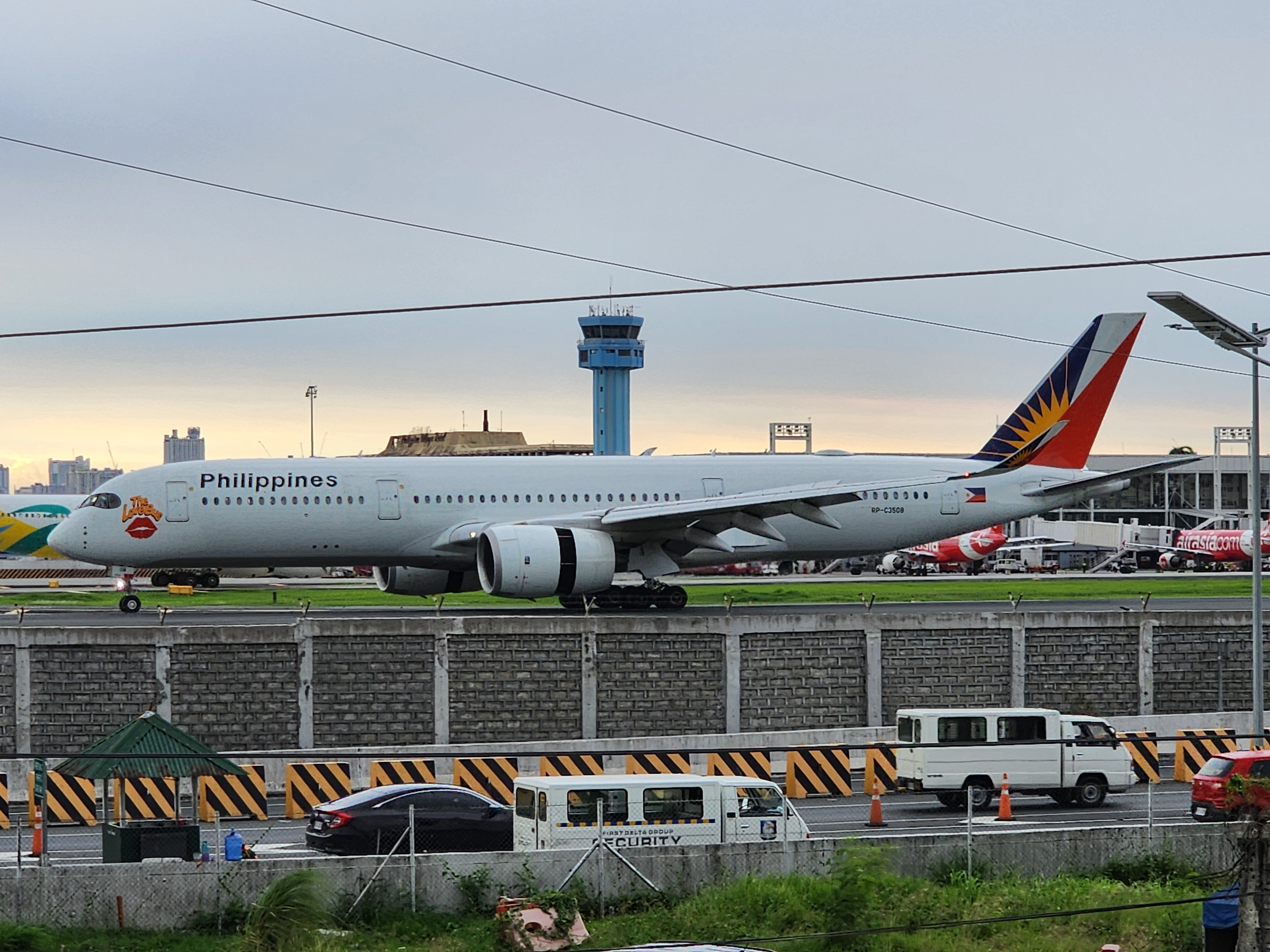
Philippine Airlines received its first Airbus A350-900 in 2018.

Continuing with its fleet expansion, Philippine Airlines acquired new aircraft to serve its new routes. In 2017, it received its first Bombardier Q400 for use on inter-island regional flights, as well as its ninth and tenth Boeing 777-300ER for use on long-haul flights. On June 1, 2018, PAL received its first Airbus A321neo, capable of operating non-stop regional flights for up to eight hours. The airline also acquired six new Airbus A350-900 with options for six more; the first A350 was delivered on July 14, 2018. It also intended to acquire the larger A350-1000, which was finalized in 2023, and later delivered on December 20, 2025. PAL subsequently retired its last Airbus A340 aircraft, with the airline being the last to use the aircraft in Asia, and some of its Airbus A320ceo, with some transferred to its subsidiary, PAL Express.

With improvements to its existing fleet, facilities, and services, along with its continued fleet modernization and expansion, the airline was certified with a four-star rating from Skytrax, joining 40 other airlines, after an audit made in December 2017. PAL was also awarded a 4-star certification by APEX on September 26, 2018, and was considered the Most Improved Airline of 2019 by AirlineRatings.com.

The airline signed agreements with companies such as Amadeus to upgrade its core technology system, and Lufthansa Technik Philippines to maintain its aircraft for 12 years. PAL also signed an agreement with the Armed Forces of the Philippines (AFP) on September 28, 2018, to give travel privileges to all AFP military personnel in the form of discounted domestic economy or business class tickets.

On January 29, 2019, All Nippon Airways purchased a 9.5% stake on the airline's holding company, PAL Holdings, for US$95 million.

On February 20, 2019, Philippine Airlines took delivery of its fifth Airbus A350, with the iconic "Love Bus" symbol, commemorating its forty years of partnership with aircraft manufacturer, Airbus.

On June 18, 2019, Philippine Airlines announced the appointment of Lucio Tan's daughter, Vivienne, as the new executive vice president and officer-in-charge following the retirement of president and COO Jaime Bautista. On July 29, PAL appointed Gilbert Santa Maria as the new president and COO, succeeding Bautista.

== COVID-19 pandemic and bankruptcy (2020–2022) ==
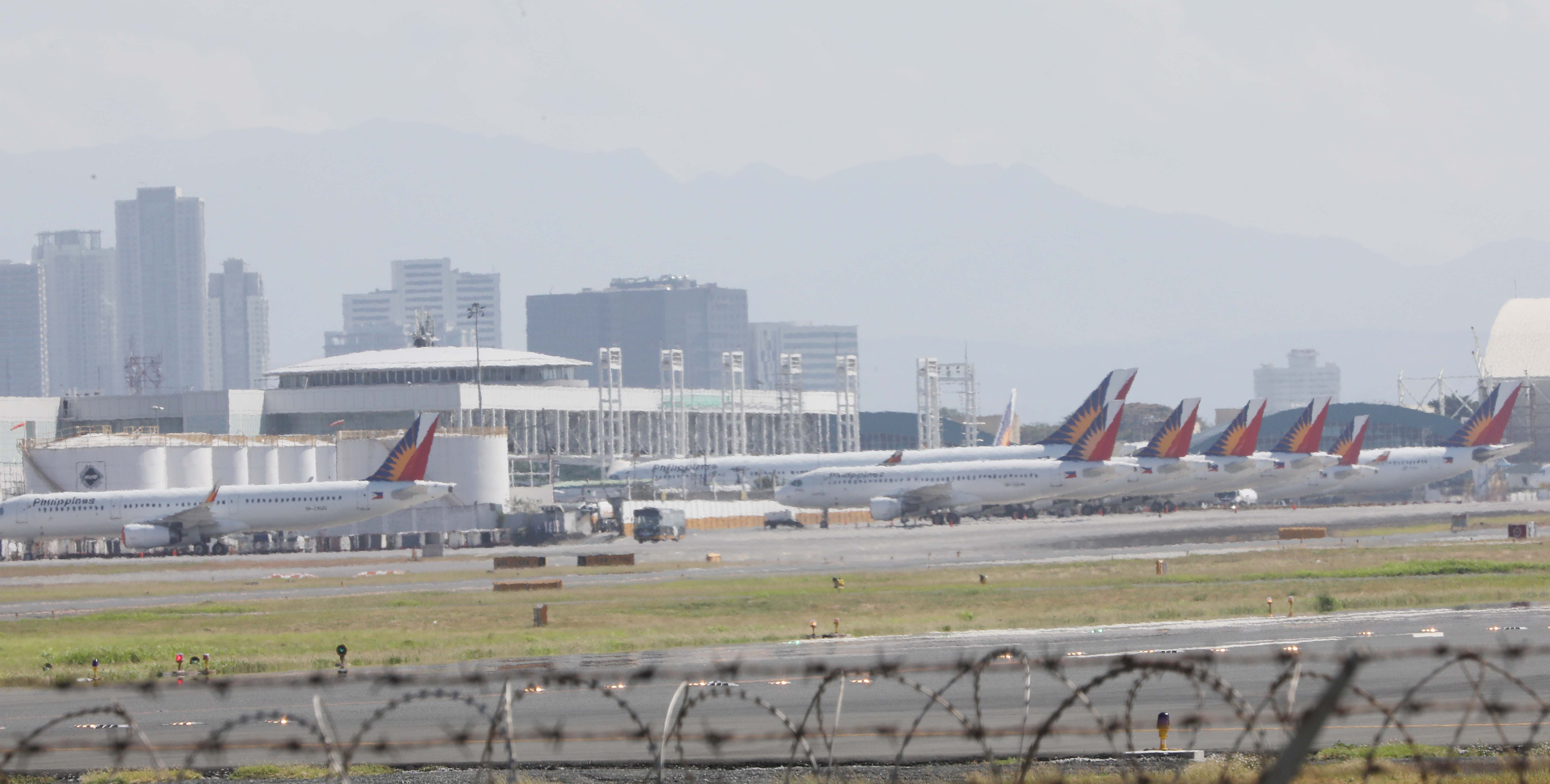
Aircraft of Philippine Airlines parked at Ninoy Aquino International Airport Terminal 2 during the enhanced community quarantine in Luzon.

Amid the COVID-19 pandemic, Philippine Airlines laid off 300 of its workers on February 28, 2020, due to financial losses in 2019. On March 17, it suspended its domestic flights, followed by its international flights on March 26 due to the enhanced community quarantine in Luzon. Limited operations resumed on June 1, but were again suspended in August. By the end of the year, it reported a net loss of ₱73 billion (US$1.47 billion).

On March 15, 2021, Philippine Airlines celebrated its eightieth anniversary.

Amid mounting debts of up to ₱98.6 billion (US$2 billion), PAL filed for Chapter 11 bankruptcy protection at a New York court on September 4, 2021. It cancelled more than 80,000 flights, laid off 2,300 employees, returned 22 aircraft to its lessors, and postponed deliveries of 13 aircraft on order. As part of the restructuring process, All Nippon Airways' stake on PAL was reduced from 9.75 to 4.75 percent, further reduced to less than one percent by May 2023. PAL managed to complete its financial restructuring in three months, unlike other airlines which remained in the same process since 2020. By the end of 2021, it returned to profitability, reporting a ₱56.49 billion profit by the end of the fiscal year, its first profit since 2016.

== Post-pandemic recovery (2022–present) ==
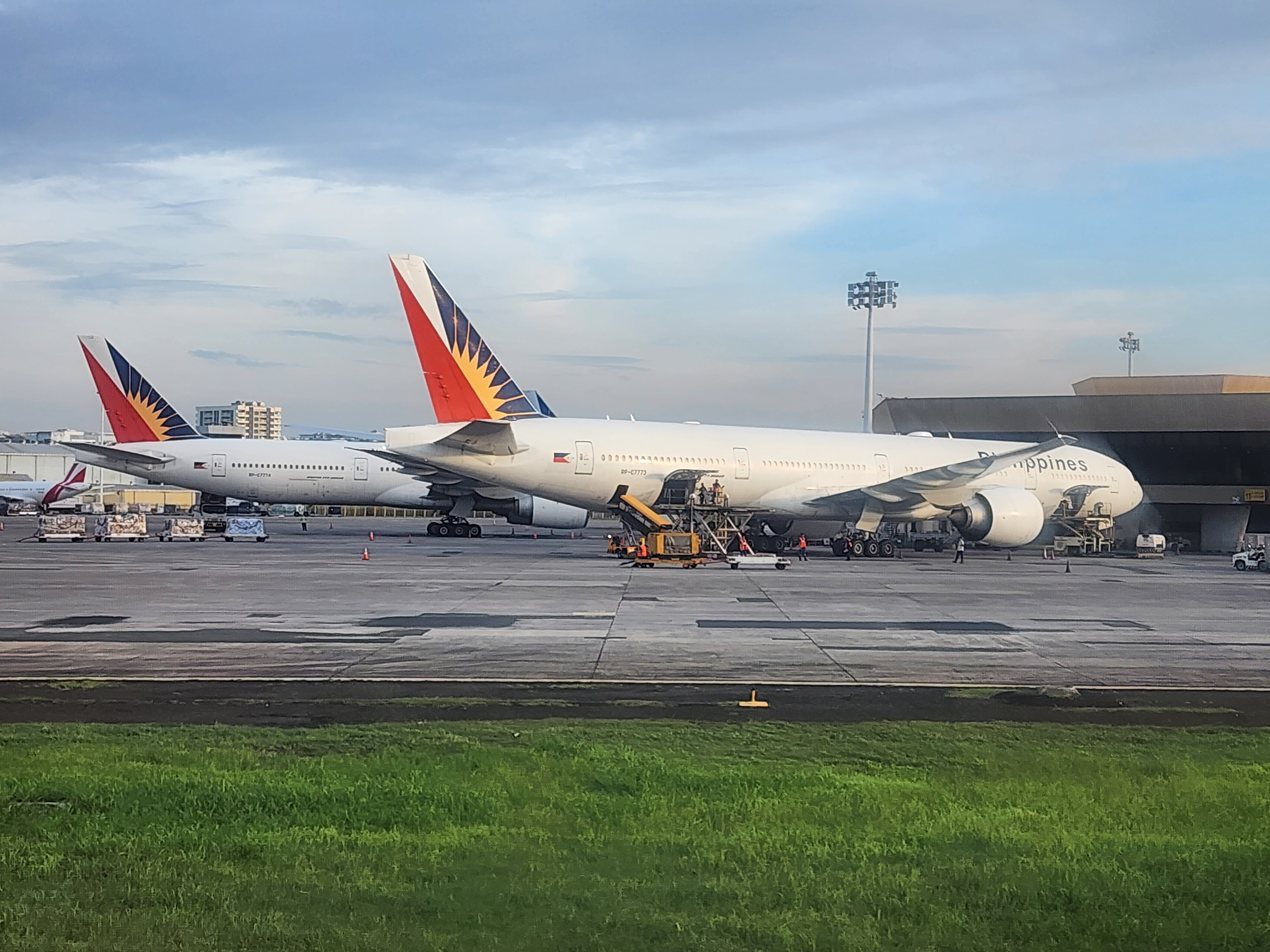
Two Boeing 777-300ERs of Philippine Airlines at Ninoy Aquino International Airport Terminal 1 in 2024.

On January 31, 2022, Philippine Airlines appointed Captain Stanley K. Ng as the new president and COO, replacing Gilbert Santa Maria. Ng, who is Lucio Tan's son-in-law, is the first pilot to assume the presidency of the airline since the 1960s. That same year, the airline reported a ₱139 billion (US$2.57 billion) profit for 2022 as travel restrictions ease.

On December 16, 2022, PAL returned to Baguio, the airline's very first destination, by launching flights from Cebu. From 2023 to 2024, PAL resumed flights to China, Perth, Tuguegarao, and started flying to Seattle. However, Cebu–Baguio flights ended in June 2024, and likewise shelved Sapporo from its network until 2025. In October, PAL suspended flights to Macau, Beijing, and Guangzhou amid weak demand to Chinese destinations; it later resumed flights to Beijing in March 2025.

PAL signed an agreement with aviation software provider Ramco Systems to automate and digitize the airline's business operations. It then continued with its fleet expansion, ordering nine A350-1000s with options for three more in June. However, although deliveries for its A350s were slightly delayed, PAL further delayed deliveries of its remaining thirteen A321neos beyond 2026. It opted to instead retrofit its existing A321-200s with on-demand in-flight entertainment similar to its A321neos. It then partnered with Airways Aviation of Australia and reopened its aviation school after a five-year closure.

In October 2024, PAL was ranked 62nd out of ninety of the world's best airlines by The Daily Telegraph. PAL outperformed some of the world's leading low-cost carriers like AirAsia and IndiGo, as well as fellow flag carriers Egyptair and SriLankan Airlines.

With the removal of foreign equity restrictions on Philippine companies in 2022, PAL appointed its first foreign president, British businessman Richard Nuttall, on April 23, 2025. Nuttall, who has held top positions at SriLankan Airlines, Bahrain Air, Royal Jordanian Airlines, and Cathay Pacific, replaced Captain Ng. He assume his new role on May 29. This follows a similar management change in rival Cebu Pacific, who appointed a foreigner in 2022 to lead the low-cost carrier.

In a disclosure to the Philippine Stock Exchange on May 19, 2025, Oasis Management, through Oasis Investments II Master Fund Ltd., acquired a 5.76-percent stake on PAL Holdings, becoming the airline's second-largest shareholder, ahead of All Nippon Airways (4.11 percent).

On June 6, 2026, PAL announced during the 82nd IATA Annual General Meeting in Rio de Janeiro, Brazil, that it will join the Oneworld alliance in 2027, making it the 16th member of the alliance.

PAL launched three-weekly nonstop flights to Chicago–O'Hare on November 9, 2026, after more than 38 years since the airline flew this route last in 1988, increasing PAL's U.S. destinations to eight.
