= Davao River Bridge =

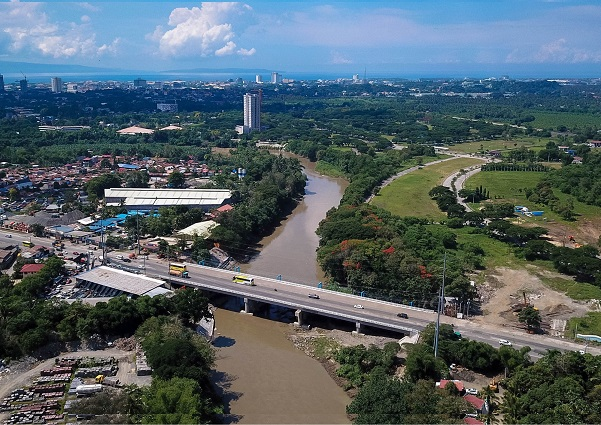
- Newly renovated Davao River Bridge
- Coordinates: 7°6′20.3″N 125°35′37.1″E
- Carries: 6 lanes of N1 (Davao City Diversion Road); pedestrian sidewalks
- Crosses: Davao River
- Locale: Davao City
- Official name: Davao River Bridge
- Other name: Ma-a Bridge
- Maintained by: Department of Public Works and Highways

Characteristics
- Total length: 227.38 m (746 ft)
- No. of lanes: 6 (3 lanes per direction)

Statistics
- Toll: No

Location
- Interactive map of Davao River Bridge

The Davao River Bridge, also known as the Ma-a Bridge is a six-lane road bridge in Davao City.

== Background ==
The Davao River Bridge is a road bridge which has six lanes. It connects the barangays of Ma-a and Buhangin of Davao City. It is part of the Davao City Diversion Road. The bridge has a span of 140 meters (460 ft) and approaches measuring 87.384 meters (286.69 ft).

SInce the 2010s renovation, the bridge has the daily capacity to 31,576 motorists.

== History ==
=== 2015-2018 renovations ===
A bridge widening project for the Davao River Bridge in 2015 to widen the bridge from having two lanes to six lanes. In the first year of the widening project, right-of-way and technical issues were encountered forcing the implementation of widening plans to be moved to the upstream portion of the bridge. The widening at the upstream portion of the bridge completed in 2017 was conducted by Vicente T. Lao Construction.

For the second phase of the bridge widening project, a joint venture by Roma Construction and Development Corporation and Bislig Venture and Development Inc. conducted the widening of the bridge in its downstream portion from 2017 to 2018. The whole project was completed on April 18, 2018 and the bridge was inaugurated by Philippine President Rodrigo Duterte on May 24, 2018.

The abutments were also reinforced, reflectorized thermoplastic pavement markings were installed, sidewalks were added, and craneway steel component and asphalt overlay were included in the ₱345 million renovation works.
