= Conroy =

Conroy is an Irish surname.

== Overview ==
Conroy is an Irish surname of multiple origins. In some cases it is the form used by descendants of the Ó Maolchonaire bardic family of what is now East Galway and South Roscommon. In west County Galway, most bearers of the name are probably descended from the Mac Conraoi family of Delbhna Tír Dhá Locha. This latter Irish family name was often anglicised into King due to the phonological similarity with the word rí. The Ó Cingeadh/Ó Cionga bardic family from east of Loch Ree also had their name corrupted into King, but for English phonological reasons.

== People with the surname ==
- Al Conroy (born 1966), Canadian ice hockey player
- Alfred Conroy (1864–1920), Australian politician and barrister
- Andrew Meintjes Conroy (1877–1951), South African politician
- Annemarie Conroy, American attorney and former politician
- Anthony Conroy (1895–1978), American ice hockey player
- Bill Conroy (infielder) (1899–1970), American baseball player
- Bill Conroy (catcher) (1915–1997), American baseball player
- Caroline Conroy (born 1977), Lord Mayor of Dublin
- Craig Conroy (born 1971), American ice hockey player
- Crispin Conroy (born 1963), Australian diplomat
- David Conroy (born 1937), British television producer
- Deb Conroy, American politician
- Don Conroy, Irish author
- Donald Conroy (1921–1998), American Marine Corps colonel
- Ed Conroy (born 1967), American basketball player and coach
- Ed Conroy (politician) (1946–2020), Canadian politician
- Edward T. Conroy (1929–1982, American politician
- Frances Conroy (born 1953), American actress
- Frank Conroy (1936–2005), American author
- Frank Conroy (actor) (1890–1964), British-American film and stage actor
- Harry Conroy (1943–2010), Scottish trade union leader and journalist
- Jack Conroy (1898–1990), leftist American writer
- James Conroy (born 1943), Irish archer
- James Conroy-Ward (born 1947), British actor and singer
- Jarlath Conroy (born 1944), Irish actor
- Joe Conroy (born 1934), Michigan State Senator
- Jim Conroy (born 1970), American actor and television writer
- Sir John Conroy (1786–1854), British army officer, a significant figure in Queen Victoria's childhood
- Katrine Conroy (born 1957), Canadian politician
- Kevin Conroy (1955–2022), American actor
- Kevin C. Conroy (born 1960), American businessman
- Lesley Conroy (born 1973 or 1974), Irish actress and filmmaker
- M. Joseph Conroy (1874–1958), mayor of Anchorage, Alaska 1923–1924
- Mark Conroy, Australian actor
- Martin Conroy (1922–2006), American advertising executive
- Mickey Conroy (1927–2005), American politician
- Mike Conroy (writer), co-creator of the Eagle Awards
- Mike Conroy (born 1957), Scottish footballer
- Mike Conroy (footballer born 1965) (born 1965), Scottish footballer
- Millington Conroy (born 1952), collector of Marilyn Monroe artifacts
- Pat Conroy (1945–2016), Irish-American author
- Pat Conroy (politician) (born 1979), Australian politician
- Patricia Conroy (born 1964), Canadian country music singer/songwriter
- Paul Conroy (born 1949), British music executive
- Paul Conroy (1964–2026), British journalist and photographer
- Paul Conroy (born 1989), Irish footballer
- Robert Conroy (1938–2014), American novelist
- Rúaidhrí Conroy (born 1979), Irish actor
- Ryan Conroy (born 1987), Scottish footballer
- Stephen Conroy (born 1964), Scottish artist
- Stephen Conroy (born 1963), Australian Senator
- Steve Conroy (born 1966), Scottish football referee
- Terry Conroy (born 1946), Irish footballer
- Tim Conroy (born 1960), American baseball player
- Tom Conroy (born 1962), American politician, member of the Massachusetts House of Representatives
- Will Conroy (born 1982), American basketball player
- Tommy Conroy (Dublin footballer), (born 1963), Irish footballer
- Tommy Conroy (born 2000), Irish footballer
- William Jackson Conroy (1849–1915), Canadian politician, farmer and miller
- William Conroy (1857–1877), Irish murderer
- William "Wid" Conroy (1977–1959), American baseball player

Conroy as a given name may refer to:

- Conroy Maddox (1912–2005), English surrealist painter, collagist, writer and lecturer
- Francis Conroy Sullivan (1882–1929), Canadian architect
- John Conroy Hutcheson (1840–1897), British author

=== Fictional characters ===
- Diavolo Conroy, a character from the Eoin Colfer novels Iron Man: The Gauntlet (2016) and The Fowl Twins (2019)
- Jack Conroy, a character from the period adventure drama film White Fang (1991), portrayed by Ethan Hawke

== See also ==
- Conroy, Iowa, a small community in the central United States
- Conroy Aircraft, a former American aircraft manufacturer
- Conry, a disambiguation page for people and places named Conry
