= List of Douglas DC-3 family variants =

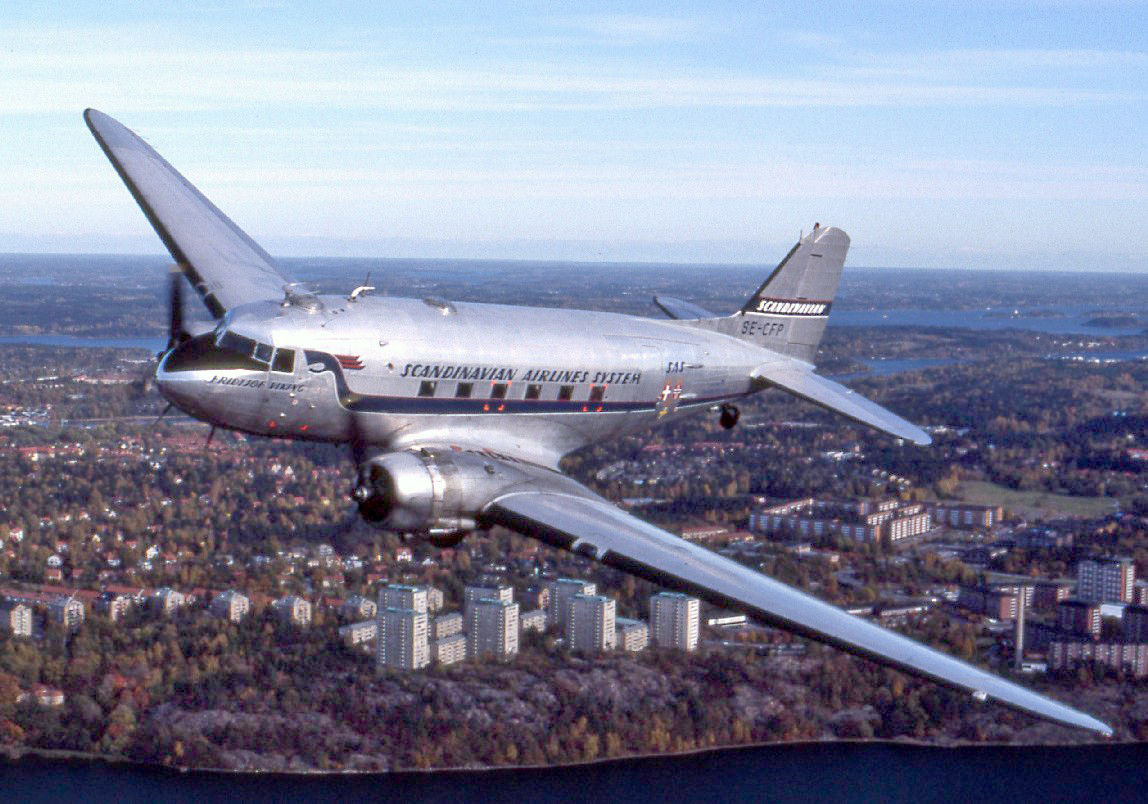
- A DC-3 operated by Flygande Veteraner in Sweden

This is a list of variants of the Douglas DC-3 family of airliner and transport aircraft.

== Production totals ==
Data from:

- Civil DC-3 variants - 607
- Military C-47 derivatives - 10,047
- Licence production in the USSR - 4,937
- Licence production in Japan - 487

== Civil production ==
Douglas Commercial-3

DC-1
DC-2	C-32
C-33
C-34
C-39
C-42
DST; DC-3
C-41; C-41A
DC-3A
C-47; C-47A; C-47B; C-47C
DC-3B
C-48; C-48A
DC-3C
C-49; C-49A; C-48B; C-49C; C-49D; C-49E; C-49F; C-49G; C-49H; C-49J; C-49K
C-50; C-50A; C-50B; C-50C; C-50D
C-51
C-52; C-52A; C-52B; C-52C
C-53; XC-53A; C-53B; C-53C; C-53D
C-68
DC-3D	C-117A

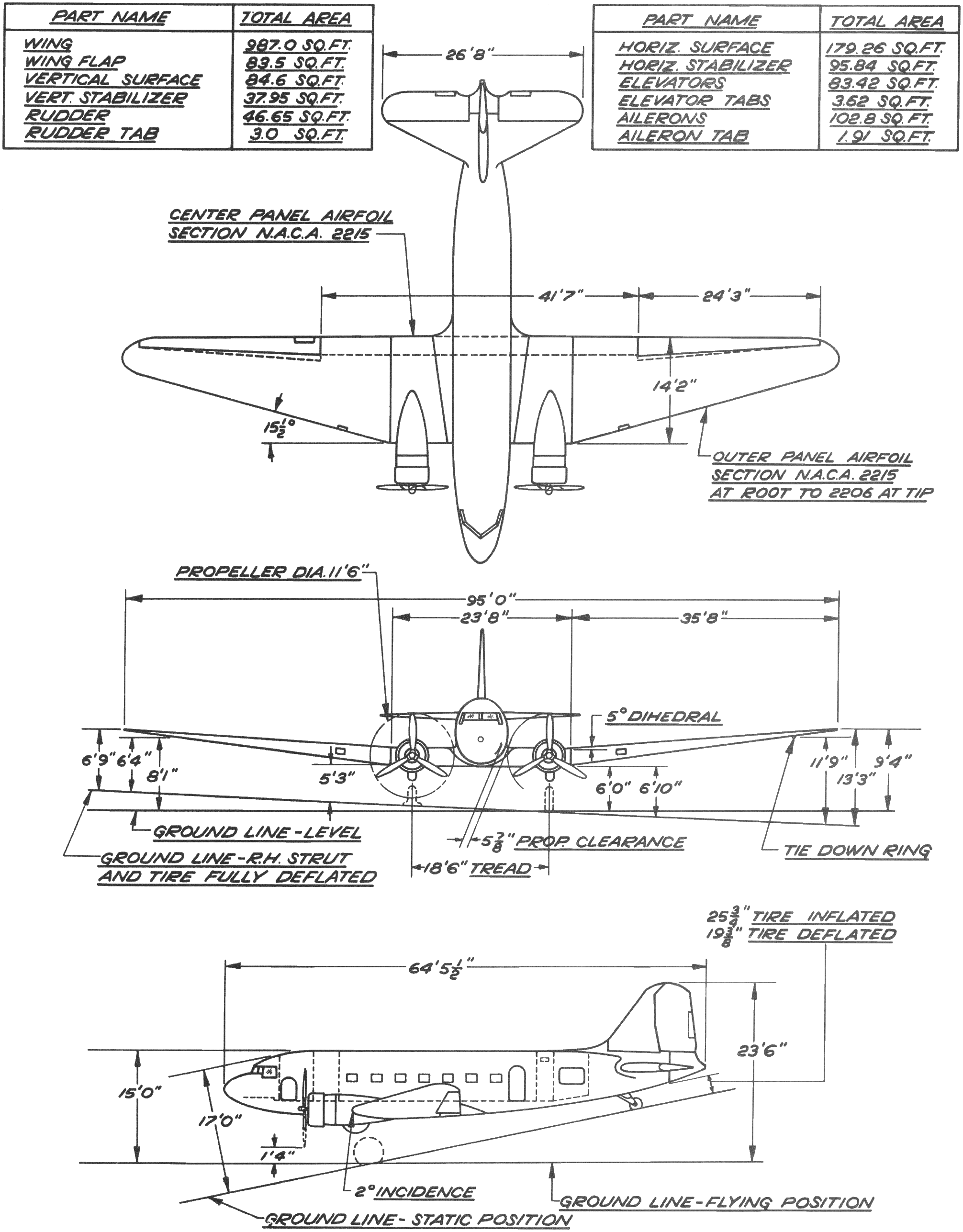
A 3-view line drawing of a C-49J

DST
Douglas Sleeper Transport, the initial variant with two 1,000–1,200 hp (750–890 kW) Wright R-1820 Cyclone engines and standard sleeper accommodation for up to 16 with small upper windows, convertible to carry up to 24 day passengers.

DST-A
DST with 1,000–1,200 hp (750–890 kW) Pratt & Whitney R-1830 Twin Wasp radial piston engines

DC-3
Main prewar production variant fitted with 21 passenger seats, two 1,000–1,200 hp (750–890 kW) Wright R-1820 Cyclone engines

DC-3A
Improved DC-3 with two 1,000–1,200 hp (750–890 kW) Pratt & Whitney R-1830 Twin Wasp radial piston engines.

DC-3B
Improved DC-3 with two 1,100 hp (820 kW) Wright R-1820-G101 Cyclone or two 1,200 hp (890 kW) Wright R-1820-G202A Cyclone engines.

DC-3C
Designation for ex-military C-47, C-53, and R4D aircraft rebuilt by Douglas Aircraft in 1946 and sold on the civil market.

DC-3D
Designation for 28 additional new aircraft built by Douglas in 1946 for civil airline operation using components from uncompleted USAAF C-117s.

DC-3S
Super DC-3, improved DC-3 with a new wing and tail, and powered by two 1,450 hp (1,080 kW) Pratt & Whitney R-2000-D7 or 1,475 hp (1,100 kW) Wright R-1820-C9HE Cyclone engines. The five examples were converted by Douglas between 1949 and 1950 from existing DC-3 and R4D airframes.

PS-84
Production of a 14-28 seat passenger airliner version in the USSR powered by two 900 hp (670 kW) Shvetsov M-62 / 1,000 hp (750 kW) Shvetsov ASh-62 engines. With a somewhat smaller span and higher empty weight, it was also equipped with lower-powered engines compared to the DC-3 and the cargo door was transposed to the right side of the fuselage.

=== Military designations for impressed civil aircraft ===
C-41A
A single DC-3A (40-070) modified as a VIP transport, powered by two 1,200 hp (895 kW) Pratt & Whitney R-1830-21 radial piston engines, used to fly the Secretary of War.

C-48
One former United Air Lines DC-3A impressed.

C-48A
Three impressed DC-3As with 18-seat interiors.

C-48B
Sixteen impressed former United Air Lines DST-As with 16-berth interior used as air ambulances.

C-48C
Sixteen impressed DC-3As with 21-seat interiors.

C-49
Various DC-3 and DST models, 138 impressed into service as C-49, C-49A, C-49B, C-49C, C-49D, C-49E, C-49F, C-49G, C-49H, C-49J, and C-49K.

C-50
Various DC-3 models, 14 impressed as C-50, C-50A, C-50B, C-50C, and C-50D.

C-51
One aircraft ordered by Canadian Colonial Airlines impressed into service, had starboard-side door.

C-52
DC-3A aircraft with R-1830 engines, five impressed as C-52, C-52A, C-52B, C-52C, and C-52D.

C-68
Two DC-3As impressed with 21-seat interiors.

C-84
1 impressed DC-3B aircraft.

R4D-2
Two Eastern Air Lines DC-3s impressed into USN service as VIP transports, later designated R4D-2F and later R4D-2Z.

R4D-4
Ten impressed DC-3s

R4D-4R
Seven impressed DC-3s as staff transports.

R4D-4Q
Radar countermeasures version of R4D-4.

Dakota II
RAF designation for impressed DC-3s

== Military production ==
C-47 Skytrain
Initial military version of the DC-3A with seats for 27 troops, 965 built including 12 to the United States Navy as R4D-1.

C-47A

C-47 with a 24-volt electrical system, 5,254 built including USN aircraft designated R4D-5.

RC-47A

C-47A equipped for photographic reconnaissance and ELINT missions.

SC-47A

C-47A equipped for Search Air Rescue; re-designated HC-47A in 1962.

VC-47A

C-47A equipped for VIP transport role.

C-47B

Powered by R-1830-90 engines with high-altitude two-speed superchargers and extra fuel capacity to cover the China-Burma-India routes, 3,364 built.

VC-47B

C-47B equipped for VIP transport role.

XC-47C

C-47 tested with Edo Model 78 floats for possible use as a seaplane.

C-47D

C-47B with high-altitude two-speed superchargers replaced by one-speed superchargers after the war.

AC-47D

Gunship aircraft with three side-firing .30 in (7.62 mm) Minigun machine guns.

EC-47D

C-47D with equipment for the Airborne Early Warning role; prior to 1962 was designated AC-47D.

NC-47D

C-47D modified for test roles.

RC-47D

C-47D equipped for photographic reconnaissance and ELINT missions.

SC-47D

C-47D equipped for Search Air Rescue; re-designated HC-47D in 1962.

VC-47D

C-47D equipped for VIP transport role.

C-47E

Modified cargo variant with space for 27–28 passengers or 18–24 litters.

C-47F

YC-129 re-designated, Super DC-3 prototype for evaluation by USAF later passed to USN as XR4D-8.

C-47L/M

C-47H/Js equipped for the support of American Legation United States Naval Attache (ALUSNA) and Military Assistance Advisory Group (MAAG) missions.

EC-47N/P/Q

C-47A and D aircraft modified for ELINT/ARDF mission. N and P differ in radio bands covered, while Q replaces analog equipment found on the N and P with a digital suite, redesigned antenna equipment, and uprated engines.

C-47R

One C-47M modified for high altitude work, specifically for missions in Ecuador.

C-53 Skytrooper
Troop transport version of the C-47.

XC-53A Skytrooper

One aircraft with full-span slotted flaps and hot-air leading edge de-icing.

C-53B Skytrooper

Winterised version of C-53 with extra fuel capacity and separate navigator's station, eight built.

C-53C Skytrooper

C-53 with larger port-side door, 17 built.

C-53D Skytrooper

C-53C with 24V DC electrical system, 159 built.

C-117A Skytrooper
C-47B with 24-seat airline-type interior for staff transport use, 16 built.

VC-117A

Three re-designated C-117s used in the VIP role.

SC-117A

One C-117C converted for air-sea rescue.

C-117B/VC-117B

High-altitude two-speed superchargers replaced by one-speed superchargers, one built and conversions from C-117As all later VC-117B.

C-117D

USN/USMC R4D-8 re-designated.

LC-117D

USN/USMC R4D-8L re-designated.

TC-117D

USN/USMC R4D-8T re-designated.

VC-117D

USN R4D-8Z re-designated.

YC-129
Super DC-3 prototype for evaluation by USAF re-designated C-47F and later passed to USN as XR4D-8.

CC-129
Canadian Forces designation for the C-47 (post-1970).

XCG-17
One C-47 tested as a 40-seat troop glider with engines removed and faired over.

R4D
Production aircraft, impressed civil aircraft, and aircraft transferred from the USAAF / USAF

R4D-1 Skytrain

USN/USMC version of the C-47.

R4D-3

Twenty C-53Cs transferred to USN.

R4D-5

C-47A variant 24-volt electrical system replacing the 12-volt of the C-47; re-designated C-47H in 1962, 238 transferred from USAF.

R4D-5L

R4D-5 for use in Antarctica. re-designated LC-47H in 1962.

R4D-5Q

R4D-5 for use as special ECM trainer. re-designated EC-47H in 1962.

R4D-5R

R4D-5 for use as a personnel transport for 21 passengers and as a trainer aircraft; re-designated TC-47H in 1962.

R4D-5S

R4D-5 for use as a special ASW trainer; re-designated SC-47H in 1962.

R4D-5Z

R4D-5 for use as a VIP transport; re-designated VC-47H in 1962.

R4D-6

157 C-47Bs transferred to USN; re-designated C-47J in 1962.

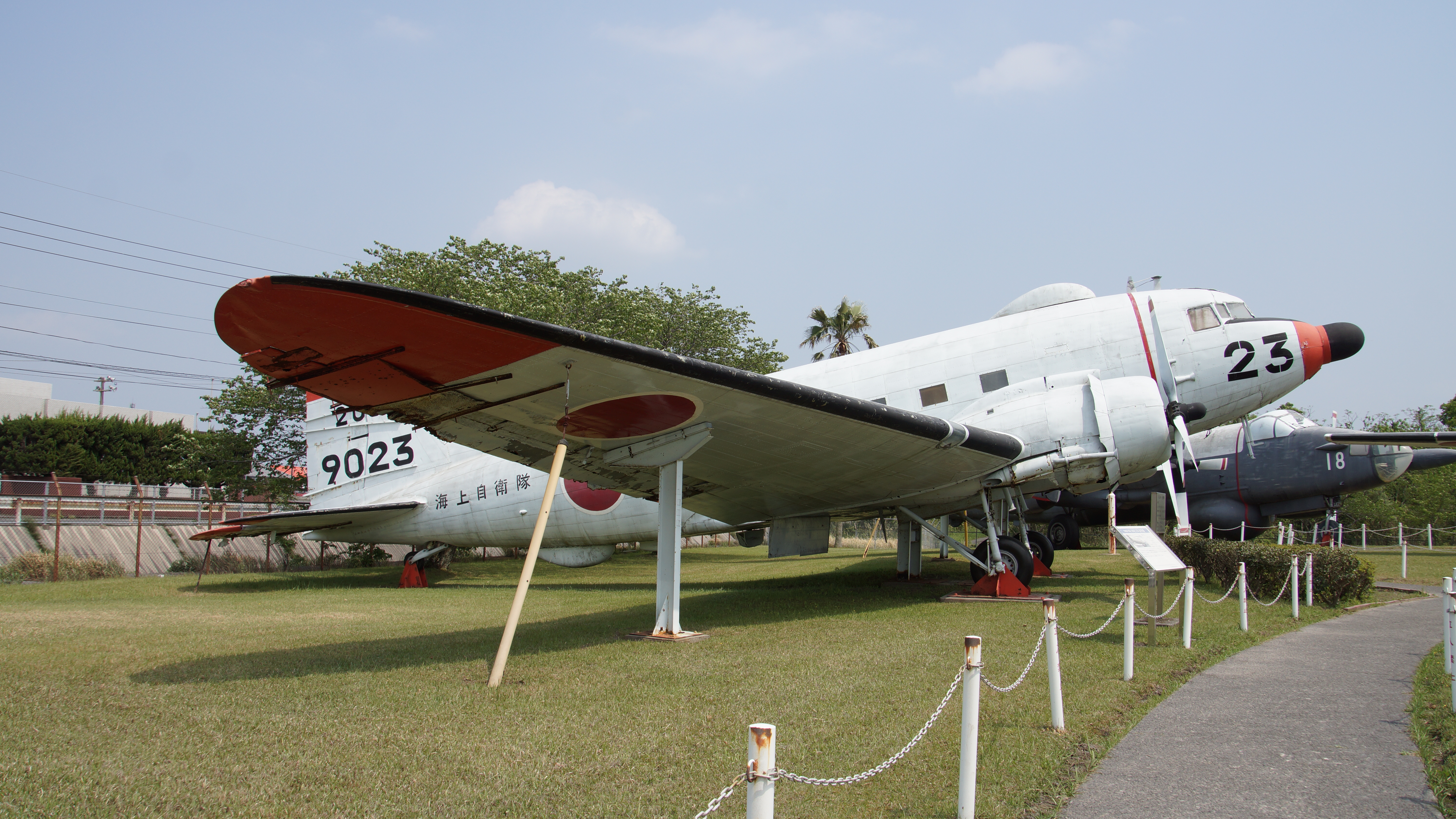
JMSDF R4D-6Q.

R4D-6L, Q, R, S, and Z

Variants as the R4D-5 series; re-designated LC-47J, EC-47J, TC-47J, SC-47J, and VC-47J respectively in 1962.

R4D-7

44 TC-47Bs transferred from USAF for use as a navigational trainer; re-designated TC-47K in 1962.

R4D-8

R4D-5 and R4D-6 aircraft fitted with modified wings and re-designed tail surfaces; re-designated C-117D in 1962.

R4D-8L

R4D-8 converted for Antarctic use, re-designated LC-117D in 1962.

R4D-8T

R4D-8 converted as crew trainers, re-designated TC-117D in 1962.

R4D-8Z

R4D-8 converted as a staff transport, re-designated VC-117D in 1962.

Dakota I
RAF designation for the C-47 and R4D-1

Dakota III
RAF designation for the C-47A.

Dakota IV
RAF designation for the C-47B.

Li-2
4,937 DC-3 derived military transport aircraft with defensive armament license-built in the USSR (designation started from 17 September 1942).

Li-2D

Paratroop transport version (1942), with reinforced floor and tie-downs, plus cargo doors (slightly smaller than the C-47 doors) on the left.

Li-2P

Basic civil passenger model.

Li-2PG

Civil "combi" passenger-cargo version.

Li-2R

"Reconnaissance" version, with bulged windows fitted behind the cockpit.

Li-2VV

Bomber version (1942).

Li-2V

High-altitude weather surveillance version of the Li-2, equipped with turbocharged engines.

Li-3

Yugoslavian version equipped with American Pratt & Whitney R-1830 engines (similar to the DC-3).

Li-2T

Polish bomber training aircraft.

L2D
487 License built DC-3s for the IJNAS.

LXD1

A single DC-3 supplied for evaluation by the Imperial Japanese Navy Air Service.

L2D2

Personnel transports with Mitsubishi Kinsei 43 radials.

L2D2-1

Cargo version with enlarged cargo door.

L2D3 and L2D3-1

Versions with two Mitsubishi Kinsei 51 engines, each at 1,325 hp (975 kW).

L2D3a and L2D3-1a

Production series with two Mitsubishi Kinsei 53 engines, each at 1,325 hp (975 kW).

L2D4 and L2D4-1

Armed versions with a 13 mm machine gun in a dorsal turret and two 7.7 mm machine guns in the left and right fuselage hatches.

L2D5

Wooden version, replacement of steel components with wood; used two Mitsubishi Kinsei 62 engines, each 1,590 hp (1,170 kW).

== Conversions ==
From the early 1950s, some DC-3s were modified to use Rolls-Royce Dart engines, as in the Conroy Turbo Three. Other conversions featured Armstrong Siddeley Mamba or Pratt & Whitney Canada PT6A turbines. Recently a Canadian company has also offered a conversion to PZL Asz-62IT power.

Dart Dakota
Two C-47Bs converted to use the Rolls-Royce Dart turboprop (1,547 ehp) for development of operating procedures by airlines before introduction of BEA's Vickers Viscounts. Acquired from Field Aircraft Services Ltd in 1950 the installations were paid for by the Ministry of Supply. They were flown as G-ALXM Sir Henry Royce and G-AMDB Claude Johnson forming the "Dart Development Unit" on adhoc and scheduled freight flights.
A single C-47, G-AMDB (cn 14987/26432) was converted and reverted to piston power after trials and route-proving, serving BEA as a standard "Pionair" until it was sold in 1962.
A single C-47B-1-DK (c/n 25613 / s/n 43-48352 / KJ829), was also converted for use by Rolls-Royce in trials of the 1,540 hp (1,148.38 kW) Rolls-Royce Dart, the aircraft, given the test registration G-37-2 flew with Darts. Sold to Tyne Tees Airways in April 1963 the airframe was scrapped in 1965.

Mamba Dakota
A single C-47 (KJ839) was converted with 1,475 hp (1,099.91 kW) Armstrong Siddeley Mamba turboprop engines, for trials.

DC-3/2000
DC-3 engine conversion done by Airtech Canada, first offered in 1987. Powered by two PZL ASz-62IT radials.

Basler BT-67
DC-3 conversion with a stretched fuselage, strengthened structure, modern avionics, and powered by two Pratt & Whitney Canada PT-6A-67R turboprops.

Conroy Turbo Three
One DC-3 converted by Conroy Aircraft with two Rolls-Royce Dart Mk. 510 turboprop engines.

Conroy Super-Turbo-Three
Same as the Turbo Three but converted from a Super DC-3. One converted.

Conroy Tri-Turbo-Three
Two DC-3s converted by Conroy Aircraft with three Pratt & Whitney Canada PT-6A turboprops. The second aircraft replaced the first which had been severely damaged in a fire.

USAC DC-3 Turbo Express
A turboprop conversion by the United States Aircraft Corporation, fitting Pratt & Whitney Canada PT6A-45R turboprop engines with an extended forward fuselage to maintain center of gravity. First flight of the prototype conversion, (N300TX), was on July 29, 1982.

BSAS C-47-65ARTP Turbo Dakota
Refit with two Pratt & Whitney Canada PT6A-67R engines and fuselage stretch for the South African Air Force.

BSAS C-47-67FTP Turbo Dakota
Refit with two Pratt & Whitney Canada PT6A-67F engines and fuselage stretch for the South African Air Force.

Schafer/AMI -65TP Cargomaster

Dodson International Turbo Dakota DC-3 PT6A-65AR

== See also ==
- List of accidents and incidents involving the DC-3
- List of Douglas DC-3 operators
