= List of people legally executed in Western Australia =

This is a list of people executed in Western Australia. It lists people who were executed by the Dutch East India Company (VOC), the British and, from 1901, Australian authorities within the modern-day boundaries of Western Australia. For people executed in other parts of Australia, see the sidebar.

Uniquely among Australian states, Western Australia is the site of several executions carried out by Europeans besides the British, namely the VOC. On 2 October 1629, seven crew members of the VOC ship Batavia were hanged on Long Island in the Houtman Abrolhos for mutiny and the subsequent massacre of 125 passengers and crew.

== Long Island, Houtman Abrolhos ==
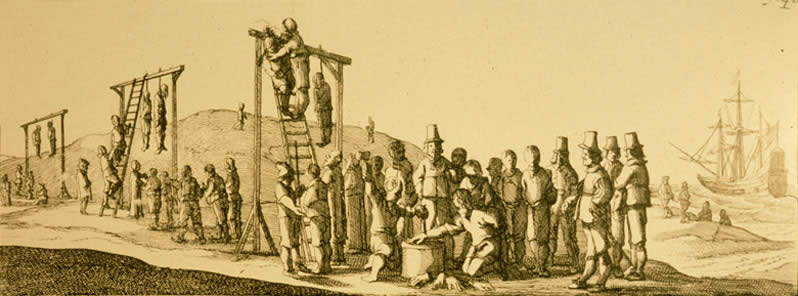
The hangings of the Batavia mutineers in 1629, the first Europeans to be executed in Australia

- Jeronimus Corneliszoon - 2 October 1629 - Hanged as party to the murder of 125 men, women and children
- Lenert Michielsz - 2 October 1629 - Hanged as party to the murder of 125 men, women and children
- Mattys Beijr - 2 October 1629 - Hanged as party to the murder of 125 men, women and children
- Jan Hendricx - 2 October 1629 - Hanged as party to the murder of 125 men, women and children
- Allert Janssen - 2 October 1629 - Hanged as party to the murder of 125 men, women and children
- Rutger Fredericxsz - 2 October 1629 - Hanged as party to the murder of 125 men, women and children
- Andries Jonas - 2 October 1629 - Hanged as party to the murder of 125 men, women and children

== Perth ==
- Mendik – 14 October 1841 – Hanged at the site of the crime for the murder of twelve-year-old John Burtenshaw on the Canning River at Maddington on 16 July 1839
- Buckas (a lascar) – January 1845 – Hanged at Perth for rape of a child under ten years of age
- Kanyin – 12 April 1850 – Hanged at Redcliffe for the murder of Yadupwert at York. This was the first public execution in Western Australia for inter se murder
- Edward Bishop - 12 October 1854 - Hanged at South Perth for the murder of Ah Chong, a chinaman, at York. Protested his innocence to the end. Three years later William Voss confessed to the crime. Voss was hanged in 1862 at Perth Gaol for the murder of his wife

=== Perth Gaol ===
People hanged (unless other means of execution is stated) at the Perth Gaol:

==== 1830s to 1850s ====
- Midgegooroo – 22 May 1833 – Executed at the Perth Gaol by firing squad on a death warrant issued summarily by Lieutenant Governor Frederick Irwin, for the murders of Thomas and John Velvick at Bull's Creek on 31 March 1833
- Bridget Hurford – 15 October 1855 – for the murder of her husband John Hurford at Vasse
- William Dodd – 15 October 1855 – for the murder of John Hurford at Vasse
- George Williams – 15 October 1855 – for wounding Warder James McEvoy with a shovel at the Convict Establishment on 26 September 1855
- John Scott – 14 January 1856 – for the murder of William Longmate at Vasse
- Daniel Lewis (Convict # 2972)- January 1857 - for the rape of Ellen Horton at Woorooloo
- John Lloyd – 29 October 1857 – for wounding with intent to kill John Brown at Port Gregory in June 1857
- Richard Bibby – 17 October 1859 – for the murder of Billamarra at Upper Irwin in March 1859. First European executed for murder of an Aboriginal person in Western Australia

==== 1860s ====
- Thomas Airey - 13 October 1860 - for the rape of five-year-old Lydia Farmer at Perth in July. Had been granted ticket-of-leave 4 June 1860.
- John Caldwell - 13 October 1860 - for rape and murder of an Aboriginal girl at Champion Bay. A ticket-of-leave man.
- Thomas Clancy – 10 January 1861 – for the rape of seven-year-old Ellen Jane White at Bunbury
- Joseph McDonald – 10 January 1861 – for rape at Toodyay
- Robert Thomas Palin – 6 July 1861 – for robbery with violence of Susan Harding at Fremantle
- William Voss – 9 January 1862 – for the murder of his wife Mary Moir at York on 11 November 1861
- Kewacan (Larry) – 24 January 1862 – for the murder of Charles Storey at Jacup on 23 July 1861
- Long Jimmy – 24 January 1862 – for the murder of Charles Storey at Jacup on 23 July 1861
- Narreen – 10 April 1862 – for the murder of an Aboriginal girl called Nelly at Victoria Plains
- Eenue – 10 April 1862 – for the murder of an Aboriginal girl called Nelly at Victoria Plains
- Finger – 10 April 1862 – for the murder of Charles Storey at Jacup on 23 July 1861
- Thomas Pedder – 21 March 1863 – for the murder of Thomas Sweeny, a shepherd, at Irwin River on 1 December 1862
- John Thomas – 8 September 1863 – for the murder of Duncan Urquhart at Peninsula Farm on 6 June 1863
- Joseph White – 21 October 1863 – for rape of Jane Rhodes aged 13, at Greenough on 18 August 1863
- Teelup – 21 October 1863 – for the murder of Charles Storey at Jacup on 23 July 1861
- Narrigalt – 18 July 1865 – for the murder of Martha Farling, a 3 1/2 year-old Aboriginal-Caucasian girl, near York on 26 May 1865
- Youndalt – 18 July 1865 – for the murder of Martha Farling, a 3 1/2 year-old Aboriginal-Caucasian girl, near York on 26 May 1865
- Nandingbert – 18 July 1865 – for the murder of Quatcull near Albany on 14 May 1865
- Yardalgene (also called Jackey Howson) – 18 July 1865 – for the murder of Quatcull near Albany on 14 May 1865
- Daniel Duffy - 11 January 1866 - an escaped convict, hanged for the murder of Edward Johnson on 5 November 1865 at Northam
- Matthew Brooks - 11 January 1866 - an escaped convict, hanged for the murder of Edward Johnson on 5 November 1865 at Northam
- Bernard Wootton (also called MacNulty) - 8 October 1867 - an escaped convict, hanged for the attempted murder of Police Sgt. John Moye after his recapture at Murramine, near Beverley. Hanged at Perth Gaol.

==== 1870s ====
- James Fannin – 14 April 1871 – for the rape of thirteen-year-old Mary Dawes on the Albany Road on 24 November 1870. The first private execution and the last execution for rape in Western Australia.
- Margaret Cody – 15 July 1871 – for the murder of James Holditch, at North Fremantle on 4 March 1871
- William Davis – 15 July 1871 – for the murder of James Holditch, at North Fremantle on 4 March 1871
- Briley (Briarly) – 13 October 1871 – for the murder of Charley (Wickin) at Albany
- Noorbung – 13 October 1871 – for the murder of Margaret Mary McGowan at Boyanup on 30 June 1871
- Charcoal (Mullandaridgee) – 15 February 1872 – for the murder of Samuel Wells Lazenby at Port Walcott on 7 August 1871
- Tommy (Mullandee) – 15 February 1872 – for the murder of Samuel Wells Lazenby at Port Walcott on 7 August 1871
- Yarradeee – 16 October 1873 – for the murder and cannibalism of three-year-old Edward William Dunn at Yanganooka, Port Gregory on 5 October 1865
- Muregelly – 16 October 1873 – for the murder and cannibalism of three-year-old Edward William Dunn at Yanganooka, Port Gregory on 5 October 1865
- Robert Goswell – 13 January 1874 – for murder of Mary Anne Lloyd at Stapelford, Beverley on 1 December 1873
- John Gill – 4 April 1874 – hanged for the murder of William Foster at Narrogin on 13 February 1874
- Bobbinett – 22 April 1875 – for the murder of Police Lance-Corporal William Archibald Armstrong near Kojonup on 14 January 1875
- Wanaba (or Wallaby) – 22 April 1875 – for the murder of Tommy Howell (or Moul), a police assistant, near Yalgoo on 10 July 1874
- Wandagary – 22 April 1875 – for the murder of Tommy Howell (or Moul), a police assistant, near Yalgoo on 10 July 1874
- Kenneth Brown – 10 June 1876 – for the murder of his wife Mary Ann on 3 January 1876 at Geraldton
- Yarndu – 16 October 1876
- Chilagorah – 29 April 1879 – for the murder of Pintagorah at Cossack on 31 January 1879

==== 1880s ====
- Ah Kett – 27 January 1883 – for the murder of Foo Ah Moy, at Cheritah Station, Roebourne on 2 July 1883
- John Collins – 27 January 1883 – for the murder of John King at the Kalgan River near Albany on 2 October 1882
- John Maroney – 25 October 1883 – for the murder of James Watson at Yellenup, Kojonup on 1 May 1883
- William Watkins – 25 October 1883 – for the murder of James Watson at Yellenup, Kojonup on 1 May 1883
- Henry Benjamin Haynes – 23 January 1884 – for the murder of his wife Mary Ann Haynes at Perth on 12 October 1883
- Thomas Henry Carbury – 23 October 1884 – for the murder of Constable Hackett at Beverley on 12 September 1884
- John Duffy – 28 January 1885 – for the murder of his wife Mary Sultana McGann at Fremantle on 21 November 1884
- Henry Sherry – 27 October 1885 – for the murder of Catherine Waldock at Quinderring, Williams on 16 September 1885
- Franz Erdmann – 4 April 1887 – for the murder of Anthony Johnson at McPhee's Creek, Kimberley on 27 October 1886
- William Conroy – 18 November 1887 – for the murder of John Snook at Fremantle Town Hall on 23 June 1887

=== Victoria Park ===
- James Malcolm – 14 April 1847 – Hanged at the site of the crime, the Burswood Estate (Victoria Park), for highway robbery and murder of Clark Gordon on 6 January 1847
- Samuel Stanley – 18 April 1855 – Hanged at Victoria Park for the murder of Catherine Dayly on the York Road
- Jacob – 18 April 1855 – Hanged at Victoria Park for the murder of Bijare at Gingin on 25 September 1854
- Yoongal – 14 July 1855 – Hanged at Victoria Park for the murder of Kanip at the Hotham River
- Yandan – 14 July 1855 – Hanged at Victoria Park for the murder by spearing of a ten-year-old girl named Yangerdan near York

== York ==
- Doodjeep – 7 July 1840 – Hanged in chains at the site of the crime, for the murders of Sarah Cook and her 8-month-old child on 18 May 1839 at Norrilong, York
- Barrabong – 7 July 1840 – Hanged in chains at the site of the crime for the murders of Sarah Cook and her 8-month-old child on 18 May 1839 at Norrilong, York

== Fremantle ==
- John Gaven – 6 April 1844 – Hanged at the Round House for the murder of George Pollard at South Dandalup

=== Fremantle Prison ===
Hanged at Fremantle Prison:

==== 1880s to 1890s ====
- Long Jimmy (alias Jimmy Long) – 2 March 1889 – A Malay, hanged for the murder of Claude Kerr on board the pearling lugger 'Dawn' at Cossack on 7 September 1888
- Ahle Pres (alias Harry Pres) – 8 November 1889 – A Singapore Malay, hanged for the murder of Louis, a Filipino, near Halls Creek, on 9 June 1889
- Ah Chi (alias Li Ki Hong) – 16 April 1891 – Hanged for the murder of Ah Gin at Daliak, York on 3 March 1891
- Chew Fong – 29 April 1892 – Hanged for the murder of Ah Pang at Meka Station on 23 Dec 1891
- Lyee Nyee – 29 April 1892 – Hanged for the murder of Ah Pang at Meka Station on 23 Dec 1891
- Yung Quonk (Young Quong) – 29 April 1892 – Hanged for the murder of Ah Pang at Meka Station on 23 Dec 1891
- Sin Cho Chi – 29 April 1892 – Hanged for the murder of George E.B Fairhead, at a Mill Stream out-station, near Roebourne
- Goulam Mahomet – 2 May 1896 – Hanged for the murder of Tagh Mahomet in the mosque at Coolgardie on 10 January 1896
- Jumna Khan – 31 March 1897 – Hanged for the murder of William Griffiths in High Street, Fremantle on 3 December 1896

==== 1900s ====
- Pedro De La Cruz – 19 July 1900 – Hanged for the murder of Captain John Arthur Reddell of the brigantine Ethel, his 19-year-old son Leslie, the mate James Taylor, and two crew-members (Ando, who was Japanese, and Jimmy, who was Aboriginal), at the La Grange Bay pearling grounds, near Broome, on 19 October 1899
- Peter Perez – 19 July 1900 – Hanged for the murder of Captain John Arthur Reddell of the brigantine Ethel, his 19-year-old son Leslie, the mate James Taylor, and two crew-members (Ando, who was Japanese, and Jimmy, who was Aboriginal), at the La Grange Bay pearling grounds, near Broome, on 19 October 1899
- Samuel Peters – 9 September 1902 – Hanged for the murder of his wife Trevenna Peters at Leederville on 3 July 1903
- Stelios Psichitas – 15 April 1903 – Greek national, hanged for the rape and murder of his sister-in-law Sophia Psichitas (nee Leadakis) and murder of his 4-month-old nephew Emanuel at Lawlers on 20 December 1902
- Fredric Maillat – 21 April 1903 – French national, hanged for the murder of Charles Lauffer, at Smith's Mill, Glen Forest, on 4 February 1903
- Sebaro Rokka – 7 July 1903 – Hanged for the murder of Dollah and another Malay at Point Cunningham, near Derby on 20 February 1903
- Ah Hook – 11 January 1904 – Hanged for the murder of Yanoo, a Japanese laundryman, at Carnarvon on 26 August 1903
- Manoor Mohomet – 4 May 1904 – Hanged for the murder of Meer, an Afghan, at Kensington, near Menzies on 16 November 1903
- Simeon Espada – 14 December 1905 – Hanged for the murder of Mark Lieblig at Broome on 30 August 1905
- Charles Hagen – 14 December 1905 – Hanged for the murder of Mark Lieblig at Broome on 30 August 1905
- Pablo Marquez – 14 December 1905 – Hanged for the murder of Mark Lieblig at Broome on 30 August 1905
- Antonio Sala – 19 November 1906 – Hanged for the murder of Battista Gregorini at Mt Jackson on 13 September 1906
- Augustin De Kitchilan – 23 October 1907 – Hanged for the murder of Leah Fouracre at Peppermint Grove Farm, Waroona on 15 or 16 August 1907
- Harry G. Smith – 23 March 1908 – Hanged for the murder of William John Clinton at Day Dawn on 5 January 1908
- Iwakichi Oki – 22 October 1908 – Hanged for the murder of James Henry Shaw at West Murray, Pinjarra on 23 August 1908
- Martha Rendell – 6 October 1909 – Hanged for the murder of her 14-year-old stepson Arthur Morris by poisoning on 8 October 1908, suspected of killing two younger stepchildren

==== 1910s to 1960s ====
- Peter Robustelli – 9 February 1910 – Hanged for the murder of Giovanni Forsatti in a lane between Bayley and Woodward streets, Coolgardie on 19 October 1909
- Alexander Smart – 7 March 1911 – Hanged for the murder of Ethel May Harris at 5 Cowle Street, West Perth on 10 March 1910
- David H Smithson – 25 July 1911 – Hanged for the rape and murder of 18-year-old Elizabeth Frances Compton at Woodlupine on 13 May 1911
- Charles Spargo – 1 July 1913 – Hanged for the murder of Gilbert Pickering Jones at Broome on 23 January 1913
- Charles H. Odgers – 14 January 1914 – Hanged for the murder of Edith Molyneaux at Balgobin, Dandalup on 3 October 1913; also charged with murder of Richard Thomas Williams at Waroona on 14 September 1913
- Andrea Sacheri (alias Joseph Cutay) - 12 April 1915 – Hanged for the murder of 11-year-old Jean Bell at Marrinup, near Dwellingup, on 12 January 1915
- Frank Matamin (alias Rosland) – 12 March 1923 – Hanged for the murder of Zareen at Nullagine on 27 August 1922
- Royston Rennie – 2 August 1926 – Hanged for the murder of John Roger Greville on the train between East Perth and Perth stations on 3 June 1926
- William Coulter – 25 October 1926 – Hanged for the murders of Inspector John Walsh and Sergeant Alexander Pitman near Boulder on 28 April 1926
- Phillip J. Trefene – 25 October 1926 – Hanged for the murders of Inspector John Walsh and Sergeant Alexander Pitman near Boulder on 28 April 1926
- John Sumpter Milner – 21 May 1928 – Hanged for the rape and murder of 11-year-old Ivy Lewis at Darkan on 28 February 1928
- Clifford Hulme – 3 September 1928 – Hanged for the murder of Harold Eaton Smith at Wubin on 22 June 1928
- Antonio Fanto – 18 May 1931 – Hanged for the murder of Cosimo Nesci (sometimes Nexi, Xesci) at Latham on 20 March 1931
- John Thomas Smith (Snowy Rowles) – 13 June 1932 – Hanged for the murder of Louis George Carron near the 183 mile gate on the No. 1 Rabbit-proof fence, near Youanmi, on or about 20 May 1930
- Karol Tapci – 23 June 1952 – Hanged for the murder of Norman Alfred Perfect at Wubin on 17 March 1952
- Robert Jeremiah Thomas – 18 July 1960 – Hanged for the murder of taxi-driver Keith Mervyn Campbell Wedd at Claremont on 22 June 1959. Also charged with the murder of 21-year-old John Maxwell O'Hara and 17-year-old Kaye Marion O'Hara in Jimbell St, Mosman Park on the same day.
- Mervyn Allan Fallows – 6 June 1961 – Hanged for the rape and murder of 11-year-old Sandra Dorothea Smith at North Beach on or before 29 December 1960
- Brian William Robinson – 20 January 1964 – Hanged for the murder of Constable Noel Iles at Belmont on 9 February 1963
- Eric Edgar Cooke – 26 October 1964 – Hanged for murder of John Lindsay Sturkey at Nedlands on 27 January 1963

== Mullewa ==
- Wangayackoo – 28 January 1865 - Hanged at Butterabby, the site of the crime, for the spearing of Thomas Bott
- Yermakarra – 28 January 1865 - Hanged at Butterabby, the site of the crime, for the spearing of Thomas Bott
- Garolee – 28 January 1865 - Hanged at Butterabby, the site of the crime, for the spearing of Thomas Bott
- Charlakarra – 28 January 1865 - Hanged at Butterabby, the site of the crime, for the spearing of Thomas Bott
- Williakarra – 28 January 1865 - Hanged at Butterabby, the site of the crime, for the spearing of Thomas Bott

== Kellerberrin ==
- Ngowee - 19 January 1866 - For the murder of Edward Clarkson on 21 August 1865, hanged at the site of the crime, at Dalbercuttin, near Kellerberrin
- Egup (Condor) - 21 April 1866 - For the murder of Edward Clarkson on 21 August 1865, hanged at the site of the crime, at Dalbercuttin, near Kellerberrin

== Albany ==
- Peter McKean (alias William McDonald) – 12 October 1872 – Hanged for the murder of William "Yorkie" Marriott on 30 June 1872 at Slab Hut Gully (Tunney), between Kojonup and Cranbrook

== Rottnest ==
- Tampin – 16 July 1879 – Hanged for the murder of John Moir at Stokes Inlet on 29 March 1877
- Wangabiddi – 18 Jun 1883 – Hanged for the murder of Charles Redfern at Minni-Minni on the Gascoyne River in May 1882
- Guerilla – 18 June 1883 – Hanged for the murder of Anthony Cornish at Fitzroy River on 12 December 1882
- Naracorie – 3 August 1883 – Hanged for the murder of Charles Brackell at Wandagee on the Minilya River on 31 July 1882
- Calabungamarra – 13 June 1888 – Hanged for the murder of a Chinese man, Indyco, at Hamersley Range

== Geraldton ==
- Sing Ong – 29 October 1884 – Hanged for the murder of Chung Ah Foo on 11 May 1884 at Shark Bay

== Halls Creek ==
- Tomahawk – 18 March 1892 – Hanged at Mount Dockerell, the site of the crime, for the murder of William Miller on 26 June 1891
- Dicky – 18 March 1892 – Hanged at Mount Dockerell, the site of the crime, for the murder of William Miller on 26 June 1891
- Chinaman (Jerringo) – 18 March 1892 – Hanged at Mount Dockerell, the site of the crime, for the murder of William Miller on 26 June 1891

== Roebourne ==
- Cooperabiddy – 20 March 1893 – Hanged for murder of James Coppin, described as a 'half-caste', at the Hamersley Ranges
- Doulga – 28 December 1896 – Hanged for the murder of John Horrigan at Lagrange Bay on 28 March 1896
- Caroling – 14 May 1900 – Hanged for the murder of Dr Edward Vines at Braeside station
- Poeling – 14 May 1900 – Hanged for the murder of Dr Edward Vines at Braeside station
- Weedabong – 14 May 1900 – Hanged for the murder of Dr Edward Vines at Braeside station

== Derby ==
- Lillimara – 21 October 1899 – hanged at Derby Gaol for murder of Thomas Jasper on 17 March 1897 on Oscar Range Station, Fitzroy Crossing
- Mullabudden – 12 May 1900 – hanged at Derby Gaol for murder of John Dobbie on 12 March 1899 at Mount Broome
- Woolmillamah – 12 May 1900 – hanged at Derby Gaol for murder of John Dobbie on 12 March 1899 at Mount Broome
