= Edward Conroy =

Edward Conroy may refer to:

- Edward T. Conroy, attorney and state senator in Maryland
- Ed Conroy (basketball) (Edward S. Conroy), American college basketball coach
- Edward Conroy, city manager of Medford, Massachusetts
- Sir Edward Conroy, 2nd Baronet (1809–1869), of the Conroy baronets

== See also ==
- Ed Conroy (disambiguation)
- Conroy (disambiguation)
