= Ed Conroy =

Ed Conroy may refer to:

- Ed Conroy (basketball) (born 1967), American college basketball coach
- Ed Conroy (politician) (1946 – 2020), Canadian politician

== See also ==
- Edward Conroy (disambiguation)
- Conroy (disambiguation)
