= John M. Conroy =

American aviation executive (1920–1979)

John M. "Jack" Conroy
- Born: December 14, 1920; Buffalo, New York, U.S.
- Died: December 5, 1979 (aged 58); Northridge, California, U.S.
- Resting place: Pistol Creek Ranch, Idaho, U.S.
- Other name: Jack
- Occupations: Businessman; aircraft designer
- Spouse: Married 4 times
- Children: 6
- Military career
- Allegiance: United States
- Branch: United States Army Air Forces; California Air National Guard
- Service years: 1942–1948 (USAAF) 1954–1957 and 1960–1961 (CANG)
- Rank: 2nd Lieutenant
- Units: 379th Bombardment Group, 8th Air Force, USAAC; 115th Fighter Interceptor Squadron, CAL ANG
- Conflicts: World War II; POW
- Awards: Purple Heart; Air Medal with two Oak Leaf Clusters; Distinguished Flying Cross

John Michael "Jack" Conroy (December 14, 1920 – December 5, 1979) was an American aviator and later businessman, whose company Aero Spacelines developed the Pregnant Guppy, Super Guppy, and Mini Guppy cargo aircraft. He later founded Conroy Aircraft and Specialized Aircraft in Santa Barbara, California.

He died December 5, 1979, of colon cancer.

== Early years ==
Jack Conroy was born in Buffalo, New York, later attended high school in Sand Springs, Oklahoma, and studied engineering at St. Gregory's College (St. Gregory's University) in Shawnee, Oklahoma. He hitched a ride on a freight train from Oklahoma to Hollywood, California, where he landed bit parts in films during the years of 1937–1940 under the screen name of Michael Conroy, since John Conroy was already taken. Some of the films were with "The Little Tough Guys". He attended the College of Theatre Arts at the Pasadena Playhouse.

== World War II ==
In 1940, against the advice of his agent who said "the big parts are coming", he hopped the S.S. Lurline (manifest records February 21, 1941) to Honolulu, Hawaii, where he learned to fly and made his first solo flight in 1941. He was working at Pearl Harbor as a civilian digging underground fuel tanks on Sunday, December 7, 1941, when the base was attacked. After witnessing the Japanese attack he immediately enlisted in the United States Army Air Forces.

In early 1942, just months after his 21st birthday, he was commissioned as a second lieutenant. "Jack" took flight instruction by Lt. F. D. Clasen in a Vultee BT-13 at Chico Army Air Field, class of '43-D squadron 2. As the pilot of a B-17, he was in command of a nine-man crew. He flew his B-17 across the North Atlantic and as part of the 379th Bombardment Group of the 8th Air Force, operating from Kimbolton, England, flew 19 missions over Germany. On his 19th mission, on November 30, 1944, his aircraft was shot down over German farmland. After his crew bailed out, he forced his way out of the nose door, dislocating and fracturing his shoulder and breaking his right arm in the process. He parachuted to earth, landing in a farmer's field somewhere near Zeitz, was captured, interrogated and interned as a prisoner of war at Stalag Luft I, Compound North 3, on the Baltic coast until the end of the war. Conroy remained on active duty with the USAAF until 1948, serving as a special air mission pilot and as an instructor in a reserve training unit. Following an honorable discharge from the service, he spent 12 years as an airline pilot.

== Record flights ==
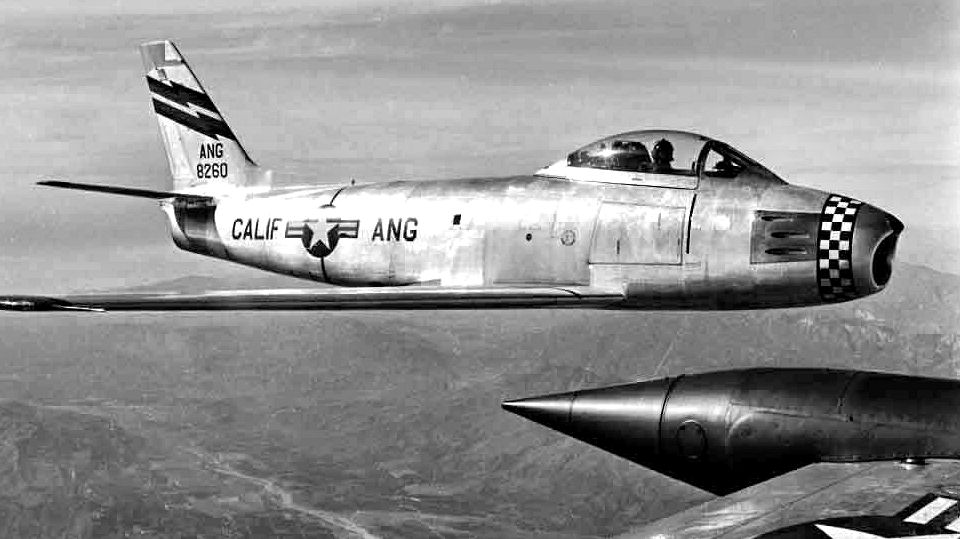
An F-86A-5-NA Sabre of 115th Fighter-Interceptor Squadron, 1955

After returning from the war, Conroy continued to fly with non-scheduled airlines and also joined the California Air National Guard, based at the Van Nuys Air Base. On May 21, 1955, Conroy, then a first lieutenant attached to the 115th Fighter Interceptor Squadron, completed "Operation Boomerang". This involved flying from coast to coast and back in one day during daylight hours. He flew an F-86A Sabre from Van Nuys to Floyd Bennett Field, New York, and returned using fuel stops both ways, setting a record of 5058 miles in 11 hours, 26 minutes, 33 seconds (442.0 mph). A decade later in 1965, Conroy and co-pilot Clay Lacy achieved another record-breaking flight in a Learjet. Operation "Sunrise Sunset" completed a round-trip flight from Los Angeles to New York and back, the first time a business jet made a round-trip flight across the U.S. between sunrise and sunset on the same day.

== The Pregnant Guppy – Aero Spacelines ==
The Pregnant Guppy had a humble beginning on the proverbial cocktail napkin. One evening Conroy, Lee Mansdorf and others were discussing the problems NASA were having transporting the rocket booster stages aboard ships through the Panama Canal and the Gulf of Mexico. Mansdorf had recently purchased several surplus Boeing 377 Stratocruisers but was not really sure what to do with them. Conroy believed that they could take one of the Stratocruisers, enlarge the fuselage enough to hold a rocket booster and contract with NASA to fly the boosters from California to Cape Canaveral, Florida. Conroy and Mansdorf founded a company, Aero Spacelines, to pursue the project.

Conroy's drive to build the aircraft was so great, that when financing ran out, he did not: "Conditions reached the point where Conroy no longer owned his house, cars, or furnishings." By flying the Guppy on borrowed aviation gasoline to the Marshall Space Flight Center, Conroy was able to test fly the aircraft with Wernher von Braun. On the basis of the test flights, contract negotiations with NASA began in earnest. The "Pregnant Guppy" first flew on September 19, 1962, piloted by Jack Conroy and co-pilot Clay Lacy. When Van Nuys air traffic control realized that Conroy intended to take off, they alerted police and fire departments to be on alert. However the huge aircraft performed flawlessly, the only difference in handling being a slight decrease in speed caused by extra drag of the larger fuselage. Wernher von Braun stated that "The Guppy was the single most important piece of equipment to put a man on the Moon in the decade of the 1960s."

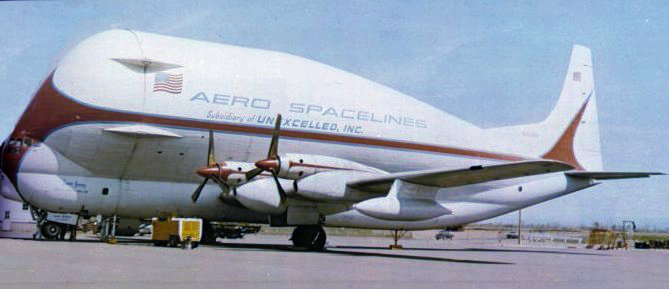
Super Guppy carrying a Saturn V Stage IVB

Conroy then developed the Super Guppy, which first flew on August 31, 1965, in Van Nuys. The Mini Guppy was built in Santa Barbara, California, and was christened "Spirit of Santa Barbara", on May 24, 1967. Two days later, the Mini Guppy was carrying cargo to the Paris Air Show, where in 1967, Conroy was awarded the "Medal of Paris" for the greatest contribution to aerospace for the prior two-year period for the Guppy aircraft.

Conroy was the founder and president of Aero Spacelines, a subsidiary of Unexcelled, Inc. until he resigned in August 1967.

== Conroy Aircraft ==
In 1968 he started Conroy Aircraft at Santa Barbara Airport. He developed the Conroy Skymonster, a modified turboprop Canadair CL-44 for the transport of oversized cargo (designated the CL-44-O), the Conroy Turbo Albatross, Conroy Stolifter (turboprop Cessna 337 Skymaster), and the Conroy Turbo Three (turboprop conversion of the Douglas DC-3). At this time he had acquired more than 20,000 hours flying time. A week after the first flight of the "Turbo-Three" (N4700C), he flew it to the 1969 Paris Air Show. The company was dissolved in 1972. The CL-44-O is currently at Bournemouth Airport, England.

== Specialized Aircraft ==
In 1972 he started Specialized Aircraft, originally known as Turbo-Three Corporation, in Santa Barbara. In 1974 the company proposed the Conroy Virtus to NASA for use as a Space Shuttle carrier aircraft, however it was rejected in favor of the Shuttle Carrier Aircraft. In 1976 the company relocated to Camarillo Airport in Camarillo, California, and developed the Conroy Tri-Turbo-Three, a modified Douglas DC-3 powered by three turboprop engines, which was used on contract with Polair Research. He christened this aircraft "The Spirit of Hope" for the City of Hope Hospital in Duarte, California, where he had been receiving treatment. This Tri-Turbo Three, N23SA, was used in 1984 to transport eight business people, members of the Seven Summits organization, plus three crew members to the Antarctic.

== Awards ==
- In 1967, John M. Conroy was awarded the "Medal of Paris" for the greatest contribution to aerospace for the prior two-year period for the Guppy aircraft.
- In 1973, John M. Conroy, "Guppy", was awarded the Character of the Year Award by the International Order of Characters.

== Film credits ==
- A Shot in the Dark (1941) — Messenger boy
- High School (1940) aka The Texas Kid — Boy
- A Fugitive from Justice (1940) a.k.a. Million Dollar Fugitive a.k.a. Waiting for Lepke — Office boy
- An Angel from Texas (1940) — Newsboy
- Castle on the Hudson (1940) — Newsboy
- Brother Rat and a Baby (1940) — Bellboy
- Four Wives (1939) — Florist boy
- First Offenders (1939) — Tony
- Newsboys' Home (1938) — Newsboy
