= Conroy Virtus =

Proposed American large transport aircraft intended to carry the Space Shuttle

Virtus
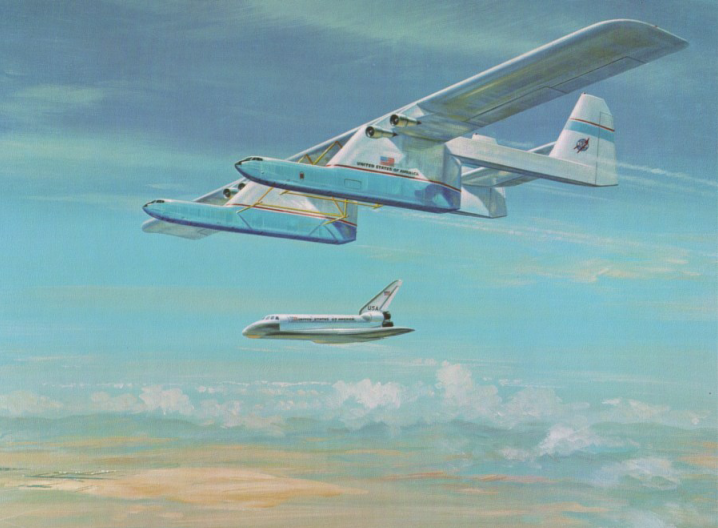
- Artist's concept of the Virtus

General information
- Type: Outsized cargo aircraft
- National origin: United States
- Manufacturer: Turbo-Three Corporation
- Designer: John M. Conroy
- Status: Canceled
- Primary user: NASA

History
- Developed from: Boeing B-52 Stratofortress

The Conroy Virtus was a proposed American large transport aircraft intended to carry the Space Shuttle. Designed, beginning in 1974, by John M. Conroy of the Turbo-Three Corporation, it was to incorporate a pair of Boeing B-52 Stratofortress fuselages to form a new craft using existing parts for cost-savings. While the project was seriously considered, it proved impractically large and NASA chose to develop the Boeing 747–based Shuttle Carrier from surplus commercial aircraft instead.

== History ==
The Space Shuttle was originally designed to use on-board turbofan engines for propulsion within the atmosphere on re-entry and for ferry flights between landing sites, such as Edwards Air Force Base, the White Sands Missile Range or contingency landing sites such as Easter Island, to the launch site at Kennedy Space Center at Cape Canaveral. When the air-breathing engines were deleted from the Shuttle design due to cost and weight concerns, a requirement arose for a transport aircraft capable of carrying the Shuttle from landing sites back to the Kennedy Space Center. One early design for a shuttle carrier aircraft was proposed by John M. Conroy, developer of the Pregnant Guppy and Super Guppy oversized cargo aircraft, in cooperation with the NASA Langley Research Center; named Virtus, a contract was issued for design and development work in 1974.

Expected to cost US$12.5 million each (equivalent to $61.7 million in 2024), Virtus was a twin-fuselage design powered by four large jet engines; it was intended for these to be Pratt & Whitney JT9D turbofans. Conroy proposed extensive use of 'off the shelf' military parts in the design to reduce costs; this included the use of fuselages from Boeing B-52 Stratofortress strategic bombers to form the aircraft's main fuselage pods, added to a new wing and tail section. The Space Shuttle Orbiter would be carried under the center section of the Virtus aircraft's wing, between the fuselages; other large cargoes, including the Space Shuttle external tank, the Space Shuttle Solid Rocket Boosters, or dedicated cargo pods, could be alternatively carried.

The Virtus design was tested in the NASA Langley wind tunnel; while the results of the wind tunnel tests were considered promising, the drawbacks of such a large design, including the cost of developing an entirely new aircraft, flight testing the design and the sheer size of the aircraft requiring the development and/or expansion of infrastructure to support it, militated against further development of Virtus. The Lockheed Corporation, which had proposed a twin-fuselage version of its C-5 Galaxy airlifter to carry the Shuttle, also saw its proposal rejected for the same reasons. A more modest conversion of existing C-5s was proposed and nearly taken up by NASA but it was determined that having aircraft continually available was preferable to being restricted by the United States Air Force on the use of C-5s and a proposal by Boeing for a conversion of the 747 airliner was selected, becoming the Shuttle Carrier Aircraft. A proposed commercial version of the Virtus design, named Colossus, also failed to gain any further interest, and the Virtus design was abandoned.

== Specifications ==
Data from Lowther 2012

General characteristics

- Wingspan: 450 ft (140 m)
- Wing area: 22,166 sq ft (2,059.3 m^{2})
- Aspect ratio: 9
- Max takeoff weight: 850,000 lb (385,554 kg)
- Powerplant: 4 × Pratt & Whitney JT9D-3A high-bypass turbofans, 45,800 lbf (204 kN) thrust each

Performance

- Cruise speed: 300 mph (480 km/h, 260 kn)
- Range: 3,000 mi (4,800 km, 2,600 nmi)
- Service ceiling: 35,000 ft (11,000 m)

== See also ==
- Antonov An-225 Mriya
- Scaled Composites Stratolaunch
- C-5 Shuttle Carrier

Related development

- Boeing B-52 Stratofortress

Aircraft of comparable role, configuration, and era

- Myasishchev VM-T
- Beriev Oceanic Liner
- Shuttle Carrier Aircraft
