= Conry =

Conry may refer to:

== People ==
- Joseph A. Conry (1868–1943), US politician
- Kieran Conry (born 1951), former Bishop of Arundel and Brighton, England
- Michael F. Conry (1870–1970), US politician
- Susan Conry, American engineering educator

== Places ==
Republic of Ireland

- Conry (civil parish), a civil parish in the barony of Rathconrath, County Westmeath

== See also ==
- Fláithrí Ó Maol Chonaire (also known as Florence Conry, Conroy, O'Mulconry; 1560–1629), Irish Franciscan and theologian
