= Conroy Stolifter =

Civil utility aircraft

General information
- Type: STOL conversion
- National origin: United States
- Manufacturer: Conroy Aircraft
- Status: Production complete
- Number built: 1

History
- Introduction date: 1968
- First flight: 1968
- Developed from: Cessna 337 Super Skymaster

The Conroy Stolifter was a conversion of the Cessna 337 Super Skymaster, developed by John M. Conroy of Conroy Aircraft starting in 1968.

== Development ==
The Stolifter was created by removing the Skymaster's rear engine and replacing the forward engine with a 575 shp (429 kW) Garrett AiResearch TPE 331-25A turboprop. The fuselage was extended to allow almost double the normal cargo volume. The aircraft was also fitted with a Robertson Aircraft Corporation STOL-kit.

The aircraft was intended for a range of military and civil roles, including cargo and troop transport, medevac, reconnaissance and parachute drop.

The aircraft is capable of taking off in 250 ft (76 m) and clearing a 50 ft (15 m) obstacle in 450 ft (137 m). On landing the approach speed is 51 mph (82 km/h), with a touch-down speed of 44 mph (71 km/h), giving a ground roll of as little as 200 ft (61 m).

Only one Stolifter was built. The conversion was approved and the single aircraft produced was given a standard Certificate of Airworthiness. The aircraft still exists as of 2023 and is based in Lyman, Washington, USA.

== Specifications (Stolifter) ==
Data from Flight International

General characteristics

- Crew: one
- Capacity: seven passengers
- Empty weight: 2,600 lb (1,179 kg)
- Gross weight: 4,700 lb (2,132 kg)
- Fuel capacity: 140 US Gallons (532 litres)
- Powerplant: 1 × Garrett AiResearch TPE 331-25A turboprop, 575 hp (429 kW)

Performance

- Cruise speed: 250 mph (400 km/h, 220 kn) at 20,000 feet
- Service ceiling: 40,000 ft (12,000 m)
- Rate of climb: 1,700 ft/min (8.6 m/s)
