= Meka Station =

Pastoral lease in Western Australia

Coordinates: 27.423°S 116.827°E

Location in Western Australia

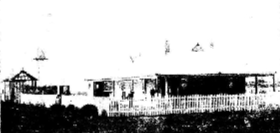
Meka Station homestead 1909

Meka Station, commonly referred to as Meka, is a pastoral lease that operates as a sheep station in Western Australia.

It is situated about 100 kilometres (62 mi) north of Yalgoo and 100 kilometres (62 mi) west of Cue in the Murchison area of the Mid-West region. The ephemeral Sandford River runs through the property. One of the adjoining properties is Kalli Station.

The property occupies an area of 365,904 hectares (904,168 acres). In 2009 the property was running 18,000 sheep but by 2010 only 8,000 remained; the flock was being killed by wild dogs. Meka also used to trap and sell wild goats, usually between 5,000 and 7,000 per year but by 2010 only 68 were trapped.

The property had been established in 1874 by William Silas Pearse, his brother George, and Thomas Little after they had conducted an expedition in the area. In 1882 there were reports of trouble with Aboriginal people stealing sheep in the area. In 1892 three Chinese nationals were executed after the men had murdered, Ah Pang, a Chinese national, at Meka in December 1891.

The Pearse brothers placed Meka on the market in 1909. When advertised, it occupied an area of 639,460 acres (258,780 ha) and was stocked with 13,147 sheep, 200 cattle and 70 horses. Improvements included 245 miles (394 km) of fencing dividing the property into 17 paddocks. 17 wells with windmills had been installed and another 26 wells had been sunk. At auction, property and stock were purchased by the brother, George Pearse, who lived in Fremantle, for the sum of £20,800. Mr G. Mosely was hired to manage the property in 1919; he stayed until 1922. The property was acquired in the same year by H. W. Clarkson, who died in 1925 following an operation. The property was being managed by Patrick Maxwell but was still owned by and trading under the name of the Clarkson's estate until at least 1952.

In 2013 the manager of Meka, Bob Grinham, announced his intention to fence off 10,000 hectares (24,711 acres) creating a single paddock where stock would be safe from dog attack. The existing fences were to be electrified.

During a heatwave in 2014 the temperature at Meka was recorded at just over 50 °C (122 °F).

== See also ==
- List of ranches and stations
