= Millington Conroy =

Inez Melson's nephew

Millington Conroy (12 August 1952) is a dealer of Marilyn Monroe artifacts. Conroy's mother, Ruth Conroy, was the sister-in-law of Inez Melson, who was Monroe's financial advisor. Conroy inherited a large number of Monroe's personal items from his mother, who had inherited them from Melson. Conroy and his collection were featured in the October 2008 Vanity Fair.

In 1994, Conroy was sued by Anna Strasberg to stop the sale of items in his collection. He was ordered by the court to turn over all Monroe items that he had testified to owning. In October 2007, Conroy was again sued by Monroe's estate over property that he had allowed a photographer to photograph in preparation for a book. The photographer, Mark Anderson, sued Conroy in May 2008 over the use of photographs taken by Anderson of the Monroe items.
