= Conroy Tri-Turbo-Three =

Aircraft

Tri-Turbo-Three
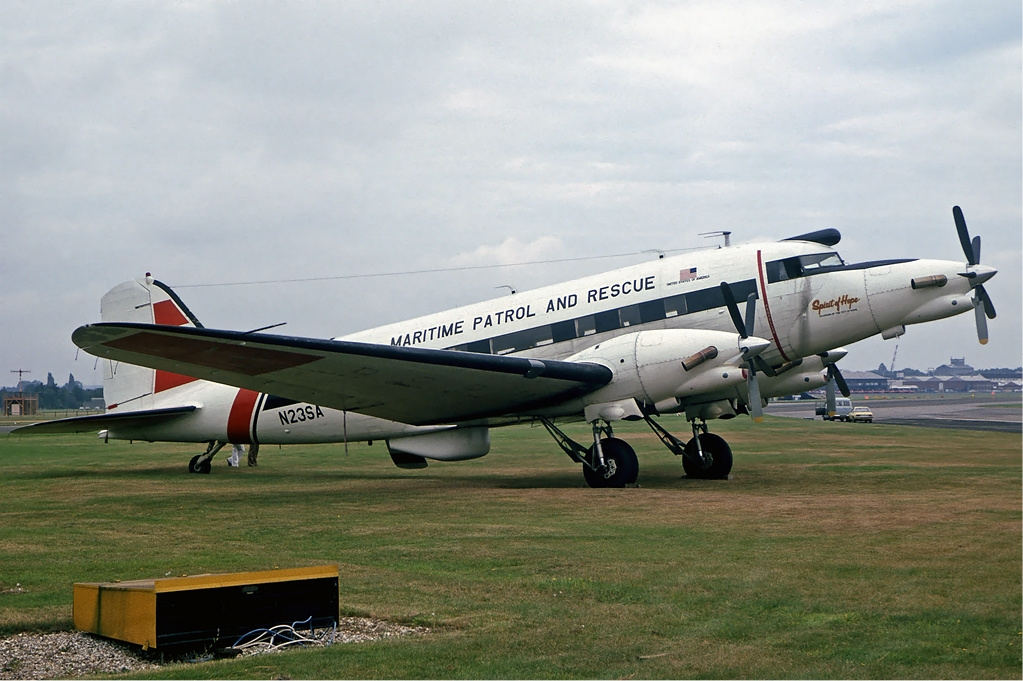
- Tri-Turbo-Three at Farnborough Airshow in 1978.

General information
- Type: Transport aircraft
- Manufacturer: Conroy Aircraft
- Status: Retired
- Primary users: Polair Maritime Patrol and Rescue
- Number built: 1

History
- First flight: 2 November 1977
- Developed from: Conroy Turbo-Three

The Conroy Tri-Turbo-Three was a Douglas DC-3 fitted with three Pratt & Whitney Canada PT6A turboprop engines by Conroy Aircraft; the third engine was mounted on the nose of the aircraft.

== Design and development ==
First flown on 2 November 1977, the cruise speed of the aircraft was increased to 230 mph (200 kn; 370 km/h). The engine mounted on the nose could be shut off, decreasing the speed to 180 mph (160 kn; 290 km/h) and increasing the range of the aircraft. It was used by Polair and Maritime Patrol and Rescue. It was fitted with skis for use in polar regions and flew in the North Pole region out of Resolute Bay Airport in Canada. It was uniquely suited for flying long distances and landing on rough, unprepared snow runways.

In this role it was instrumental in opening up the interior of Antarctica to private expeditions and tourism. Most notable was a 1983 expedition transporting eight members of the Seven Summits expedition, plus a crew of three, to the Antarctic for a first-ever assault on Mount Vinson. After being relegated to a Tucson boneyard, it was purchased by Warren Basler in 1992.

== Specifications ==
Data from The Illustrated Encyclopedia of Propeller Airliners

General characteristics

- Crew: 3
- Capacity: 12,000 lb (5,443 kg) cargo
- Wingspan: 95 ft (29 m)
- Height: 18 ft 3 in (5.56 m)
- Wing area: 987 sq ft (91.7 m^{2})
- Max takeoff weight: 29,000 lb (13,154 kg) (PT6A-41)
- Powerplant: 3 × Pratt & Whitney Canada PT6A-45 turboprop engines, 1,174 shp (875 kW) (ehp) each

Performance

- Cruise speed: 230 mph (370 km/h, 200 kn) (three engines) - 180 mph (160 kn; 290 km/h) (one engine stopped)
- Range: 2,700 mi (4,300 km, 2,300 nmi)

== See also ==
- John M. Conroy

Related development

- Conroy Turbo-Three
- Douglas C-47 Skytrain
- Douglas DC-3

Aircraft of comparable role, configuration, and era

- Basler BT-67

Related lists

- List of aircraft of World War II
- List of civil aircraft
