= Martin Conroy =

American advertising executive (1922–2006)

- Born: December 13, 1922; New York City, New York, US
- Died: December 19, 2006 (aged 84); Branford, Connecticut, US
- Education: College of the Holy Cross (BA)
- Occupation: Advertising executive
- Known for: "Two Young Men" letter
- Spouse: Joan Crowley (m. 1949)
- Children: 8

Martin Francis Conroy Jr. (December 13, 1922 – December 19, 2006) was an American advertising executive best known for a direct mail ad for the Wall Street Journal that was in continuous use for 28 years, from 1975 to 2003.

== Biography ==
Conroy was born in Manhattan in 1922 to Martin Francis Conroy Sr. and his wife. After graduating from Xavier High School, he studied English at the College of the Holy Cross, graduating in 1943. While there, he joined Delta Epsilon Sigma. He then served in the United States Army, spending a year and a half in Germany in the European Theatre. Upon his return, he worked as a copywriter at Bloomingdale's before joining the editorial staff of Esquire magazine. In 1950, he joined BBDO, where he later served as vice president. He left in 1979 to work as an independent consultant.

While a freelancer, he wrote what is considered one of the most successful soft sell advertisements in American history. Known as the "Two Young Men" letter, it ran in newspapers for nearly 30 years and earned an estimated $2 billion in subscription sales.

On a beautiful late spring afternoon, twenty-five years ago, two young men graduated from the same college. They were very much alike, these two young men. Both had been better than average students, both were personable and both — as young college graduates are — were filled with ambitious dreams for the future.

Recently, these men returned to their college for their 25th reunion.

They were still very much alike. Both were happily married. Both had three children. And both, it turned out, had gone to work for the same Midwestern manufacturing company after graduation, and were still there.

But there was a difference. One of the men was a manager of a small department of that company. The other was its president.

Though the two-page "Dear Reader" letter does not explicitly state that the more successful man subscribed to the Wall Street Journal, the rest of the advertisement laid out all the ways one could better oneself through a subscription. He took the idea from an ad written by Bruce Fairchild Barton for Alexander Hamilton Institute in 1919, which started: "From a certain little town in Massachusetts, two men went to the Civil War. Each of them had enjoyed the same educational advantage, and so far as anyone could judge, their prospects for success were equally good."

== Personal life ==
Conroy and his wife Joan married in 1949 and had eight children. He died in Branford, Connecticut from complications of lung cancer. At the time of his death, he lived between Madison, Connecticut and Captiva, Florida.
