= John Conroy Hutcheson =

Jersey writer

John Conroy Hutcheson (1840–1897) was a British author of novels and short stories about life aboard ships at sea.

Hutcheson was born in Jersey, Channel Islands, in 1840, and died in Portsea Island, Hampshire, in late 1896 or early 1897.

== Works ==
Some of his works with a nautical theme include:

- Picked Up at Sea; or, the Gold Miners of Minturne Creek. And other stories, etc. (1884, Blackie & Son: London)
- On Board the “Esmeralda”; or, Martin Leigh’s log. A sea story ... (1885, Cassell & Co.: London)
- The Wreck of the Nancy Bell; or, Castaway on Kerguelen Land (1885, Blackie & Son, London)
- The Penang Pirate and the Lost Pinnace. (1885, Blackie & Son: London)
- Fritz and Eric; or the brother Crusoes ... (1886, Hodder & Stoughton: London)
- Tom Finch’s monkey and how he dined with the Admiral, and other yarns, etc. (1886, Blackie & Son: London). Includes "Our Scratch Eleven".
- The White Squall: a Story of the Sargasso Sea (1887 and 1893, Blackie & Son, London)
- Bob Strong’s Holidays; or, Adrift in the Channel, etc. (1897, Jarrold & Sons, London)
- Afloat at Last. A sailor boy’s log of his life at sea, etc. (1890, Blackie & Son, London)
- The Ghost Ship (1903: Ward Lock & Co., Ltd, London)
- The Island Treasure, also known as The Black Man’s Ghost (1889, Ward Lock & Co. Ltd, London)
- Young Tom Bowling

Other works include:

- Teddy: the story of a “Little Pickle” ... (1887, Blackie & Son: London)
- She and I. - A love story: a life history. Volume one. (1873, London, Guildford)
- She and I. - A love story: a life history. Volume two. (1873, London, Guildford)
