= Susan Conry =

American computer engineer

Susan E. Conry is an American computer engineer and engineering educator known for her efforts in higher education accreditation, including leading the merger of the Computing Sciences Accreditation Board into ABET (the Accreditation Board for Engineering and Technology) in the late 1990s. Her research concerns multi-agent systems; she is a professor emerita and former Distinguished Service Professor of Electrical and Computer Engineering at Clarkson University.

== Education and career ==
Conry majored in mathematics at Rice University, graduating in 1971; she continued at Rice for graduate study in electrical engineering, completing her Ph.D. in 1975. She joined the Clarkson University faculty in 1975, and chaired the Clarkson Department of Electrical and Computer Engineering from 1996 to 2001, the first female chair of an engineering department at Clarkson. She retired as professor emerita in 2015.

She was president of the Computing Sciences Accreditation Board in 1997–1998, and it was in her term that the CSAB and ABET agreed to merge.

== Recognition ==
Conry was named a Fellow of ABET in 2005, and won the 2005 IEEE Meritorious Achievement Award "for contributions to computer science and engineering accreditation, to the development of Computing Sciences Accreditation Board (now CSAB, Inc.), for leadership in the integration of ABET and CSAB, and the development of model curricula". She was elected as an IEEE Fellow in 2011 "for contributions to engineering education". Clarkson University named her Distinguished Service Professor of Electrical and Computer Engineering in 2008.
