= Ó Cíonga =

Prominent family of Irish heritage

Ó Cionga was the name of an Irish Brehon family of Lough Ree, County Westmeath, who spread to neighbouring areas such as County Longford and County Offaly.

== See also ==
- Tomas O Cinga, died 1342
- Muircheartach Ó Cionga, Old Testament translator and scribe, c. 1562-c.1639.
