= Fremantle Town Hall =

Town hall in Fremantle, Western Australia

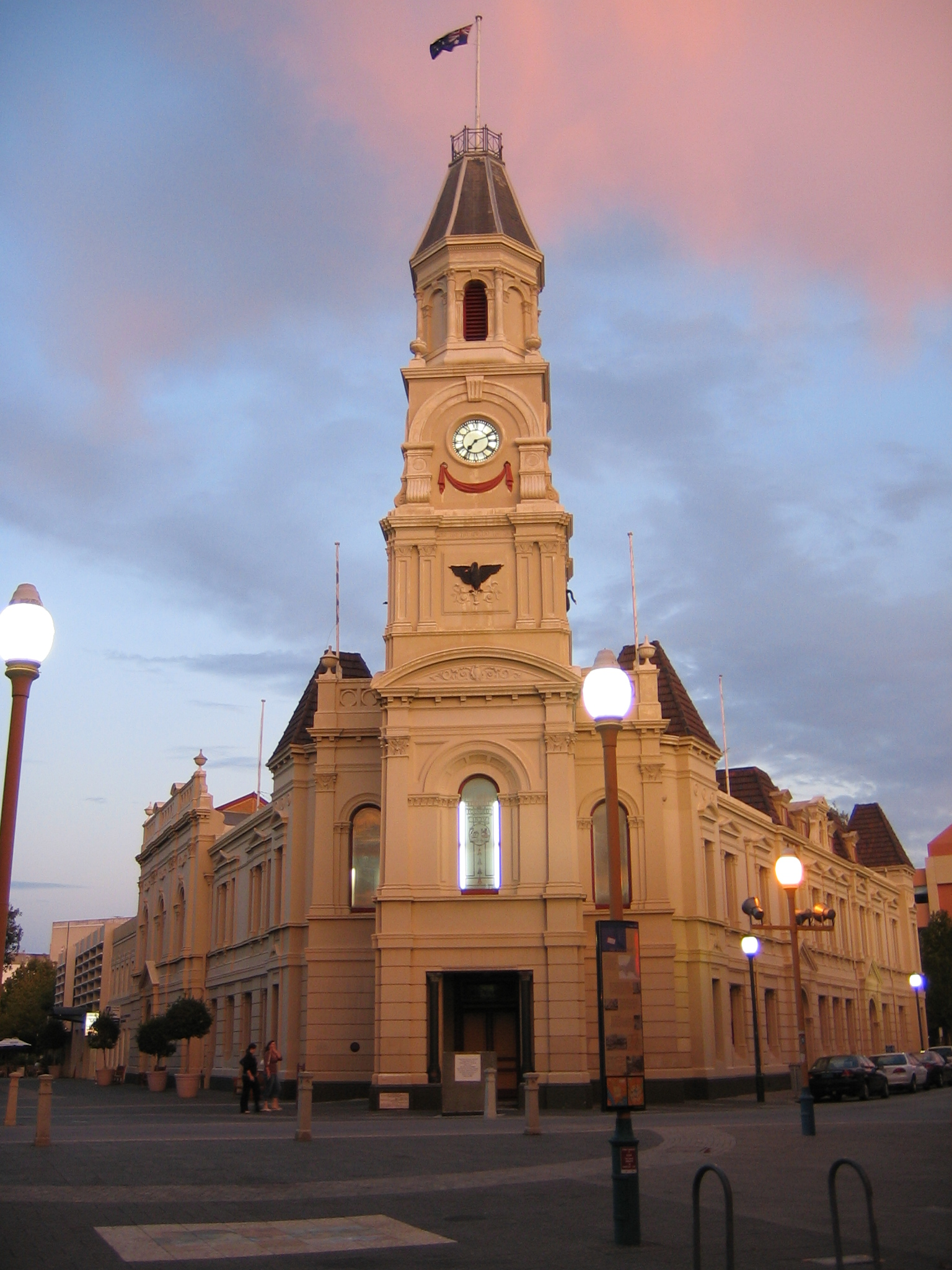
- The building remains almost unchanged since construction
- Interactive map of the Fremantle Town Hall area

General information
- Type: Town hall
- Location: Fremantle, Western Australia
- Coordinates: 32°03′15″S 115°44′52″E

Western Australia Heritage Register
- Type: State Registered Place
- Designated: 9 November 1993
- Reference no.: 1015

Fremantle Town Hall is a town hall located in the portside city of Fremantle, Western Australia, and situated on the corner of High, William and Adelaide Streets. The official opening, on 22 June 1887, coincided with the celebration of Queen Victoria's Jubilee and it was formally named by the mayor, Daniel Keen Congdon and the state governor, Frederick Broome, as the Town and Jubilee Hall.

== Plans ==
On 7 June 1876, Councillor E. H. Higham suggested that the council should approach the Colonial Secretary to have a government reserve, on the corner of South Terrace and Essex Street, set aside to build a town hall. The use of the site was approved by the state governor, William Robinson, who offered convict labour for the construction as well as free design and specification preparation by the government engineer, and promised to seek a liberal grant from the Legislative Council for the construction project. The government engineer drafted plans are no longer extant.

On 11 July a ratepayers' meeting talked of the funds needed to build the town hall and W. E. Marmion unsuccessfully suggested that a more central site in High Street be purchased instead. Plans did not go ahead as funding could not be met.

The more central site that had been previously suggested was bought by the council in 1876 after the Church of England decided to demolish the first St John's church, located on what is now High Street, and build the current church in St John's Square. In doing this, they sold the southern part of their land to the council, which both funded the new church and resulted in a triangular area of land suitable for the new town hall.

In April 1881, the Chairman of the Council again raised the matter of the town hall. He proposed a building to cost no more than £8000, equivalent to A$1.3 million in 2022. Attempts to raise funds locally failed, and the architect behind the plans was rejected in favour of Melbourne architects John Grainger and Charles D'Ebro, who also designed the National Bank in Fremantle.

== Construction ==
Tenders were called in 1884 but none were chosen as they all exceeded the budget. After further modifications to the design, tenders were recalled and only one builder, Edward V. Keane, put forward a tender with four separate price ranges. These ranged from £19,832 to £12,400. The council decided to accept this builder but decided only to go ahead with the auditorium, supper room, kitchen and vestibule.

Another ratepayers meeting was held and the council was urged to go ahead with the plan for the entire building.

Building commenced on 28 May 1885 and the original finishing date was to be 28 November 1886. The foundation stone was laid on 10 September 1885 by Governor Frederick Napier Broome. The opening took place on 22 June 1887, after a seven-month delay to coincide with the celebration of the Queen's Jubilee. The ceremony was followed by a day of sports and a ball in the evening. Children attending government schools in Perth and Fremantle received an extra week's holiday.

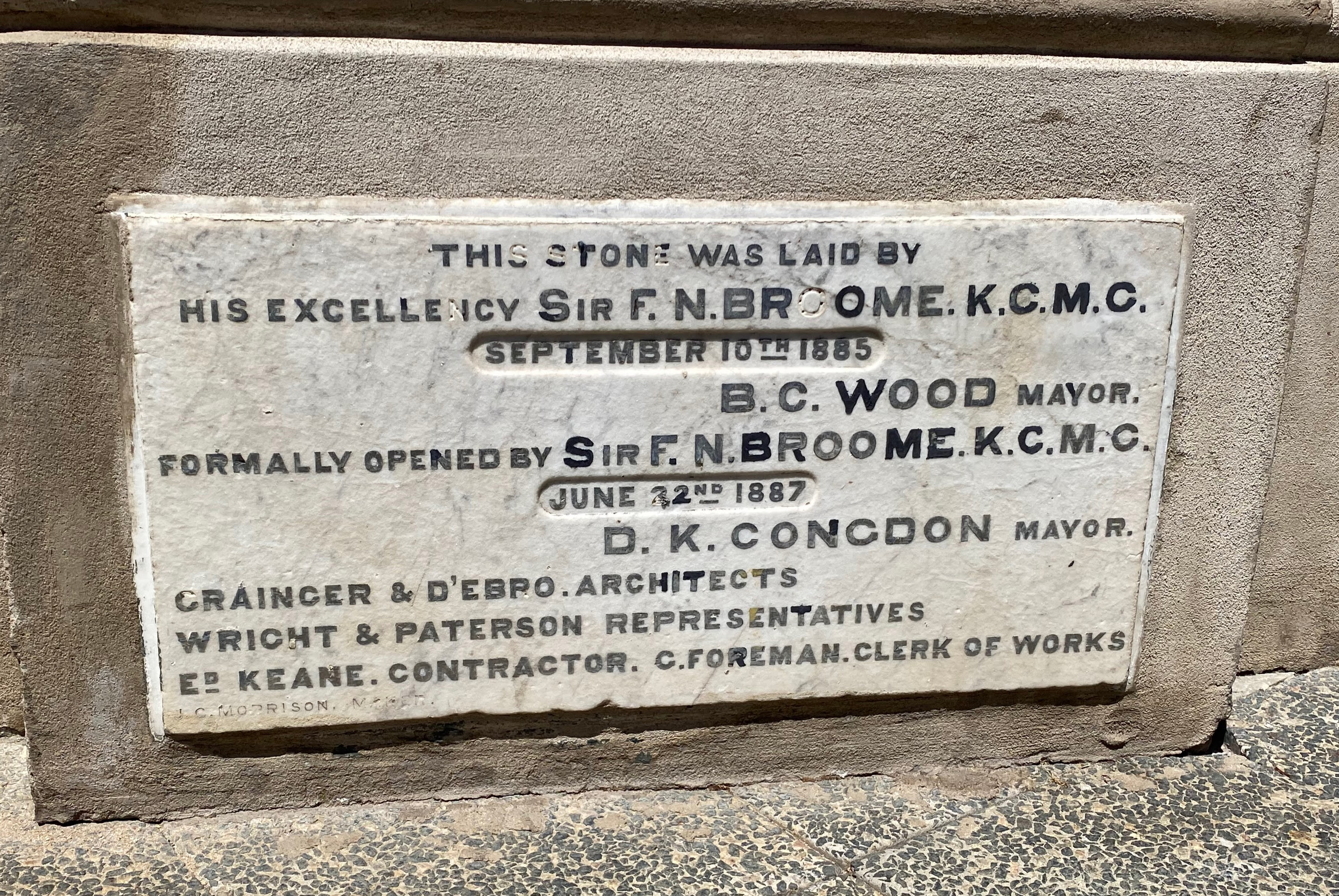
Fremantle Town Hall foundation stone

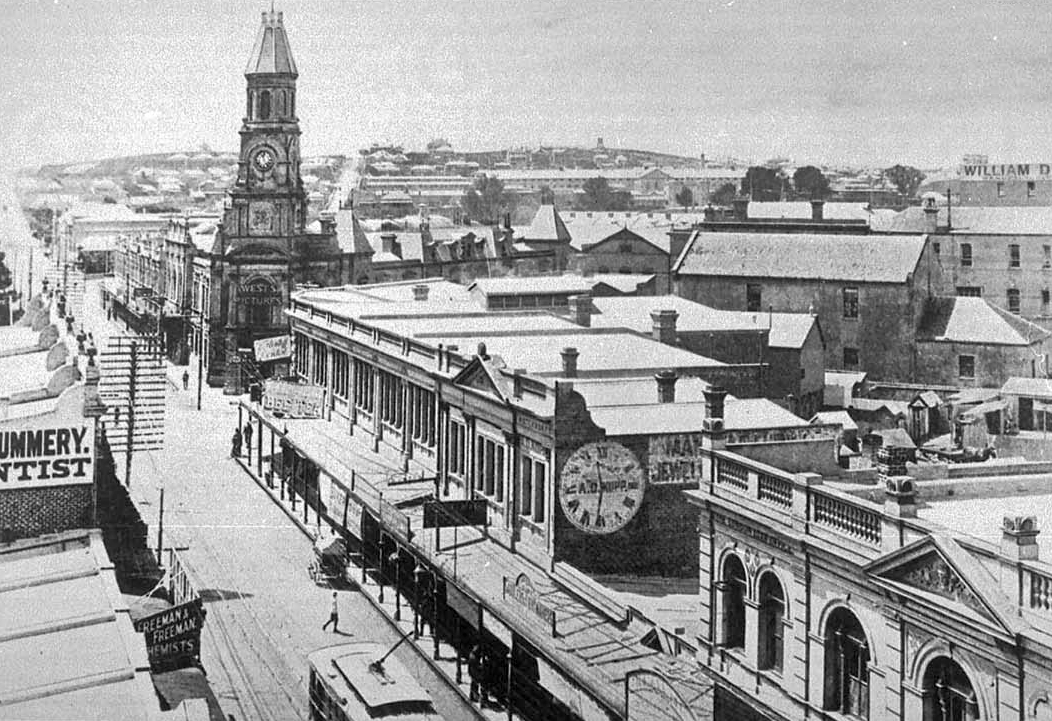
Fremantle Town Hall High Street 1909

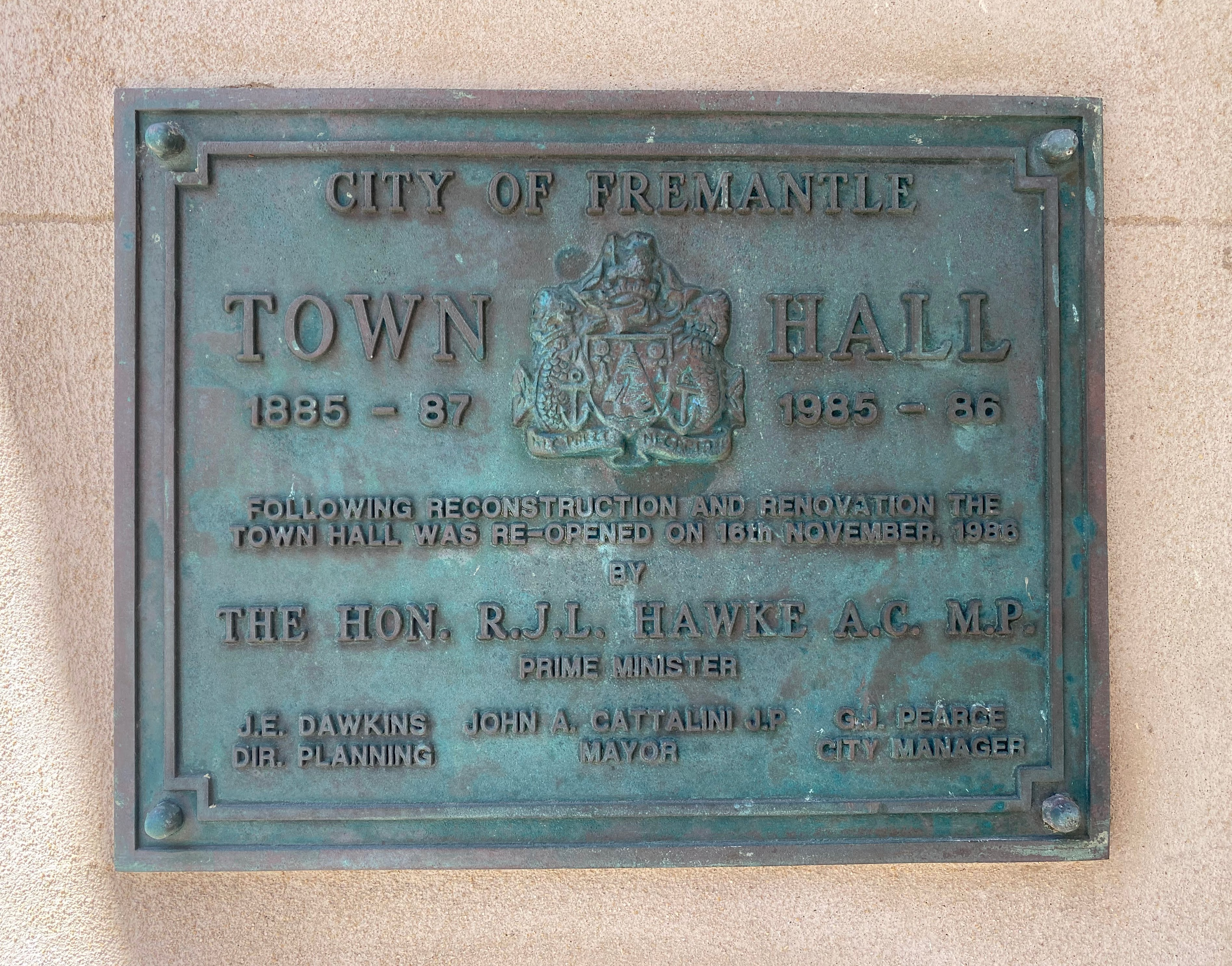
Plaque for reconstruction on Fremantle Town Hall

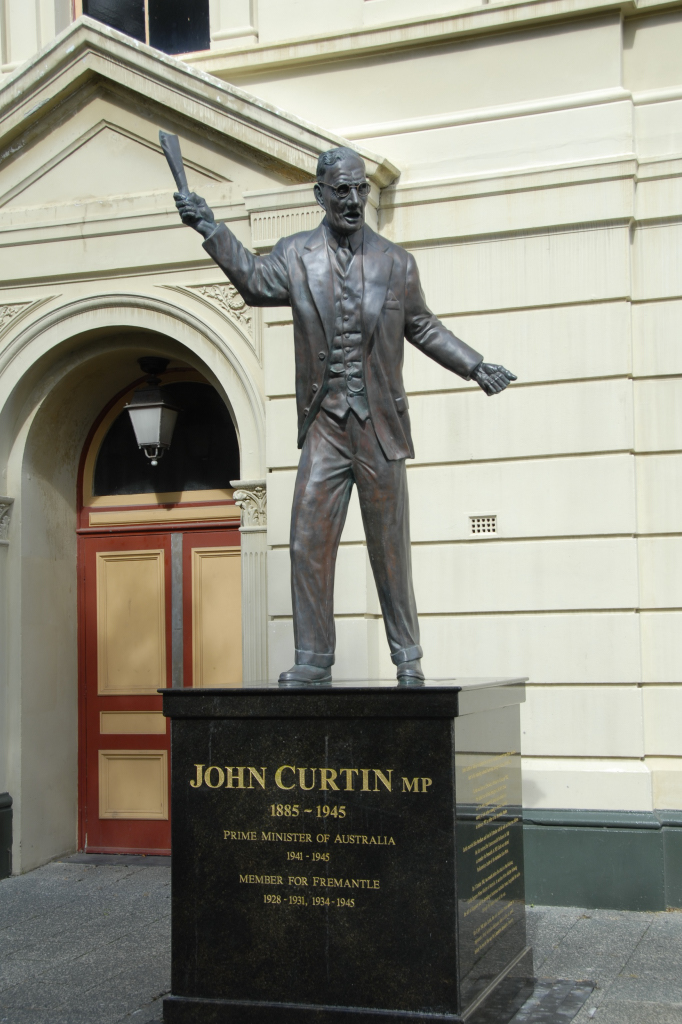
John Curtin statue at Fremantle Town Hall

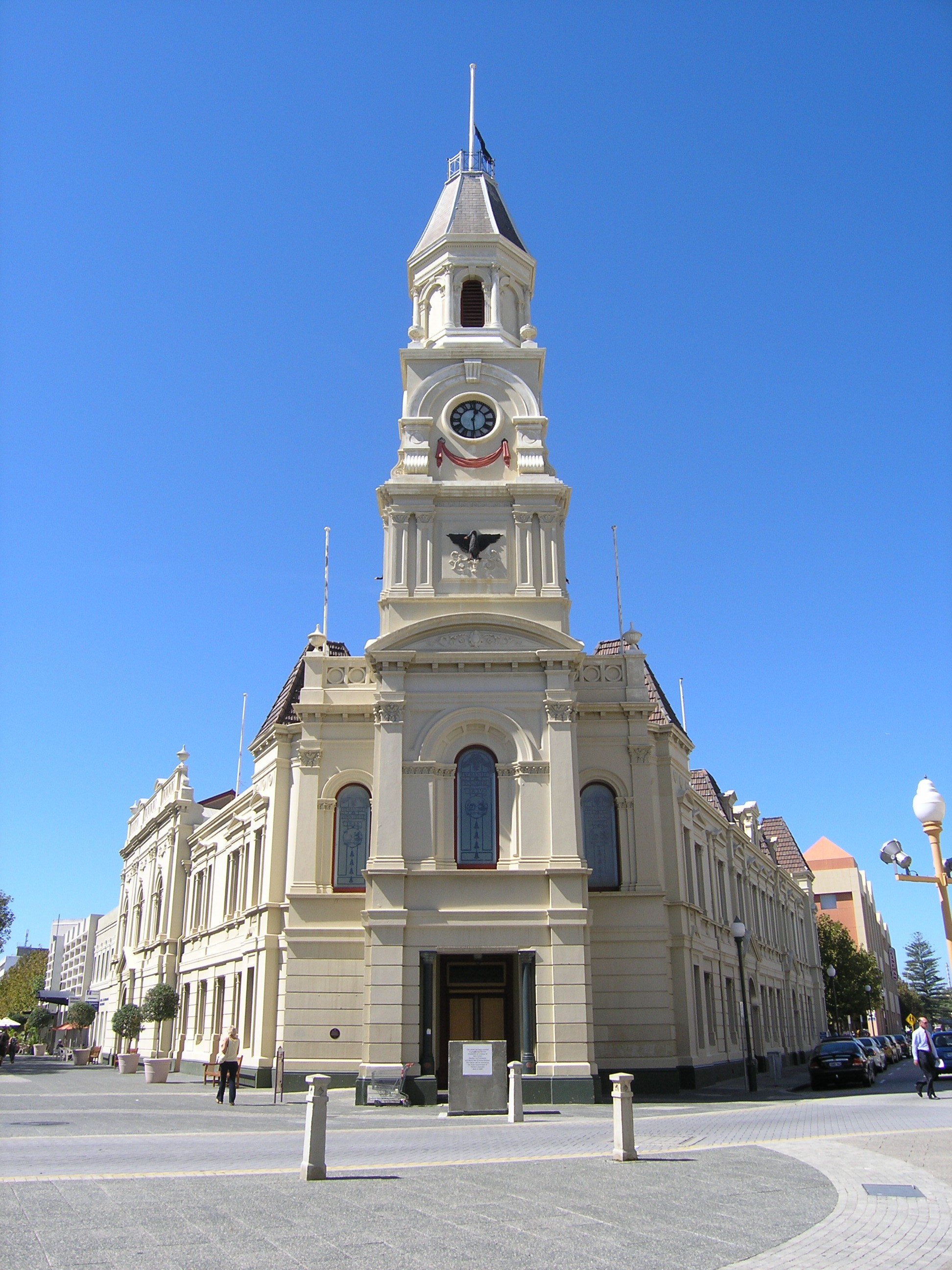
Fremantle Town Hall

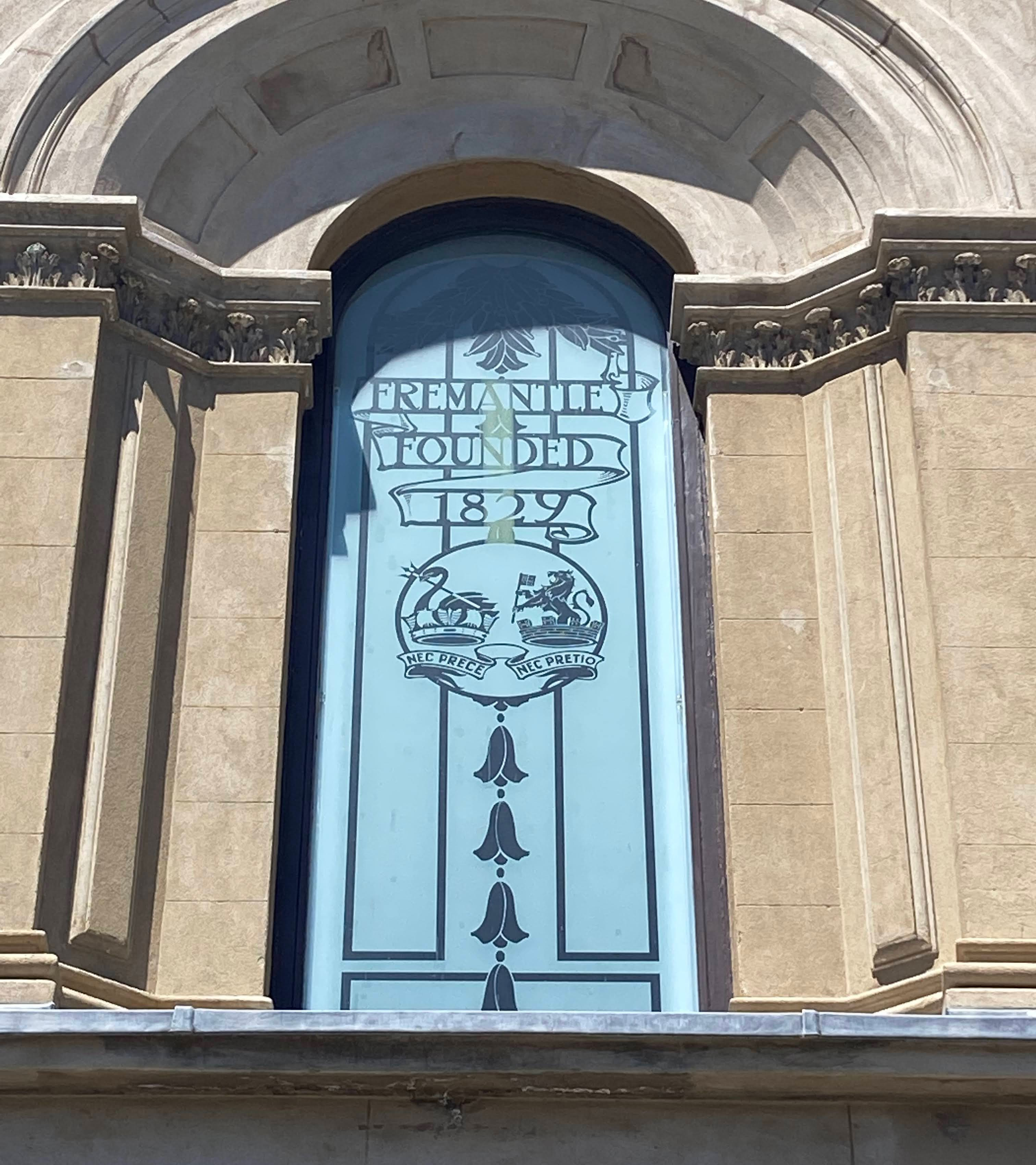
Fremantle Town Hall window detail

== Murder of W. J. Snook ==
On 23 June 1887 a children's fancy dress ball was held in the Hall. The Town Supervisor, W. J. Snook, and two other men had some trouble in keeping a group of rowdy men out of the Hall. Amongst the group was the landlord of the National Hotel in High Street, William Conroy, who gatecrashed the supper just after midnight, as the mayor was congratulating the stewards and officials on the "happy conclusion of the Jubilee". At 12:45 am, Conroy was seen in the entrance hall and soon after a shot was heard. Allegedly, Conroy had shot Snook because Snook would not let him in. Despite his injuries, Snook lived for three more months before dying in September. Conroy was convicted of the crime, becoming the last person to be hanged at Perth Gaol.

== Architecture ==
Local architects Griffiths and Considine, representing the Melbourne designers Grainger and D'Ebro, described the building thus:

The overall treatment to the elevation is a confident Victorian free style interpretation of classical architecture...the facades employ a multiplicity of classical elements including pediments, rusticated floor, Corinthian pilasters, pediment windows, urns, string courses, heavily moulded architraves and bas relief decoration – all rendered to appear stone...at the roof level "classicism" gives way to an exuberant array of towers not encountered in classical architecture.
