= Basler BT-67 =

Aircraft based on the Douglas DC-3

BT-67
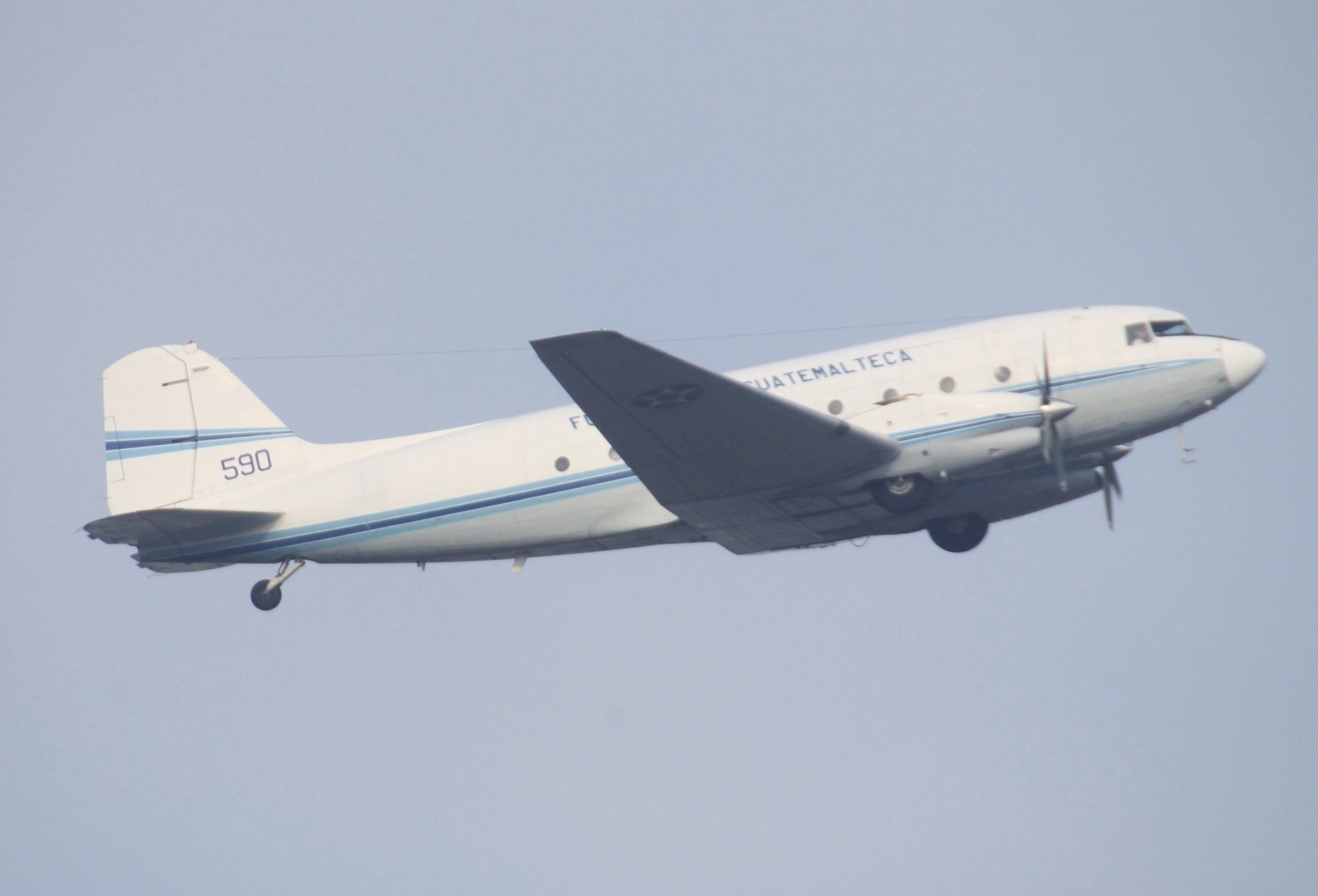
- A BT-67 of the Guatemalan Air Force

General information
- Type: Utility aircraft
- National origin: United States
- Manufacturer: Basler Turbo Conversions
- Status: In service
- Number built: 70

History
- Manufactured: 1990–present
- First flight: 1990
- Developed from: Douglas DC-3; Douglas C-47 Skytrain

The Basler BT-67 is a utility aircraft produced by Basler Turbo Conversions of Oshkosh, Wisconsin. It is a remanufactured and modified airframe of the Douglas C-47 Skytrain or the Douglas DC-3; the modifications are designed to significantly extend the DC-3's serviceable lifetime.

== Development ==
The design was based upon a single airframe that United States Aircraft had begun converting. After the company closed, the aircraft was moved to Oshkosh, where work was completed. It was then tested in Alaska and contracted to the U.S. Forest Service.

By March 1989, production of eight airframes had begun at a plant in Van Nuys, California. An additional production line opened in a purpose-built 75,000-square-foot (7,000 m^{2}) facility on the east side of Wittman Regional Airport by February 1990. United Technologies, owner of the manufacturer of the PT6, became a distributor for the BT-67 that October. At the same time, it agreed to oversee a subcontractor performing conversion work using kits in Taiwan. Early in production, four airplanes were seized by the federal government as part of an investigation into drug trafficking, but released after Basler was cleared of any wrongdoing.

== Design ==
Basler Turbo Conversions was founded in 1990 solely to convert existing C-47 and DC-3 airframes into BT-67s. Basler configures each conversion to a client's specifications. Industries served include cargo, military, cloudseeding, and scientific research. The conversion includes fitting the airframe with new Pratt & Whitney Canada PT6A-67R turboprop engines, lengthening the fuselage, strengthening the airframe, upgrading the avionics, and making modifications to the wings' leading edges and wingtips.

Due to the higher fuel consumption of the turbine engines of the BT-67, compared to the original piston designs fitted to the standard DC-3, range on the standard fuel tank, with a 45 minute reserve, is reduced from 1,160 to 950 nautical miles (2,150 to 1,760 km). Basler provides a long-range fuel tank which increases the aircraft range to 2,140 nmi (3,960 km).

=== Gunship version ===
The Basler BT-67 has a gunship version used by the Colombian Aerospace Force as of 2017 for counterinsurgency operations. The Colombian gunships are equipped with a forward-looking infrared (FLIR) ball, enabling the aircraft to conduct effective nighttime missions.

== Operators ==
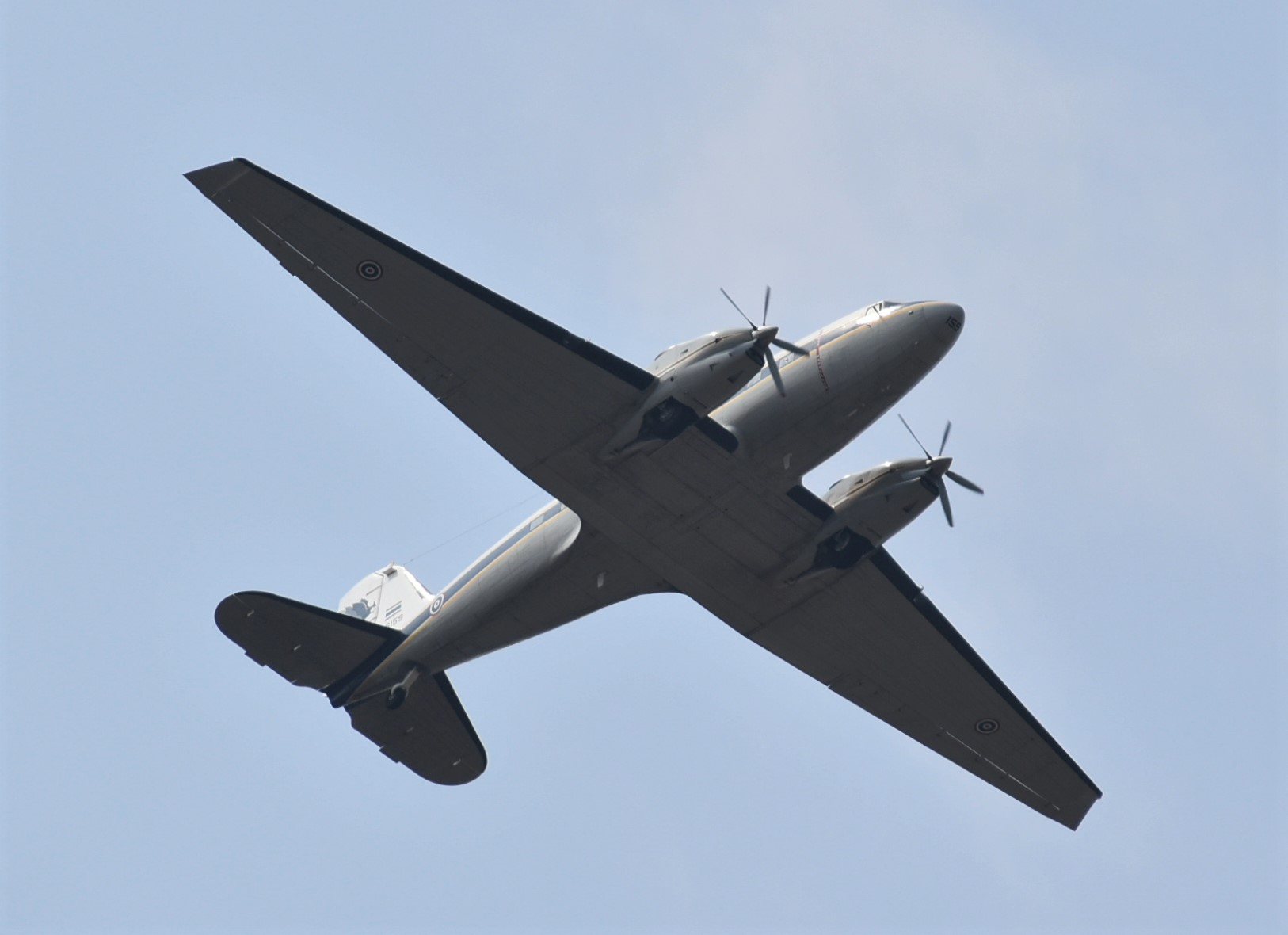
A BT-67 of the Royal Thai Air Force

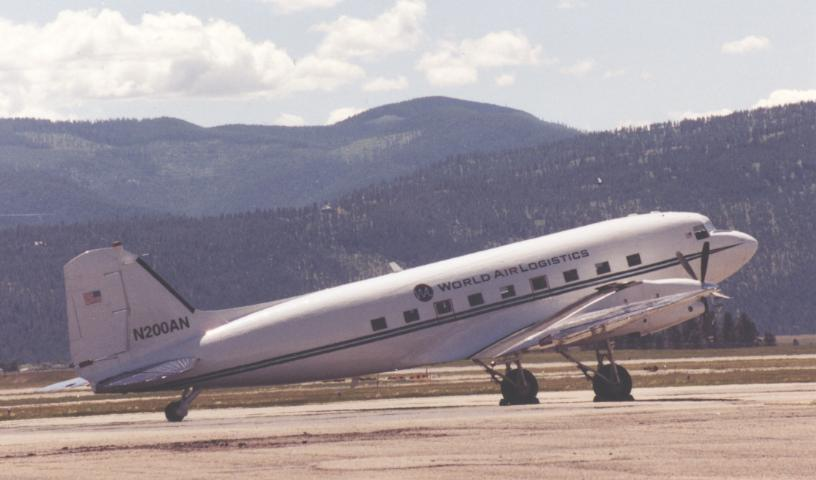
Basler BT-67 conversion No. 1, N200AN of World Air Logistics, at Missoula, Montana in 2000

=== Military ===
Argentina

- Argentine Air Force

Colombia

- Colombian Aerospace Force
- National Police of Colombia

El Salvador

- Salvadoran Air Force

Guatemala

- Guatemalan Air Force

Mali

- Malian Air Force

Mauritania

- Islamic Air Force of Mauritania

Thailand

- Royal Thai Air Force

=== Civilian ===
Australia

- Australian Antarctic Division
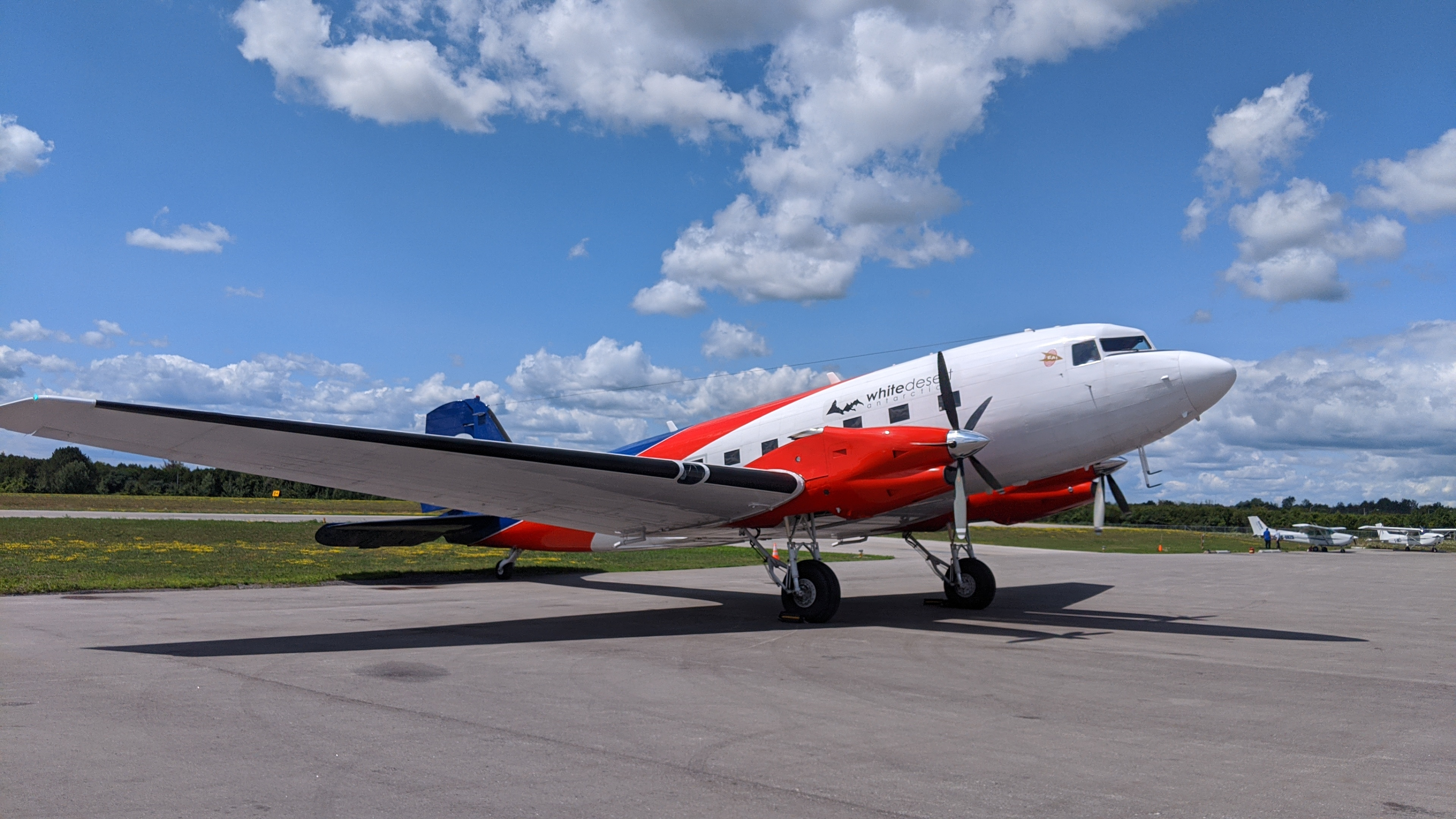
  A BT-67 operated by Enterprise Aviation Group at Oshawa Executive Airport

Canada

- ALCI Aviation
- North Star Air
- Kenn Borek Air

China

- Polar Research Institute of China

Germany

- Alfred Wegener Institute

United Kingdom

- Bell Geospace

United States

- United States Forest Service

== Accidents and incidents ==
As of 2019, a total of 15 BT-67 aircraft have been involved in crashes or other incidents since the 1990s.

== Specifications (BT-67) ==
Data from Born Again Basler and Jane's Civil and Military Aircraft Upgrades 1994–95

General characteristics

- Crew: Two (pilot & co-pilot)
- Capacity: 38 Passengers
- Length: 67 ft 9 in (20.65 m)
- Wingspan: 95 ft 0 in (28.95 m)
- Height: 16 ft 11 in (5.15 m)
- Empty weight: 15,700 lb (7,121 kg)
- Max takeoff weight: 28,750 lb (13,041 kg)
- Powerplant: 2 × Pratt & Whitney Canada PT6A-67R turboprop engines, 1,281 shp (955 kW) each
- Propellers: 5-bladed Hartzell constant speed propellers, 9 ft 7 in (2.92 m) diameter

Performance

- Maximum speed: 285 kn (328 mph, 528 km/h)
- Cruise speed: 210 kn (240 mph, 390 km/h)
- Range: 2,140 nmi (2,460 mi, 3,960 km) with 45 minute reserve and long-range fuel tank
- Service ceiling: 25,000 ft (7,600 m)

== See also ==
- That's All, Brother

Related development

- Douglas DC-3
- Conroy Turbo-Three, a similar turboprop DC-3 conversion.
- Conroy Tri-Turbo-Three, a tri-motor turboprop DC-3 conversion.

Related lists

- List of civil aircraft

=== Bibliography ===
- "Born Again Basler". Flight International. Vol. 139, no. 4264. 24–30 April 1991. pp. 40–43. Archived from the original on September 2, 2017.
- Hoyle, Craig (8–14 December 2015). "World Air Forces Directory". Flight International. Vol. 188, no. 5517. pp. 26–53. ISSN 0015-3710.
- Michell, Simon (1994). Jane's Civil and Military Upgrades 1994–95. Coulsdon, Surrey, UK: Jane's Information Group. ISBN 0-7106-1208-7.
- Rivas, Santiago (October 2015). "Fighting Colombia's Drug War". Air International. Vol. 89, no. 4. pp. 118–121. ISSN 0306-5634.
