= William Conroy (murderer) =

Last person executed at the Perth Gaol

William Conroy (1857 – 18 November 1887) was the last person executed at the Perth Gaol. Conroy was convicted of murdering Fremantle Town Councillor John Snook.

Conroy had immigrated from Ireland about ten years earlier, and before going to Fremantle was the licensee of the Victoria Hotel, located at the corner of James Street and Melbourne Road in Perth. On 6 September 1886 Conroy became the first publican of the new National Hotel on High Street in Fremantle.

On 23 June 1887 Conroy went to the Fremantle Town Hall where there was a children's ball in progress. He demanded entrance, as he was a licensee of the National Hotel, but was told by Snook that only ladies and children were to be admitted. He persisted in his demands and finally the door was slammed on him. Conroy later gained admittance to the Town Hall. When Snook left the supper room, Conroy followed him, drew a revolver from his pocket, shot Snook and put the gun back in his pocket. Conroy was arrested immediately. Snook died three months later. The trial took place at Perth and he was sentenced to death on 7 October 1887. After he was sentenced a petition was raised and signed by approximately 1500 people, including all members of the jury who had at the time of passing the verdict asked the judge to be lenient. This was then given to Governor Broome. A further call to the governor for clemency occurred during a public meeting attend by 1000 people at the Perth Town Hall. Governor Broome then reviewed the case with two judges and medical people who had previously been part of Conroy's trial, but the governor decided to let the law take it course. Conroy was hanged at Perth Gaol at 8 am on 18 November 1887. The execution however was not swift as when Conroy was hanged the initial fall failed to break his neck and it took approximately 15 minutes for him to die of strangulation. Conroy was buried at Fremantle Cemetery.
