= Conroy Aircraft =

American aircraft manufacturer

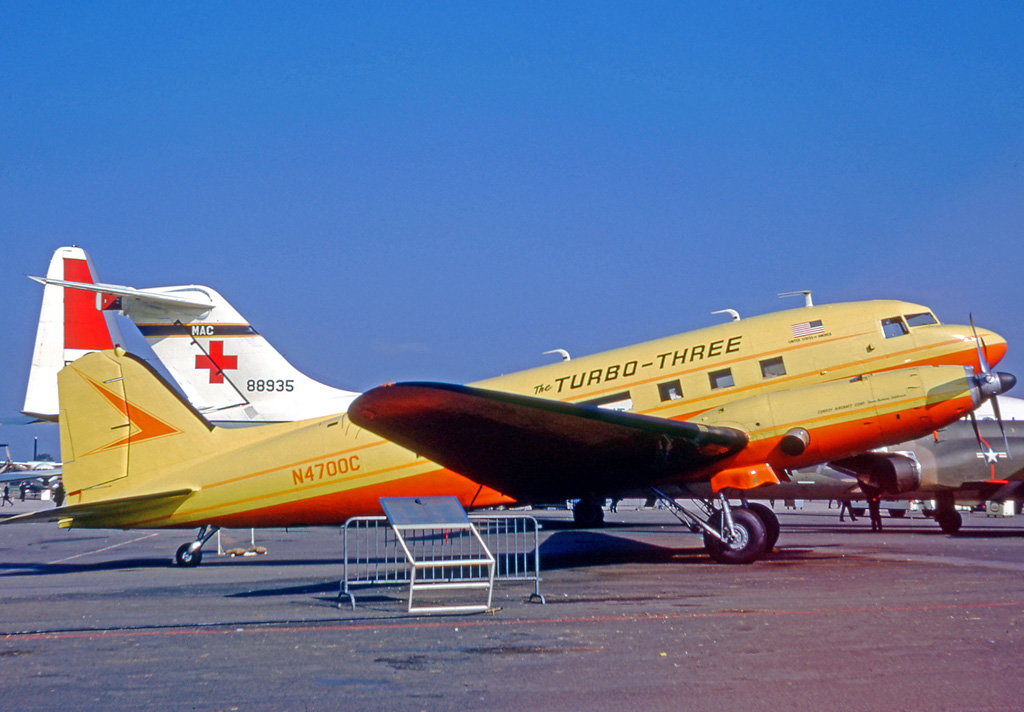
The Conroy Turbo Three in its original state fitted with two Rolls-Royce Darts when exhibited at the 1969 Paris Air Show

Conroy Aircraft was an American aircraft manufacturer founded by John M. Conroy in Goleta, California, in 1968 after he resigned as president of Aero Spacelines. The company imitated Aero Spacelines' success with its Guppy aircraft by converting a Canadair CL-44 to carry oversized cargo as the Conroy Skymonster.

Starting in 1969, the company converted several turboprop aircraft to haul specialty cargo: the Stolifter, based on the Cessna Skymaster; the Turbo Three and the Tri-Turbo-Three, based on the Douglas DC-3, and the Turbo Albatross, based on the Grumman Albatross.

The company was reorganized in 1972 as Specialized Aircraft, and moved to Camarillo Airport in Camarillo, California.

== Turbo-Three Corporation ==
Conroy formed the Turbo-Three Corp. to support his aircraft; Turbo-Three proposed the Conroy Virtus aircraft to NASA for use as a Space Shuttle carrier aircraft, but the design was not taken up. Turbo-Three Corporation ceased operations sometime around the death of Conroy and the FAA's decision in 1979 that the Tri Turbo-Three must be recertified, not certified under the standing DC-3 certification.
