= Conroy Turbo-Three =

Douglas DC-3 modified with turboprop engines

Turbo-Three
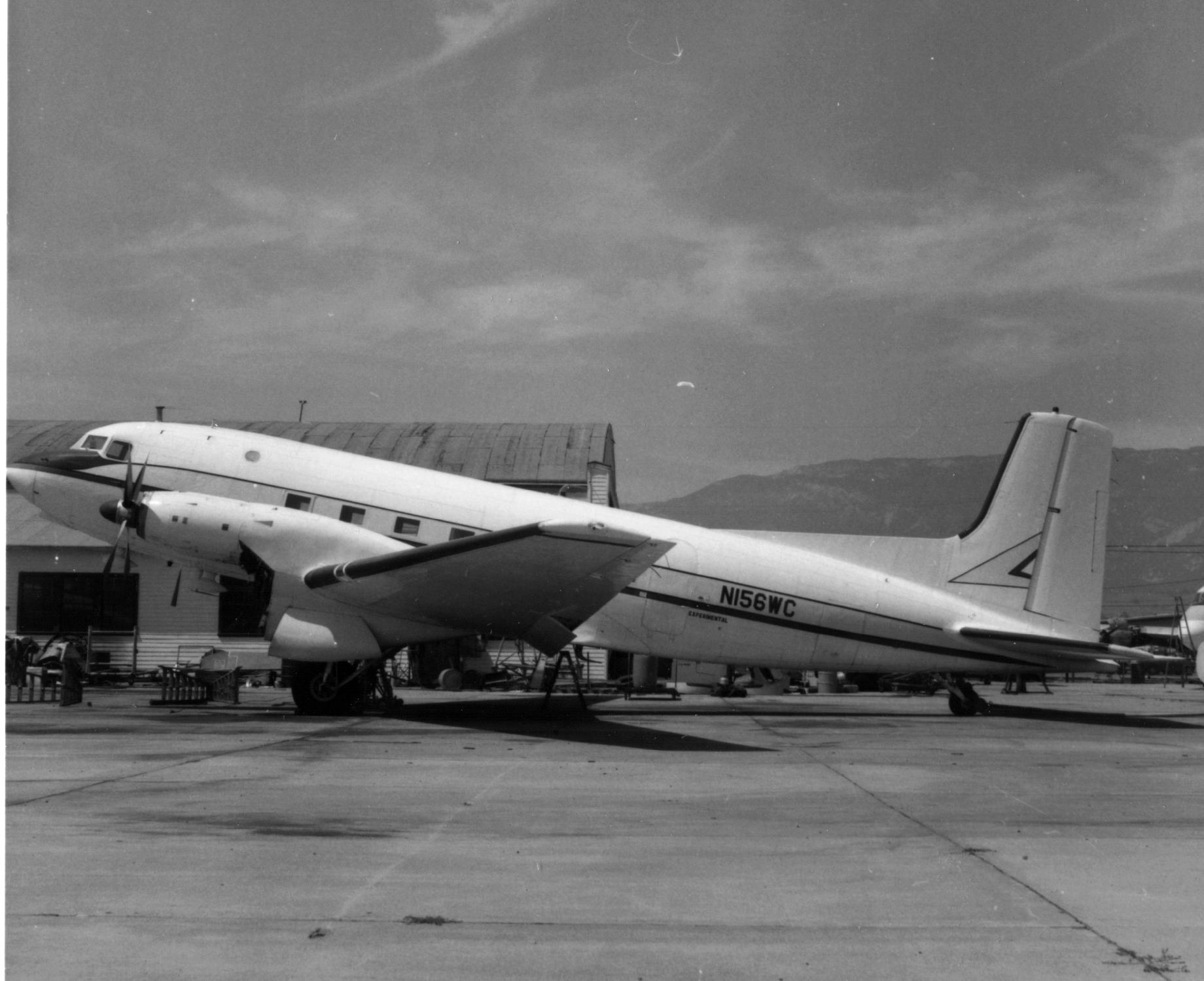
- Super Turbo-Three

General information
- Type: Airliner
- Manufacturer: Conroy Aircraft
- Number built: 2

History
- First flight: May 13, 1969
- Retired: February 24, 1984
- Developed from: Douglas DC-3
- Developed into: Conroy Tri-Turbo-Three

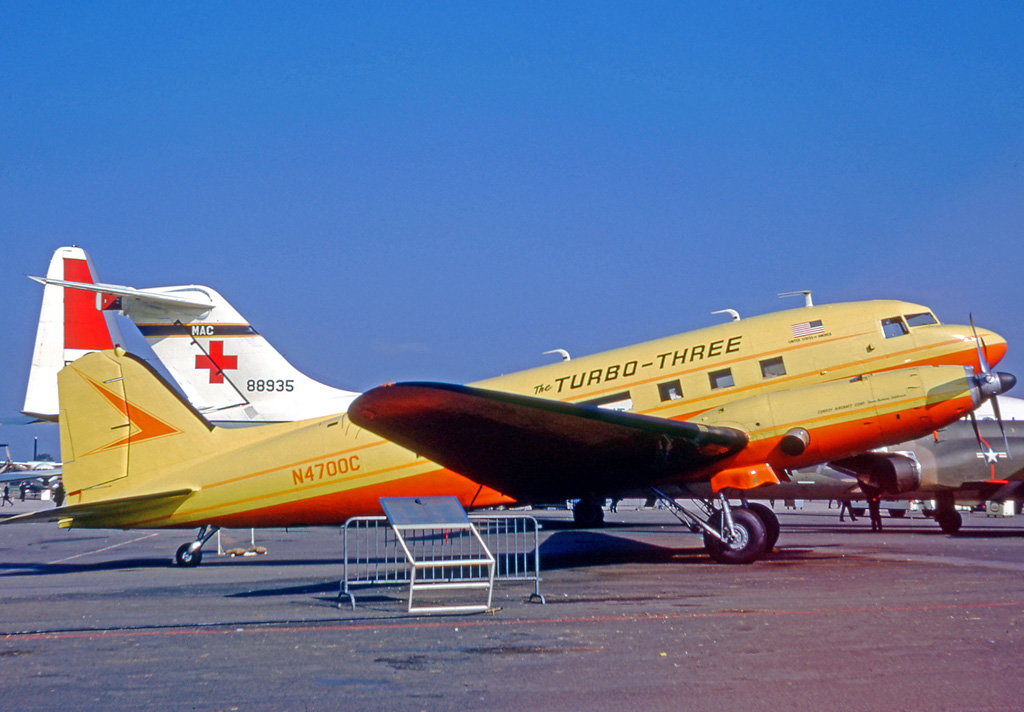
The first Turbo Three fitted with two Rolls-Royce Dart turboprops, displayed at the 1969 Paris Air Show

The Conroy Turbo-Three was a series of two Douglas DC-3s modified with turboprop engines by Conroy Aircraft. The first conversion first flew on May 13, 1969. Two Rolls-Royce Dart Mk. 510 engines from a crashed Vickers Viscount previously operated by United Airlines were used to replace the original Pratt & Whitney radial engines. Because the new turboprops were much lighter than the radial engines, they had to be mounted further forward to maintain the aircraft's center of gravity. The replacement engines increased the aircraft's cruising speed from 170 mph to 215 mph. The prototype was later converted into the Conroy Tri-Turbo-Three.

The second conversion was called the Super Turbo-Three because it was converted from a surplus Super DC-3. Unlike the first conversion, the Dart engines were mounted in the rear part of the engine nacelle. Due to the small diameter of the Viscount propellers, airflow was restricted by the bulky nacelles and landing gear fairings. This caused the takeoff distance to be 6000 feet, making it unappealing as a commuter aircraft. The aircraft ended up parked at Groton-New London Airport in Groton, Connecticut where on February 19, 1984 its cockpit was hit by a wing from a Transamerica Airlines Lockheed L-100 Hercules.

A similar conversion had been performed for British European Airways (BEA) in the 1940s when a Dakota was converted to Dart power in order to obtain turboprop experience prior to the introduction of the Viscount.

== See also ==
Related development

- Conroy Tri-Turbo-Three
- Douglas C-47 Skytrain
- Douglas DC-3

Aircraft of comparable role, configuration, and era

- Basler BT-67

Related lists

- List of aircraft of World War II
- List of civil aircraft
