= List of Philippine Airlines accidents and incidents =

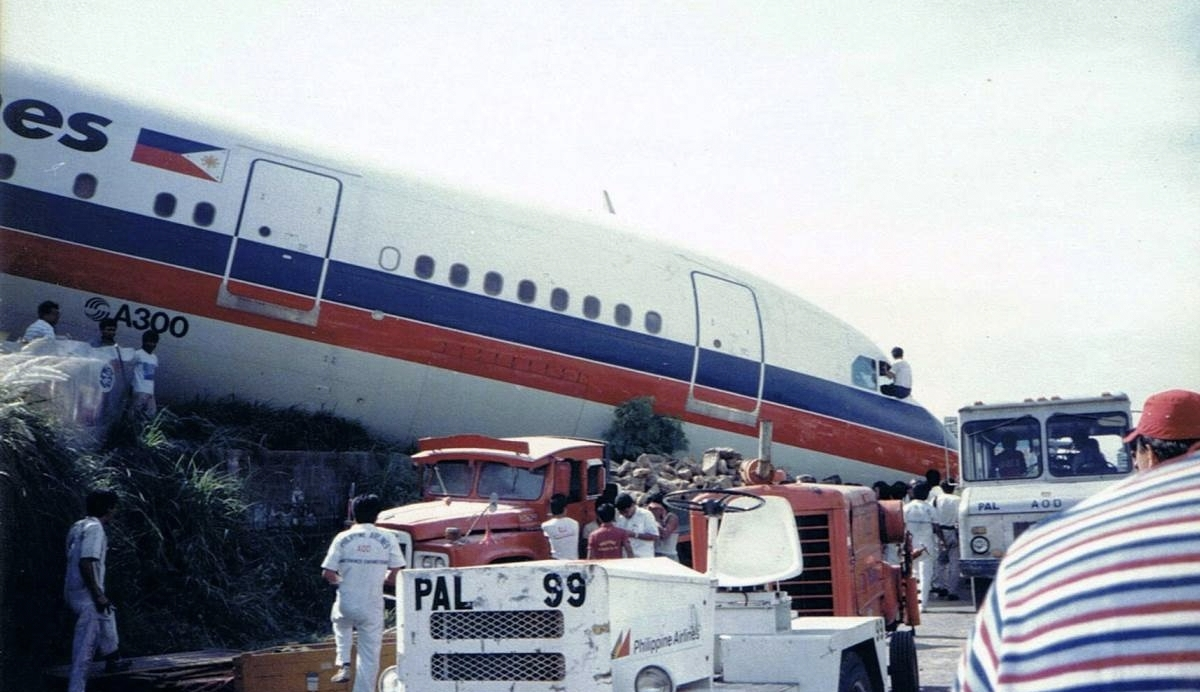
The aftermath of the Philippine Airlines Flight 502 runway overrun

Since its foundation in 1941, Philippine Airlines has suffered more than 20 aircraft crashes, terrorist attacks and aircraft hijackings. Most of these accidents and incidents involved propeller-driven aircraft, and prior to the 1980s.

== Accidents and incidents ==
Philippine Airlines Reported Incidents
Source: Philippine Airlines Accidents and Incidents, Aviation Safety Network.

Flight Designation	Date	Aircraft	Location	Description	Casualties
N/A	October 1, 1946	Douglas DC-3	Davao Airport	The aircraft belly landed in an isolated swamp when the pilot had lost his bearings.	Fatalities: 0
N/A (PI-C12)	January 25, 1947	Douglas C-47B Dakota IV	En route to Hong Kong-Kai Tak International Airport	Crashed into the 1,723 feet (525 m)-high Mount Parker at an altitude of 1,570 feet (480 m).	Fatalities: 4
N/A (PI-C11)	June 16, 1947	Douglas C-47	Near Cebu	Force-landed on the beach.	Fatalities: 0
N/A	December 26, 1947	Douglas C-47	Manila	A C-47 (PI-C36) and three DC-3s (PI-C3, PI-C10 and PI-C53) were written off following a typhoon.	Fatalities: Unknown
N/A (PI-C145)	January 21, 1948	Douglas DC-3	Mandurriao Airport	Wheels-up landing.	Fatalities: 0
N/A (PI-C45)	April 20, 1948	Douglas C-47	Jolo Airport	Crashed on landing.	Fatalities: 0
N/A (PI-C143)	May 17, 1948	Douglas DC-3	Cebu Airport	Stalled and crashed shortly after takeoff.	Fatalities: 0
N/A (PI-C291)	November 15, 1948	Douglas DC-6	Wake Island	Overran runway on landing.	Fatalities: 0
N/A (PI-C98)	May 7, 1949	Douglas C-47B	off Alabat Island	Crashed into the sea; a time bomb had been placed aboard the aircraft by two ex-convicts hired by a man and a woman to kill the woman's husband, who was a passenger.	Fatalities: 13
N/A (PI-C22)	January 24, 1950	Douglas DC-3	Between Iloilo and Manila	Disappeared during an Iloilo–Manila cargo service.	Fatalities: 4
N/A (PI-C2)	December 22, 1951	Douglas C-47A	Masbate Airport	The aircraft overshot the airstrip upon landing, ploughing across a highway and hit four houses.	Ground Fatalities: 1
N/A (PI-C5)	March 10, 1952	Douglas C-47A	Lahug Airport	Crashed shortly after takeoff after striking the top of a house.	Fatalities: 3
N/A (PI-C270)	March 30, 1952	Douglas C-47A	Loakan Airport	Crashed on takeoff.	Fatalities: 10
N/A (PI-C142)	October 15, 1953	Douglas C-47	Near Tuguegarao	The aircraft force-landed in a rice paddy; although the aircraft was repaired in 1954 and returned to service, it was lost in the crash of Flight S26.	Fatalities: 0
N/A (PI-C294)	January 14, 1954	Douglas DC-6	Rome	Crashed on approach to Ciampino Airport following an unexplained loss of control, probably due to turbulence.	Fatalities: 16
N/A (PI-C52)	June 21, 1957	de Havilland Canada DHC-3 Otter	Lagonglong Oriental Misamis	The pilot landed the aircraft on a highway at Lagonglong Oriental Misamis, after the engine had stopped, but had to swerve into a coconut grove to avoid people rushing at the aircraft. Both wings were sheared off and the Otter damaged beyond economical repair.	Fatalities: 0
N/A (PI-C770)	November 20, 1957	Vickers 784D Viscount	Manila International Airport	While on approach to Manila, the nose gear would not extend and the aircraft landed with the nose gear up. A trunnion had failed due to a manufacturing defect.	Fatalities: 0
N/A (PI-C55)	December 11, 1957	de Havilland Canada DHC-3 Otter	Labo Airport	Climbing through 75 feet (23 m) after takeoff, the aircraft suddenly turned left and descended, hit two trees and caught fire. The aircraft had been improperly loaded, with the center of gravity too far to the rear; weather conditions were also a factor.	Fatalities: 2
N/A (PI-C430)	January 12, 1960	Scottish Aviation Twin Pioneer 2	Plaridel Airport	Crashed following a training flight.	Fatalities: 0
N/A (PI-C12)	July 14, 1960	Douglas C-47A	En route to Cebu	Bad weather at the intended destination, Zamboanga, forced the crew of the PAL DC-3 to divert to Cebu. Fuel exhaustion then forced the crew to ditch their plane in shallow water, 40 yards off the Mindanao shore.	Fatalities: 0
Flight S26	November 23, 1960	Douglas DC-3C	Mount Baco	Struck Mount Baco en route to Manila due to a possible navigational error from poor weather conditions.	Fatalities: 33
Flight S85	December 22, 1960	Douglas C-47A	Cebu City	Crashed shortly after takeoff from Lahug Airport following failure of the number one engine.	Fatalities: 28
N/A (PI-C56)	July 27, 1962	de Havilland Canada DHC-3 Otter	Mutya	Crashed in a forest some 40 mi south of its planned course. The passenger was reportedly a suspected criminal wanted on several charges.	Fatalities: 2
N/A (PI-C503)	October 12, 1962	Fokker F27-100	Manila International Airport	The F-27 crashed shortly after takeoff during a crew training flight. The crew probably shut down the wrong engine during an engine failure drill.	Fatalities: 3
N/A (PI-C485)	October 23, 1962	Douglas DC-3	Lumbia Airport	Crashed and caught fire on landing.	Fatalities: 0
Flight 984	March 2, 1963	Douglas C-47B	Davao City	Struck Mount Boca at 3000 feet due to navigation errors.	Fatalities: 27
Flight 946	February 21, 1964	Douglas C-47B	Marawi City	Crashed due to pilot error upon landing approach.	Fatalities: 31
Flight F26	May 20, 1964	de Havilland Canada DHC-3 Otter	En route from Siocon to Zamboanga	The pilot continued to fly VFR into unfavourable weather over the jagged shoreline with practically zero visibility due to heavy rain. There was a heavy squall at the time and at the scene of the accident. Weather conditions in the Western Mindanao area during the day of the accident were generally unfavourable for VFR flights. When the pilot took off from Siocon the ceiling at the destination, Zamboanga, was below IFR minima.	Fatalities: 11
Flight 741	October 29, 1965	Douglas C-47A	Near Manila	Struck a tree and crashed shortly after takeoff. The pilot had not set the rudder trim tab to its proper position before takeoff and during flight; the aircraft was also overloaded.	Fatalities: 1
Flight 785	June 29, 1966	Douglas C-47A	Sablayan	Crashed due to crew error, severe turbulence and strong gusty winds.	Fatalities: 26
Flight 345	February 28, 1967	Fokker F27-100	Cebu City	Crashed at Mactan–Cebu International Airport during landing due to an aft center-of-gravity condition resulting from improper loading.	Fatalities: 12
Flight 385	July 6, 1967	Fokker F27-100	Bacolod	Crashed into a mountain.	Fatalities: 21
N/A	August 5, 1969	HS 748-209 Srs. 2	Near Zamboanga	A passenger set off an explosive device, probably gelignite, in the lavatory blowing himself out of the plane. The HS-748 landed safely.	Fatalities: 1
Flight 158	September 12, 1969	BAC One-Eleven 402AP	Antipolo	Crashed short on a hill upon landing approach.	Fatalities: 45
Flight 215	April 21, 1970	HS 748-209 Srs. 2	Manila	Crashed near Cabanatuan after a bomb exploded in the rear lavatory.	Fatalities: 36
N/A (PI-C532)	May 9, 1970	Fokker F27-100	Maria Cristina Airport	Control was lost on take-off from runway 02 in almost zero visibility. The F-27 ran off the runway and rolled over stockpiles of sand and crossed the shoulder. The left wingtip struck a stockpile of rocks, causing the aircraft to cartwheel.	Fatalities: 1
N/A	June 2, 1970	Fokker F27-100	Near Roxas City	A hand grenade exploded inside the passenger cabin at an altitude of 13,000 feet (4,000 m). A safe emergency landing was carried out at Roxas Airport with a 9 sq ft (0.84 m^{2}) hole in the fuselage.	Fatalities: 1
N/A (PI-C504)	July 1, 1970	Fokker F27-200	Dumaguete Airport	The F-27 overran the runway. Undercarriage and right wing were severely damaged.	Fatalities: 0
N/A	November 19, 1970	Douglas C-47	Manila	Two C-47s (PI-C9 and PI-C15) were destroyed by a typhoon.	Fatalities: 0
Flight 463	November 28, 1972	HS 748-232 Srs.2	Bislig	Bounced and swerved on landing. The nose gear, wings and propellers were severely damaged.	Fatalities: 0
N/A (RP-C1028)	February 3, 1975	HS 748-222 Srs.2	Manila	Crashed at Nichols Field after a fire developed in the number two engine shortly after takeoff. It was also due to crew error in their inability to deal with a standard emergency.	Fatalities: 33
N/A (RP-C1029)	May 10, 1975	HS 748-222 Srs.2	Manila International Airport	Tire burst during retraction.	Fatalities: 0
N/A (RP-C1184)	June 3, 1975	BAC One-Eleven 524FF	Near Manila	During descent into Manila (at FL200) a bomb exploded in the right lavatory in the rear of the plane. The explosion caused a hole in the fuselage of 1.3 m x 4 m. A successful emergency landing was made.	Fatalities: 1
Flight 421	April 18, 1977	Douglas DC-8-53	Tokyo, Japan	The aircraft, a Douglas DC-8-53 nicknamed "Champaca" (RP-C803), was written off after a landing accident at Haneda Airport.	None
N/A (RP-C1419)	July 17, 1977	NAMC YS-11A-301	Mactan Island	The no. 1 engine ran down and temperature rose to 850 degrees Celsius. The aircraft, on base leg for an approach to Mactan, lost height and ditched. The airplane sank in 17 feet (5.2 m) of water.	Fatalities: 0
N/A (RP-C1184)	August 17, 1978	BAC One-Eleven 524FF	En route from Cebu to Manila	An explosion in the rear left lavatory blew a hole in the fuselage. The aircraft was flying at FL240 at the time, on its way from Cebu to Manila.	Fatalities: 1
Flight 480	July 11, 1982	HS 748-209 Srs.2	Jolo Airport	The take-off was aborted at V1 when the pilots heard two unusual sounds from the no. 1 engine. The aircraft overran and came to rest against a wall and some vehicles.	Fatalities: 1
N/A (RP-C1182)	August 4, 1984	BAC 1-11-527FK	Tacloban Airport	Overshot runway 36 by 100 feet (30 m) and ended up in the sea.	Fatalities: 0
Unknown	January 12, 1987	McDonnell Douglas DC-10-30	Manila International Airport	A Philippine Airlines McDonnell Douglas DC-10 burst a tire while taking off from Manila bound for Sydney. The cockpit crew elected to proceed with the flight and safely landed the aircraft in Sydney Airport.	Fatalities: 0
Flight 206	June 26, 1987	HS 748-209 Srs. 2	Itogon, Benguet	Struck Mount Ugu, fifteen kilometers south of Loakan Airport in Baguio, due to poor visibility.	Fatalities: 50
Flight 502	September 19, 1987	Airbus A300B4-203	Manila International Airport	An Airbus A300B4, registration serial RP-C3003, was arriving from Singapore Changi Airport when it suffered a runway excursion after landing on runway 06 at Manila International Airport. The aircraft struck the airport perimeter wall, causing the nose undercarriage to collapse rearwards.	Fatalities: 0
Flight 443	December 13, 1987	Short 360-330	Iligan City	Crashed near Maria Cristina Airport.	Fatalities: 15
Flight 124	July 21, 1989	BAC One-Eleven 516FP	Manila	Crashed at Ninoy Aquino International Airport when the aircraft overran the runway while landing, impacting several vehicles on an adjacent roadway.	Ground Fatalities: 8
Flight 143	May 11, 1990	Boeing 737-3Y0	Manila	EI-BZG suffered an explosion in the center fuel tank near the terminal of Ninoy Aquino International Airport while preparing for takeoff. The fire and smoke engulfed the aircraft before it could be completely evacuated. The explosion was similar to what happened to the ill-fated TWA Flight 800 six years later.	Fatalities: 8
Unknown	July 19, 1991	Boeing 747-200	Ninoy Aquino International Airport	A Philippine Airlines Boeing 747-200 arriving from Honolulu ran off the runway while landing under heavy rain. The aircraft was safely evacuated with no injuries among the 285 passengers and 16 crew.	Fatalities: 0
Flight 434	December 11, 1994	Boeing 747-283BM	Minami Daito, Okinawa, Japan	A small bomb exploded underneath the seat (seat 26K) of Japanese businessman Haruki Ikegami. Ikegami died due to injuries sustained in the explosion, the only fatality on board. The aircraft landed safely. Investigators later found that Ramzi Yousef planted the bomb there to test it out for a terrorist attack he was planning, Project Bojinka. The plan was foiled after an apartment fire in Manila led investigators to the laptop computer and disks containing the plan.	Fatalities: 1
Flight 137	March 22, 1998	Airbus A320-214	Bacolod	The aircraft overran the runway of Bacolod City Domestic Airport and crashed, plowing through homes near its end.	Ground Fatalities: 3
Flight 475	October 26, 2007	Airbus A320-214	Butuan	The aircraft, with 148 passengers on board, overshot the runway of Bancasi Airport.	Injuries: 19
Flight 512	October 7, 2013	Airbus A330-301	Ninoy Aquino Intl' Airport	Flight PR512, an Airbus A330-301, departed Singapore-Changi International Airport at 20:13 hours local time, with destination Manila, Philippines. On board were 11 crew members and 203 passengers. The aircraft landed at Manila about 23:00 following an uneventful flight. The aircraft parked at Bay 43 of Terminal 2 at 23:05 hours. The doors were opened and the flight crew allowed passengers to deplane and cargo to be offloaded. At about 23:25 when the checklist for securing and parking the aircraft was completed, the Electronic Centralized Aircraft Monitor (ECAM) warning indicated smoke in the aft cargo hold. Then, the rear cabin crew heard crackling sounds and later noticed smoke coming from the rear of the cabin. One of the rear cabin crew rushed to the cockpit and personally relayed to the captain that there was smoke in the rear of the cabin. At this point, the captain with the FO went out of the cockpit and verified the smoke. The captain went back to the cockpit alone, and discharged the fire extinguishing bottles for the aft cargo compartment and then went out of cockpit. After a while, upon remembering that the battery was already off, the captain returned to the cockpit, put on the battery and repeated the firing of the fire extinguishing bottles for the aft cargo compartment. After this, at about 23:55 the captain departed the aircraft since the cause and source of the smoke was undetermined. When the aft cargo door was opened, thick smoke and hot air started pushing out. The cargo loader immediately moved away from the aft cargo door and returned to close the door. Fire services attended to suppress the fire and smoke. Then the cargo loaders unloaded the Unit Loading Devices (ULDs) that were affected by fire. Initial investigation conducted showed that out of the six ULDs in the aft cargo compartment for baggage and cargo, four were affected by the fire. The aft cargo compartment showed substantial damage by fire.	Injuries: 0
Flight 115	July 7, 2017	Airbus A340-300	San Francisco Intl' Airport	Air Canada Flight 759 mistakenly attempted a landing on a SFO taxiway on July 7. A new NTSB report indicates that the plane was as low as 60 feet when it passed over Philippine Airlines Flight 115 - possibly as close as five feet away from the plane's tail fin. Three United planes are also involved in the incident.	Injuries: 0
Flight 117	September 24, 2018	Airbus A340-313	Vancouver International Airport	An Airbus A340-300 aircraft operated by Philippines Airlines, was conducting Flight 117 from Vancouver International Airport, Canada to Ninoy Aquino International Airport, Manila, Philippines. As the aircraft was accelerating for take off on runway 08R at Vancouver, the air traffic tower controller heard a loud boom. The runway was closed for inspection, and tire and other debris were found on the runway. Runway 08R was closed for 15 minutes to clean it up; a few departures and arrivals were delayed. Flight 117 continued its flight to Manila without further incident. Following the landing at Manila, several holes in the skin were found in the landing gear area. The aircraft received substantial damage to the belly, as well as the Center Landing Gear (CLG) fairing door.	Injuries: 0
RP C8612	July 7, 2026	Airbus A320	Ninoy Aquino International Airport	A parked PAL Airbus 320 was hit at the tail section by Saudi Flight SV871 (Boeing 787) while taxiing for departure. The Saudia aircraft also sustained damage on its wingtip.	Injuries: 0

== Hijackings and near misses ==
- On December 30, 1952, after takeoff from Laoag International Airport, an armed man forced his way into the cockpit. He pulled out a .45-caliber pistol and demanded that the plane be brought to Xiamen, in mainland China. The captain took over control from the co-pilot and put the plane into a steep dive. The hijacker did not lose his balance, and shot and killed the captain, forcing the co-pilot to retake control. A flight attendant had come up to the cockpit to find out what was going on; as he knocked, the hijacker shot him twice through the cockpit door, killing him. The co-pilot changed course to China and continued at 6,000 feet (1,800 m) over the China Sea until two Chinese Nationalists T-6 Harvard planes showed up. Both planes chased the DC-3 and sprayed machine gun fire. The pilot managed to escape until he met with other Nationalist planes, who forced the flight to land at Quemoy. At Quemoy the hijacker was arrested.
- On November 6, 1968, four men hijacked Philippine Airlines Flight 158A, a Fokker F27, just before its descent to Manila. After taking over the aircraft, the hijackers proceeded through the cabin, demanding money and valuables from the passengers. A federal policeman drew his firearm and opened fire, beginning a firefight. One bullet went through a window and other bullets hit the cabin wall. One passenger was shot in the crossfire and died. The aircraft landed safely at Manila and taxied to a remote area of the airport. The hijackers took the pilot and two other crew members hostage before releasing them at the airport fence, after which the hijackers got away in a car.
- On March 30, 1971, six hijackers hijacked a Philippines Airlines BAC One-Eleven en route to Davao City and ordered the pilot to divert the plane to Guangzhou, China. En route, the pilot requested for a refueling stop in Hong Kong where 20 passengers where freed. The plane proceeded to Guangzhou where the hijackers disembarked and requested asylum. The rest of the passengers where freed by Chinese authorities and the aircraft returned to Manila the following day.
- On October 11, 1973, three men opposed to the Marcos regime hijacked a Philippine Airlines BAC One-Eleven and demanded to be flown to Hong Kong. A refueling stop was made at Manila, where all 48 passengers were released in exchange for Philippine Air Lines president Benigno Toda Jr. The aircraft continued to Hong Kong where the hijackers surrendered.
- On February 25, 1975, two men, armed with a homemade gun, two hand grenades and an Armalite rifle, hijacked a Philippine Airlines Douglas DC-3A (RP-C941) and ordered the pilot to fly to Cebu City, where 12 passengers were released. The aircraft continued to Manila, where the remaining 13 passengers and three crew were released after three hours of negotiations. One hijacker claimed that he was convicted on false evidence and that the trial judge was biased. President Marcos intervened with an offer of "conditional pardon" and both hijackers surrendered.
- On October 7, 1975, one hijacker on a Philippine Airlines BAC One-Eleven bound from Davao to Manila demanded to be taken to Libya. He surrendered.
- On April 7, 1976, a BAC One-Eleven was hijacked by three men and demanded USD $300,000 and the release of numerous political prisoners. At Manila, the hijackers exchanged all the passengers for another set of hostages and USD $300,000 in cash. During the next six days, the hijackers flew to Kota Kinbalu and Kuala Lumpur, Malaysia and then to Bangkok, Thailand. At Bangkok the airline supplied a Douglas DC-8. The hijackers along with 12 PAL staff members continued to Karachi, Pakistan and finally to Benghazi, Libya. At Benghazi the hijackers released the remaining hostages and requested political asylum.
- On May 21, 1976, Philippine Airlines Flight 116, a BAC One-Eleven en route from Davao to Manila, was hijacked by six rebels, demanding $375,000 and a plane to fly them to Libya. Negotiations between the police and the hijackers lasted for 2 days until May 23, when authorities stormed the plane. A gun battle ensued and lasted for hours. The hijackers subsequently detonated a hand grenade in the cabin, which burned the aircraft and killed 10 passengers and 3 hijackers. The remaining three hijackers were caught and were executed by a firing squad.
- On July 12, 1980, waiting until a crewmember opened the door, the hijacker entered the cockpit of the Boeing 727 shortly after takeoff and stated he had two confederates aboard who had a bomb. He demanded USD $6 million and demanded to be flown to Libya. He agreed to release all but 10 American passengers. Actually there were no Americans aboard. He demanded that the other passengers be notified that there was a bomb aboard. The hijacker was told that such an announcement could not be made from the cockpit. When the hijacker left the cockpit to call a flight attendant the crew locked the cockpit door. The aircraft then returned to Manila where Philippine security personnel boarded and took the hijacker into custody.
- On May 21, 1982, a man with a hand grenade, demanding better conditions for sugar workers and coconut farmers, held 109 people hostage aboard a Philippine Airlines jet bound from Bacolod to Cebu. The plane was on the ground at Cebu. The unidentified hijacker also demanded pay raises for teachers and back pay for veterans.
- On May 25, 2000, Philippine Airlines Flight 812, en route from Davao to Manila, was hijacked by a man with marital problems. The hijacker was pushed out of the aircraft before arrival by a flight attendant and used a homemade parachute in escaping, with none of the other passengers and crew being injured or killed.
