= Philippine Air Lines Flight 984 =

1963 aviation incident in the Philippines

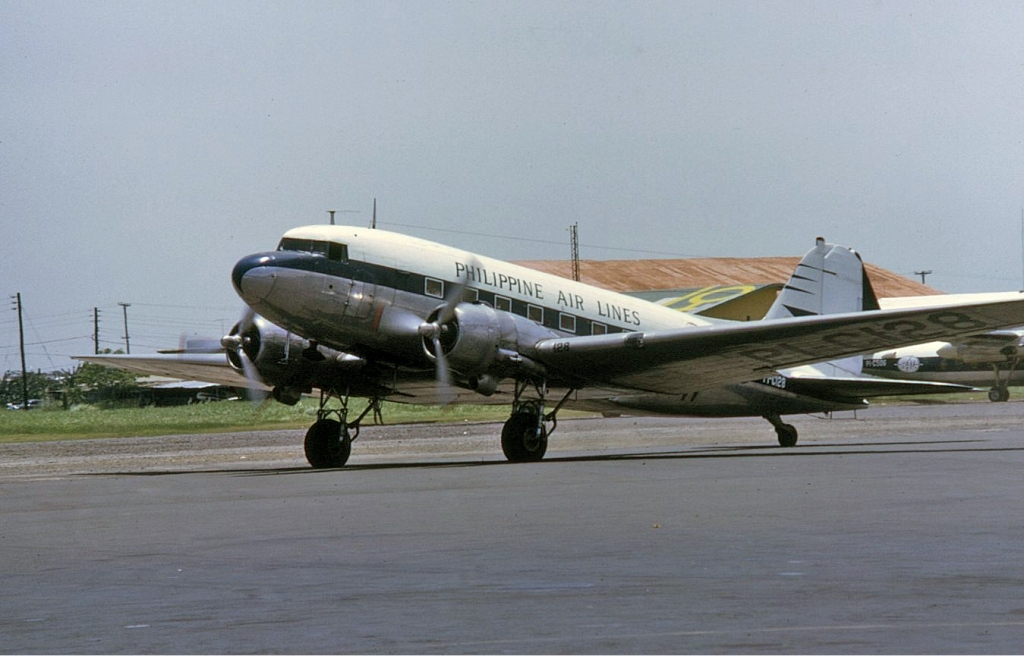
- A Philippine Air Lines DC-3 similar to the accident aircraft

Accident
- Date: March 2, 1963
- Summary: Controlled flight into terrain in bad weather
- Site: Mount Boca, near sitio Kiniledan, 50 mi (80 km) from Davao, Philippines

Aircraft
- Aircraft type: Douglas C-47B
- Operator: Philippine Air Lines
- Registration: PI-C489
- Flight origin: Zamboanga International Airport, Zamboanga, Philippines
- Stopover: Cotabato Airport, Cotabato, Philippines
- Destination: Francisco Bangoy International Airport, Davao, Philippines
- Passengers: 24
- Crew: 3
- Fatalities: 27
- Survivors: 0

Philippine Air Lines Flight 984 was a scheduled domestic flight operated by Philippine Air Lines that crashed en route to Francisco Bangoy International Airport, Davao City, Philippines.

On March 2, 1963, the Douglas C-47B was flying in overcast weather en route to Davao when it crashed on the slopes of Mount Boca, near sitio Kiniledan, reportedly about 50 miles (80 km) from Davao, on the second leg of a Zamboanga-Cotabato-Davao route that originated from Zamboanga. Everyone on board was killed upon impact.

== Aircraft and crew ==
The aircraft was a Douglas C-47B (c/n 32863) manufactured in Oklahoma, United States around 1945. It was assigned to the United States Air Force before being transferred to the Royal Air Force, and then finally delivered to Philippine Air Lines.

The aircraft's maintenance history and records showed nothing of an unusual nature, and there were no reports of malfunction while the aircraft was stationed at Cotabato. It was testified that at the time of takeoff, the aircraft was still airworthy and its gross weight and centre of gravity were within allowable limits.

=== Crew ===
The captain held an airline pilot's license rated for the DC-3, with his last proficiency check being in February 1962. He had flown the same route for nine years, some being on DC-3 and DHC-3 Otter aircraft, so he was familiar with the prevailing weather conditions and flight path. He had amassed 10,320 flight hours, and his medical certificate showed no waivers.

The co-pilot held a commercial pilot's license rated for the DC-3, and flew a total of 870 hours. His medical certificate showed no waivers.

== Crash ==
Flight 984 departed Cotabato at 09:40 PHT and was estimated to arrive at Davao by 10:25. At 10:02, the crew reported to the radio station at Cotabato that they were halfway to Davao at 6,000 feet (1,800 m), and was beginning to descend.

Later on, it contacted the radio station at Davao asking for the weather conditions present in the area. After having received the weather information the flight was advised that its arrival would be delayed due to bad weather. There was no report concerning a malfunction with the aircraft and this would end up to be the final radio transmission from the aircraft.

When Flight 984 failed to arrive at Davao, a search was conducted, where the wreckage was subsequently found on Mount Boca, about 50 miles from Davao Airport, at an altitude of 3,000 feet (910 m). It was estimated the aircraft crashed at around 11:30.

== Wreckage ==
The aircraft was on a heading of 030° approaching the Digos shoreline when it struck tree tops, separating both wings until the aircraft came to rest upside down after hitting a tree about 3 meters (9.8 ft) in diameter. The landing gear was extended and the engines were developing power. No fire took place, and everyone on board was killed on impact.

== Investigation and cause ==
The weather on the flight path was not formally available for the pilots as this was the first flight of the day on the Cotabato-Davao segment, so they had to rely on the weather reports of other pilots. The PAL radio operator at Davao had reported a visibility of 1–2 miles (1.6–3.2 km), 500–1,000 feet (150–300 m) in overcast and wind speeds of 5–8 knots (9.3–14.8 km/h; 5.8–9.2 mph).

The Philippine Aircraft Accident Investigation Board investigated the crash. The probable flight path was reconstructed, and it was believed that the aircraft may had drifted inland due to eastern winds at about 10 knots (19 km/h; 12 mph). When the pilot asked for weather at Davao, he may had believed he was over the Digos shoreline, but instead he was 3 miles (4.8 km) off course in poor visibility and was approximately 5 miles (8.0 km) inland of Digos when he started his descent. The Board believed that the pilot was too confident of his position and flight experience that he did not take into account the crosswinds that drifted the aircraft off course.

Therefore, the probable cause was determined to be a navigational error, en-route and during descent, with contributing factors being the limited visibility and crosswind in the final stages of the flight.
