= Airtech Canada =

Canadian aerospace engineering firm

Airtech Canada is a Canadian aerospace engineering firm established at the Peterborough Airport, Ontario in 1977. The company specializes in the design, engineering, assembly, manufacture, modification, repair, and marketing of aircraft and aviation products. It has also marketed conversions for popular radial-engined transport aircraft such as the Douglas DC-3, de Havilland Canada DHC-2 Beaver and de Havilland Canada DHC-3 Otter.

One of Airtech Canada's significant contributions is the DHC-3/1000 Otter conversion, which replaces the original Pratt & Whitney R-1340 radial engine with a 1,000 hp Polish-manufactured PZL ASz-62IR radial engine. The conversion is certified in Canada and the United States and is utilized in various configurations, including wheel, ski, and floatplane setups.
