= Maria Cristina Airport =

Airport in Lanao del Norte, Philippines

Maria Cristina Airport Tugpahanan sa Maria Cristina Landing a Maria Cristina Paliparan ng Maria Cristina
- IATA: IGN; ICAO: RPMI

Summary
- Airport type: Public
- Operator: Civil Aviation Authority of the Philippines
- Serves: Iligan
- Location: Barangay Maria Cristina, Balo-i, Lanao del Norte, Lanao del Norte
- Elevation AMSL: 396 m / 1,300 ft
- Coordinates: 08°07′49.89″N 124°12′53.62″E
- Interactive map of Maria Cristina Airport

Runways
Direction	Length		Surface
Direction	m	ft	Surface
02/20	1,400	4,593	Concrete

Maria Cristina Airport (Note: Cebuano: Tugpahanan sa Maria Cristina, Maranao: Landing a Maria Cristina, Filipino: Paliparan ng Maria Cristina) (IATA: IGN, ICAO: RPMI), also known as Iligan Airport, is an airport serving the general area of Iligan, located in the province of Lanao del Norte in the Philippines. It is the only airport in the province. The airport is classified as a secondary airport, or a minor commercial domestic airport, by the Civil Aviation Authority of the Philippines.

Located some 1,300 feet or 396 meters above sea level, Maria Cristina Airport has the distinction of being the highest airport in Mindanao and the second-highest in the Philippines, next to Loakan Airport in Baguio.

The airport takes its name from its location, Barangay Maria Cristina in the neighboring municipality of Balo-i. However, the airport can also be named after one of Iligan's most famous attractions, Maria Cristina Falls.

With the construction of Laguindingan Airport in Misamis Oriental, designed to serve the Cagayan de Oro-Iligan corridor, this airport was replaced by the new airport along with Lumbia Airport in Cagayan de Oro.

The Laguindingan Airport located in Laguindingan, Misamis Oriental opened in 2013. It is expected to augment the city's need for a nearby airport as the new airport is only 65 kilometers away or at most 35 to 40 minutes away from Iligan. The new airport is a flagship project of the Mindanao Super Regions project as a major project of the Cagayan de Oro-Iligan Corridor (CIC).

== Accidents and incidents ==
- Philippine Airlines Flight 443 was on approach to Iligan Airport on December 13, 1987, when it crashed into nearby Mt. Gurain. All 15 passengers and crew on board were killed.

== See also ==
- List of airports in the Philippines
