= Philippine Air Lines Flight S85 =

Philippine air accident flight

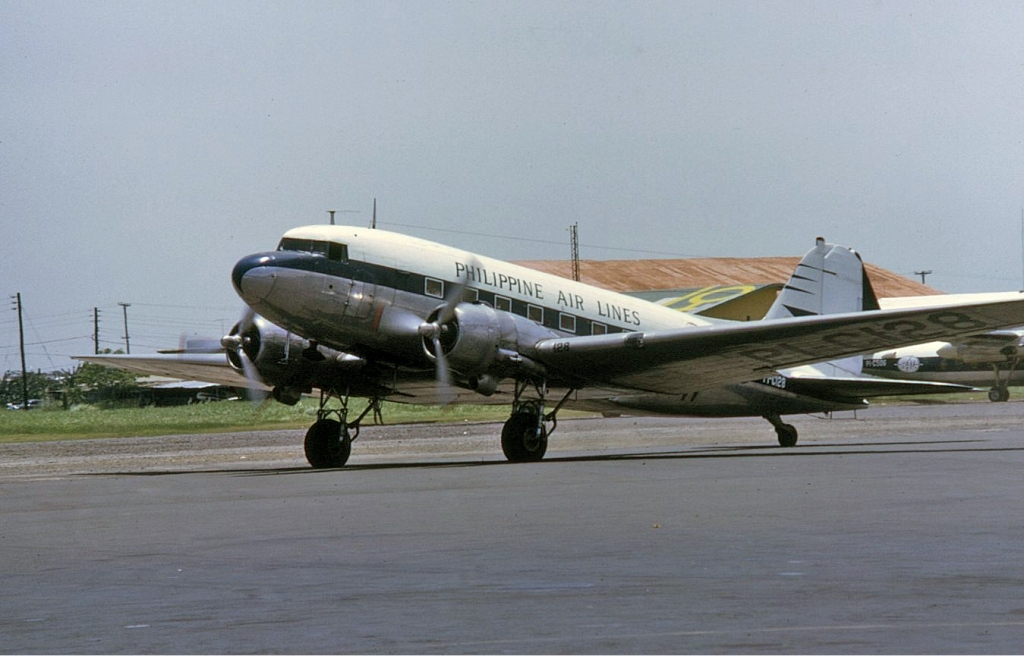
- A Philippine Air Lines DC-3 similar to the accident aircraft

Accident
- Date: December 22, 1960
- Summary: Stall and loss of control following engine failure on takeoff
- Site: Talamban, Cebu, 2.5 miles from runway 03, near Lahug Airport, Philippines

Aircraft
- Aircraft type: Douglas DC-3C
- Operator: Philippine Air Lines
- Registration: PI-C126
- Flight origin: Cebu Lahug Airport, Cebu, Philippines
- Destination: Francisco Bangoy International Airport, Davao, Philippines
- Passengers: 34
- Crew: 3
- Fatalities: 28
- Injuries: 9
- Survivors: 9

Philippine Air Lines Flight S85 was a domestic flight that crashed shortly after taking off from Cebu-Lahug Airport, Cebu.

On December 22, 1960, the aircraft's left engine malfunctioned shortly after takeoff, prompting an emergency landing, however before the aircraft could return to the runway, it stalled, banked left and crashed in a huge explosion about 2.5 miles from Lahug Airport, killing 26 passengers including both pilots.

== Aircraft and crew ==
The aircraft was a Douglas C-47A manufactured in the United States in June 1944 and registered as 43–16127, before it was given to Philippine Air Lines and converted into a DC-3C 40-seater and re-registered as PI-C126 in 1948.

It had 18,611 flight hours at the time of the crash, and there was no evidence that the aircraft was not airworthy before the flight.

The left engine had a total operating time of over 12,300 hours, and was last overhauled on June 7, 1960, while the right engine had a total operating time of over 5,000 hours, and was last overhauled on February 5, 1960.

The crew of three consisted of a captain, a first officer and a steward.

The captain held an airline pilot's license and logged 8,564 hours. He had flown the S-85 flight route 16 times. The first officer held a commercial pilot's license and a flight instructor's license, and logged 1,822 hours. He had flown the S-85 flight route 35 times.

The steward, who survived the crash, stated after the crash that the first officer occupied the left seat and the captain occupying the right, something that wasn't authorised by the airline.

== Background ==
Flight S85 originated from Manila at 00:10 PHT and arrived at Cebu at 02:40. The captain who flew this segment of the trip reported nothing unusual with the aircraft's engine and instruments.

A visual inspection was conducted by the PAL maintenance inspector followed by a further inspection by the first officer upon arrival at Lahug Airport. It was checked and refuelled ready for the next segment to Davao.

No maintenance work was done at Cebu prior to takeoff. All scheduled inspections and maintenance were done in accordance with the airline's procedures.

== Accident ==
Following a crew changeover, Flight S85 took off from Cebu at 03:30 PHT, and was estimated to arrive at Davao around 2 hours later. The controller-on-duty at Lahug reported that the aircraft's take-off appeared to be normal. However, a radio call was received that the left engine had malfunctioned shortly after it left the runway. An emergency landing was granted and while the aircraft attempted to turn back to the airport, the plane failed to gain altitude, and so it stalled, banked left and crashed in a huge explosion 2.5 miles from the runway threshold, in Talamban.

Both pilots and 26 passengers died in the crash, though the steward and 8 other passengers survived.

== Cause ==
Investigations determined that Flight S85 crashed due to the malfunction of the left engine which led to the crash, and contributing factors involved the darkness of the night which limited the visibility during the emergency and the inappropriate emergency procedures that were carried out.

There was no material failure of the propellers to indicate a runaway propeller in its assembly. However it was noted that while all three blades on the right propeller were symmetrically bent, the left propellers appeared unsymmetrical, with one blade showing an oblique scratch at the tip. Based on the findings of the left propeller blades, it was suggested that the left engine had feathered itself.
