= Philippine Air Lines Flight 741 =

1965 aviation incident in the Philippines

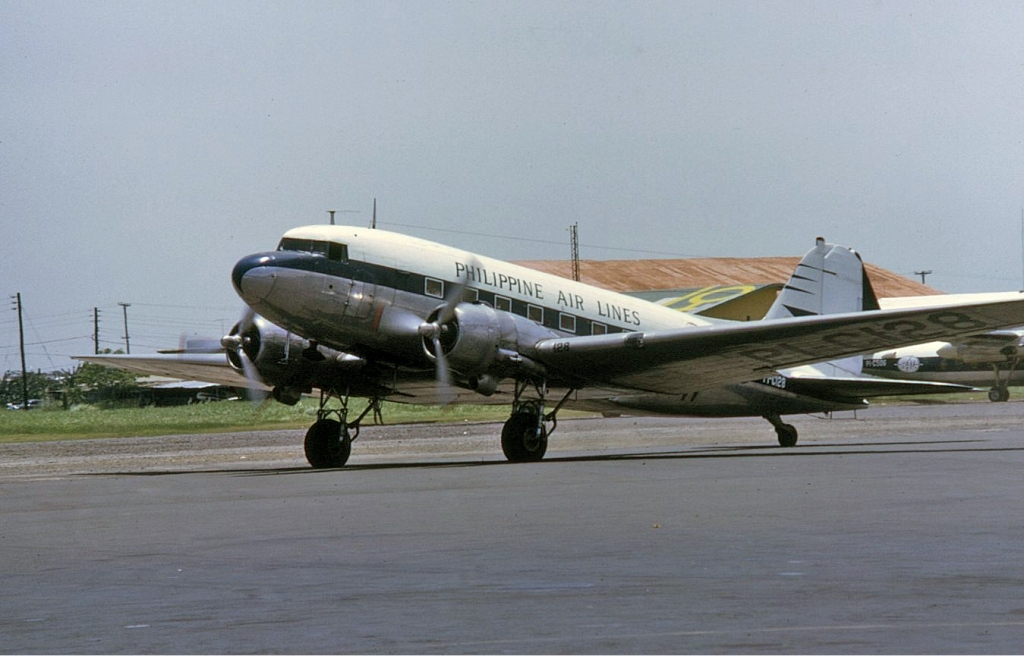
- A Philippine Air Lines DC-3 similar to the accident aircraft

Accident
- Date: October 20, 1965
- Summary: Pilot error and overloading leading to loss of control
- Site: near Runway 13, Manila International Airport, Manila, Philippines

Aircraft
- Aircraft type: Douglas DC-3
- Operator: Philippine Air Lines
- Registration: PI-C144
- Flight origin: Manila International Airport, Pasay, Philippines
- 1st stopover: Legazpi Airport, Legazpi, Philippines
- Last stopover: Calbayog Airport, Calbayog, Philippines
- Destination: Daniel Z. Romualdez Airport, Tacloban, Philippines
- Passengers: 34
- Crew: 3
- Fatalities: 1
- Injuries: 3
- Survivors: 36

Ground casualties
- Ground injuries: 5

Philippine Air Lines Flight 741 was a domestic flight operated by Philippine Air Lines that crashed shortly after takeoff from Manila International Airport in Pasay, south of Manila.

On October 20, 1965, the flight departed from Manila's Runway 13, when the aircraft began slowly but gradually banking and veering to the left. The co-pilot had reported that the rudder may be jammed, and that the engines were working fine. At an altitude of 150 feet (46 m), the left bank was momentarily corrected and the right rudder pedal was applied, however this failed to stop the gradual left bank.

The aircraft's airspeed reached 85 to 90 mph (137 to 145 km/h), where it lost airspeed despite attempts at pushing the yoke forward. The left wing struck a tree, before continuing in a nose-down altitude and striking an electric pole, finally striking the ground at a 30° angle and nosing over.

The flight crashed on the starting leg of a route with two stopovers at Legazpi and Calbayog, before ending in Tacloban.

== Aircraft and crew ==
The aircraft was a Douglas DC-3 (C-47A-25-DK) manufactured in the United States and had its first flight in 1944, registered as 42–93486 before being delivered to Philippine Air Lines and re-registered as PI-C144.

Its airworthiness certificate was issued on December 18, 1964, and was valid until December 17, 1965.

At the time of the crash, the aircraft had flown a total of 28,139 hours. The manifest prepared by company personnel and signed by the crew contained an error, which when corrected, exceeded the maximum trip payload by 83 kg (183 lb). Additionally, the maximum takeoff weight was exceeded by 68 lb (31 kg) as maximum was 26,900 lb (12,200 kg). The center of gravity limits were calculated and were found to be within allowable limits.

=== Crew ===
The captain (33) held an airline pilot's license with ratings on DC-3 aircraft, valid until October 31, 1965. His last route qualification check was conducted nearly three weeks before. In March 1964, he was given a route qualification check where he scored unsatisfactory grades on engine start-ups and pre-takeoff checks, however in subsequent checks he was rated average. He flew a total of 5,146 hours at the time of the crash. His medical certificate showed no waiver or limitation.

The first-officer (29) held a commercial pilot's license with a rating on DC-3 aircraft. He became a regular DC-3 co-pilot on August 12. At the time, his medical certificate was valid, however the airline's medical check had expired in July 1965. He flew a total of 2,843 hours.

== Crash ==
Flight 741 departed from Manila International Airport's runway 13 at 10:32 PHT with the first officer flying in the right-hand seat. Upon becoming airborne, the captain was asked to raise the landing gear. After it was done, the pilots reported that the aircraft was abnormally veering to the left, though indications of the engine instruments were normal. The co-pilot stated that the right rudder seemed to be jammed.

At this time, the aircraft continued to bank and veer to the left. The captain then took over the controls. The engine readings were rechecked, which read normal.

The engines were on the METO power setting at an airspeed of 110 mph (180 km/h). When the aircraft reached 150 feet (46 m), at a heading of 050° and an airspeed of 85–90 mph (137–145 km/h), the left bank and turn was momentarily checked and the right rudder pedal was applied. The co-pilot attempted to contact Manila ATC, but the transmission was garbled – during this time the aircraft returned to its left bank and turn, in spite of the captain's attempts to correct it.

When the airspeed reached 85–90 mph, the captain pushed the yoke forward in an effort to gain airspeed, but there was no reaction. At this time the left wing struck a branch of an aguho tree before proceeding in a nose-down altitude, striking an electric post at a 30° angle and nosed over. The flight crashed at 10:33.

A fire started after the crash. Rescue operations started on the burning aircraft, and all the passengers and crew were evacuated.

== Investigation ==
On the day of the crash, a test was made on a DC-3 with the rudder trim tab indicator set to 12° "nose left". Results showed the aircraft acting normally during the initial takeoff roll until it gained enough airspeed when the right rudder pedal appeared hard and the aircraft yawed to the left. Opposite rudder force and adequate pressure on the yoke counteracted the yaw.

Various technical examinations and inspections conducted on the airframe, power plants and their components and accessories did not reveal any evidence of failure prior to the accident.

Testimonies of both pilots showed that while taxiing from the ramp to the runway and during takeoff, there was free movement of the rudder pedals. When the aircraft became airborne, it started to veer slightly to the left. Pressure was applied to the rudder pedals to counteract the turn but was unsuccessful due to the restriction of travel of the rudder pedal. When the airspeed decreased, the pilots managed to move the right rudder pedal forward and the left turn and bank were corrected.

When stationary, with the rudder trim tab indicator set to 8°45" "nose left", the travel of the rudder pedal was unaffected, but as the airspeed increased, the deflected rudder trim tab generated a force which was directly proportional to the square of the airspeed, causing a corresponding deflection of the rudder which deflected the rudder pedals, as if human force was applied to the left rudder pedal, which caused the aircraft to veer to the left.

When the airspeed was around 85–90 mph, the rudder pedal force necessary to offset the asymmetric condition created by the rudder trim tab corresponding to the rudder trim tab indicator setting of 8°45" was less than the maximum force a pilot can exert. However, when the captain took over the controls, while the speed was at 105–110 mph (169–177 km/h), the rudder resistance might've given the impression that it has jammed, but as the airspeed decreased, the rudder pedal was able to be moved forward.

Although the pilots testified that they performed the normal pre-flight inspection and observed the pre-takeoff checklist, the Board believed that the rudder trim tab had been deflected prior to takeoff. During the investigation, the pilots stated that during the flight they did not think of the rudder trim tab, but the captain was concentrated on the control yoke and the rudder pedals to correct the left turn, and that the trim tab should've been checked if the yoke and pedals did not produce a reaction.

The fact that the aircraft was loaded slightly above its allowable gross takeoff weight, the testimony that the landing gear was retracted late, and the carburettor airscoop level locked between the hot and cold position, which could've reduced engine power, when considered separately may not have significantly affected the low altitude reached, but if these facts were considered altogether, including the bank of the aircraft which did not exceed 45°, they could've caused the low altitude during the flight.

It was determined that the duration of flight from takeoff to up to the initial impact was approximately 60 seconds. The time span from the moment the captain took over the controls up to the time when he was able to correct the banking for a short period was approximately 16 seconds. It felt that if the aircraft had gained a higher altitude, the pilots would've had more time to perform all the necessary corrections to avoid the accident.

=== Cause ===
As a result of the investigations, the Civil Aeronautics Administration determined that the probable cause of the accident was the failure of the pilots to set the rudder trim tab to the proper position before takeoff and during the flight. The continuous left turn and bank resulting in the crash was due to the undetected deflection of the rudder trim tab.

It was further determined that the slight exceeding of the maximum takeoff weight at Manila contributed to the accident.
