= Philippine Airlines Flight 443 =

1987 aviation accident

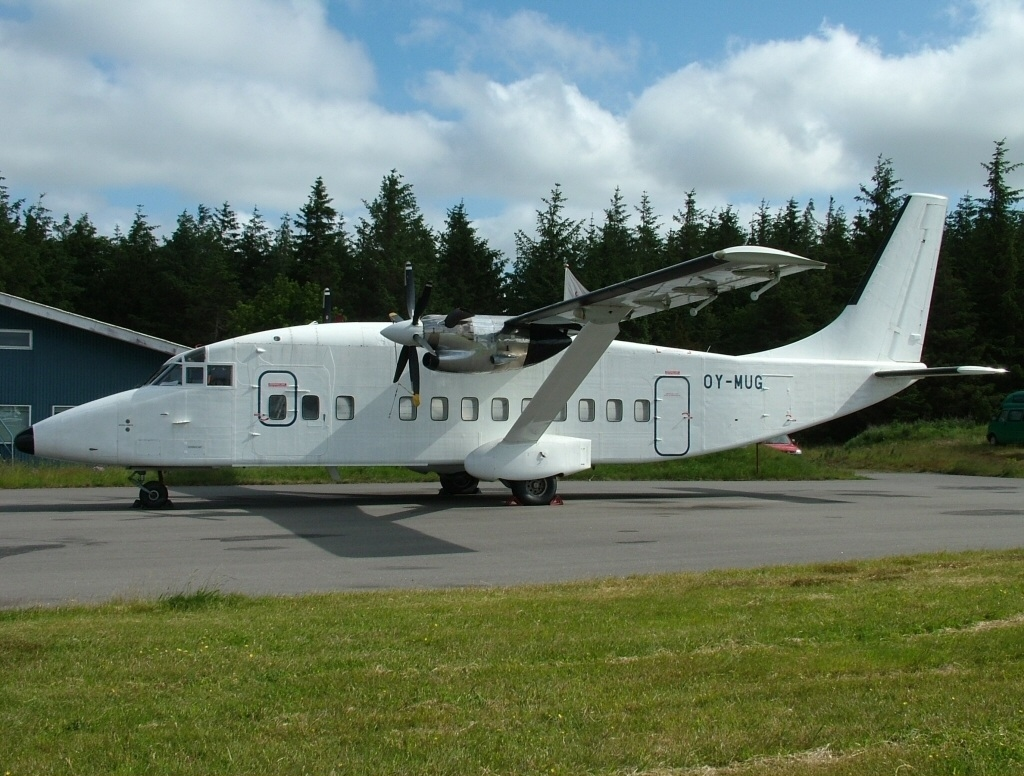
- A Short 360 similar to the accident aircraft

Accident
- Date: December 13, 1987
- Summary: Controlled flight into terrain
- Site: Near Iligan-Maria Cristina Airport, Philippines

Aircraft
- Aircraft type: Short 360-300
- Operator: Philippine Airlines
- Registration: EI-BTJ
- Flight origin: Mactan–Cebu International Airport, Philippines
- Destination: Iligan-Maria Cristina Airport, Philippines
- Passengers: 11
- Crew: 4
- Fatalities: 15
- Survivors: 0

Philippine Airlines Flight 443 was an early morning domestic flight that crashed on approach to Maria Cristina Airport, on December 13, 1987. The flight was intended to fly to Malabang Airport after arriving in Iligan before returning to Cebu.

The Short 360-300 operating the route departed Mactan–Cebu International Airport at 6:42 a.m. local time, with a delay of 17 minutes. The last radio contact was at 7:17 a.m, local time, when the aircraft was on approach to land at Iligan, on Runway 02. During approach, the aircraft crashed onto the side of Mount Gurain, a nearby mountain to the airport that was around 5,000 feet (1,500 m) high. The aircraft was damaged beyond repair and all 15 people on board the plane, 11 passengers and 4 crew, were confirmed dead.

== Passengers and crew ==
The crew were identified to be Captain Roberto L. Sarenas, Captain Pastor Quebral, First Officer Abelardo Villarba and stewardess Antoinette Lim.

== Search and recovery ==
Philippine Airlines immediately ordered three planes to fly on the route the aircraft took while the Philippine Air Force assisted the search by sending over two Huey helicopters, however efforts were delayed by inclement weather in the area.

On December 19, five days after the crash, the wreckage was found, with ground troops reporting that some of the victims had missing limbs, and that others were badly burnt. There were reports that the crash site was also looted.
