= Sherpa Aircraft Sherpa =

Sherpa
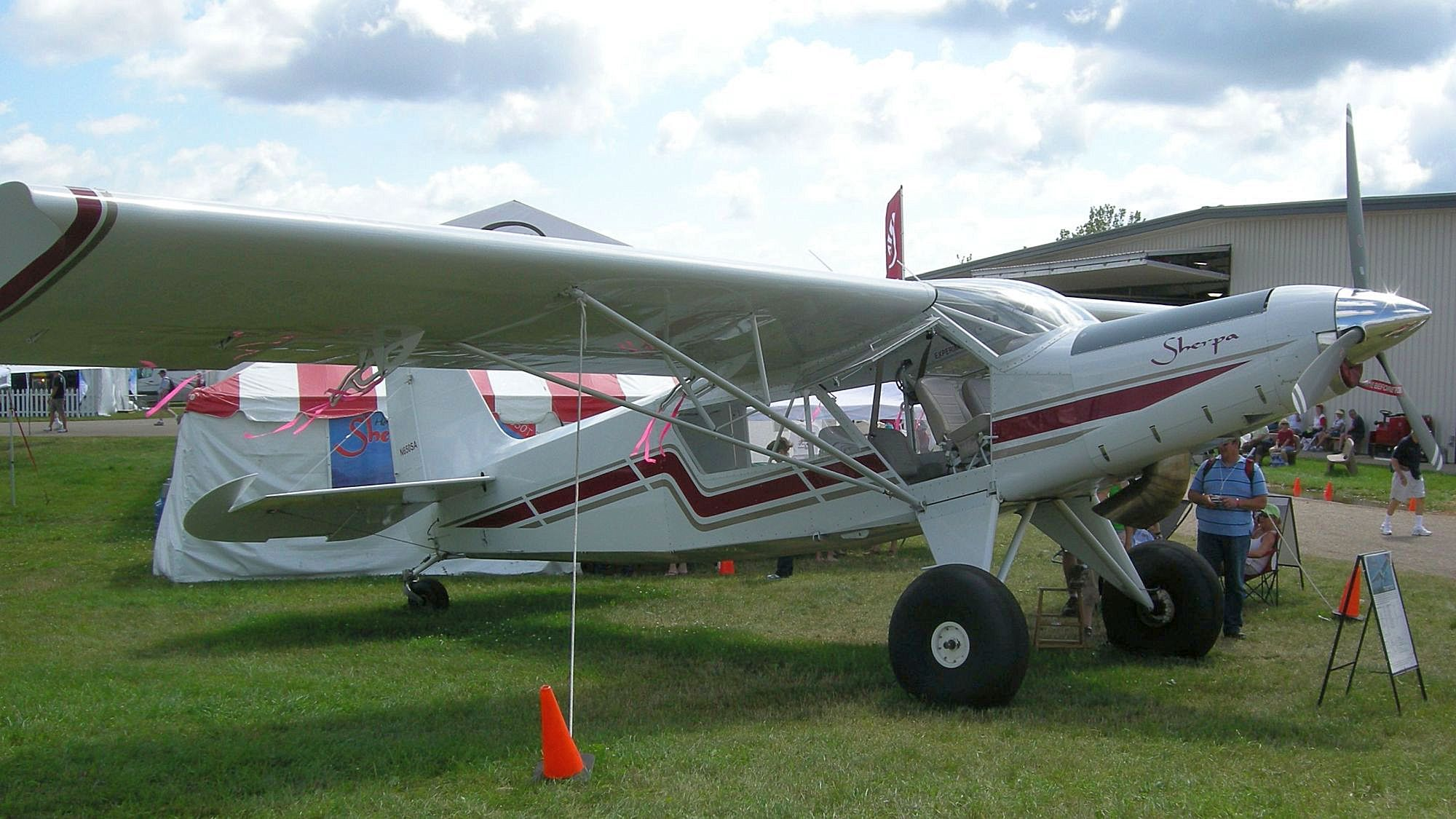
- Sherpa K650T

General information
- Type: Five-seat utility aircraft
- National origin: United States
- Manufacturer: Sherpa Aircraft Manufacturing

History
- First flight: 1994

The Sherpa Aircraft Sherpa is an American five-seat utility aircraft designed and built by Sherpa Aircraft Manufacturing Inc. The aircraft is made in two variants, a piston engined K500 and a turboprop K650T. The aircraft has a fixed conventional landing gear with a tailwheel, also available with alternate large tundra tires, skis or floats.

== Variants ==
Sherpa K500
Five-seat variant powered by a Lycoming IO-720 piston engine.

Sherpa K650T
Improved eight-seat variant powered by a Honeywell TPE331 turboprop. One completed and flown by 2011.

== Specifications (K500) ==
Data from Jane's All the World's Aircraft

General characteristics

- Crew: 1
- Capacity: 4
- Length: 30 ft 3 in (9.22 m)
- Wingspan: 42 ft 7 in (12.98 m)
- Height: 9 ft 2 3/4 in (2.81 m)
- Wing area: 258 sq ft (24.0 m^{2})
- Aspect ratio: 7.0:1
- Empty weight: 2,585 lb (1,173 kg)
- Gross weight: 4,750 lb (2,155 kg)
- Fuel capacity: 121 US gal (101 imp gal; 460 L)
- Powerplant: 1 × Lycoming IO-720 piston engine , 400 hp (300 kW)

Performance

- Cruise speed: 161 mph (259 km/h, 140 kn) (75% power): 138 mph (222 km/h; 120 kn) (econ. cruise)
- Stall speed: 40 mph (64 km/h, 35 kn) (flaps down)
- Never exceed speed: 212 mph (341 km/h, 184 kn)
- Range: 1,108 mi (1,783 km, 963 nmi) (econ. cruise)
- Service ceiling: 21,000 ft (6,400 m)
- Rate of climb: 1,480 ft/min (7.5 m/s)
- Take off run: 396 ft (121 m)
