= Philippine Air Lines Flight S26 =

1960 Philippine airliner crash

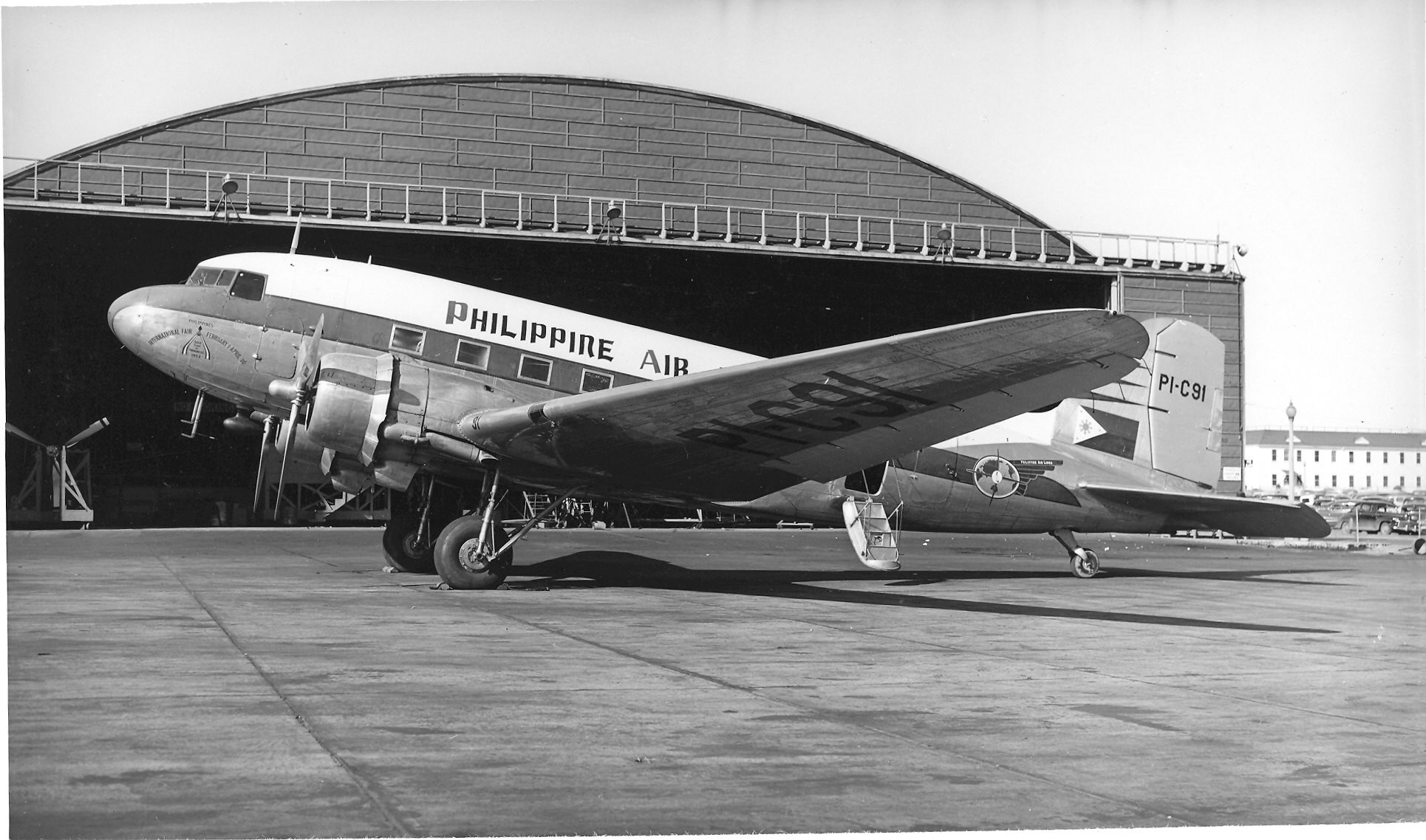
- A Philippine Air Lines DC-3 similar to the accident aircraft

Accident
- Date: 23 November 1960
- Summary: Controlled flight into terrain
- Site: Mount Baco, Philippines

Aircraft
- Aircraft type: Douglas DC-3C
- Operator: Philippine Air Lines
- Registration: PI-C133
- Flight origin: Iloilo-Mandurriao Airport, Iloilo City, Philippines
- Destination: Manila International Airport, Pasay, Rizal, Philippines
- Occupants: 33
- Passengers: 29
- Crew: 4
- Fatalities: 33
- Survivors: 0

Philippine Air Lines Flight S26 was a domestic flight that departed from Mandurriao Airport in Iloilo on 23 November 1960 at 17:33 PHT to Manila International Airport near Manila.

At 18:33 the crew gave its last position report before crashing on the slopes of Mount Baco in the island of Mindoro at 6,000 feet (1,800 m). When it failed to give a position report at 19:00, attempts were made to contact the aircraft on all frequencies, but were unsuccessful.

== Aircraft and crew ==
The aircraft was a Douglas DC-3 manufactured in the United States during World War II and purchased by Philippine Air Lines in 1946. The plane was acquired in 1948 and registered as PI-C142 a year later.

In 1953, PI-C142 made a forced landing in a rice paddy near Tuguegarao with no fatalities. It was repaired and re-registered to PI-C133 in 1954.

The plane had around 18,000 flight hours at the time of the crash. It held a valid airworthiness certificate that expired in September 1961.

The captain held an airline pilot's license and logged 13,606 hours. He was qualified on the Manila-Iloilo-Manila route as captain in May 1954, and his medical record required that he had to wear corrective lenses while exercising his pilot's license.

The first officer held a commercial pilot's license with the DC-3 and logged 2,495 hours. He began flying with the Philippine Air Force flying C-47s.

The second officer also held a commercial pilot's license with the DC-3 and logged 1,484 hours, of only 7 being with Philippine Air Lines.

== Wreckage ==
The wreckage was found on 30 November, 10 miles (16 km) northwest of Wasig, Mansalay, Oriental Mindoro and strewn over an area 100 m (330 ft) in diameter. The aircraft had razed several small trees before striking a large guiso tree. The fuselage was smashed and burnt, and both engines were thrown 4 to 5 meters (13 to 16 ft) from the tree. The propeller blades were not burned but they were badly twisted.

The throttles appeared to be on the normal cruise setting, except that both mixture control levers were found to be halfway between the auto-lean and the idle cutoff position. The electrical panel had disintegrated.

The VHF control box was found at the 119.7 frequency and the high-frequency radio was found at the 6597 kc/s PAL frequency.

== Probable cause ==
The probable cause was possibly a navigational error, as there were adverse weather conditions, poor visibility, a 25-knot (46 km/h; 29 mph) eastern crosswind and a possible malfunction of the airborne navigational equipment due to atmospheric disturbance and night and terrain effects.

The pilots were expected to follow an airway "Amber-I" which was a straight line above Romblon however it was found that the aircraft had deviated around 30 miles from the initial flight path. Investigators could not understand how an experienced captain would have deviated from his flight path by 32 miles. Other flights flying in front and behind Flight S26 stated that the visibility throughout the area was fine, and that the pilots would have safely reached their destination using visual flight rules even if both of the aircraft's ADFs failed.

It was suggested that the aircraft had drifted from its flight path due to crosswinds that resulted in the aircraft flying over Mindoro, and the crew were not alarmed because of the poor visibility.

After the crash, relatives of deceased passengers filed lawsuits against Philippine Air Lines for moral damages, income losses and legal fees. Though in one case the airline had denied the accident due to negligence, overall they were ordered to pay over ₱50,000 (equivalent to ₱5,928,142 in 2021) to ₱200,000 (equivalent to ₱23,712,566 in 2021) in damages to families of the deceased passengers.
