= Philippine Air Lines Flight F26 =

1964 aviation incident in the Philippines

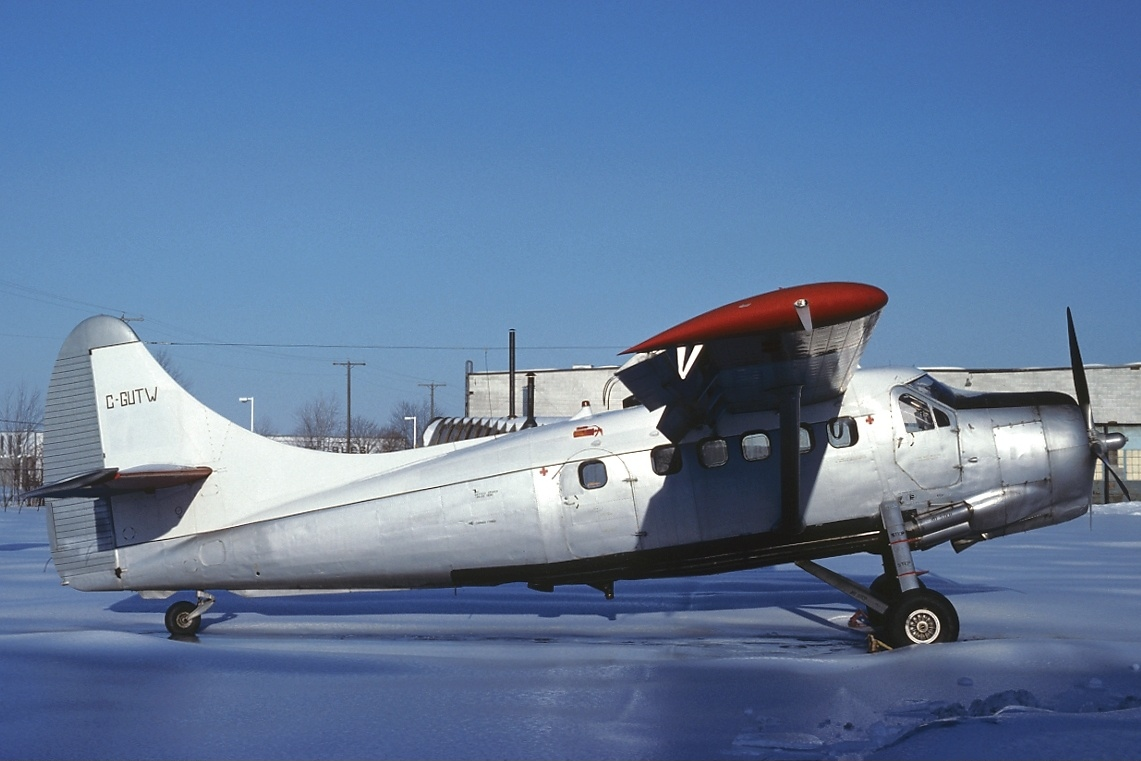
- A DHC-3 Otter similar to the accident aircraft

Accident
- Date: May 20, 1964
- Summary: Controlled flight into terrain in bad weather
- Site: Sibuco Point, near Sibuco, Philippines; 7°15′3″N 122°1′0″E

Aircraft
- Aircraft type: de Havilland Canada DHC-3 Otter
- Operator: Philippine Air Lines
- Registration: PI-C51
- Flight origin: Siocon Airport, Siocon, Philippines
- Destination: Zamboanga Airport, Zamboanga, Philippines
- Passengers: 10
- Crew: 1
- Fatalities: 11
- Survivors: 0

Philippine Air Lines Flight F26 was a domestic flight operated by Philippine Air Lines that crashed en route to Zamboanga Airport, Zamboanga on May 20, 1964.

On May 20, 1964, the DHC-3 Otter was flying in heavy rain, which reduced the visibility to nearly zero. While flying under visual flight rules, the aircraft struck a hill at Sibuco Point, destroying the aircraft. There were no survivors.

== Aircraft and pilot ==
The aircraft was a De Havilland Canada DHC-3 Otter (c/n 68) and was one of the six Otters delivered to Philippine Air Lines. It was the first aircraft of this type to be delivered to the airline, being acquired in February 1955.

Test flights were conducted in Downsview, Toronto before being disassembled and shipped to Manila, Philippines where it would be re-assembled and used by Philippine Air Lines as part of their "Rural Air Service".

It had an airworthiness certificate valid until August 20, 1964.

At the time of the crash, the Otter had flown 7,197 hours, and was properly maintained in accordance with its maintenance manual.

The pilot (32) was the only crew member on board, and held an airline pilot's license with ratings for the DHC-3 and Douglas DC-3. He had flown 4,163 hours including 342 on the Otter. Prior to the crash, he passed a route qualification check and was assigned captain of the flight route in January 1964. His medical certificate showed no waiver or limitations.

== Background ==
Flight F26 originated from Zamboanga Airport at 06:50 PHT as part of a domestic flight route that would go to Siocon, then Liloy, then Dipolog, before returning to Siocon and ending back at Zamboanga.

The flight landed in Siocon at 07:30, where the pilot was informed of unfavourable weather conditions en route and at his destination. Instead of following the scheduled route, he decided to return direct to Zamboanga. Heavy rain and squalls were around the western Mindanao coast which made conditions unfavourable for VFR flights.

== Crash ==
At approximately 08:10, the flight took off returning to Zamboanga due to the worsening weather conditions, with 10 passengers on board. The takeoff and climb were normal and no operating difficulties were reported. The pilot chose to use visual flight rules, "hugging" the Mindanao shoreline at a low altitude, especially as the Otter was not equipped with suitable navigational instruments for an IFR flight, which would've been more suitable.

At 09:57, the PAL radio operator at Zamboanga received a blind garbled transmission from the pilot. It was presumed that the pilot was attempting to report the bad weather he was in. This was the last radio transmission from the aircraft. When the radio operator called back, he received no answer - at approximately 10:00, the aircraft struck a hill while flying at VFR at Sibuco Point, colliding with trees and totally destroying the aircraft.

The aircraft hit a molave tree at about 200 ft above sea level in a left bank. The left wing severed from the aircraft and the vertical stabiliser was severely damaged. The nose section hit another tree before finally settling on the ground at a 30° angle.

The wreckage was found hours later, being destroyed by fire. There were no survivors. It was the fourth PAL DHC-3 Otter to crash.

== Cause ==
The DHC-3 Otter was not equipped with navigational aid and therefore was only favourable for flights under visual flight rules. It was determined that the pilot continued to fly under VFR in unfavourable weather over the jagged shorelines with practically zero visibility due to heavy rain.

There was a heavy squall at the crash site. Weather conditions across western Mindanao were generally unfavourable for VFR flights. When the flight took off from Siocon, the destination was below IFR minimum.

== Aftermath ==
Shortly after the crash, the Civil Aviation Administration suspended the operation of Philippine Air Lines' Otters until they were fitted with automatic direction finders and more powerful high-frequency radios, and that they should exercise more supervision over pilots based at Zamboanga.

After the crash, the Otters were not returned to service, and the two surviving aircraft of the airline's fleet was used on charter flights before being sold.
