= Philippine Air Lines Flight 785 =

1966 plane crash in the Philippines

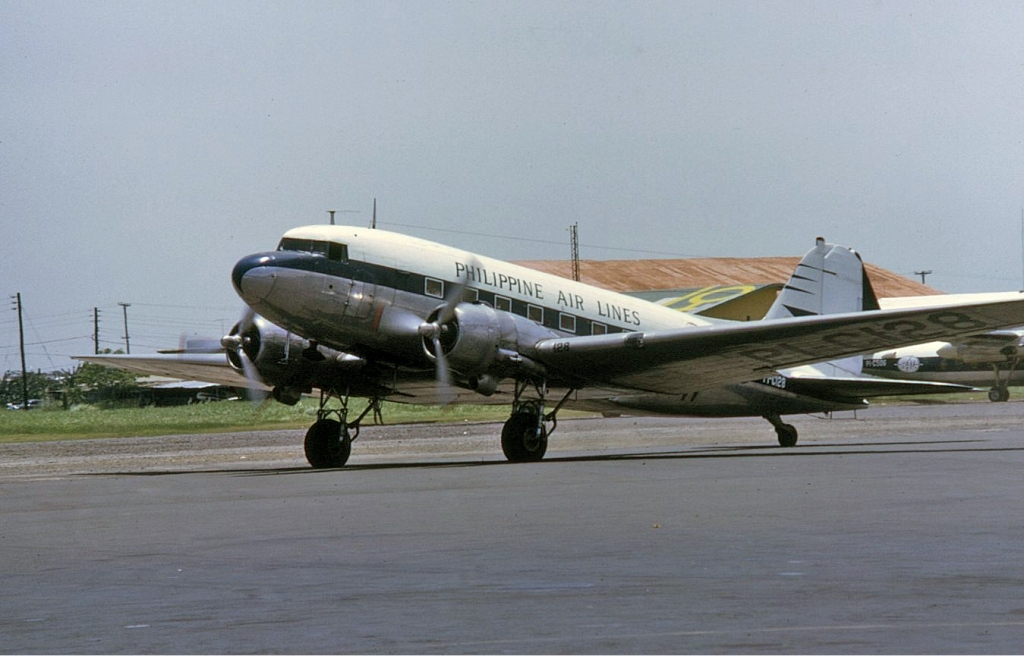
- A Philippine Air Lines DC-3 similar to the accident aircraft

Accident
- Date: June 29, 1966
- Summary: Controlled flight into terrain due to pilot error aggravated by strong turbulence and gusts
- Site: near Sablayan, Occidental Mindoro, Philippines

Aircraft
- Aircraft type: Douglas DC-3
- Operator: Philippine Air Lines
- Registration: PI-C17
- Flight origin: Manila International Airport, Pasay, Rizal, Philippines
- Stopover: Mamburao Airport, Mamburao, Philippines
- Destination: San Jose Airport (Mindoro), San Jose, Philippines
- Passengers: 24
- Crew: 4
- Fatalities: 26
- Injuries: 2
- Survivors: 2

Philippine Air Lines Flight 785 was a scheduled domestic flight operated by Philippine Air Lines that crashed en route to San Jose Airport, Occidental Mindoro, Philippines.

On June 29, 1966, the flight crashed on the slopes of Mount Rabangan near Sablayan, on the second leg of a Manila-Mamburao-San Jose route that originated from Manila.

This was the deadliest peacetime air disaster in Occidental Mindoro.

== Aircraft and crew ==
The aircraft was a Douglas DC-3 manufactured in the United States and had its first flight in 1944, registered as 43-16107, before being delivered to Philippine Airlines and re-registered as PI-C17.

It had an airworthiness certificate valid until July 18, 1966.

The aircraft underwent an airframe and engine check about 9 hours before the crash. Maintenance records showed that due to mechanical defects, the left propeller assembly was changed thrice between February and June 1966, and the right propeller assembly was changed twice during the month of May 1966. 4 days before the accident, the co-pilot's altimeter was found to be indicated 100 feet (30 m) lower than the captain's altimeter on the same settings.

Despite the altimeter errors, the aircraft was released for scheduled operations until it was replaced on June 27. It was equipped with two automatic direction finders and a VOR rating it suitable for IFR flights. The aircraft's center of gravity was within allowable limits.

=== Crew ===
The captain (35) held an airline pilot's license with instrument ratings on the Douglas DC-3 and Hawker Siddeley HS 748. His records indicated that he was scheduled for a route qualification check on the Manila-Mamburao-San Jose route in September 1965, however because Mamburao Airport was closed for operations at the time, it was redirected to Lubang.

He had flown this route four times between January and June 1966, and had flown a total of 4,240 hours. His medical certificate showed no waivers or limitation, and was valid until the end of August 1966.

The first officer (29) held a commercial pilot's license with instrument ratings on the DC-3 and light aircraft. As of August 1965 he flew a total of 1,777 hours. His medical certificate also showed no waivers or limitation, and was valid until August 1966.

There was also another observer pilot (21) who acquired a student pilot license on October 8, 1964, but also acquired a commercial pilot's license by the FAA on single-engine aircraft. He applied for a commercial pilot's license in January 1966 however he didn't meet the requirements for qualification yet. As of February 1966 he flew a total of 181 hours on light aircraft.

== Crash ==
Flight 785 departed from Manila at 10:30 PHT and arrived at Mamburao Airport uneventfully. For the second leg of the route, the flight was cleared to fly under visual flight rules with a minimum en-route altitude of 3,500 feet (1,100 m). The dispatcher stated that he gave a weather briefing to the crew that continuous heavy rain was expected throughout the segment of the flight. He was unsure of the Flight 785's time of departure and arrival at Mamburao until another aircraft relayed a confirmation message, as it was standard procedure. However, this was not observed on this flight.

At 12:04, the flight departed from Mamburao at 12:04. At 12:15, the pilots requested weather information from San Jose. The requested information was transmitted was acknowledged. However, at the same time, a witness saw an aircraft flying at a low altitude towards mountainous terrain at a heading of 065°. Shortly after the aircraft disappeared from sight, the witness heard a loud explosion. Subsequent efforts from the radio station at San Jose to contact the aircraft were unsuccessful.

== Wreckage and survivors ==
The wreckage and two survivors were found in the afternoon of July 1, 1966 in a ravine at the northern slope of Mount Rabangan, in an altitude of 2,300 feet (700 m). The crash site was between Mamburao and San Jose, near Sablayan.

The entire fuselage except for the outer section of the wings and the tail surfaces were damaged by impact and the ensuing fire. Shears in trees that the aircraft had struck indicated that the aircraft was flying at a heading of 060° and descending. It finally settled upside down at a heading of 240° and caught fire.

=== Survivors ===
Most of the occupants were thrown out the aircraft and sustained injuries and burns of varying degrees.

Two passengers, survived the accident with injuries – one of them was rendered unconscious after sustaining head injuries, however the other survivor reported that the fuselage was severed.

Both further testified that the "No Smoking" and "Fasten Seatbelt" signs were on. They stated that after departure from Mamburao, the aircraft encountered heavy rain and clouds. The clouds were so dark that the wingtips couldn't be seen from the cabin, and that they felt the airplane jolt up and down three times and bank to both sides several times before the impact.

Both survivors were identified as:

- Donato Nagpiing, a farmer from San Jose, Occidental Mindoro.
- Federico Aguilar, an engineering student at FEATI University. He managed to survive on raw wild vegetables growing in the forests and water from the nearby Rayusan River.

== Cause ==
Weather conditions around Sablayan were described to have low, thick and dark clouds with strong winds and heavy rain, and the actual weather was similar to what was forecast by the dispatcher back at Mamburao. 13 minutes after takeoff, the pilots encountered bad weather under visual flight rules.

From the approximate flight path of 060°, it was inferred that Flight 785 was attempting to return to Mamburao when it struck the slopes of Mount Rabangan.

The Civil Aeronautics Administration investigated the crash. The cause was determined to be a misjudgement of the terrain clearance resulting in the collision with trees and the mountainous slope, aggravated by severe turbulence and strong winds over the crash site.
