= De Havilland Canada DHC-3 Otter =

Utility aircraft family

DHC-3 Otter
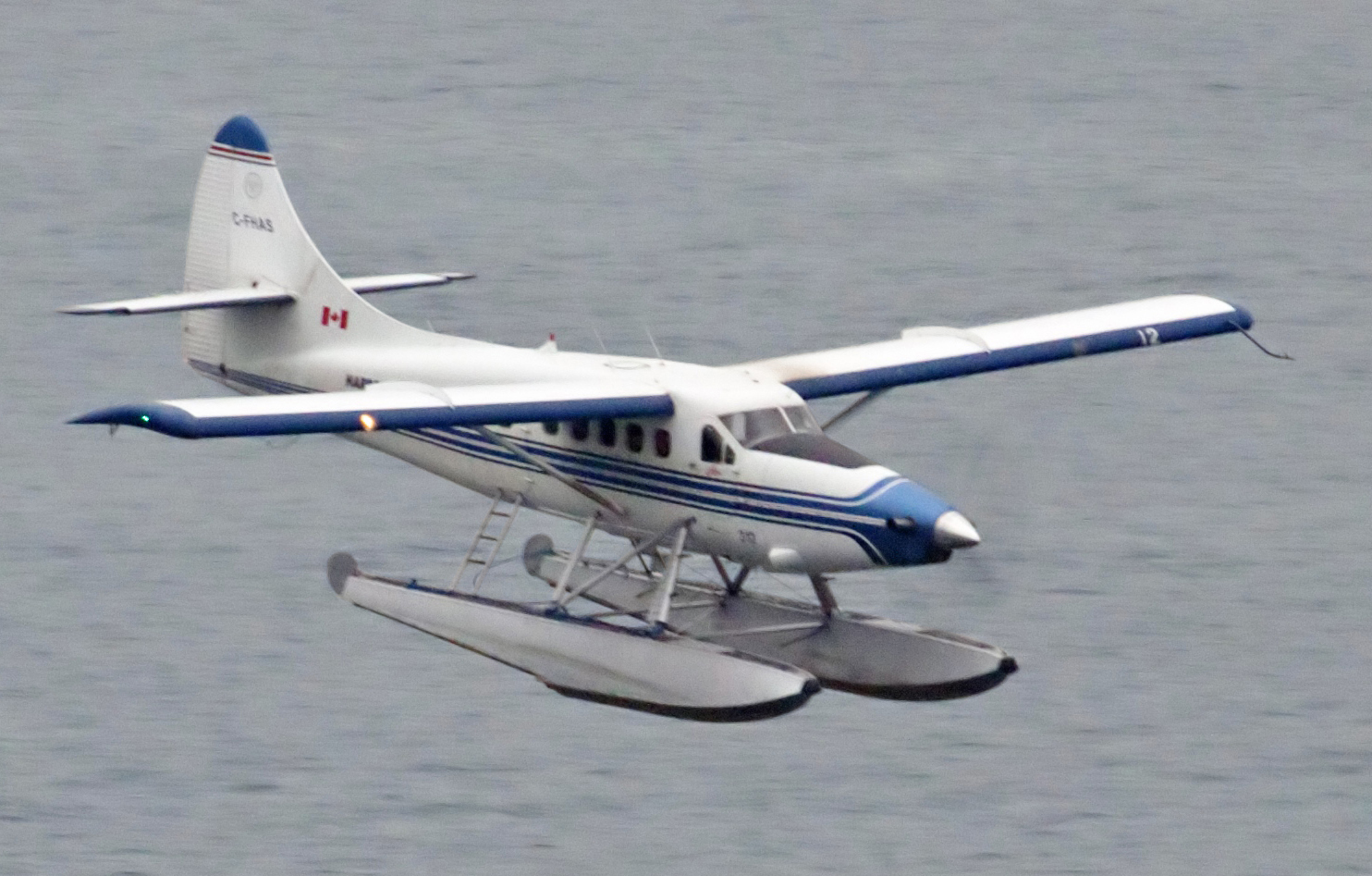
- A DHC-3T Turbine Otter

General information
- Type: STOL utility transport
- Manufacturer: de Havilland Canada
- Status: In service
- Number built: 466

History
- Manufactured: 1951–1967
- Introduction date: 1953
- First flight: 12 December 1951
- Developed into: DHC-6 Twin Otter

The de Havilland Canada DHC-3 Otter is a single-engined, high-wing, propeller-driven, short take-off and landing (STOL) aircraft developed by de Havilland Canada. It was conceived to be capable of performing the same roles as the earlier and highly successful Beaver, including as a bush plane, while also being a larger aircraft. The type certificate of the aircraft is now owned by the De Havilland Canada founded in 2019.

== Design and development ==
The rugged single-engined, high-wing, propeller-driven DHC-3 Otter was conceived in January 1951 by de Havilland Canada as a larger, more powerful version of its highly successful DHC2 Beaver STOL utility transport. Dubbed the "King Beaver" during design, it would be the veritable "one-ton truck" to the Beaver's "half-ton" role.

The Otter received Canadian certification in November 1952 and entered production shortly thereafter. Using the same overall configuration as the Beaver, the new, much heavier design incorporated a longer fuselage, greater-span wing, and cruciform tail. Seating in the main cabin expanded from six to 10 or 11. Power was supplied by a 450-kW (600 hp) Pratt & Whitney R-1340 geared radial. The version used in the Otter was geared for lower propeller revolutions and consequently lower airspeed. The electrical system was 28 volts D.C.

Like the Beaver, the Otter can be fitted with skis or floats. The Otter served as the basis for the very successful Twin Otter, which features two wing-mounted Pratt & Whitney Canada PT6 turboprops. A total of 466 Otters were manufactured.

== Operational use ==
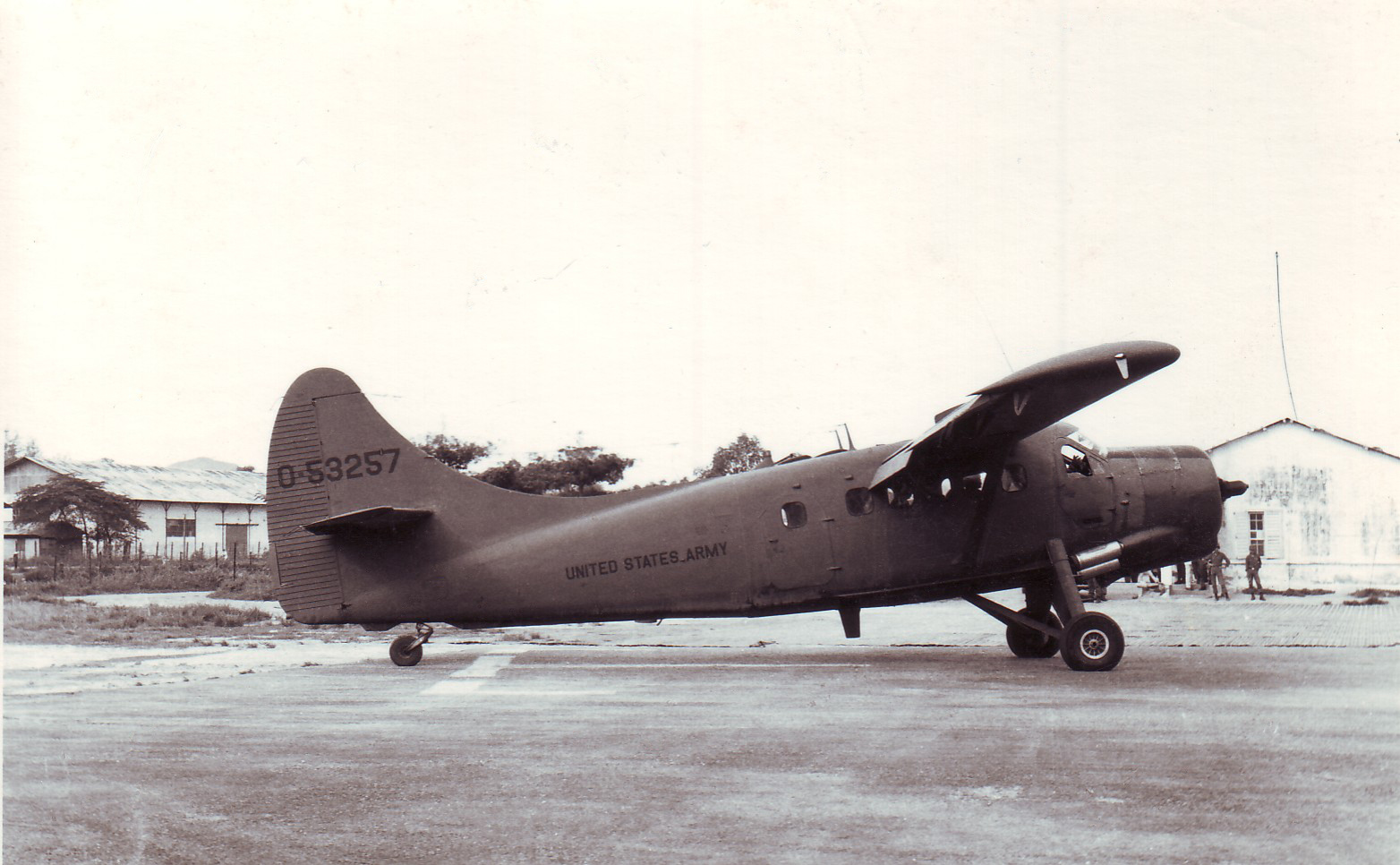
U.S. Army U-1A, July 1967 Hue Citadel Airfield, Republic of Vietnam

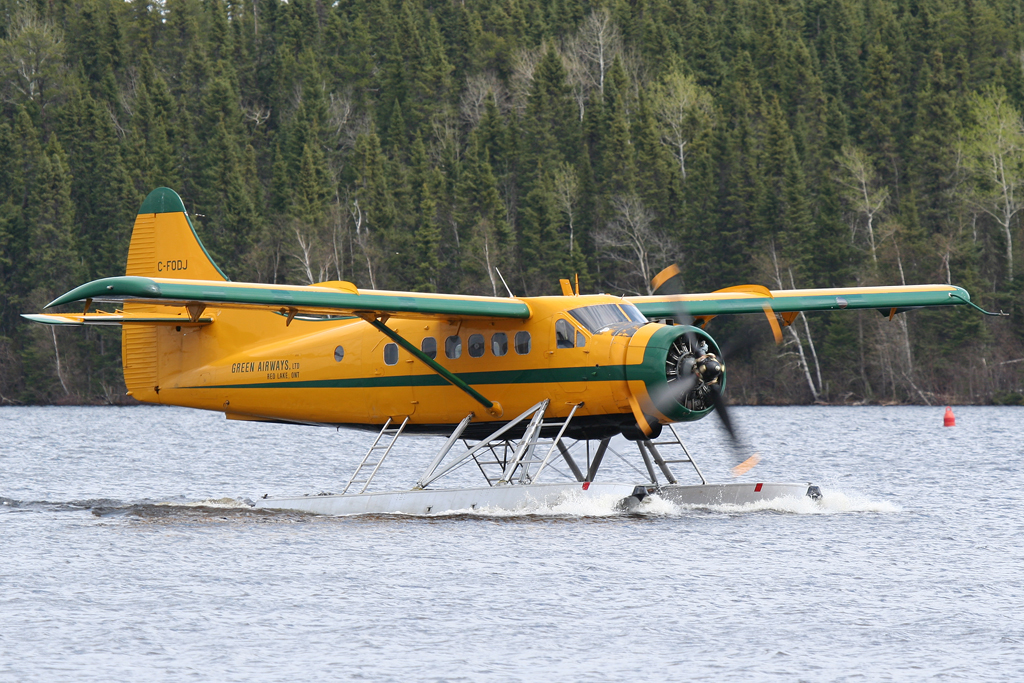
Otter on floats, powered by a PZL Kalisz ASz-62IR with four blade propeller

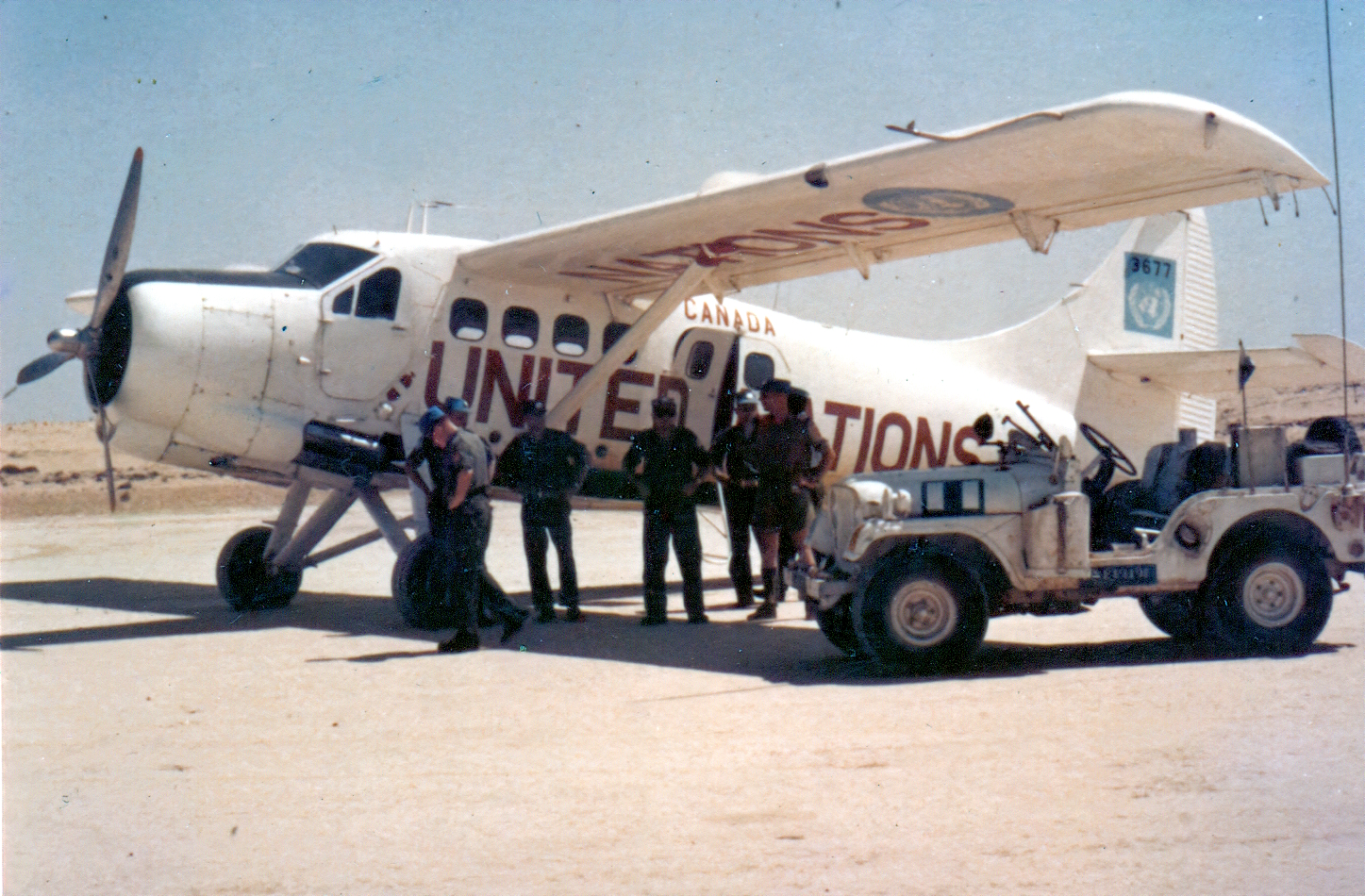
F/L Lynn Garrison and crew with UNEF Otter, Sinai, 1962

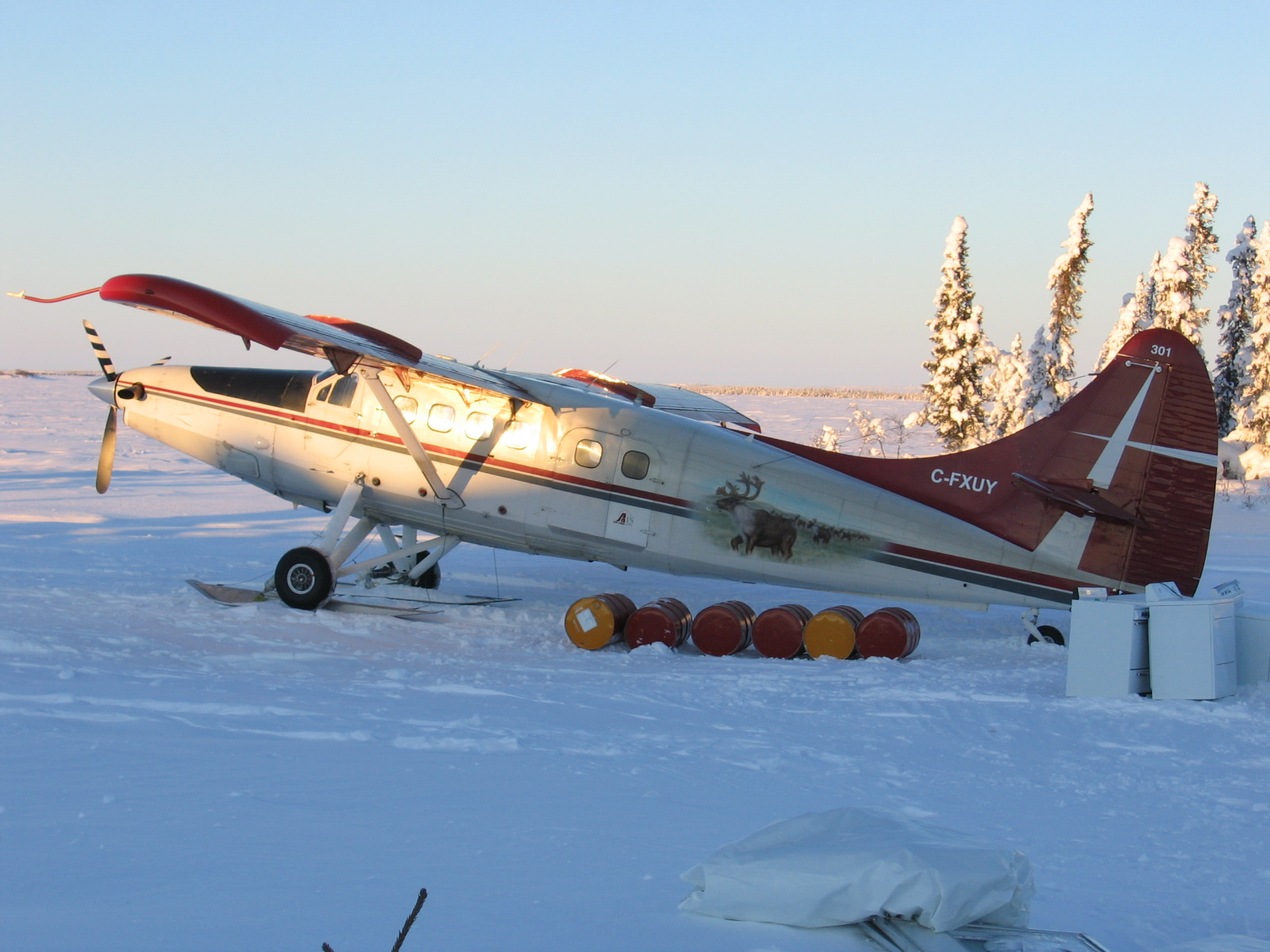
Turbo Otter on wheel-skis

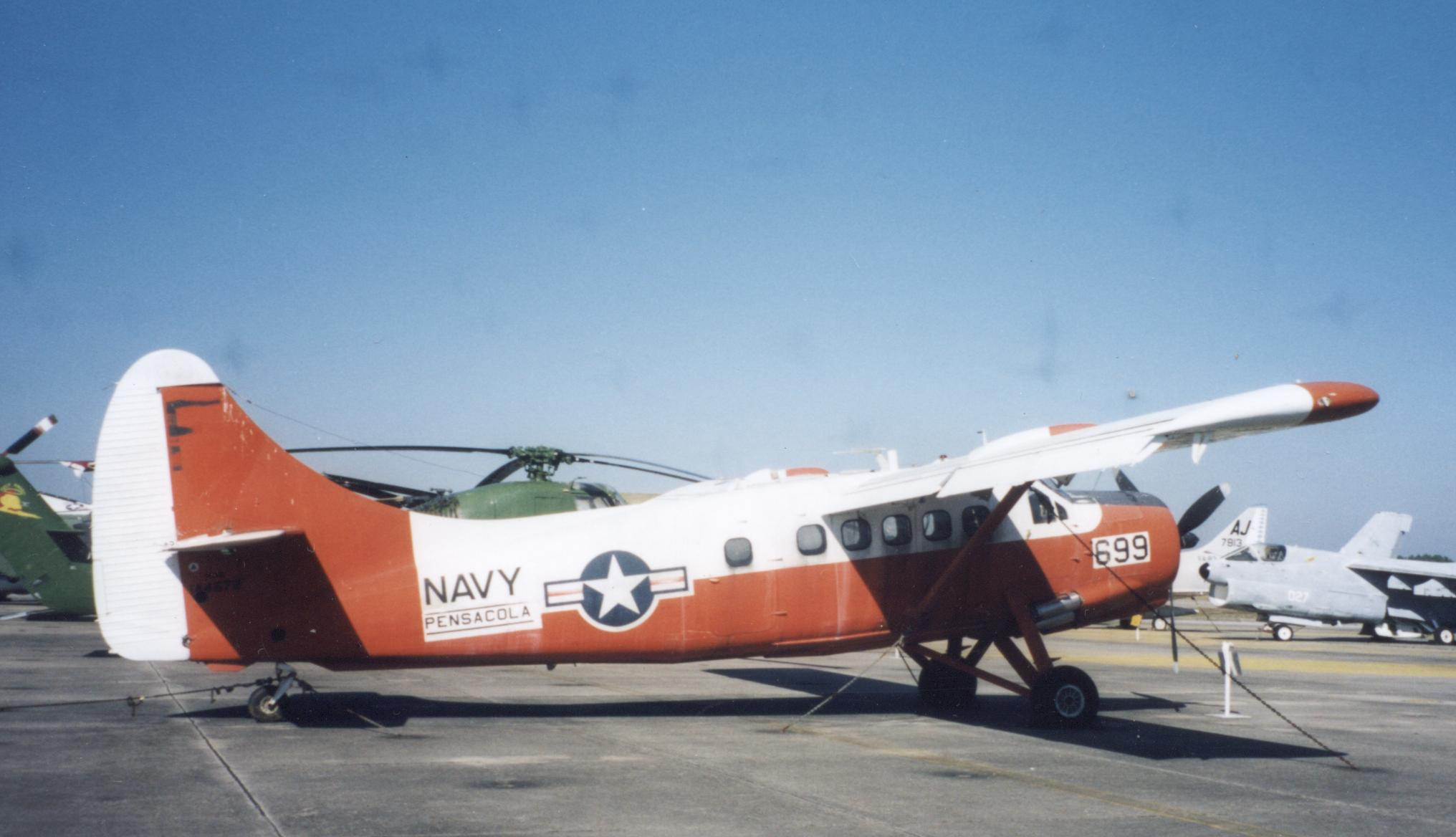
U.S. Navy U-1B (UC-1) Otter at NAS Pensacola, Florida, in 2002

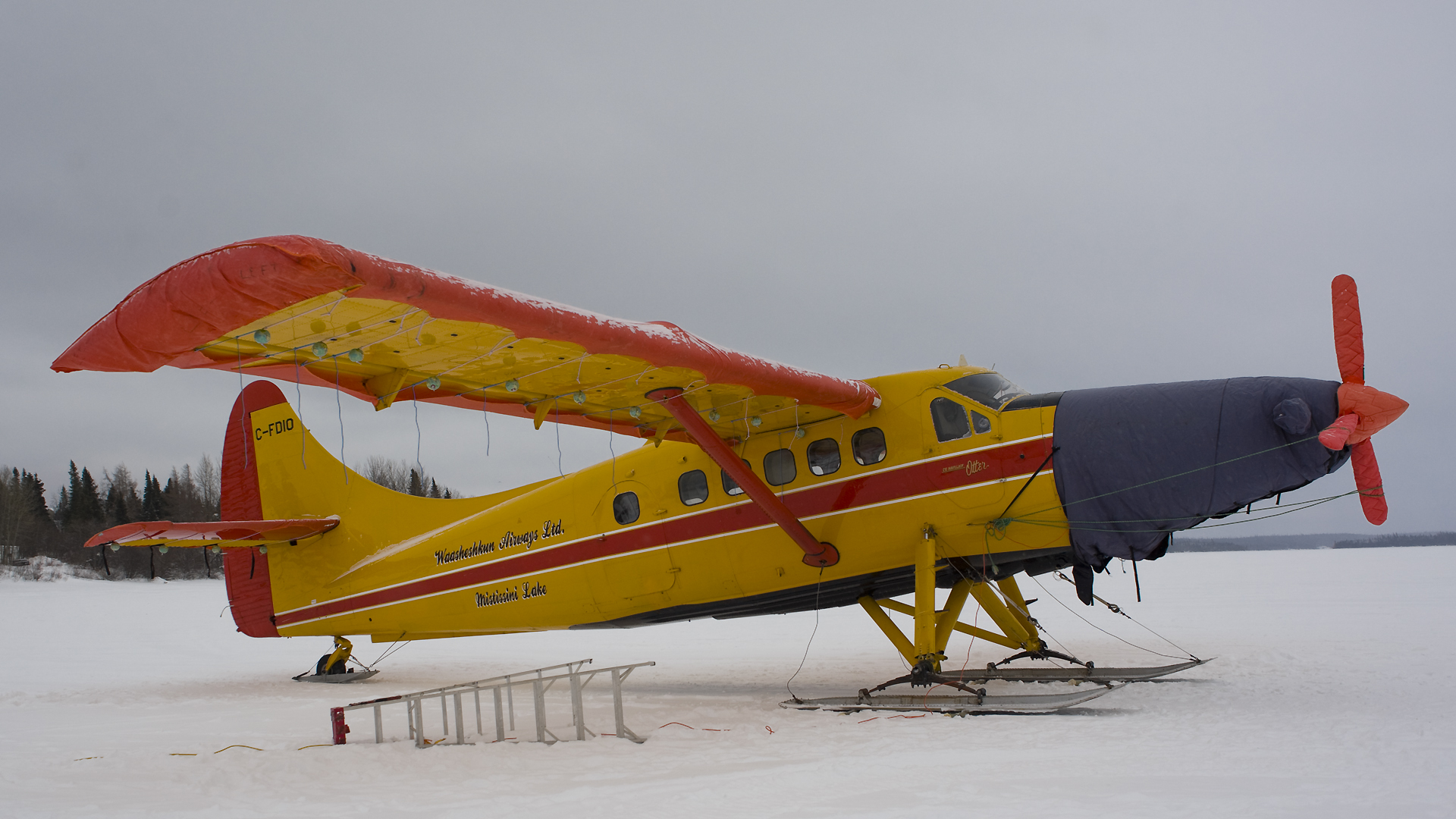
Otter with turbine engine conversion, covered against the cold on Mistassini lake, Mistissini, Quebec

The DHC-3/CC-123/CSR-123 Otter was used until 1980 by the Royal Canadian Air Force and its successor, the Air Command of the Canadian Forces. It was used in Search and Rescue, as the "CSR" denotes Canadian Search (and) Rescue (type 123) and as a light utility transport, "CC" denoting Canadian Cargo. During the Suez Crisis, the Canadian government decided to provide assistance to the United Nations Emergency Force and the Royal Canadian Navy carrier HMCS Magnificent carried 4 Otters from Halifax to Port Said in Egypt early in 1957, with all four flying off unassisted while the ship was at anchor. This was the only occasion when RCAF fixed wing aircraft operated from a Canadian warship. It was also operated on EDO floats on water and skis for winter operations on snow. The EDO floats also had wheels for use on runways (amphibious). It was used as army support dropping supplies by parachute, and also non-parachute low-speed, low-altitude air drops, to support the Canadian Army on manoeuvres. In the end it was operated by the Primary Air Reserve in Montreal, Toronto, Edmonton and Winnipeg, with approximately 10 aircraft at each base, as well as by the RSU (Regular (Forces) Support Units) at those bases. It was usually flown with a single pilot (Commissioned Officer) in the left seat and a Technical Air Crewman (NCO) in the right seat. The Kiowa helicopter replaced it in Air Reserve squadrons.

Although the Otter found ready acceptance in bush airlines, as in a similar scenario to the DHC-2 Beaver, the United States Army soon became the largest operator of the aircraft (184 delivered as the U-1A Otter). Other military users included Australia, Canada, and India, but the primary role of the aircraft as a rugged bush plane continues to this day.

An Otter crossed the South Pole in 1957 (see Commonwealth Trans-Antarctic Expedition). The Otter is also popular in the skydiving community and can be found in many drop zones throughout the world.

Otters were used by Qantas from 1958 to 1960 in Papua New Guinea. The Qantas aircraft were then transferred to Trans Australian Airlines (TAA), a major Australian domestic airline, which operated the Otters in Papua New Guinea until 1966 when they were withdrawn from use. TAA was merged with Qantas in 1990.

=== Modifications ===
The most extensively modified Otter was RCAF Otter 3682. After initial service as a standard Search and Rescue aircraft it was used to explore the aerodynamic aspects of STOL. In 1958, it was fitted with flaps so outsized that, with their 45 degree droop, it became known as the Batwing Otter. In addition, its tail-wheel undercarriage was replaced with a high energy-absorption 4-wheel arrangement and a very high vertical tail. The next modification replaced the flaps with fully retractable flaps suitable for cruising flight and high drag was obtained with reverse thrust from a J85 turbojet installed in the fuselage behind the cockpit. The third configuration looked a lot like the future Twin Otter and was the first twin-PT6 fixed-wing installation to fly in May 1963 (A twin PT6-engined helicopter, the Kaman K-1125, had flown in April 1963). The piston engine in the nose was replaced with wing-mounted engines to blow over the flaps.

Stolairus Aviation of Kelowna, BC, has developed several modifications for the DHC-3 including a STOL Kit, which modifies the wing with a contoured leading edge and drooped wingtips for increased performance. Stolairus has also developed a 180 kilograms (400 lb) "upgross" kit which increases the gross weight of the DHC-3 to 3,795 kilograms (8,367 lb) on floats.

Some aircraft were converted to turbine power using a PT6A, Walter 601 (manufactured in the Czech Republic), or Garrett/Honeywell TPE331-10, by Texas Turbine Conversions. The Walter M601E-11 Turbine Engine conversion is manufactured and installed by Stolairus Aviation.

A Polish PZL radial engine has also been fitted. Re-engined aircraft have been offered since the 1980s by Airtech Canada as the DHC-3/1000 using current-production 1,000 hp (745 kW) PZL ASz-62 IR radials.

== Variants ==
DHC-3 Otter
Single-engined STOL utility transport aircraft.
CSR-123 Otter
STOL utility transport aircraft for the Royal Canadian Air Force.
YU-1 Otter
Six test and evaluation aircraft for the U.S. Army.
U-1A Otter
STOL utility transport aircraft for the U.S. Army.
UC-1 Otter
STOL utility transport aircraft for the United States Navy. Later redesignated U-1B Otter in 1962.
DHC-3-T Turbo-Otter
Otters fitted with either Pratt & Whitney Canada PT6A-27 or Pratt & Whitney Canada PT6A-34 turboprop engine.
Airtech Canada DHC-3/1000 Otter
Conversions powered by PZL Kalisz ASz-62IR engines.
Texas Turbines Super Otter
Turbine conversion powered by a 900 shp (671 kW) Garret TPE331 turboprop engine
Aerotech Industries
Turbine conversion powered by a 900shp Pratt & Whitney Canada PT6A-140A turboprop engine.

== Military operators ==
Argentina

- Argentine Air Force: Former operator

Australia

- Royal Australian Air Force: Two Otters (RAAF serial A100-1 and 2) were in service with the RAAF from 1961 to 1967. The aircraft were used for passenger and freight transport duties at the Weapons Research Establishment, Woomera, South Australia.
  - No. 1 Air Trials Unit

Bangladesh

- Bangladesh Air Force: Former operator

Burma

- Burma Air Force

Canada

- Royal Canadian Air Force

Chile

- Chilean Air Force

Costa Rica

- Air Surveillance Service

Ethiopia

- Ethiopian Air Force

Ghana

- Ghana Air Force – acquired twelve Otters (G300 – G311), in service 1961-1973 (serial number: 413, 414, 416, 418, 420, 422, 424, 425, 426, 428, 430, 431).
  - Four aircraft had to be written off, eight aircraft were sold in 1973.
    - G300 (s/n 413) crashed on 21 June 1968 in the jungle in the Brong Ahafo region of Ghana and was destroyed.
    - G301 (s/n 414) crashed on 31 August 1961 at Kintampo in the Brong Ahafo region of Ghana and was destroyed.
    - G302 (s/n 416) crashed on the beach near Takoradi on a date unknown and was destroyed. It was on floats at the time, on a training detail.
    - G308 (s/n 426) was written off in service.

India

- Indian Air Force

Indonesia

- Indonesian Air Force

Khmer Republic

- Khmer Air Force: Former operator

New Zealand

- Royal New Zealand Air Force

Nicaragua

- Nicaraguan Air Force

Nigeria
Norway

- Royal Norwegian Air Force

Panama

- Panamanian Public Forces

Paraguay

- Paraguayan Air Force: One DHC-3 donated by Argentina.

Philippines
Tanzania

- Tanzanian Air Force

United Kingdom

- Royal Air Force

United States

- United States Air Force
- United States Army
- United States Navy
  - Otter NU-1B is the oldest aircraft in the U.S. Navy, in service at the U.S. Naval Test Pilot School, Patuxent River, Md.

== Civil operators ==
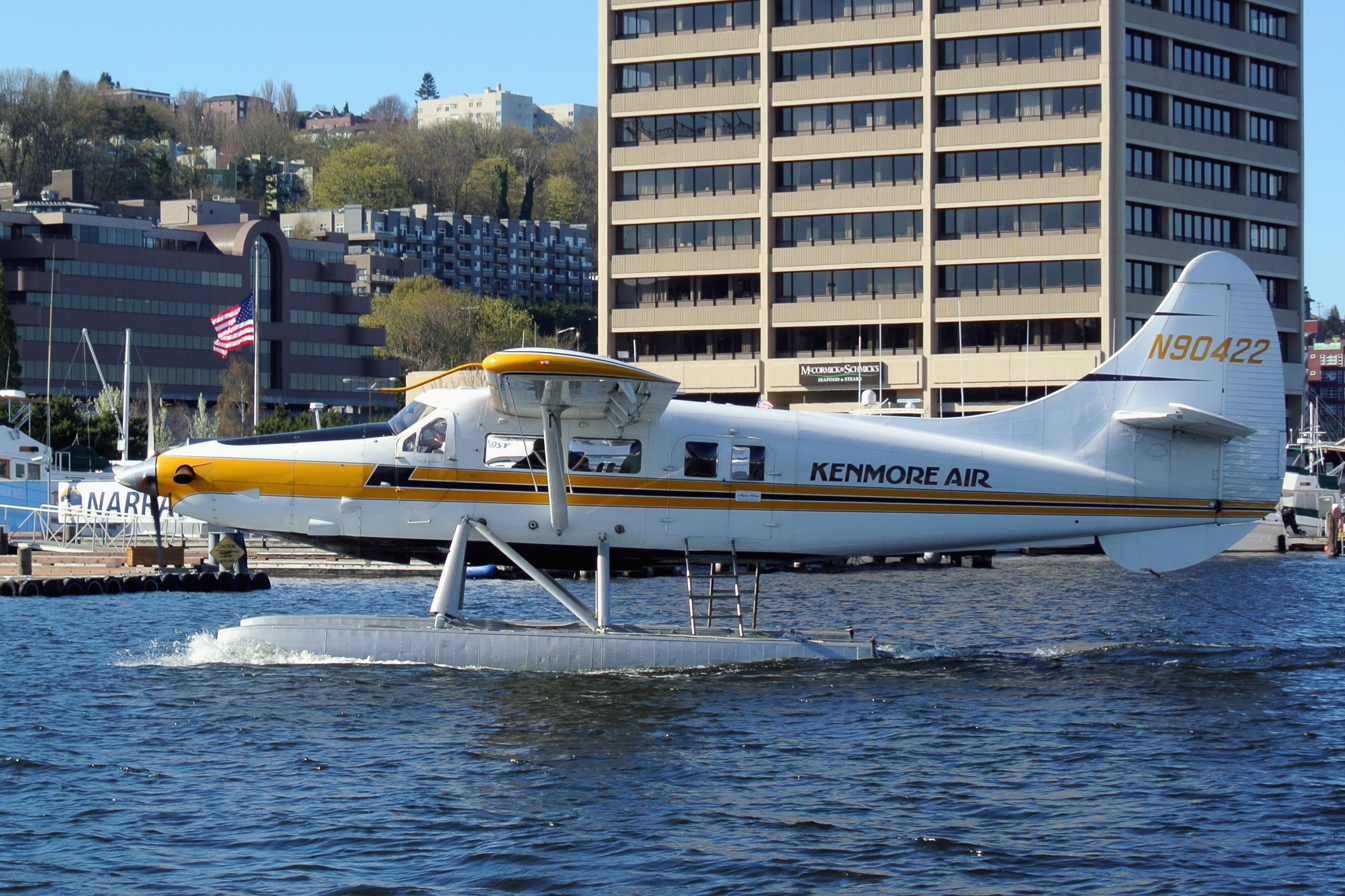
DHC-3-T Turbo Otter on Lake Union, Seattle, WA

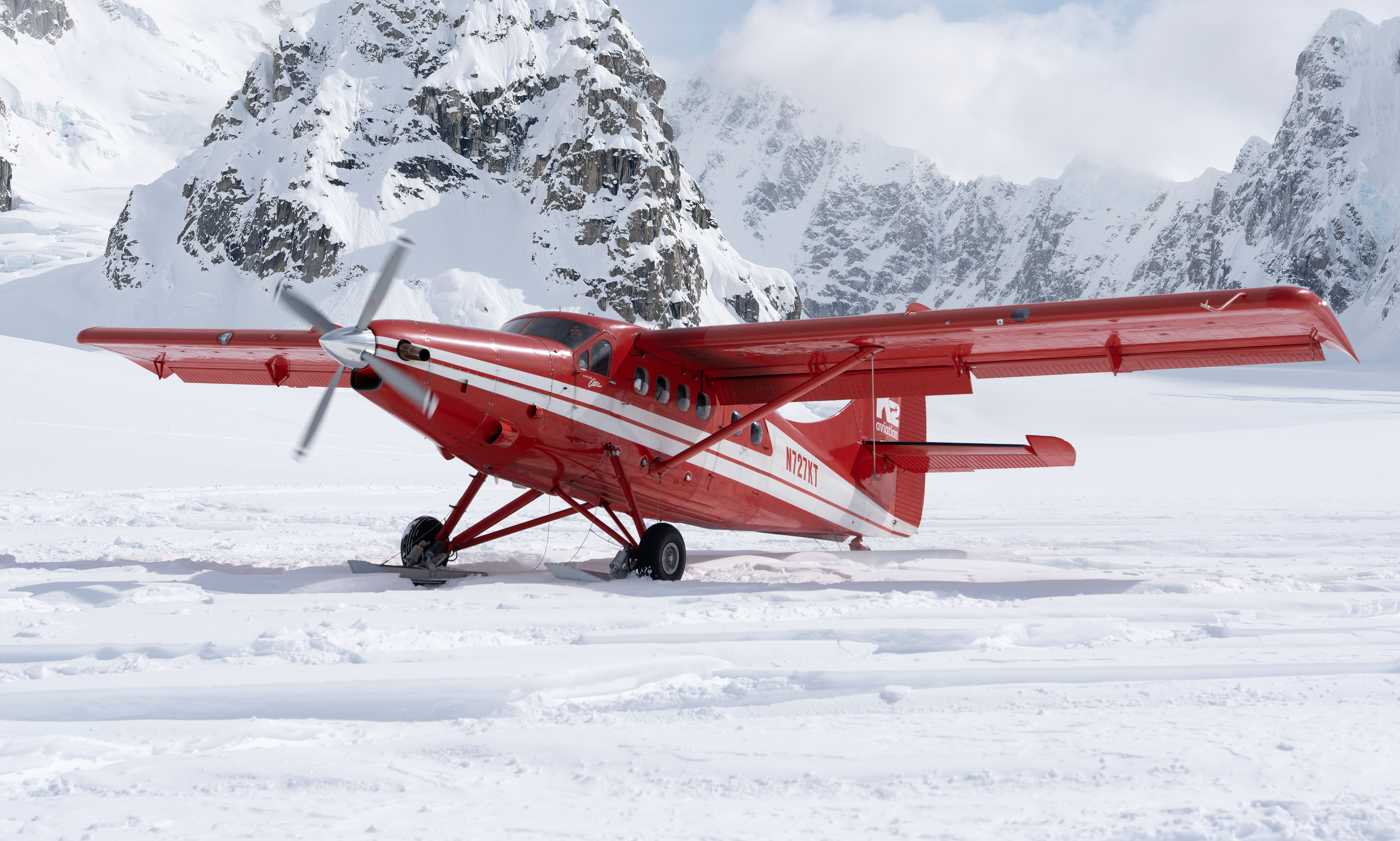
DHC-3-T Turbo Otter at Denali Base Camp, Alaska

Australia

- Qantas
- Trans Australia Airlines

Canada

- Royal Canadian Mounted Police
- Lamb Air
- Harbour Air
- Osprey Wings Ltd
- Provincial Airlines
- Air Saguenay (formerly)
- Air Tunilik
- Air Tindi
- Vancouver Island Air
- Bearskin Airlines (formerly)

Fiji

- Pacific Island Air

Indonesia

- Merpati Nusantara Airlines (formerly)

New Zealand

- Volcanic Air (Rotorua)

Norway

- Fjellfly
- Varangfly
- Westwing A/S
- Widerøe

Philippines

- Philippine Airlines (formerly)

United States

- Talkeetna Air Taxi
- Kenmore Air
- Wings Airways
- Key West Seaplane Adventures
- Northwest Seaplanes

== Accidents ==
As of June 2019, there have been 119 incidents and accidents involving the DHC-3 resulting in 242 deaths. Listed below are a select few of the most notable ones.

- In 1956, two military Otters broke up in mid-air. One had taken off from Downsview and the other from Goose Bay. The Otter requires immediate use of elevator trim to counteract the strong change in pitch caused by the retraction or extension of the flaps. Investigators found that metal contamination in a hydraulic valve allowed the flaps to rapidly retract with the tailplane still fully trimmed, and the consequent nose drop was severe enough to cause structural failure. A filter was added to the flap hydraulic system and an interconnection added between the flaps and tailplane to maintain proper trim as the flaps are operated.
- On 20 May 1964, Philippines Airlines Flight F26, a DHC-3 Otter, PI-C51, crashed into a hill when flying at VFR at Subico Point, killing all 11 on board.
- On 24 March 1986, a DHC-3 Otter floatplane, C-FAGM, of Labrador Airways, crashed while returning to Goose Bay Airport from a trip to Snegamook Lake to retrieve a group of partridge hunters. On the return trip, the aircraft encountered engine trouble. The pilot, Howard Mercer, who was the president of Goose Bay Air Services, called dispatch to report the engine running rough. As the aircraft neared Nipishish Lake, 47 miles north of Goose Bay, the pilot reported experiencing engine problems again, and that he would follow the Crooked River towards the airport as a precautionary measure for if an emergency landing was needed. Three minutes later, the pilot called dispatch to inform them he would be making an emergency landing on the river due to a smoke odour in the cockpit. The aircraft never made it. Due to whiteout conditions and the frozen surface of the river, when the pilot flew close to the ground to land, the wing struck the ground and the aircraft broke apart and was subsequently engulfed in flames. Three passengers and the pilot were killed, while one passenger survived the crash with serious injuries.
- On 22 June 1994, a DHC-3 Otter floatplane, N13GA, registered to and operated by Wings of Alaska of Juneau, Alaska, crashed into the Taku Inlet, 12 miles east of Juneau. The air taxi flight had departed the Taku Lodge located on the Taku River bound for the Juneau downtown dock. Instrument meteorological conditions prevailed at the time of the accident. Six passengers were killed, one passenger was missing and presumed dead, and the pilot and three passengers received serious injuries. The National Transportation Safety Board (NTSB) attributed the accident to continued VFR into IMC and the pilot's consequent failure to maintain altitude above the water surface.
- On 9 August 2010, a DHC-3T registered to Anchorage-based GCI crashed about 17 miles (27 km) north of Dillingham, Alaska, while en route to a private fishing lodge. Five of the nine people on board were killed, including former Alaska Senator Ted Stevens. Surviving passengers included former NASA administrator Sean O'Keefe and his teenage son, both of whom sustained injuries.
- On 23 September 2011, a DHC-3T Turbine Otter floatplane, N361TT, sustained substantial damage during a go-around and subsequent low-altitude maneuver at Heitman Lake, about 5 miles south-southwest of Kodiak, Alaska, killing the pilot and injuring the two passengers. One of the passengers reported that during the go-around, the airplane struck a tree on the shoreline and crashed.
- On 7 July 2013, a DHC-3 Otter registered to Rediske Air, N93PC, crashed on takeoff at Soldotna Airport, Alaska, killing all ten aboard. There were no surviving witnesses and the aircraft did not carry a flight data recorder, but the NTSB was able to reconstruct the aircraft's flight path using a recovered mobile phone video recorded by a passenger. The NTSB attributed the accident to a stall caused by the operator's failure to weigh cargo and verify that the aircraft was loaded within its center of gravity limits.
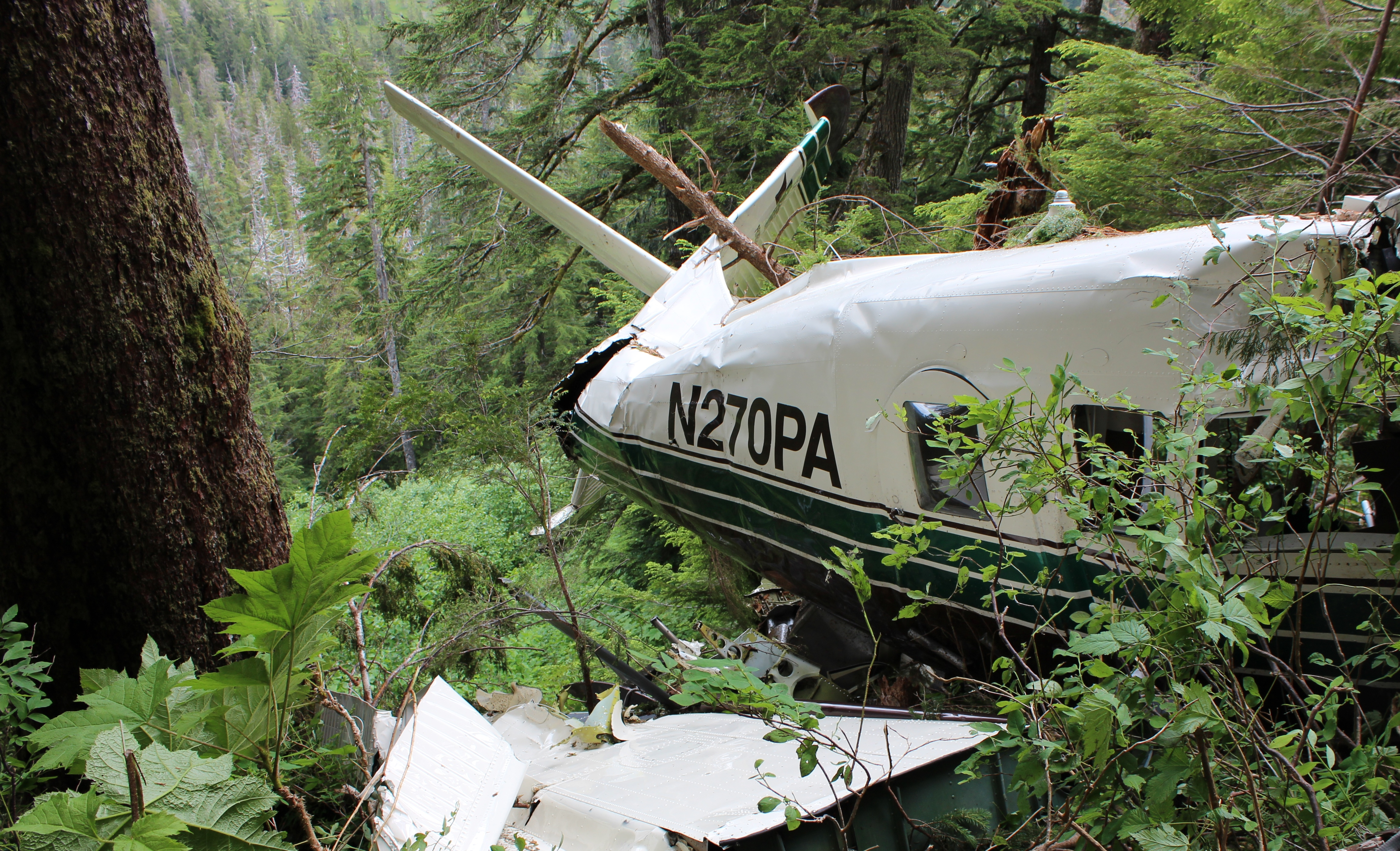
- Debris of 2015 Promech Air crash near Ketchikan, Alaska
  On 25 June 2015, a Promech Air DHC-3 Otter crashed into the face of a granite cliff near Ella Lake, Alaska, 20 miles (32 km) northeast of Ketchikan. The aircraft carried a pilot and eight passengers who were tourists on a sightseeing excursion from a Holland America Line coastal cruise aboard the cruise ship MS Westerdam. All nine people on board died. The NTSB determined that the pilot had a history of poor decision making and that the company had a compromised culture that resulted in an "operation in which safety competed with performance and revenue".
- On 15 September 2015, a DHC-3 Turbine Otter floatplane carrying ten people and belonging to Rainbow King Lodge crashed on takeoff at Eastwind Lake, 1 mi (1.6 km) mile north of Iliamna, 175 mi (282 km) southwest of Anchorage. Three people were killed in the crash.
- On 13 May 2019, in the 2019 Alaska mid-air collision, a Taquan Air DHC-3 Turbine Otter floatplane, N959PA, collided with a Mountain Air Service DHC-2 Beaver, N952DB, over George Inlet, Alaska, with the loss of one passenger aboard the DHC-3 and five passengers and crew aboard the DHC-2. The NTSB attributed the accident to "'the inherent limitations of the see-and-avoid concept, along with the absence of alerts from both airplanes' traffic display systems." Due to the angle of approach, both pilots' viewpoints were partially blocked by the aircraft structure or seated passengers. The NTSB identified Taquan's inadequate preflight checklist and the Federal Aviation Administration's failure to require Taquan to implement a safety management system as contributing factors.
- On 4 September 2022, a DHC-3 floatplane operated by Friday Harbor Seaplanes, N725TH, crashed in Puget Sound near Whidbey Island, Washington, killing all ten aboard the aircraft. On October 24, the NTSB announced that the horizontal stabilizer actuator had separated into two pieces at a threaded assembly fitting, and that the actuator lock ring was missing from the wreckage. The next day, Viking Air issued a service letter requiring DHC-3 Otter operators to inspect their aircraft and ensure that the actuator's lock ring is present.
- On 23 July 2026, Kenmore Air Flight 140, a DHC-3 Turbine Otter floatplane, N709KA, made an emergency landing and crashed into the shore of Sucia Island in the San Juan Islands. The aircraft subsequently caught fire and burned. All ten passengers and the pilot survived the crash, however several occupants suffered injuries.

== Specifications (landplane) ==
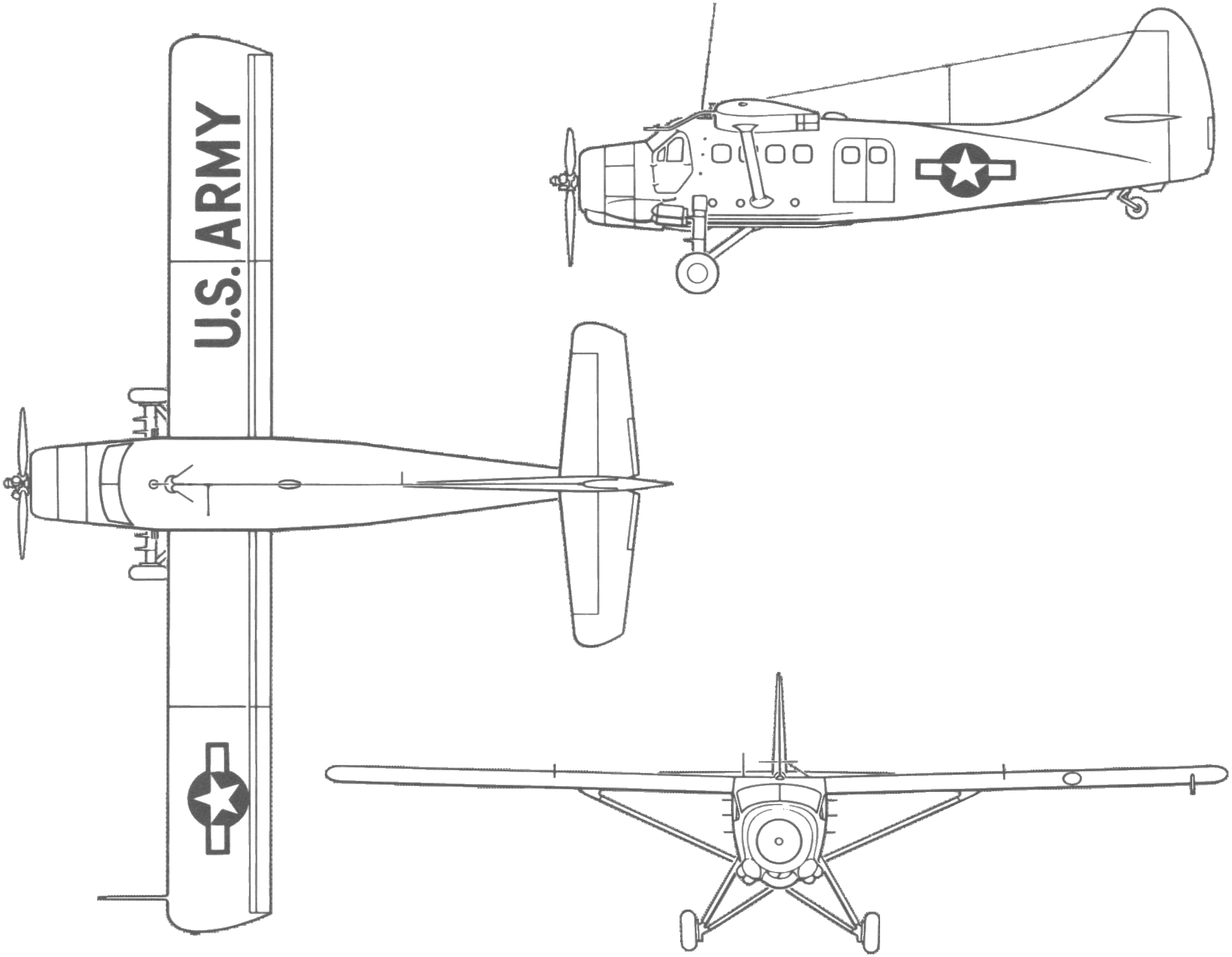
3-view line drawing of the de Havilland Canada U-1A Otter

Data from Jane's All the World's Aircraft 1958–59, Jane's Civil and Military Aircraft Upgrades 1994–95

General characteristics

- Crew: 1 or 2
- Capacity: 9–11 passengers (optional 10th seat in main cabin) / 6 stretchers with 4 seats / 2-3 stretchers with 7 seats
- Length: 41 ft 10 in (12.75 m)
- Wingspan: 58 ft 0 in (17.68 m)
- Height: 12 ft 7 in (3.84 m)

- seaplane 15 ft 0 in (5 m)

- Cabin length: 16 ft 5 in (5 m)
- Cabin width: 5 ft 2 in (2 m)
- Cabin height: 4 ft 11 in (1 m)
- Cabin volume: 272 cu ft (7.7 m^{3})
- Stowage compartment volume: 38 cu ft (1.1 m^{3})
- Wing area: 375 sq ft (34.8 m^{2})
- Aspect ratio: 8.97
- Airfoil: NACA 63A516 mod
- Empty weight: 4,108 lb (1,863 kg)

- seaplane 4,620 lb (2,096 kg)

- fixed skis 4,361 lb (1,978 kg)

- wheel/ski 4,475 lb (2,030 kg)

- Gross weight: 8,000 lb (3,629 kg)

- seaplane 7,967 lb (3,614 kg)

- Fuel capacity: Total fuel 178 imp gal (214 US gal; 809 L) in :- 51 imp gal (61 US gal; 232 L) front tank ; 85 imp gal (102 US gal; 386 L) middle tank group (two cells) ; 42 imp gal (50 US gal; 191 L) rear tank
- Powerplant: 1 × Pratt & Whitney R-1340-S1H1-G Wasp 9-cylinder air-cooled radial piston engine, 600 hp (450 kW)

or -S3H1-G (lower supercharger gearing)

- Propellers: 3-bladed Hamilton Standard, 10 ft 10 in (3.30 m) diameter constant-speed propeller

Performance

- Maximum speed: 160 mph (260 km/h, 140 kn) at 5,000 ft (1,524 m)

- seaplane 153 mph (133 kn; 246 km/h) at 5,000 ft (1,524 m)

- skiplane 158 mph (137 kn; 254 km/h) at 5,000 ft (1,524 m)

- Cruise speed: 138 mph (222 km/h, 120 kn) 66% power at 5,000 ft (1,524 m)

- seaplane 129 mph (112 kn; 208 km/h) at 5,000 ft (1,524 m)

- skiplane 133 mph (116 kn; 214 km/h) at 5,000 ft (1,524 m)

- Range: 960 mi (1,540 km, 830 nmi) full internal fuel at 5,000 ft (1,524 m)

- seaplane 863 mi (750 nmi; 1,389 km) full internal fuel at 5,000 ft (1,524 m) seaplane

- Endurance: 9 hours 24 minutes at 5,000 ft (1,524 m)

- seaplane 8 hours 54 minutes at 5,000 ft (1,524 m)

- Service ceiling: 18,800 ft (5,700 m) S1H1-G engine

- 17,400 ft (5,304 m) S3H1-G engine

- Seaplane

- 17,900 ft (5,456 m) seaplane S1H1-G engine
- 16,400 ft (4,999 m) seaplane S3H1-G engine
- Skiplane

- 18,600 ft (5,669 m) skiplane S1H1-G engine
- 17,100 ft (5,212 m) skiplane S3H1-G engine

- Rate of climb: 735 ft/min (3.73 m/s) at sea level

- seaplane 650 ft/min (3.3 m/s) at sea level

- skiplane 690 ft/min (3.5 m/s) at sea level

- Take-off distance to 50 ft (15 m): 1,310 ft (399 m)

- seaplane 1,980 ft (604 m)

- Landing distance from 50 ft (15 m): 975 ft (297 m)

- seaplane 1,510 ft (460 m)

== See also ==
- de Havilland Canada DHC-2 Beaver

Related development

- de Havilland Canada DHC-6 Twin Otter

Aircraft of comparable role, configuration, and era

- Antonov An-2
- Cessna 208 Caravan
- PAC P-750 XSTOL
- Pilatus PC-6 Porter
- Quest Kodiak
- Sherpa Aircraft Sherpa

Related lists

- Bush plane
- List of civil aircraft
- List of non-carrier aircraft flown from aircraft carriers
- STOL
