= List of Douglas C-47 Skytrain operators =

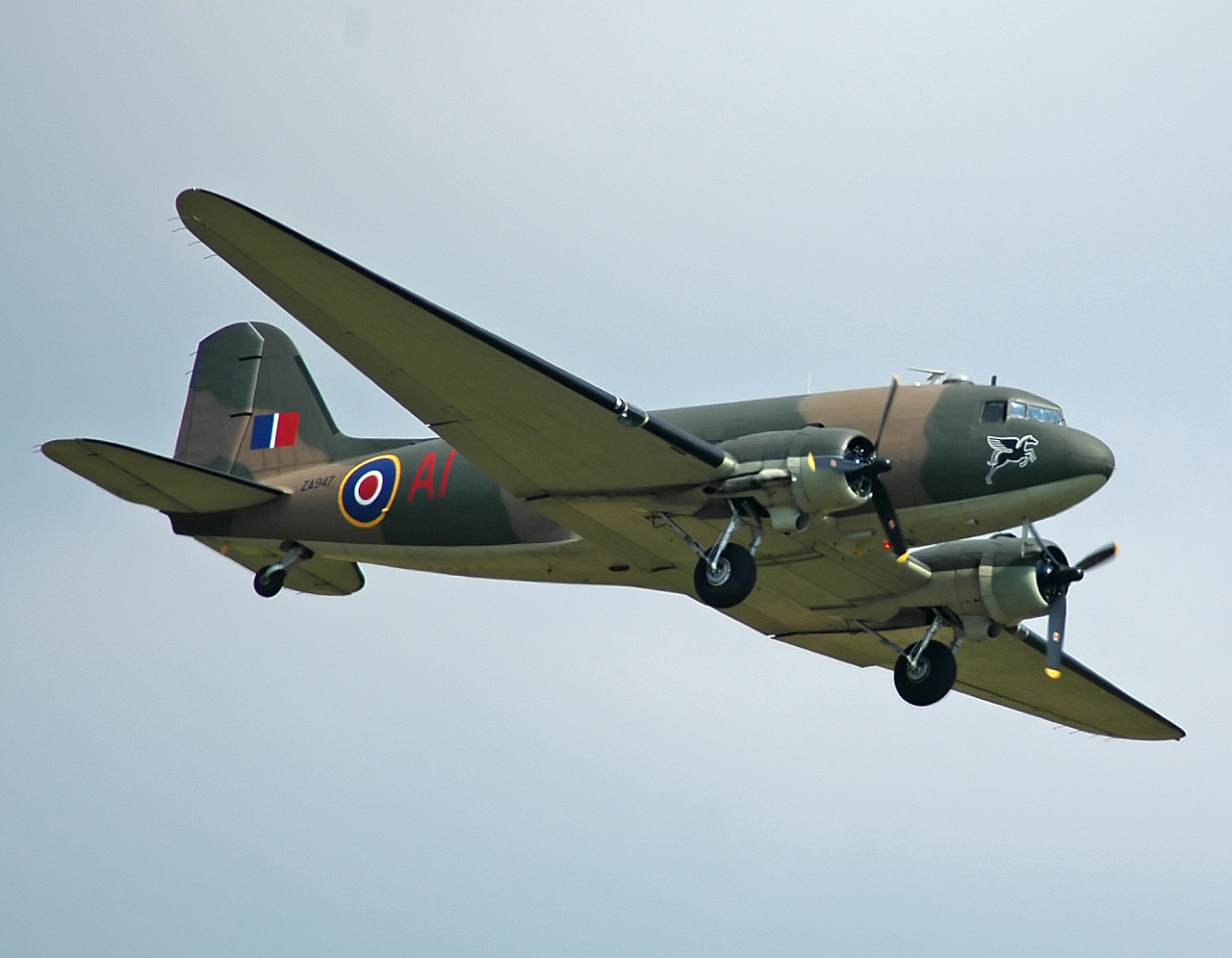
Royal Air Force Dakota III

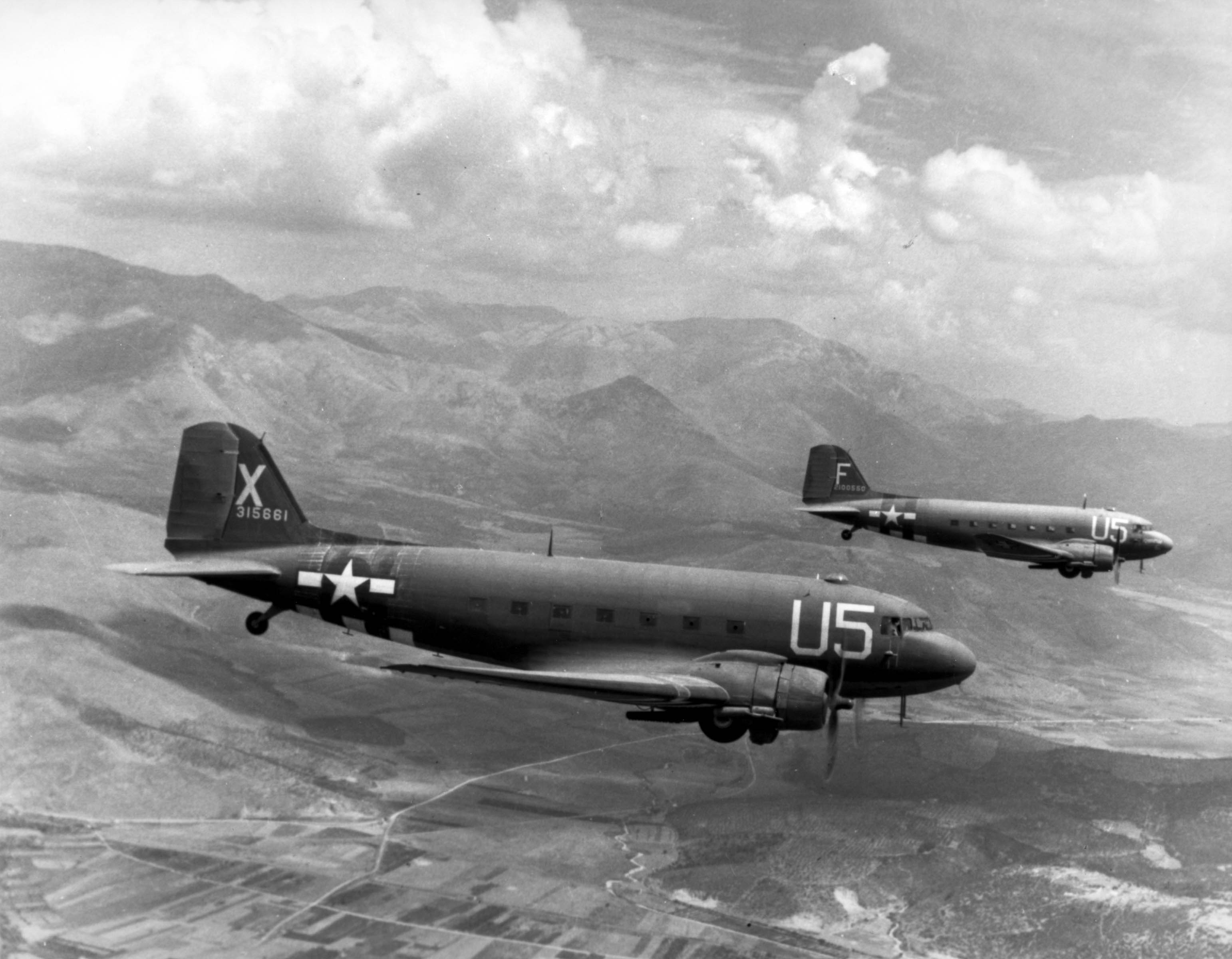
Two USAAF C-47A Skytrains over France, 1944

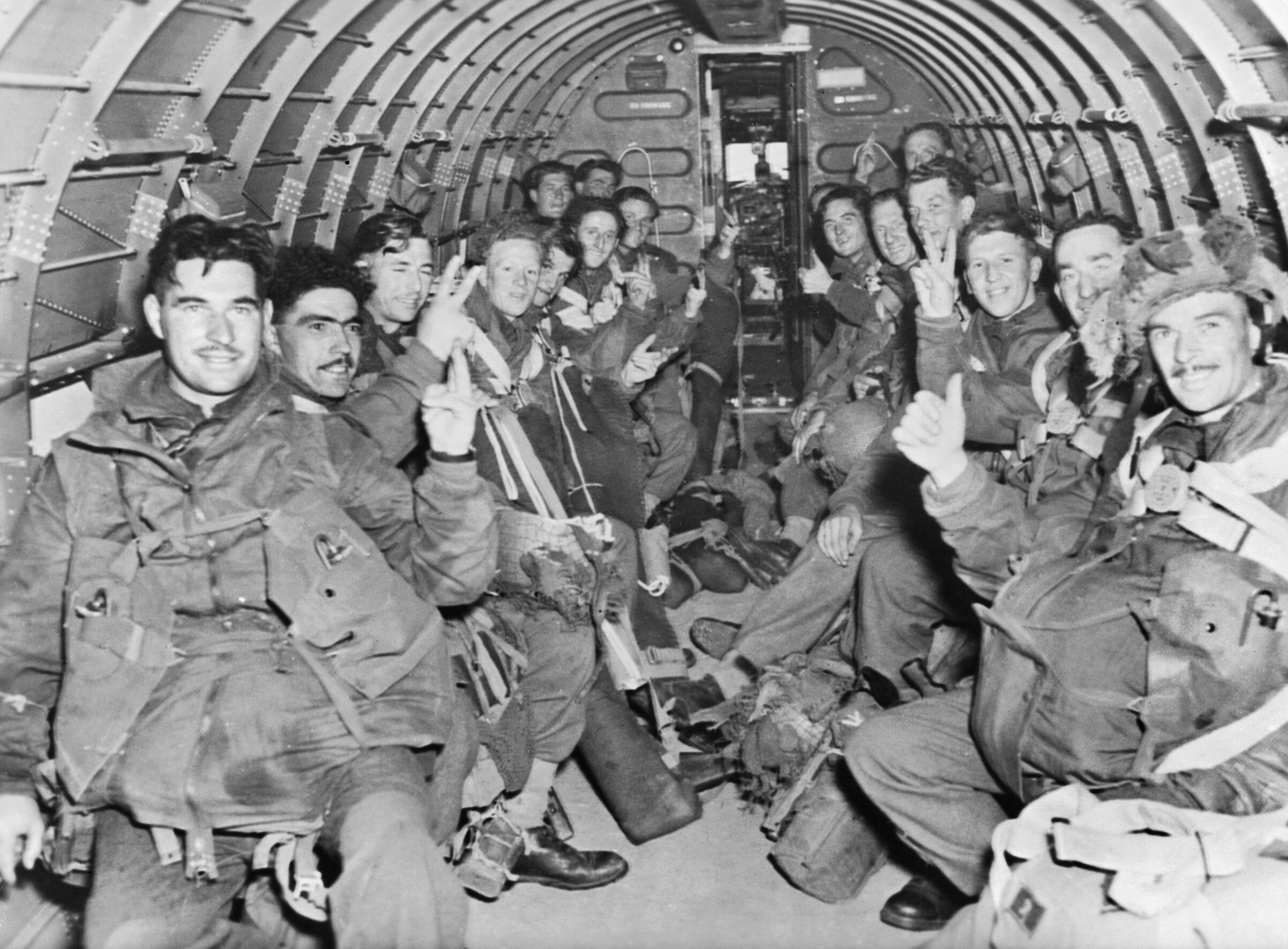
British paratroops inside C-47 Dakota, 1944

List of C-47 Skytrain operators includes the country, military service, known squadrons, and related data. The Skytrain or Dakota is a military transport that was developed from the Douglas DC-3 airliner. The C-47 has served with over 90 countries outside of the United States:

== Operators ==
=== Current operators ===
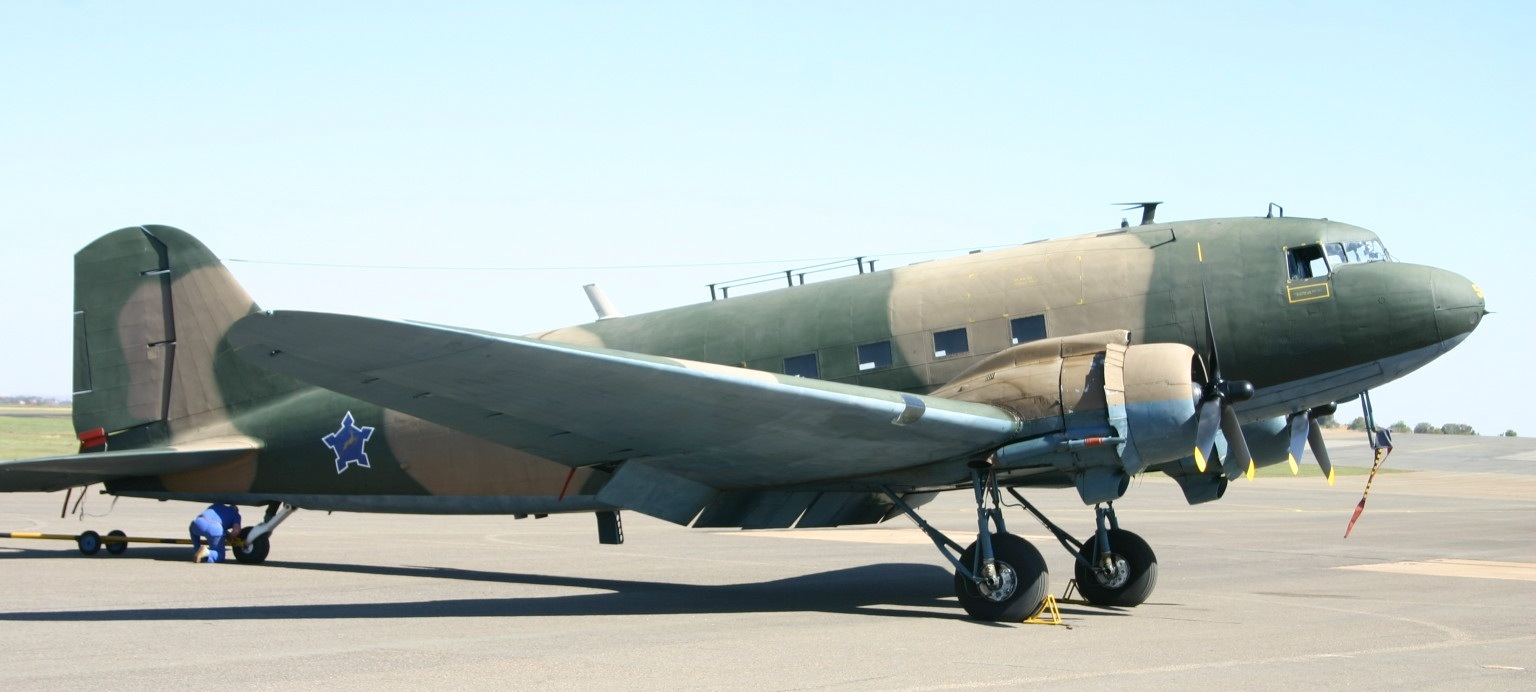
Douglas Dakota 6859, South African Air Force, 2008

==== Bolivia ====
- Bolivian Air Force

==== Colombia ====
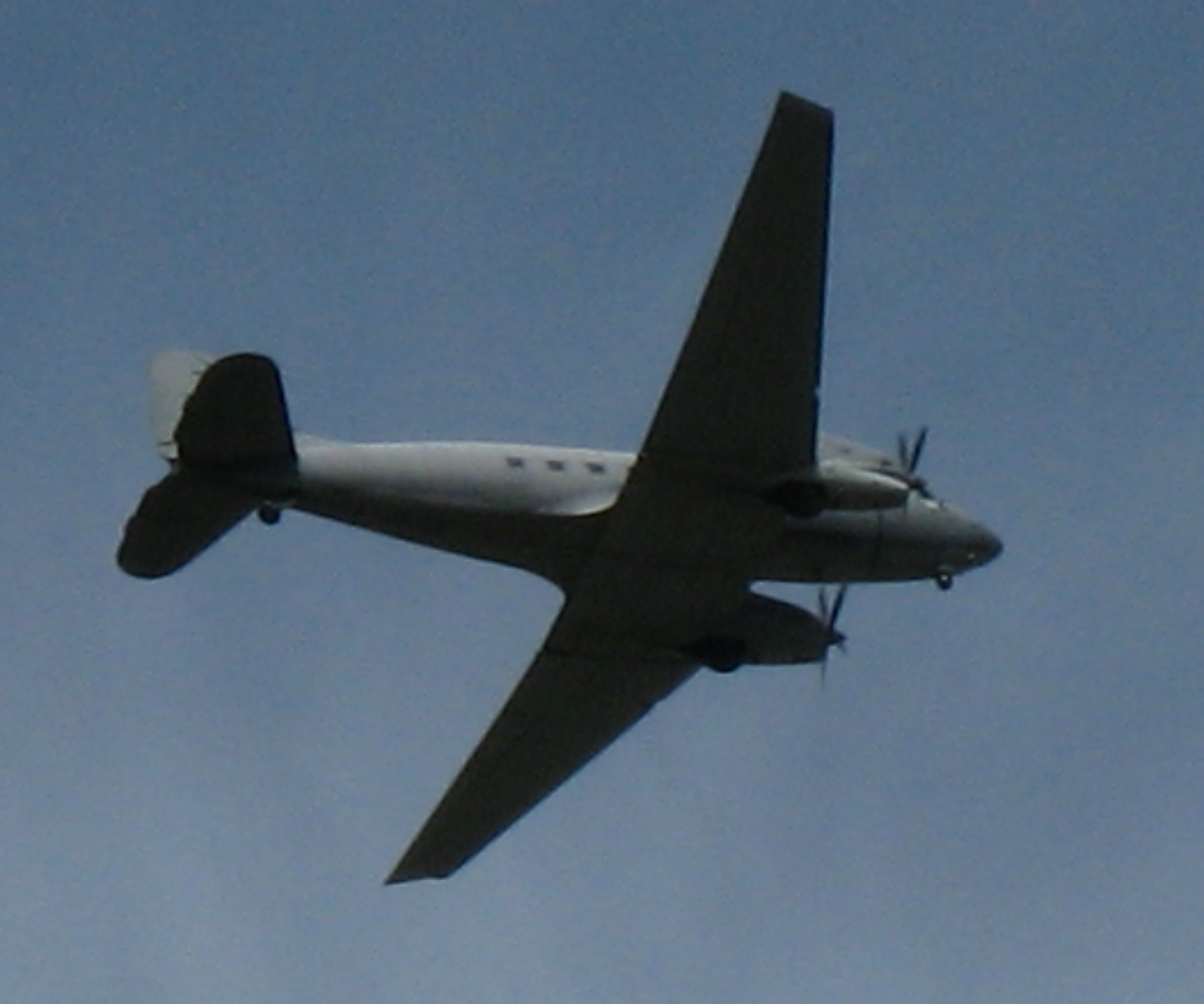
Colombian Air Force AC-47 Fantasma, 2008

- Colombian Air Force

==== El Salvador ====
- Salvadoran Air Force

==== Guatemala ====
- Guatemalan Air Force

==== Malawi ====
- Malawi Air Force

==== Mali ====
- Mali Air Force

==== Mauritania ====
- Mauritania Islamic Air Force – started operating one C-47 donated by France in 1960. Five additional aircraft were bought from France in the first half of the 1960s. Currently operates one Basler BT-67.

==== South Africa ====
- South African Air Force
  - 35 Squadron SAAF: Still in use, flying the Turbo Dakota

==== Thailand ====
- Royal Thai Air Force

=== Former operators ===
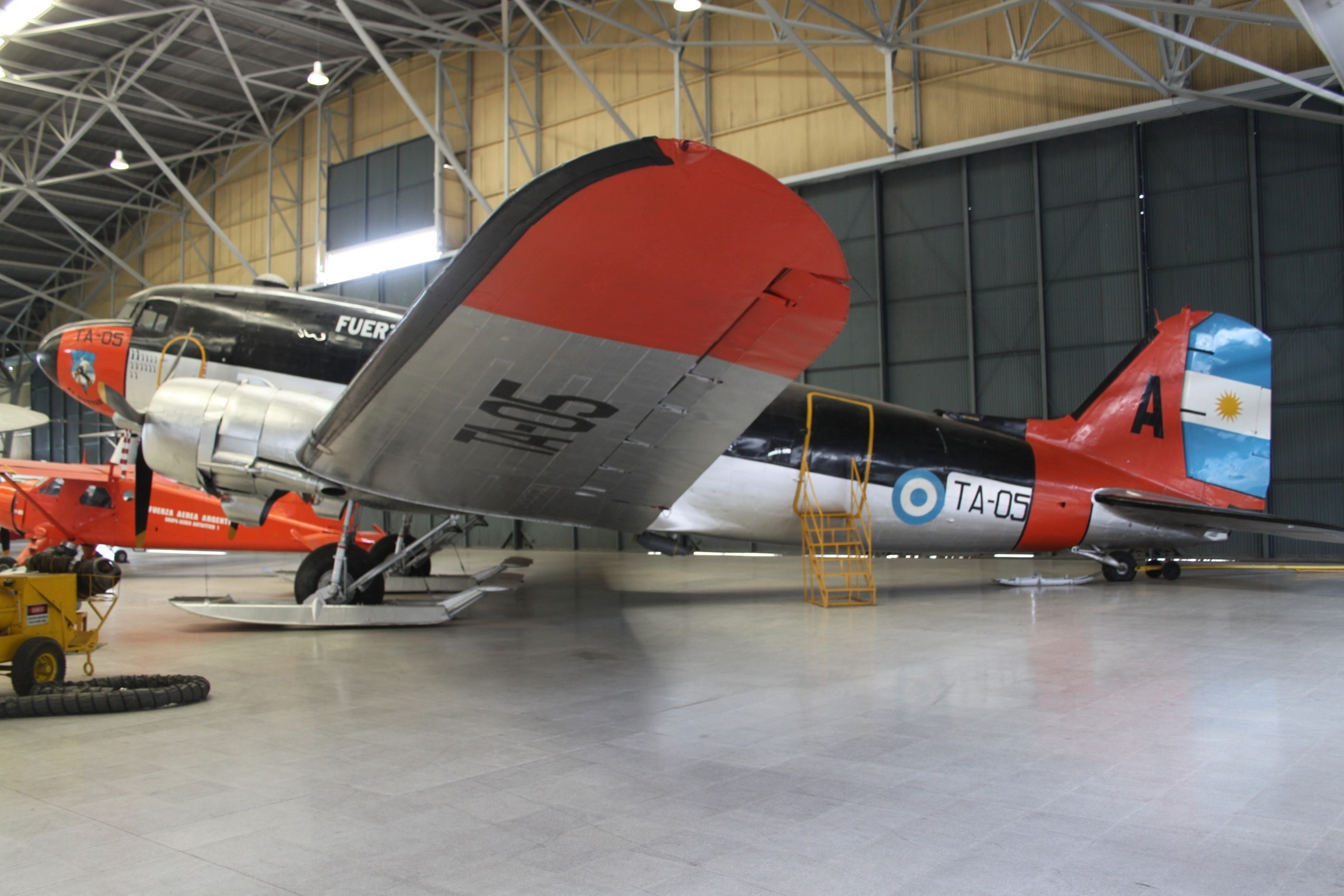
Argentine Air Force TA-05

==== Argentina ====
- Argentine Air Force – 55 (DC-3 and C-47)
- Argentine Army Aviation
- Argentine Naval Aviation – 13 (4 DC-3, 9 C-47) ex US
- Argentine Naval Prefecture

==== Australia ====
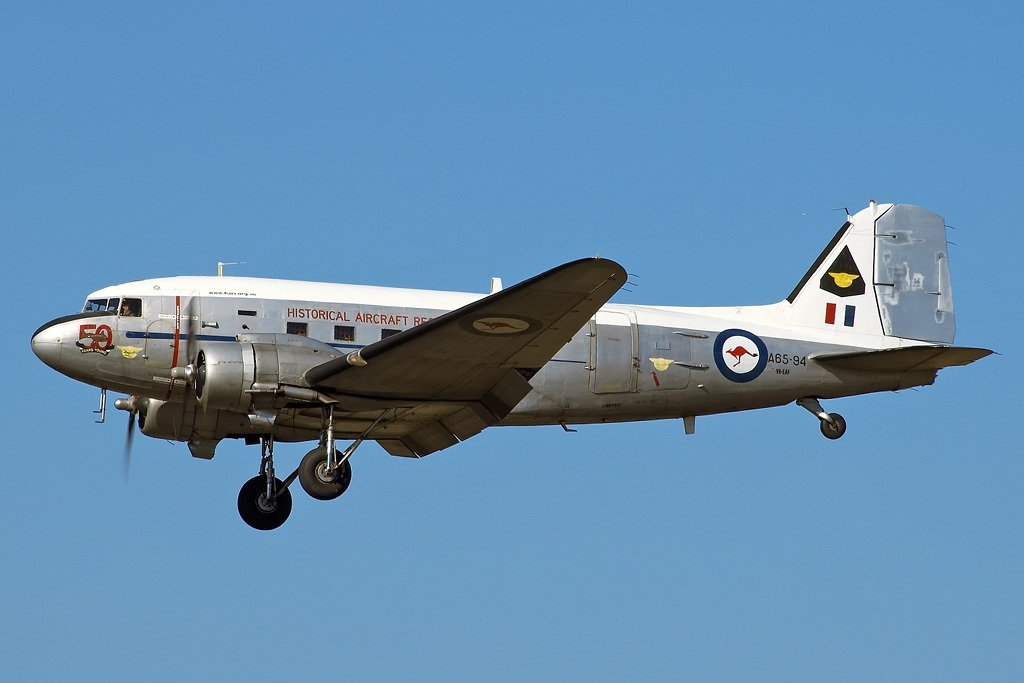
Douglas C-47B, ex-RAAF A65-94, 2005

- Royal Australian Air Force
  - The RAAF impressed civil DC-3s in September 1939 at the outbreak of World War II. The first C-47s were delivered in 1942 under Lend-Lease and the first built specifically for the RAAF entered service in February 1943. RAAF had received 124 by 1945 which were used during World War II, the Korean War the Malayan Emergency and in Occupied Japan. Most were transferred to civilian government agencies in Australia and New Guinea or sold to airlines in the 1960s. 7 were transferred to Papua New Guinea Defence Force in 1973. A handful survived in RAAF service into the 1990s with the last two (A65-94 and A65-95) being retired from the Aircraft Research and Development Unit in March 1999. These two are now operated by the Historical Aircraft Restoration Society.
  - No. 8 Squadron RAAF
  - No. 33 Squadron RAAF
  - No. 34 Squadron RAAF
  - No. 35 Squadron RAAF
  - No. 36 Squadron RAAF
  - No. 37 Squadron RAAF
  - No. 38 Squadron RAAF
- Royal Australian Navy
  - Four ex-RAAF aircraft were transferred to the RAN post-war.
    - 723 Squadron RAN
    - 724 Squadron RAN
    - 725 Squadron RAN
    - 851 Squadron RAN

==== Bangladesh ====
- Bangladesh Air Force – all retired.

==== Belgium ====
- Belgian Air Force - 41 used. In service from 1946 to 1976.

==== Benin ====
- Benin Air Force - At least 5 operated.

==== Brazil ====
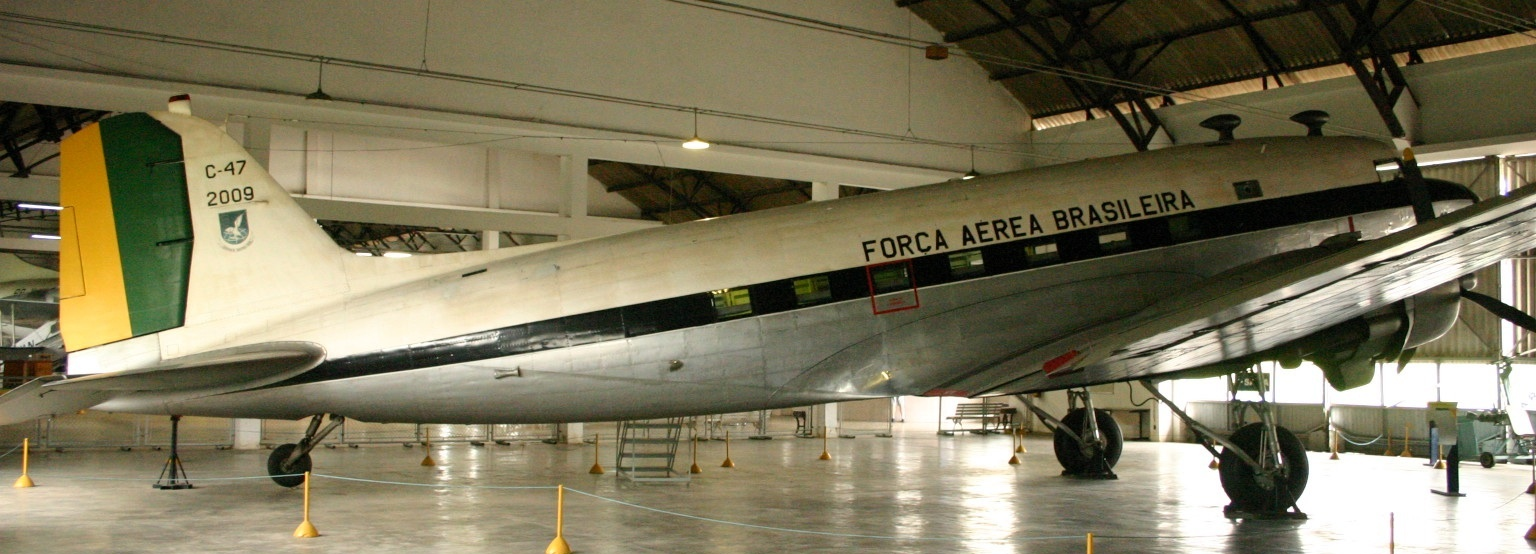
Forca Aerea Brasileira Douglas C-47, at Museu Aeroespacial

- Brazilian Air Force
- Real Transportes Aéreos

==== Burma ====
- Union of Burma Air Force

==== Cambodia ====
- Royal Cambodian Air Force
  - Received ex-RAAF C-47s as foreign aid.

==== Cameroon ====
- Cameroon Air Force - received six C-47s from 1960.

==== Canada ====
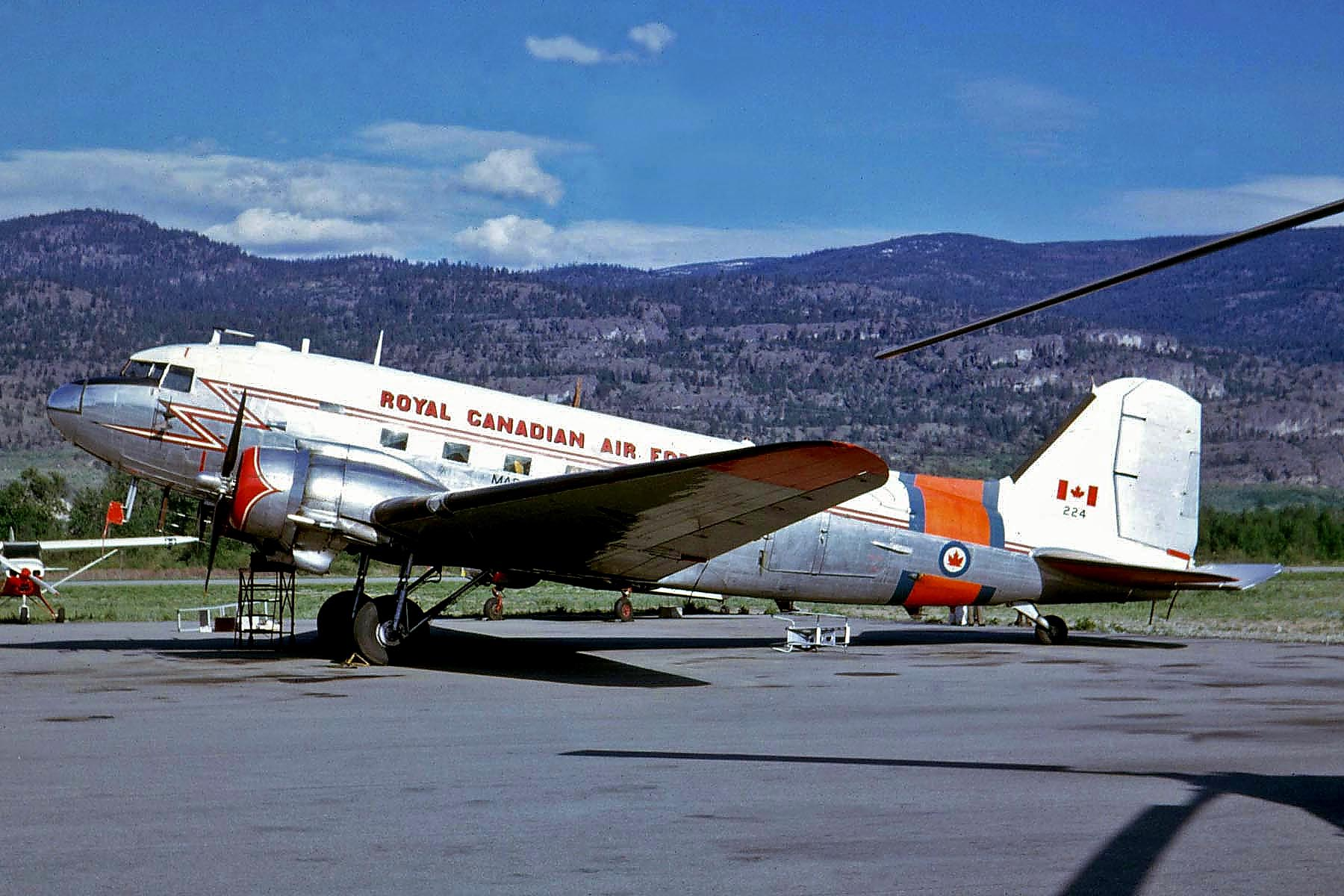
C-47 RCAF YYF, 1967

- Buffalo Airways
- Canadian Coast Guard – operated by Transport Canada
- Canadian Forces
- Environment Canada (ex-CAF)
- Royal Canadian Air Force Last served with 402 Squadron in Winnipeg and was retired in 1988.
  - 103 Search and Rescue Squadron
- Royal Canadian Navy
  - VU-32 Squadron

==== Central African Republic ====
- Central African Republic Air Force

==== Chad ====
- Chadian Air Force

==== Chile ====
- Chilean Air Force
- Chilean Navy

==== Comoros ====
- Army of National Development

==== Congo Republic ====
- Congolese Air Force

==== Czechoslovakia ====
- Czechoslovak Air Force operated C-47s and Soviet-built Li-2.

==== Denmark ====
- Royal Danish Air Force

==== Ethiopia ====
- Ethiopian Air Force

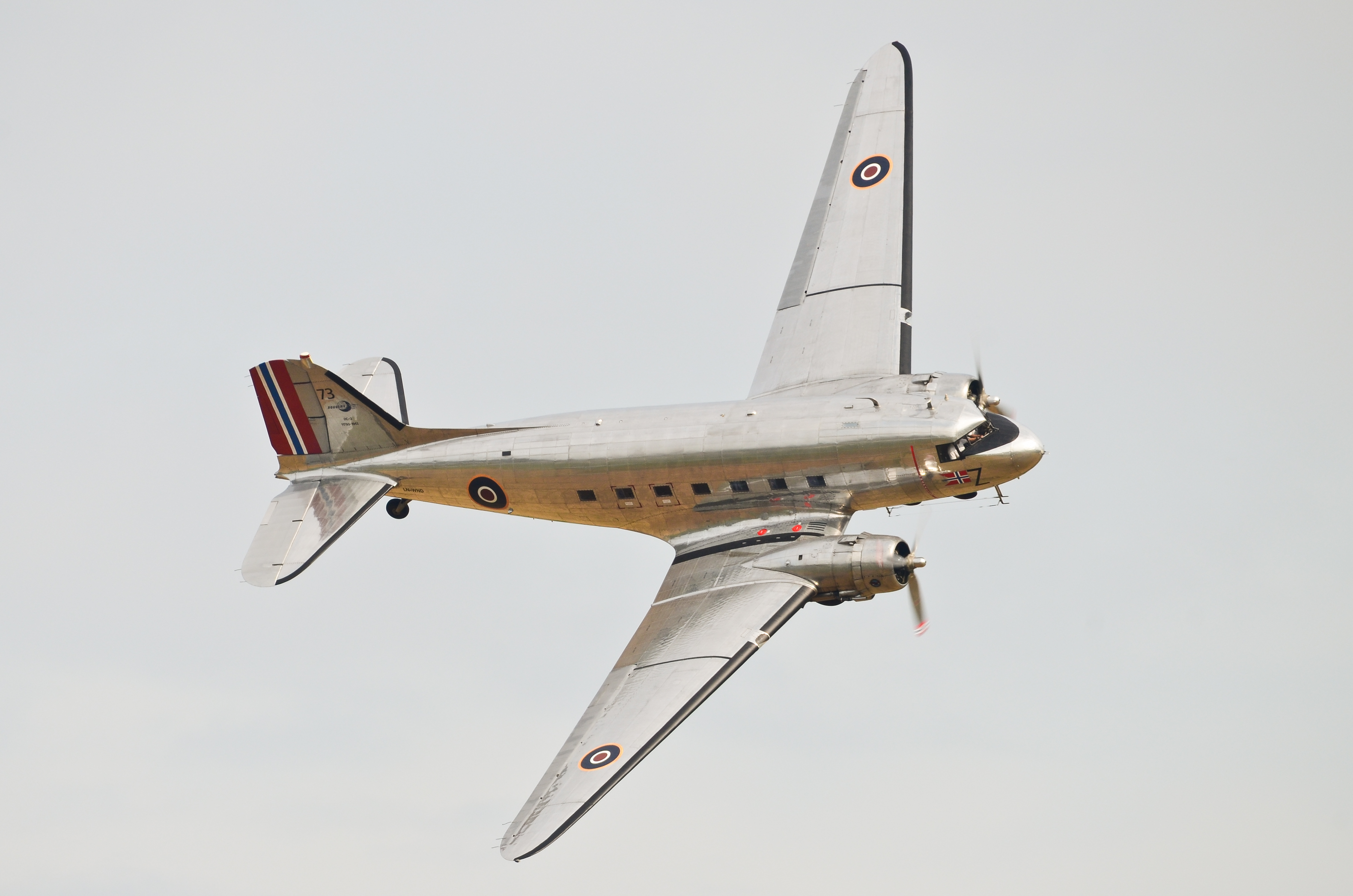
This 1943 C-47 served as the President of Finland's official airplane in the 1970s, as Finnish Air Force DO-9.

==== Finland ====
- The Finnish Air Force operated nine from 1960 to 1984. One was involved in the Finnish Air Force's deadliest crash on 3 October 1978, when the aircraft crashed soon after takeoff, killing all 15 aboard.

==== France ====
- The French Air Force operated Skytrains from September 1944 on, when Lend-Lease C-47Bs were delivered to the Groupe de Transport 1/15. After the war, they were the only transport aircraft in large numbers with the Junkers 52 until the late 1950s.
- The French Navy used an example in the First Indochina War as a transport aircraft. After some were used as training aircraft by the squadron 56S.

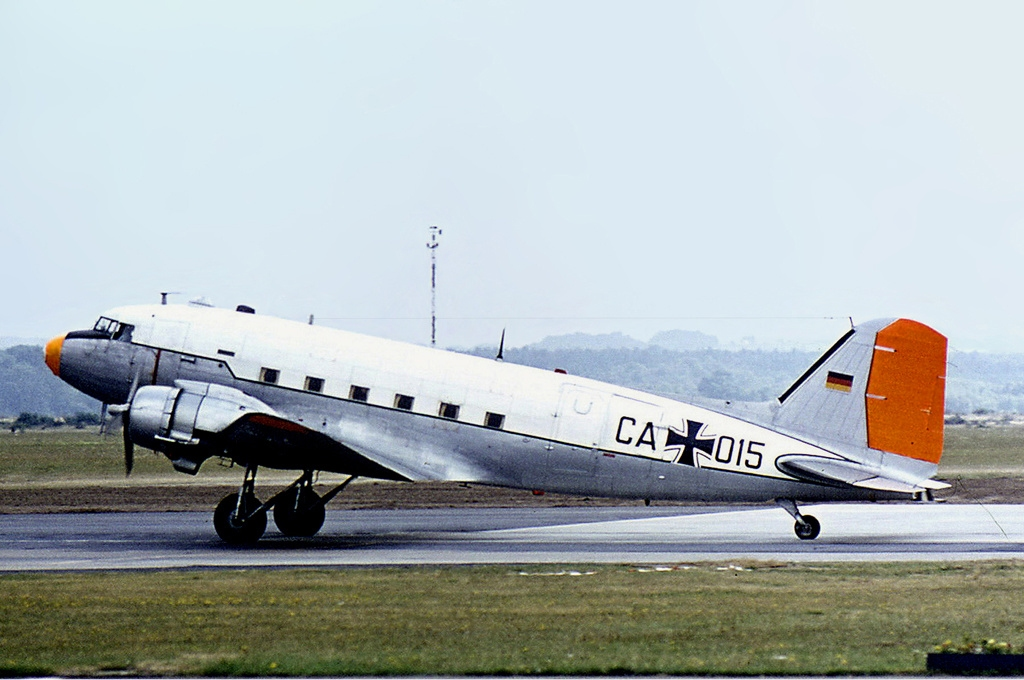
Luftwaffe Douglas C-47B Skytrain .

==== Germany ====
- 20 used by the post-war West German Luftwaffe

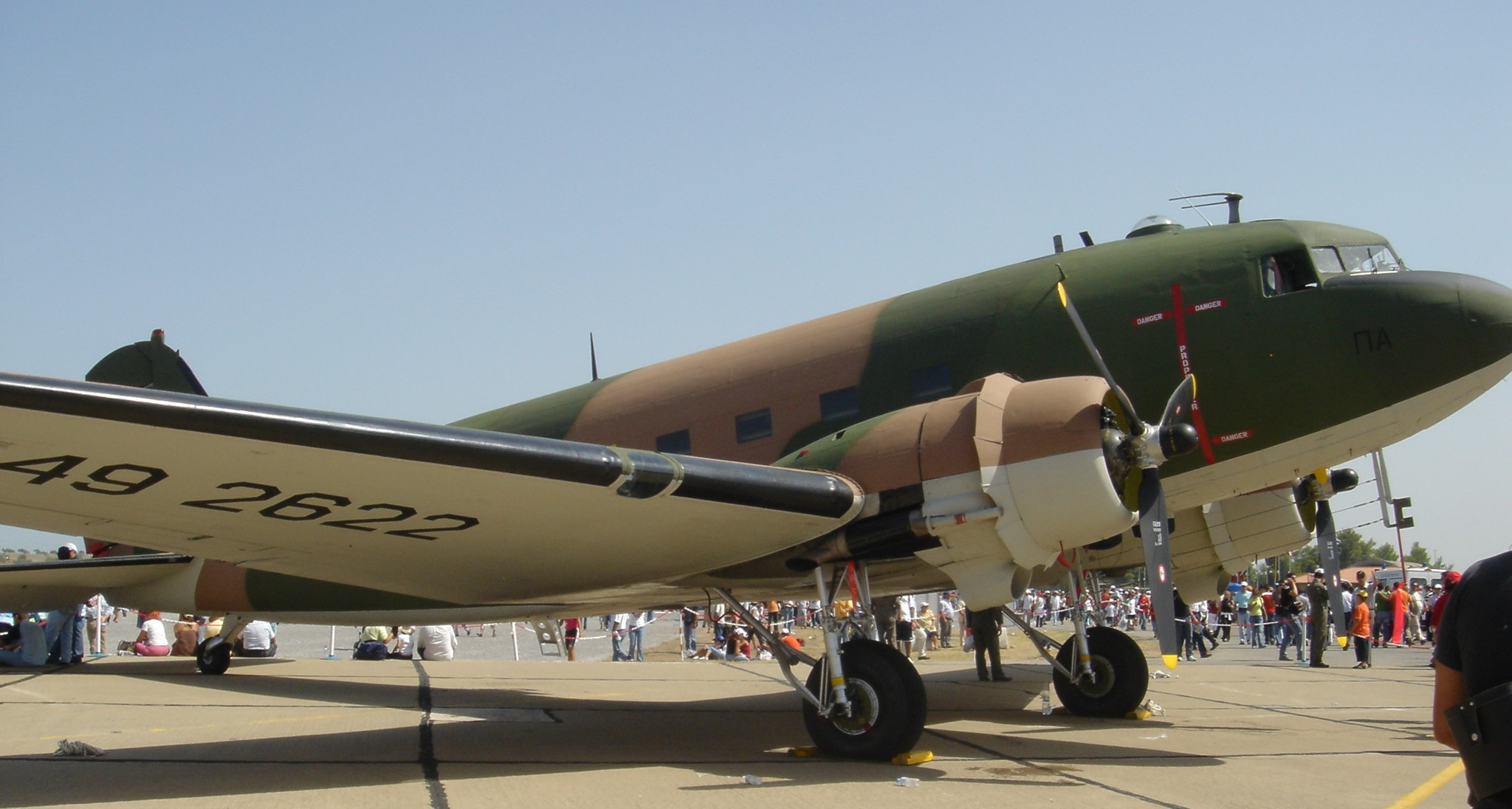
The single operational C-47 of the Hellenic Air Force.

==== Greece ====
The Hellenic Air Force's received a total of 78 aircraft, in several batches, with 26 ex-RAF Dakota IVs received from 1947 to 1949, 16 ex-USAAF C-47s in 1947–48, 30 C-47s supplied from the US under the Mutual Assistance Program and six aircraft from Olympic Airways in 1963. They equipped the 355th and 356th Transport Squadrons. These were widely used in the Greek Civil War (1946–49) in transport and bombing roles. The 13th Transport Flight used C-47s in the Korean War, earning a U.S. Presidential Citation. The 356th Squadron converted to the Lockheed C-130 Hercules in 1975, but 26 C-47s remained operational with 355 Squadron at the beginning of the 1980s, with aircraft gradually being phased out over time, with four aircraft remaining operational in 2000 and the last aircraft, a veteran of the Korean War, grounded in 2008.

==== Haiti ====
- Haiti Air Corps

==== Honduras ====
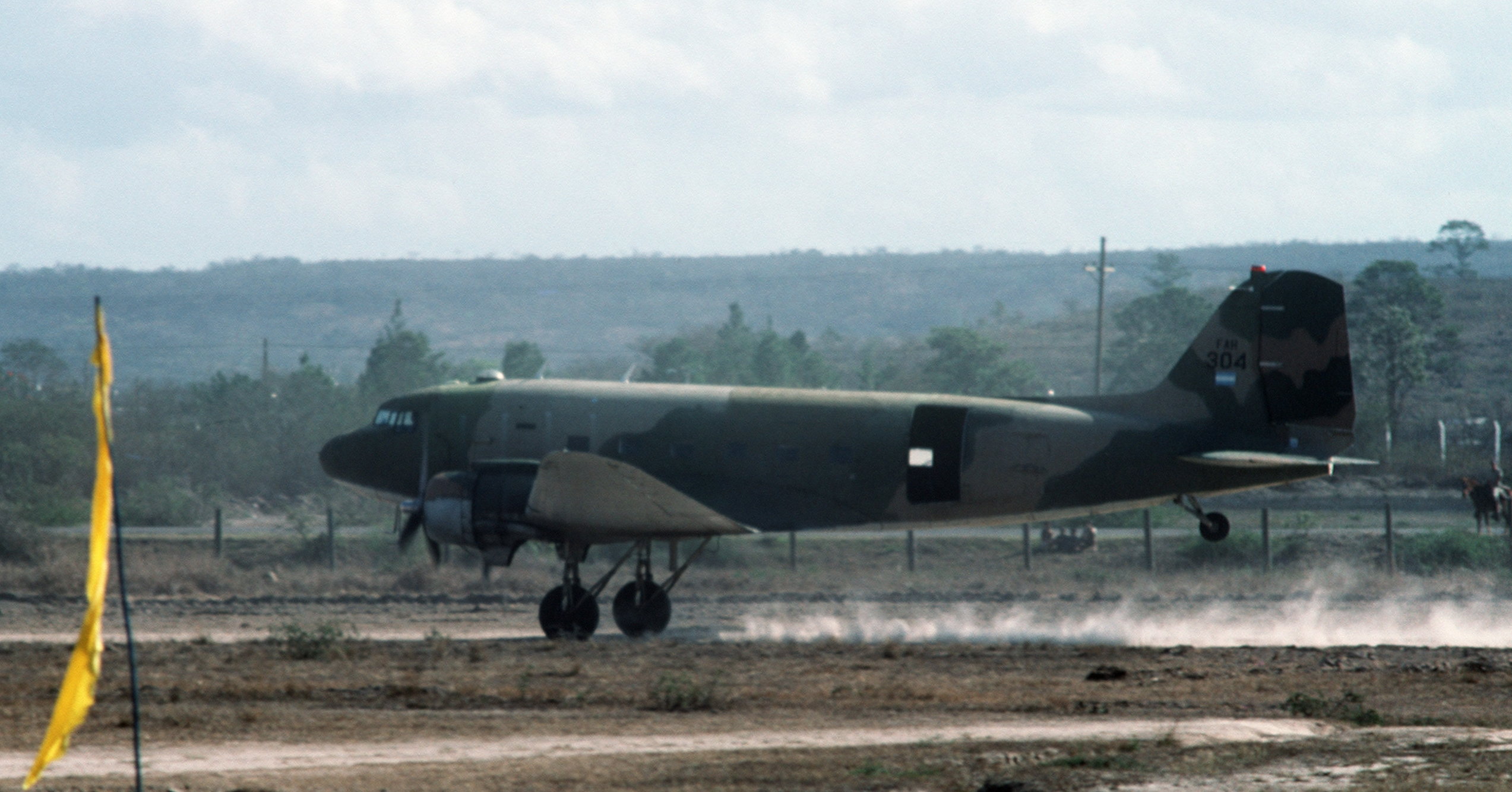
A Honduran Douglas C-47A-20-DK Skytrain aircraft (FAH 304, c/n 12962, ex-USAF 42-93089) taking off for a joint US/Honduran parachute jump during a mobilization of US exercise "Task Force Dragon/Golden Pheasant" in 1988.

Sahsa: 12

==== Hungary ====
- Hungarian Air Force operated Soviet-built Li-2s.

==== India ====
- Indian Air Force

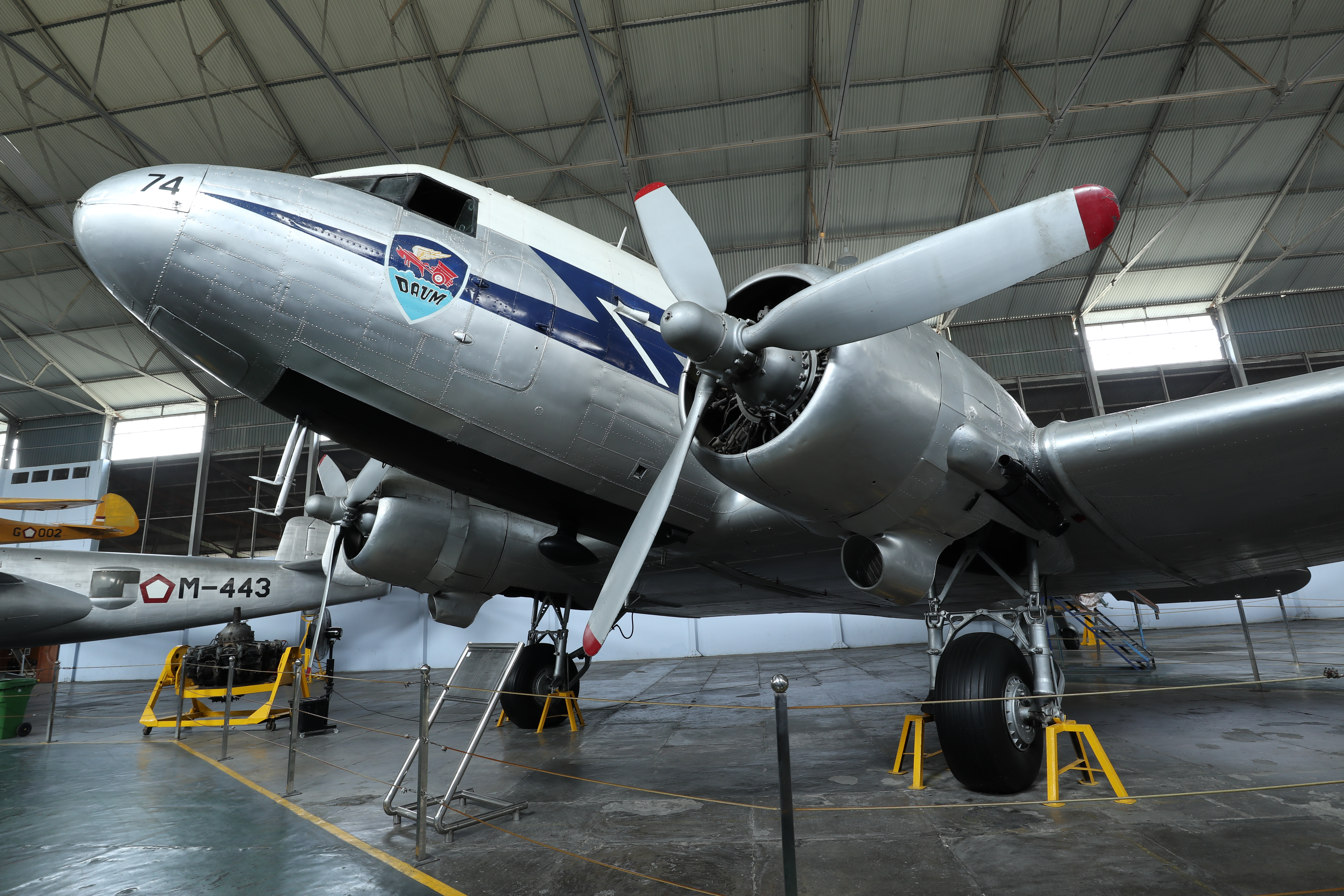
Indonesian Air Force C-47 Dakota 1 in Dirgantara Mandala Museum

==== Indonesia ====
- Indonesian Army (TNI-AD)
- Indonesian Navy (TNI-AL)
- Indonesian Air Force (TNI-AU)
  - C-47 Dakota RI-001 Seulawah was bought by the Acehnese in 1948 and flown between Java and Sumatra. After the war of independence in 1949 some C-47s were transferred from the Royal Netherlands East Indies Air Force and later ex-RAAF C-47s were received as foreign aid. During the Indonesian invasion of East Timor two C-47s were converted to Gunships with three AN/M3 Browning machine guns.

==== Iran ====
- Imperial Iranian Air Force

The IIAF acquired 22 Douglas C-47 Skytrains in 1949.

==== Israel ====
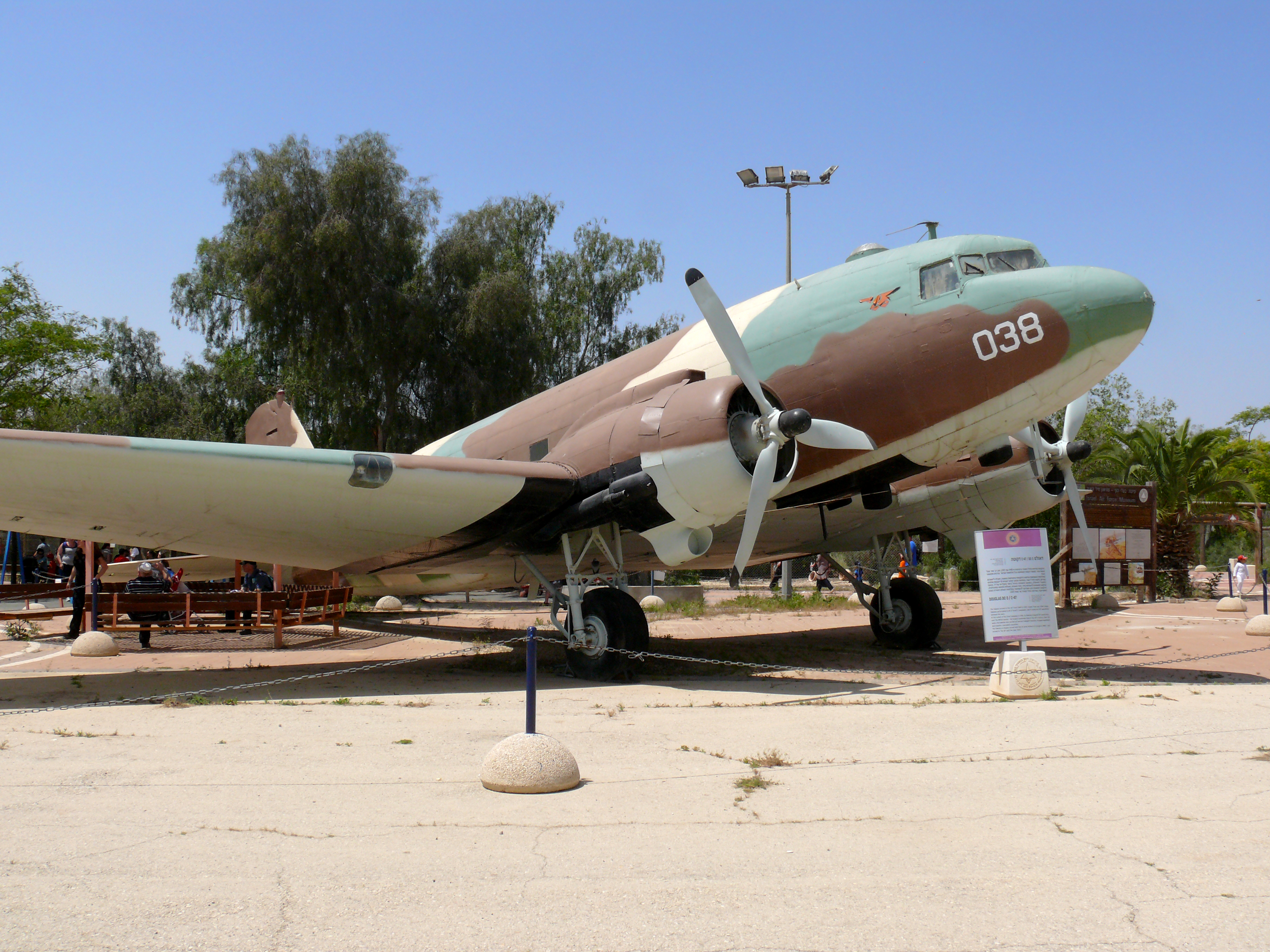
Douglas DC-3 Dakota of the Israeli Air Force.

- Israeli Air Force

==== Italy ====
- Italian Air Force
  - Operated 19 C-47s and 8 C-53 as staff transports and ECM aircraft into the mid-1980s.

==== Japan ====
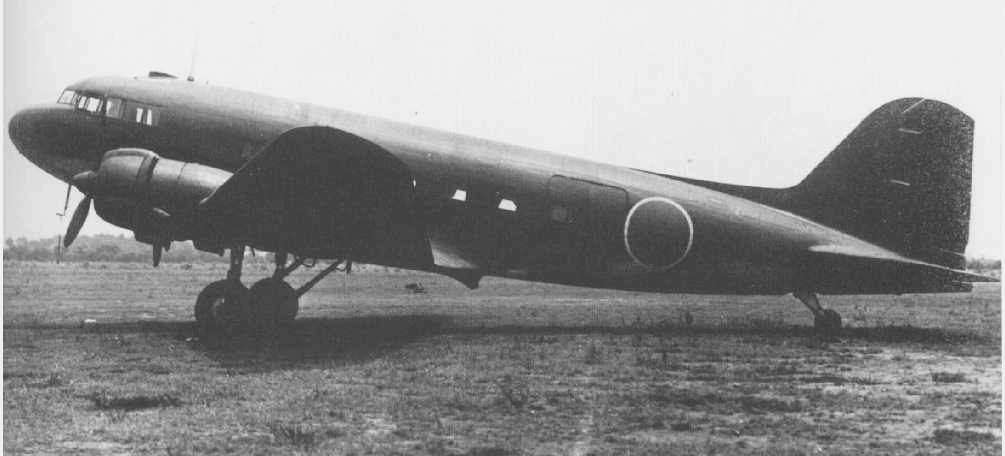
Shōwa L2D3, WW2 era

- On 24 February 1938, a subsidiary of Nakajima (Mitsui) purchased production rights and technical data to the DC-3 for $90,000. The aircraft was extensively redesigned to use Japanese raw materials, and the Pratt & Whitney Twin Wasp engines were replaced with Mitsubishi Kinsei 43 radial engines. Production initially lagged behind expectations until 1942. Japanese DC-3s were given the Navy designation L2D-2 (L-transport, 2-second Douglas type, D-Douglas, 2-second sub-type). L2D1 was used for imported DC-3s. The Japanese built eight subtypes in two basic configurations, as passenger transport and as cargo planes. In two years, Nakajima built 71 L2D-2s before handing production over to Showa, which built 416, including 75 freighters equipped with a large side door.

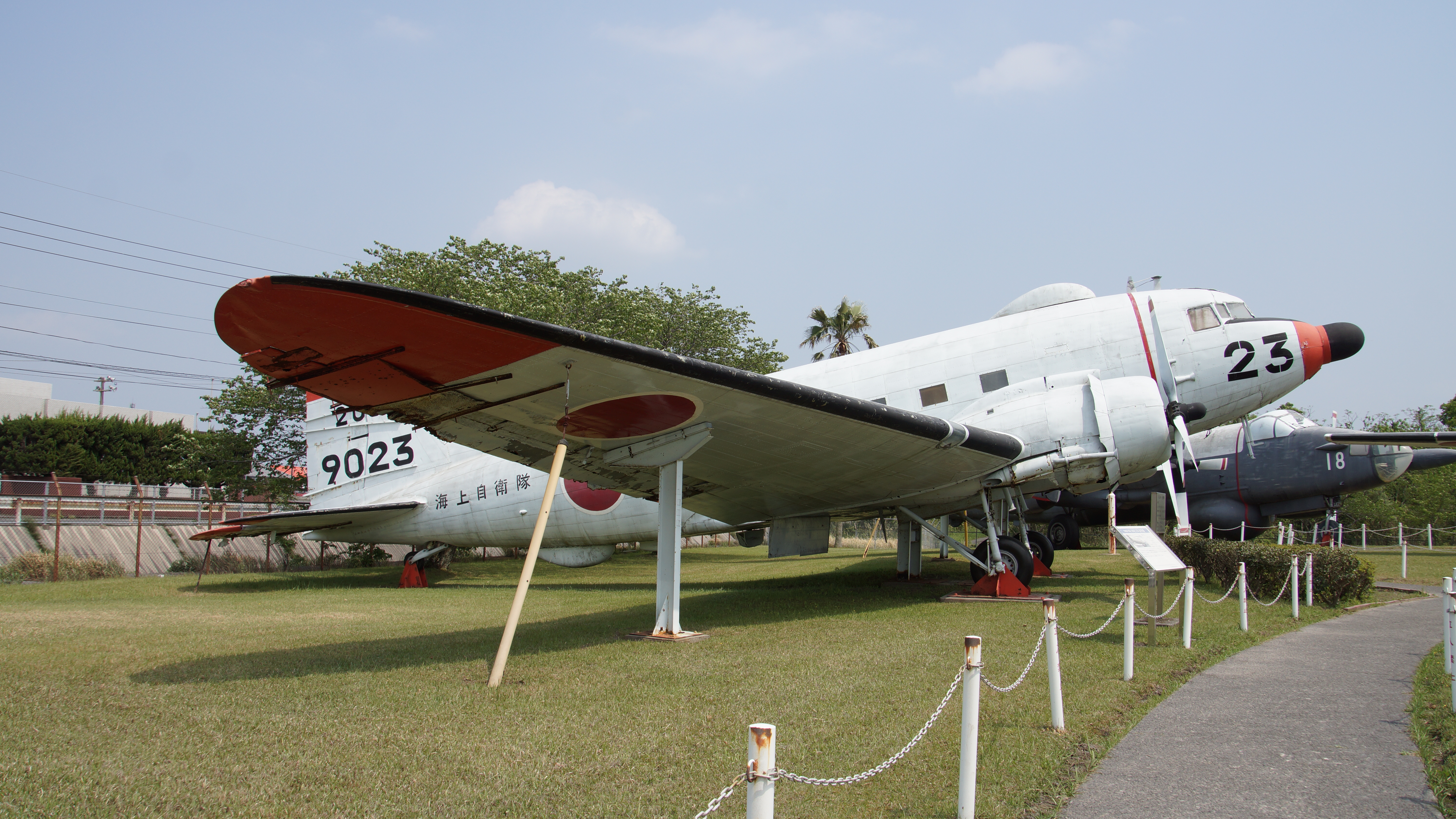
JMSDF R4D-6Q Manazuru

- Japan Maritime Self-Defense Force received two R4D-6s, one R4D-7, and one R4D-6Q from the United States in 1958. JMSDF designated them as R4D-6/R4D-6Q "Manazuru" (White-naped crane). They were retired by 1972.

==== Laos ====
- Royal Lao Air Force
  - Received ex-RAAF C-47s as foreign aid.

==== Libya ====
- Royal Libyan Air Force – operated several C-47Bs donated in the 1960s by the United States.

==== Morocco ====
- Royal Moroccan Air Force – received a few DC-3s in 1961, handed over by Royal Air Maroc. As of 1962, 10 C-47s were on strength. Four additional aircraft were delivered by the United States around 1964. At least 10 C-47s were still operational as of 1975. However, they have been retired before 1985.

==== Mozambique ====
- LAM Mozambique Airlines and its predecessor Direcção de Exploração de Transportes Aéreos

==== Netherlands ====
- Royal Netherlands Air Force
- Dutch Naval Aviation Service
- Royal Netherlands East Indies Air Force – Postwar

==== Oman ====
- Dhofar City Airways

==== New Zealand ====
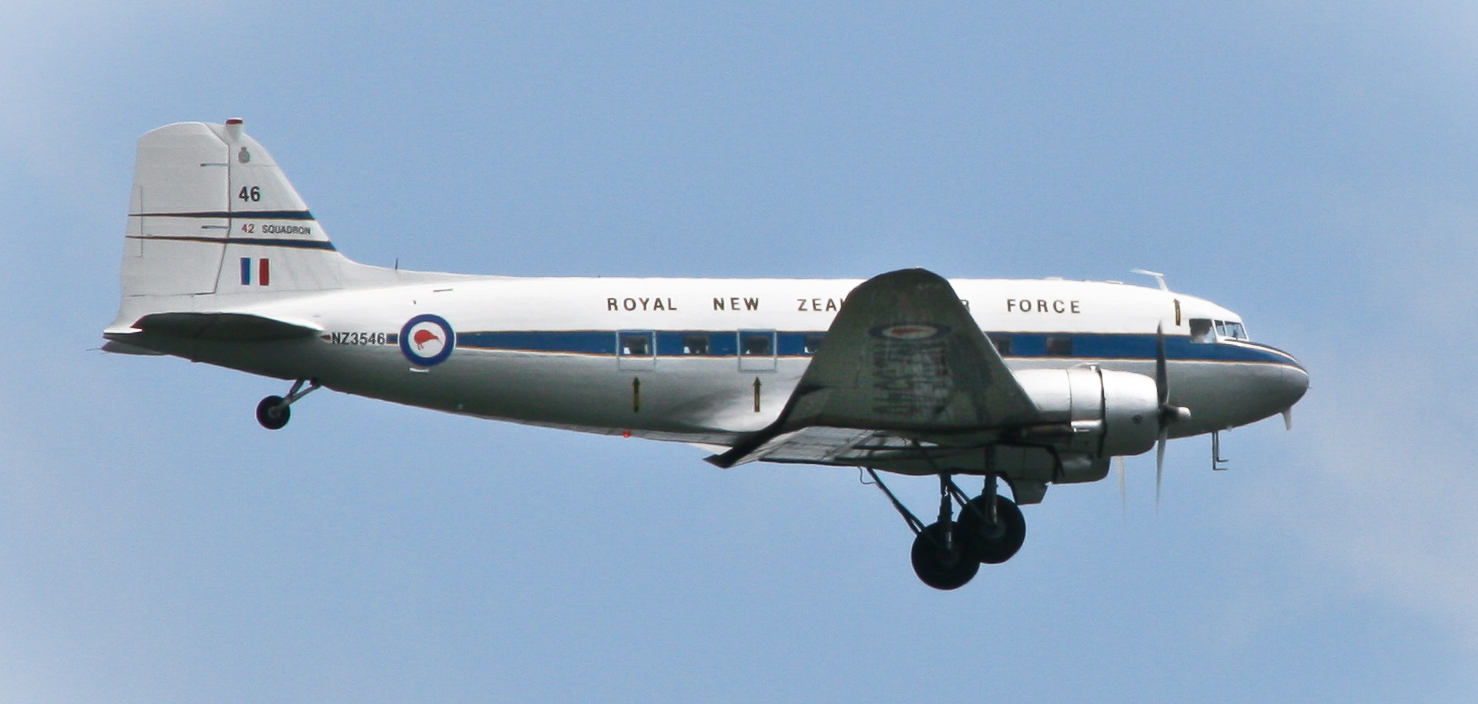
Royal New Zealand Air Force C-47

- Royal New Zealand Air Force: Operated 49 C-47s between 1942 and 1977.
  - No. 40 Squadron RNZAF
  - No. 41 Squadron RNZAF
  - No. 42 Squadron RNZAF

==== Niger ====
- Niger Air Force
  - Four C-47s received in the 1960s.

==== North Yemen ====
- Yemen Arab Republic Air Force

==== Norway ====
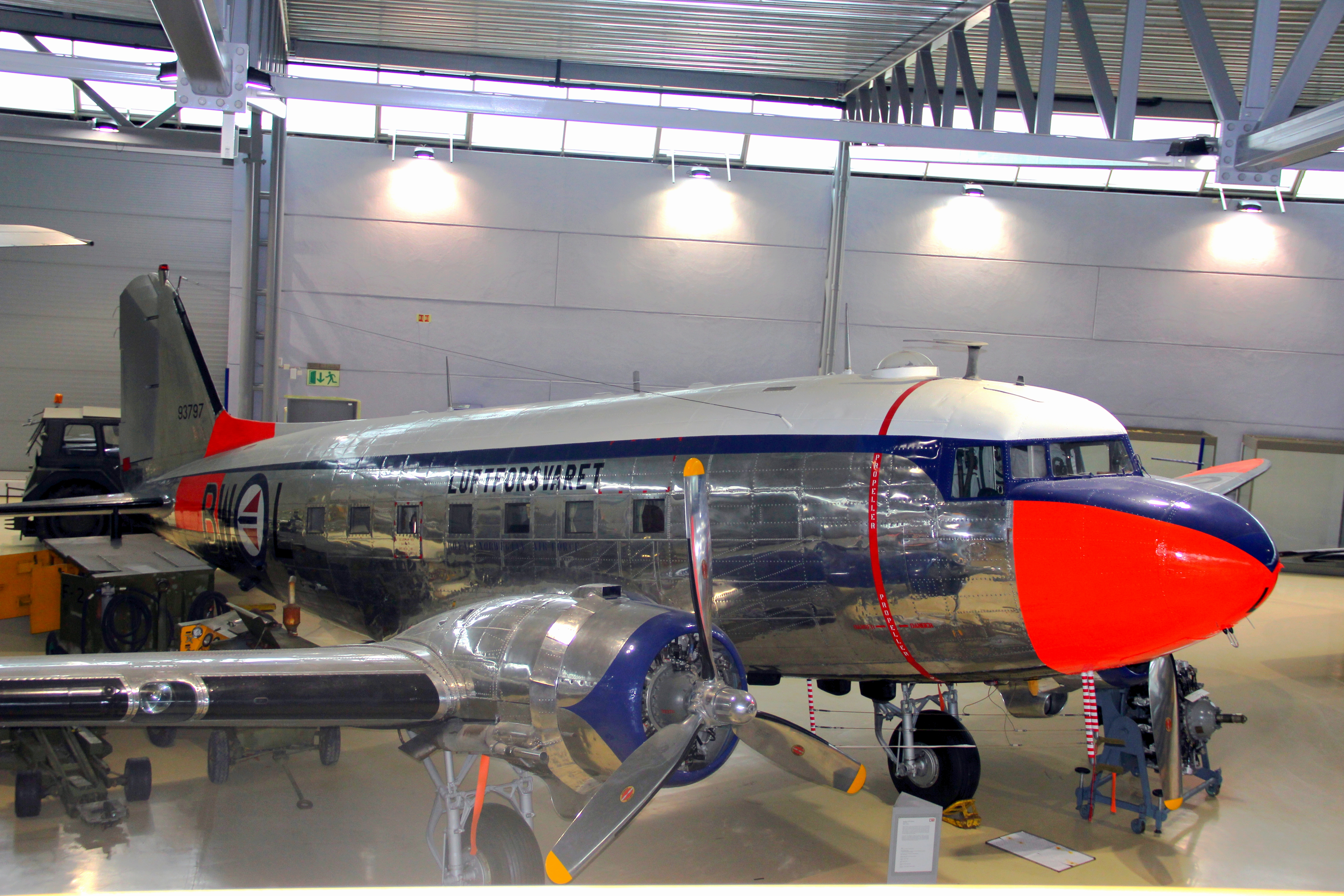
Norwegian Air Force C-47

- Royal Norwegian Air Force

==== Pakistan ====
- Pakistan Air Force
  - Received eight C-47 Dakota cargo planes which it used to transport supplies to soldiers fighting in the 1947 War in Kashmir against India.

==== Papua New Guinea ====
- Papua New Guinea Defence Force Air Operations Element
  - A total of seven ex-Royal Australian Air Force C-47s were transferred to the PNGDF following independence in 1973.

==== Paraguay ====
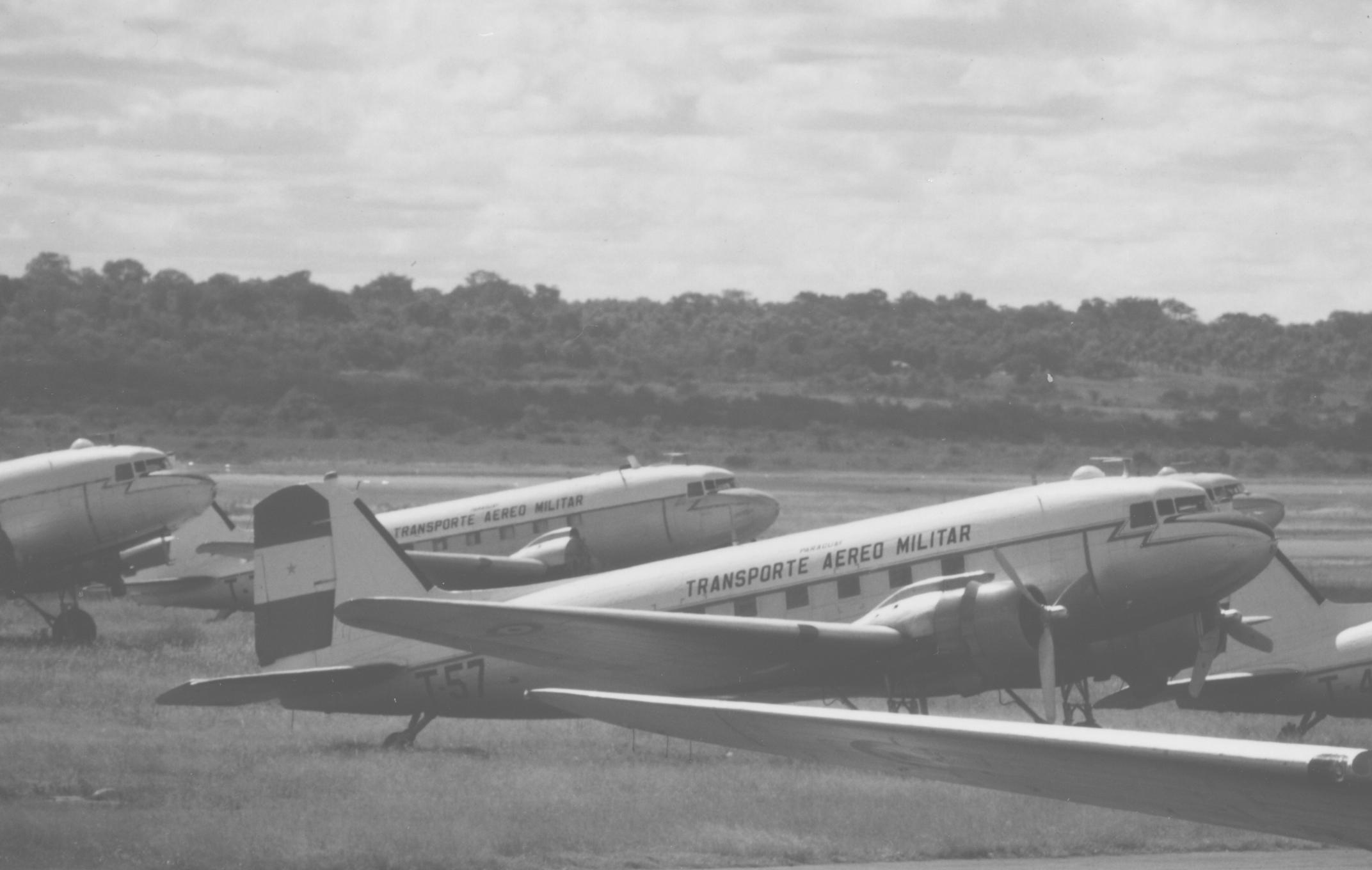
Douglas C-47 Sytrains of Paraguay's Transporte Aero Miltar at Asuncion's P.G. Stoessner Airport

- Paraguayan Air Force (FAP)
  - Transporte Aéreo Militar (TAM): Between 1953 and 1998, TAM operated 33 Douglas C-47/DC-3s. The first five aircraft were purchased in the U.S. The U.S. government, through MAP donated 21 C-47s between 1962 and 1973. Chile donated 2 C-47s in 1981 and Brazil 2 C-47 in 1984.
- Paraguayan Naval Aviation (ANP)
  - Servicio Aero Naval (SAN): In 1981, the Argentinian Naval Aviation donated one C-47 to its Paraguayan counterpart.
- Líneas Aéreas Paraguayas (LAP): This airline used one C-47 borrowed from TAM between 1970 and 1974.

==== Philippines ====
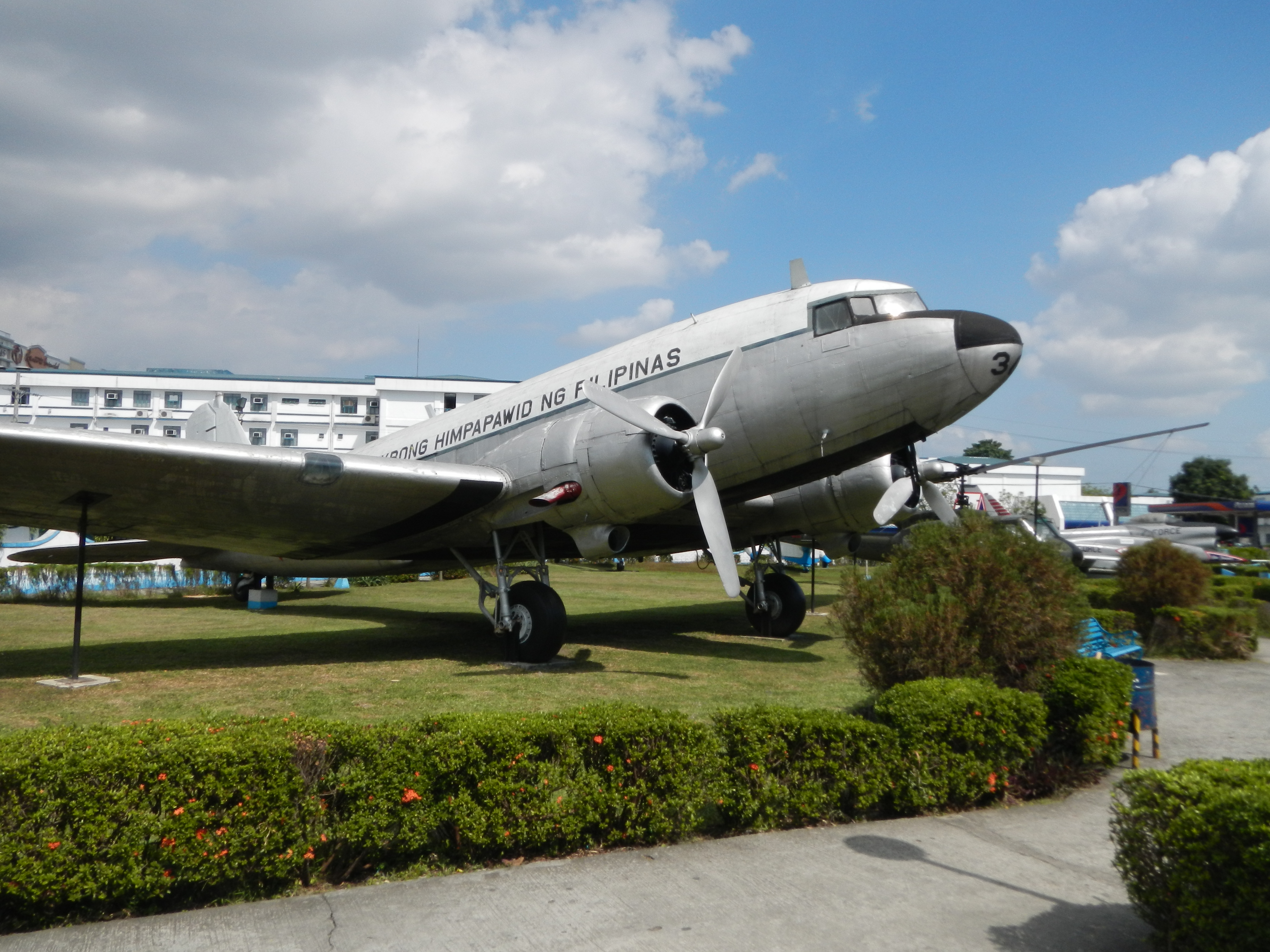
C-47 Skytrain Philippine Air Force

- Philippine Army Air Corps (1945–1947)
- Philippine Air Force
  - President Magsaysay of the Philippines was killed in the crash of a Philippine Air Force C-47 in 1957.
  - Some were ex-RAAF C-47s received as foreign aid.

==== Poland ====
- Polish Air Force operated up to 17 C-47As, known as C-47 Dakota. Several were acquired in 1944–1945 from the USSR, and most bought in 1946 from US stocks. They were used until early 1960, along with Soviet-built Li-2s.
- LOT Polish Airlines operated nine C-47s, also known as Dakota, bought in 1946 from US stocks and used as passenger airliners (registration numbers SP-LCA to LCI). Several ex-Air Force aircraft were used as well. They were used until 1959, at least three crashed.

==== Portugal ====
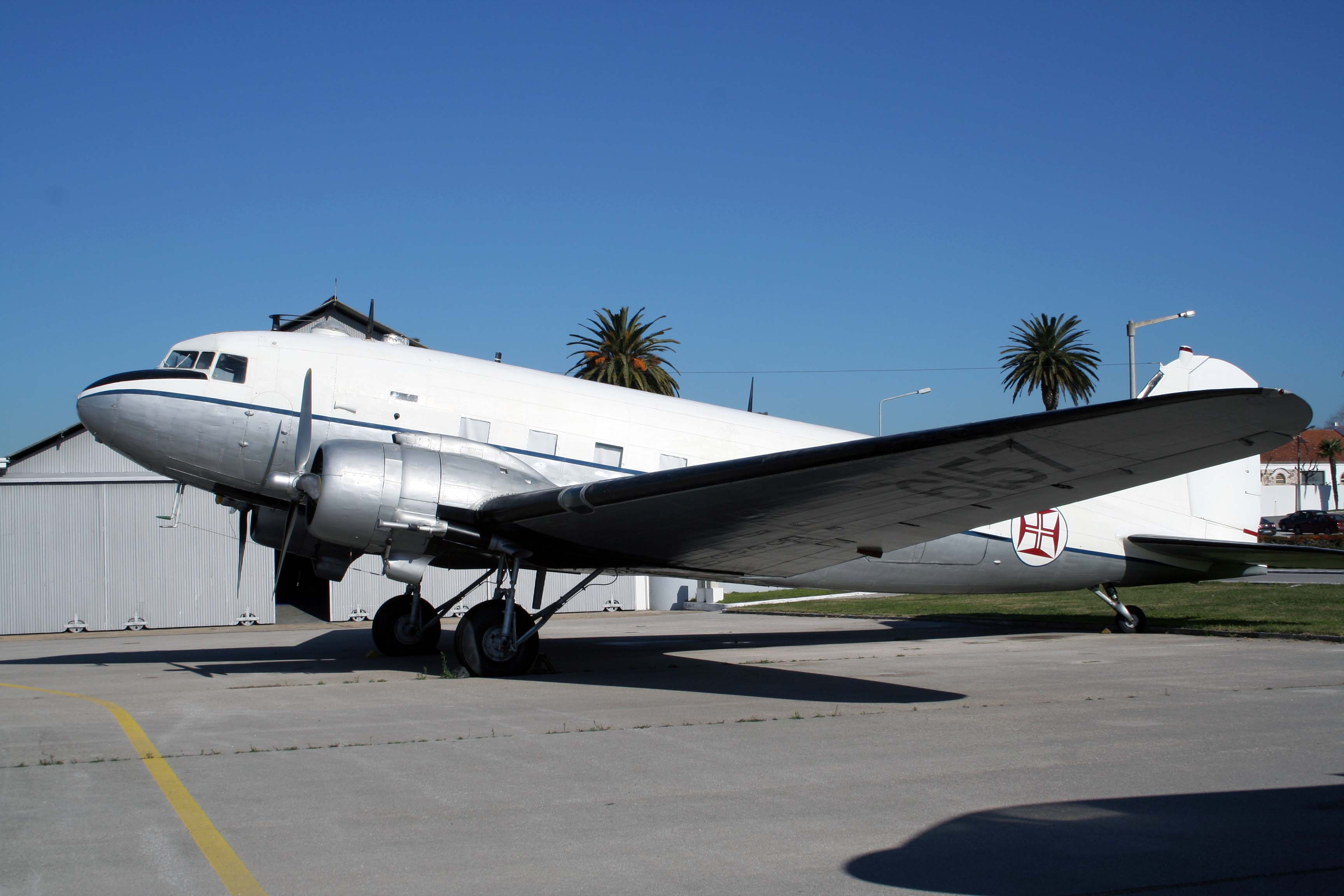
Portuguese Air Force C-47A

Section source: Geocities C-47

The first Portuguese Dakota (where it was only known as the Dakota) was interned in 1944 and it remained the sole example in Portuguese service transporting military VIPs until September 1958 when additional Dakotas came from the United States. Portuguese Dakotas were used for a wide variety of roles including one aircraft (6155) used as a bomber during the Portuguese Colonial War, and two converted to spray pesticides. The Dakota was retired in 1976. One (6157) was preserved for the Museu do Ar (Air Museum).

Portuguese Air Force

- 81 Squadron – Transport mission
- E.I.C.P.A.C. – Esquadra de Instrução Complementar de Pilotagem de Aviões Pesados (Heavy Transport Training Squadron). Formed at B.A.2 Ota in 1960 with C-47s.
- E.L.T.S. – Esquadrilha de Ligação de Transporte Sanitário (Sanitary Transport Squadron). Also based at Lisbon, had aircraft equipped for VIP and medical transport.
- 101 Squadron – Formed at B.A.10 – Beira (Moçambique) on 5 February 1962 with C-47s. Later transferred to Lourenço Marques as Esquadra 801.

Aeronáutica Militar (Army Military Aviation)

- Esquadrilha Independente de Aviação de Caça-Secção de Transportes Aéreos (Fighter-Air Transport Section of Independent Aviation Squadron)

==== Romania ====
- Romanian Air Force operated 15 Soviet-built Li-2 transferred from TAROM airlines.
- TAROM operated 28 Soviet-built Li-2s from 1946.

==== Rhodesia ====
- Rhodesian Air Force

==== Saudi Arabia ====
- Royal Saudi Air Force

==== Senegal ====
- Senegalese Air Force

==== Somalia ====
- Somali air corps – 3 in 1981, all withdrawn

==== South Africa ====
- South African Air Force
  - 44 Squadron SAAF: Employed in 1944 and 1945 to support operations in the Greek Civil War.

==== Southern Rhodesia ====
- Southern Rhodesian Air Force

==== South Korea ====
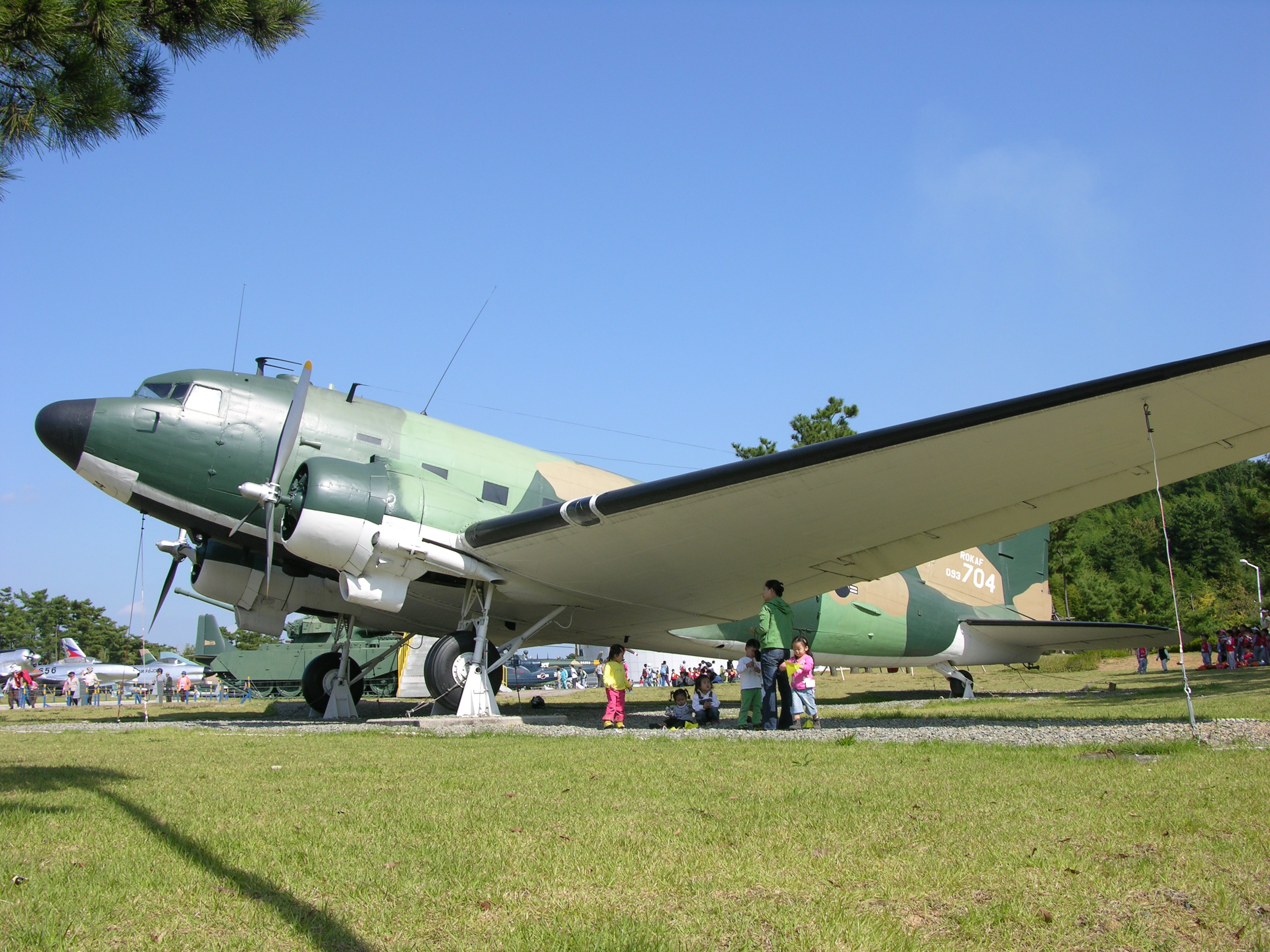
Republic of Korea Air Force EC-47Q, KAI Aerospace Museum.

- Republic of Korea Air Force

==== South Yemen ====
- People's Republic of Yemen Air Force – operated four C-47s left behind by the British at independence, in 1967.

==== Soviet Union ====
- Soviet Air Force: The Lisunov Li-2 was a license-built DC-3, produced in Russia. Some 6000 were built between 1939 and 1952. The Soviet Union also operated C-47s supplied under Lend-Lease during World War II.

==== Sudan ====
- Sudanese Air Force: two C-47s delivered in the early 1960s.

==== Sweden ====
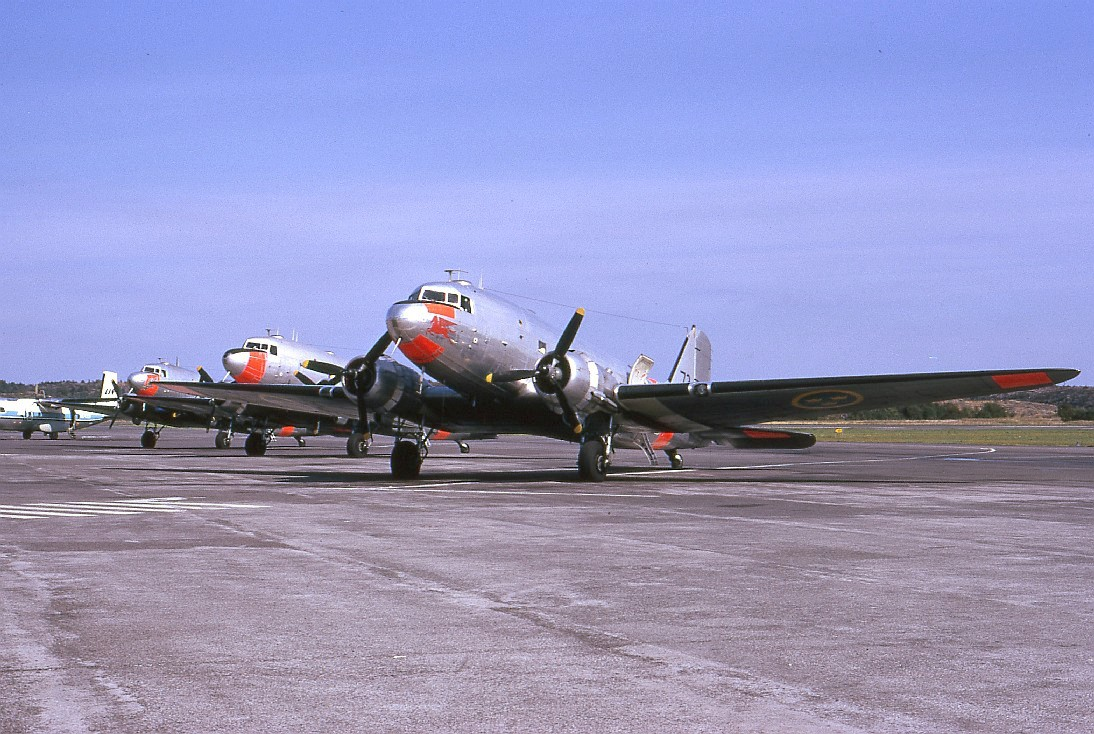
Swedish Air Force Tp 79 (C-47A)

The Swedish Air Force started using C-47s soon after World War II for transport purposes. A few were converted to SIGINT platforms and eavesdropped on Soviet radio communications and radar stations in the 1950s. One such aircraft was shot down by Soviet fighters in international airspace over the Baltic Sea in 1952 with all of the crew killed.

==== Turkey ====
- Turkish Air Force
- Turkish Airlines

==== Uganda ====
- Uganda Air Force: received C-47s from Israel in the mid-1960s.

==== United Kingdom ====
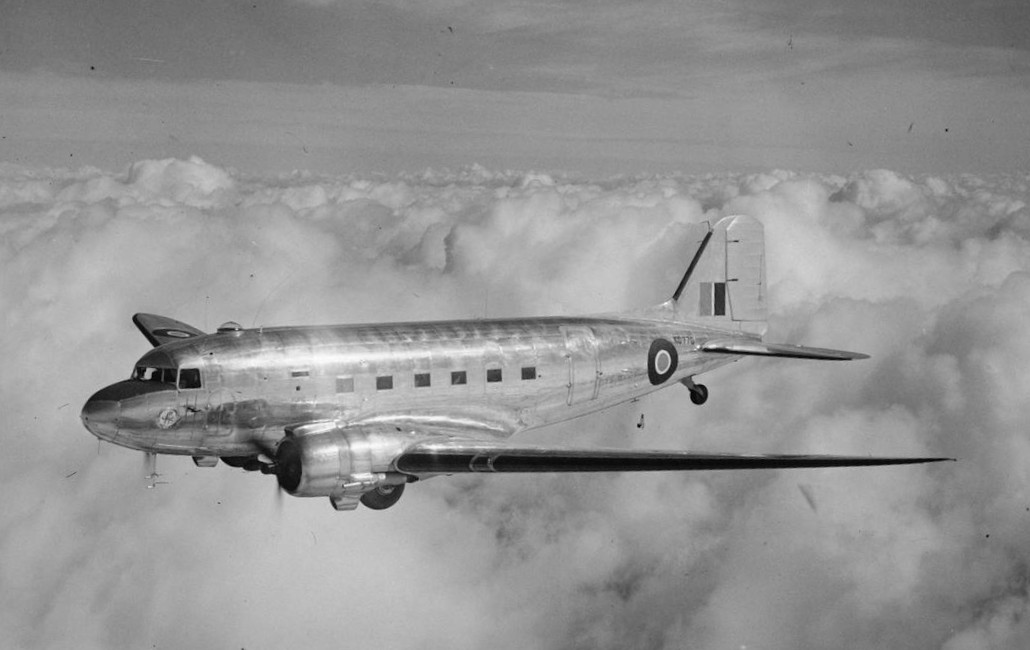
A Douglas Dakota C.III of the Royal Air Force with King George VI and Queen Elizabeth on a trip to the Channel Islands in 1945.

- Royal Air Force: RAF Transport Command was supplied with over 1,900 Dakotas under Lend-Lease during World War II and the type was flown by at least 46 operational squadrons, plus numerous support units. The RAF flew 50 Dakota I (C-47), 9 Dakota II (C-53), 962 Dakota III (C-47A) and 896 Dakota IV (C-47B). RAF Dakotas were assigned to all theatres of operations. RAF Dakotas dropped paratroopers and equipment and towed gliders to the Normandy landings and Arnhem. Four squadrons of Dakota IVs took part in the Berlin Airlift in 1948/49. The Battle of Britain Memorial Flight operates a single Dakota.
  - No. 10 Squadron RAF, No. 18 Squadron RAF, No. 21 Squadron RAF, No. 24 Squadron RAF, No. 27 Squadron RAF, No. 30 Squadron RAF, No. 31 Squadron RAF, No. 46 Squadron RAF, No. 48 Squadron RAF, No. 52 Squadron RAF, No. 53 Squadron RAF, No. 62 Squadron RAF, No. 70 Squadron RAF, No. 76 Squadron RAF, No. 77 Squadron RAF, No. 78 Squadron RAF, No. 96 Squadron RAF, No. 110 (Hyderabad) Squadron RAF, No. 113 Squadron RAF, No. 114 (Hong Kong) Squadron RAF, No. 117 Squadron RAF, No. 147 Squadron RAF, No. 167 (Gold Coast) Squadron RAF, No. 187 Squadron RAF, No. 194 Squadron RAF, No. 204 Squadron RAF, No. 206 Squadron RAF, No. 209 (Hong Kong) Squadron RAF, No. 215 Squadron RAF, No. 216 Squadron RAF, No. 231 Squadron RAF, No. 233 Squadron RAF, No. 238 Squadron RAF, No. 243 Squadron RAF, No. 267 Squadron RAF, No. 271 Squadron RAF, No. 353 Squadron RAF, No. 357 Squadron RAF, No. 435 Squadron RCAF, No. 436 Squadron RCAF, No. 437 Squadron RCAF, No. 511 Squadron RAF, No. 512 Squadron RAF, No. 525 Squadron RAF, No. 575 Squadron RAF, No. 620 Squadron RAF
- BOAC: 59 C-47s were supplied to BOAC to maintain international air links.

==== United States ====
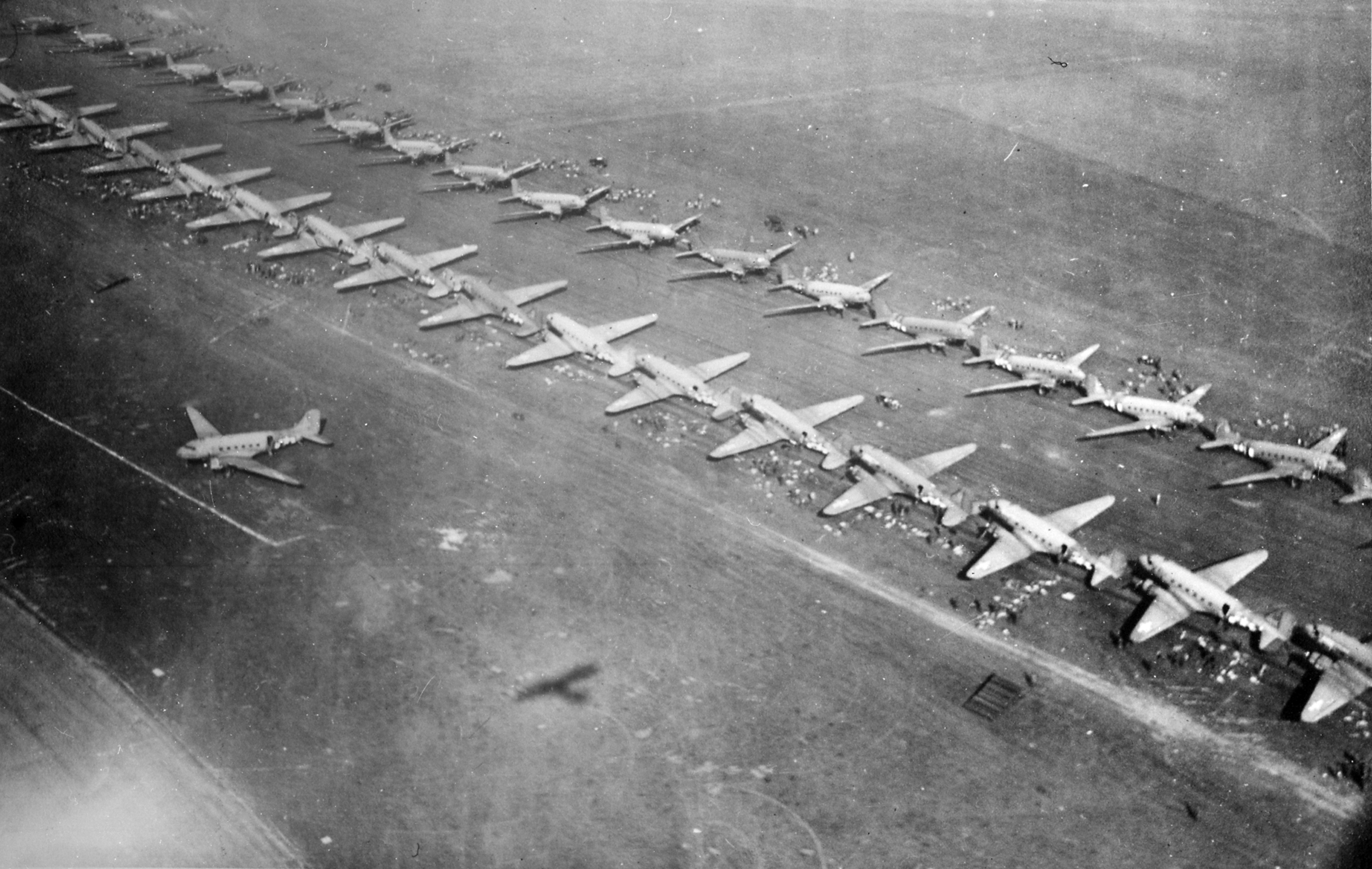
C-47 transport planes, Operation Market Garden, 1944

- United States Army Air Corps
- United States Army Air Forces
- United States Air Force
- United States Marine Corps
- United States Navy
- United States Coast Guard
- Air National Guard
- Federal Aviation Administration
- National Test Pilot School

==== Venezuela ====
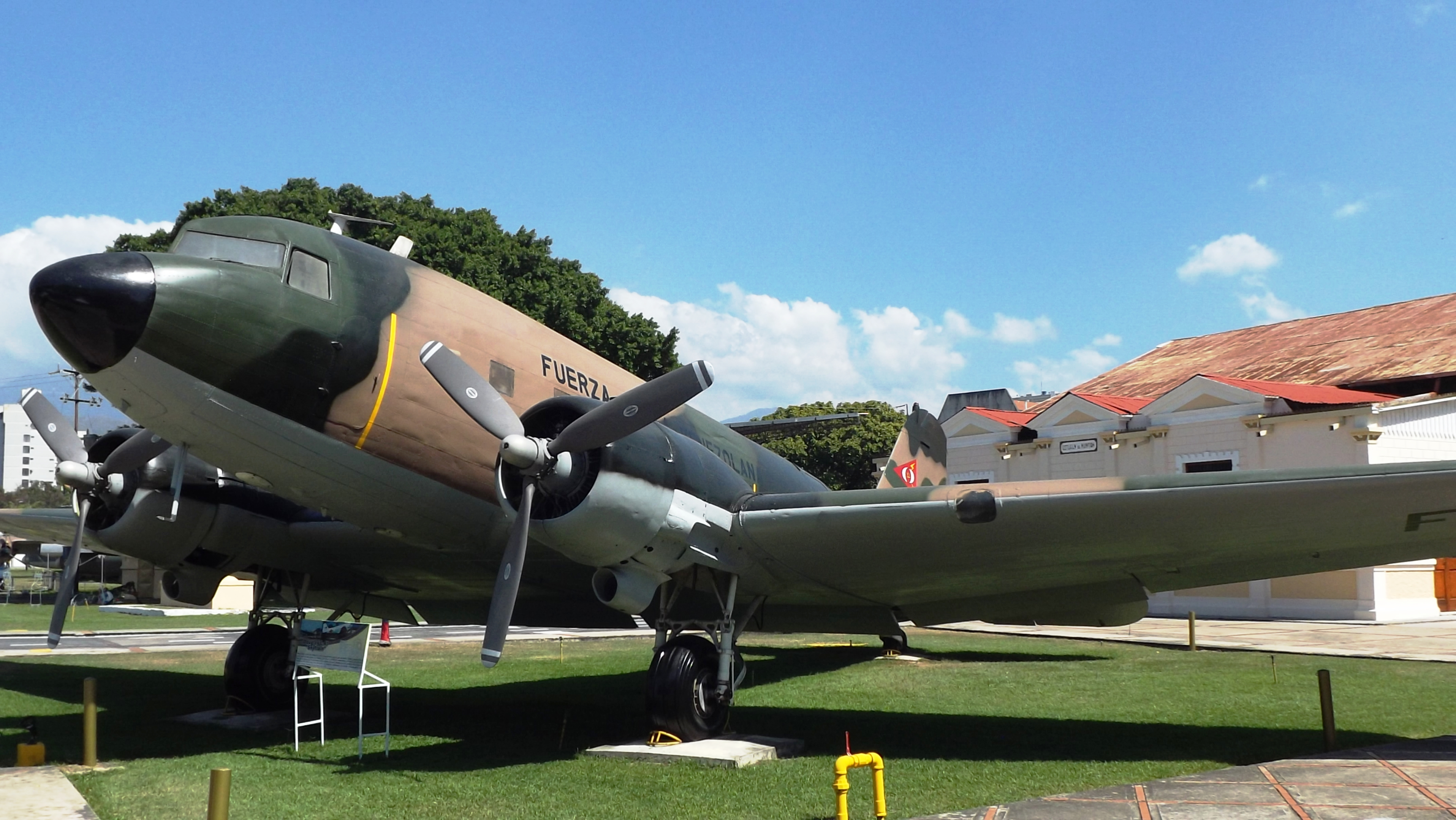
C-47, Venezuelan Air Force

- Venezuelan Air Force

==== Republic of Vietnam ====
- Air Vietnam
- Republic of Vietnam Air Force

==== Yugoslavia ====
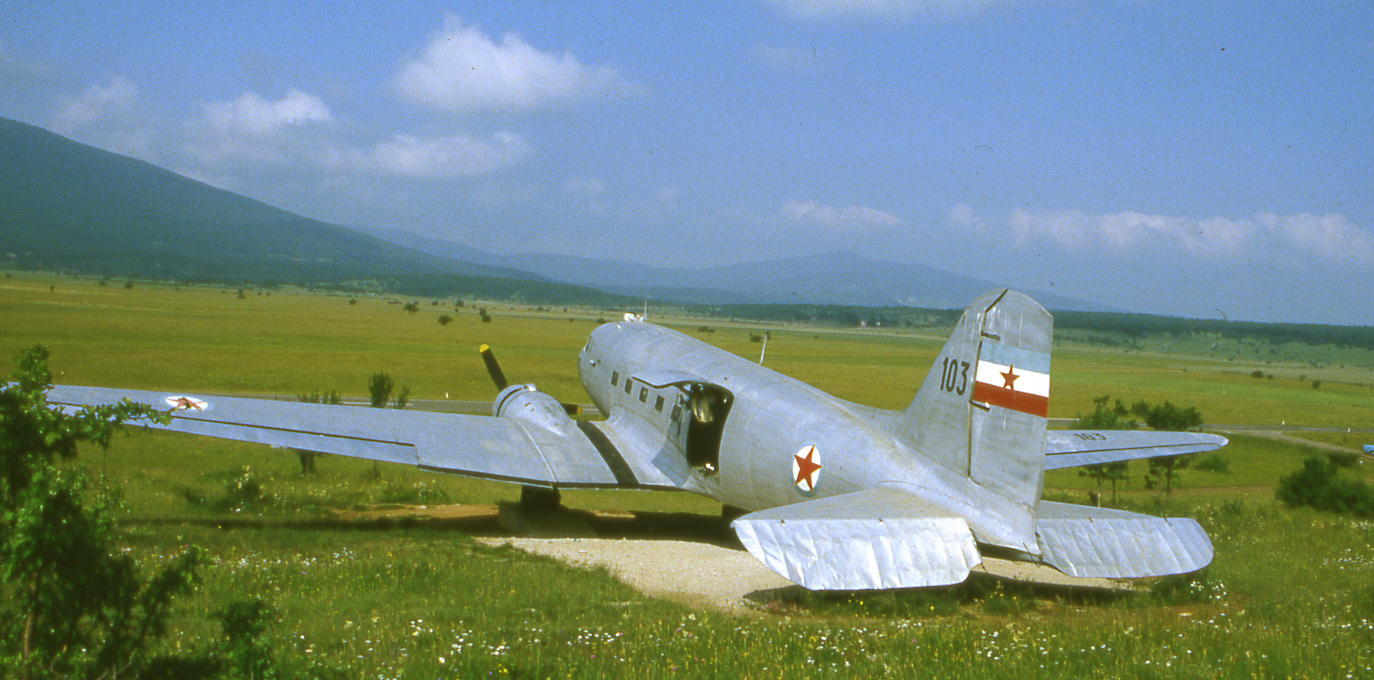
Yugoslav Air Force C-47

- SFR Yugoslav Air Force
  - 41 were operated from 1946 until 1976. 20 were received through military aid in 1953–1954. Also operated Li-2 aircraft
- SUKL (Federal ATC Authority) used 1 aircraft for navid calibration until 1986.
- Yugoslav Airlines operated around 20 converted military Dakotas bought from Great Britain in 1947.

==== Zambia ====
- Zambian Air Force: operated 4 C-47s starting in 1964.

==== Zimbabwe ====
- Air Force of Zimbabwe

== See also ==
- List of Douglas DC-3 operators
