= List of original DC-3 operators =

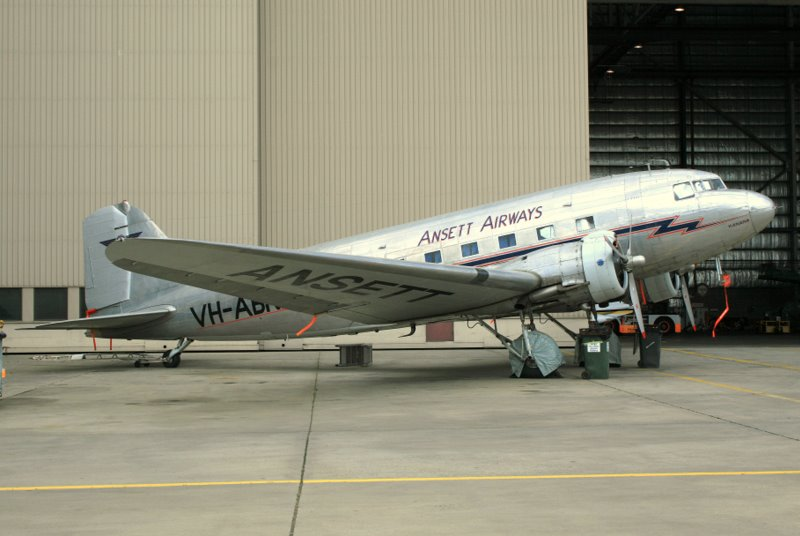
A DC-3 with Wright Cyclone engines, built in 1938 for Australian National Airways

The List of original Douglas DC-3 operators lists only the original customers who purchased new aircraft.

With the availability of large numbers of surplus military C-47 Skytrains or Dakotas after the Second World War, nearly every airline and military force in the 1940s and 1950s operated the aircraft at some point. More than ninety years after the type's first flight, in the third decade of the 21st century the Douglas DC-3 is still in commercial operation.

== Commercial operators ==
Australia

- Australian National Airways (ANA)

Belgium

- Sabena (Note: Assembled and sold by Fokker)

Canada

- Canadian Colonial Airways

Czechoslovakia

- Československá letecká společnost (ČLS)
- Československé státní aerolinie (ČSA)

France

- Air France

Ireland

- Aer Lingus

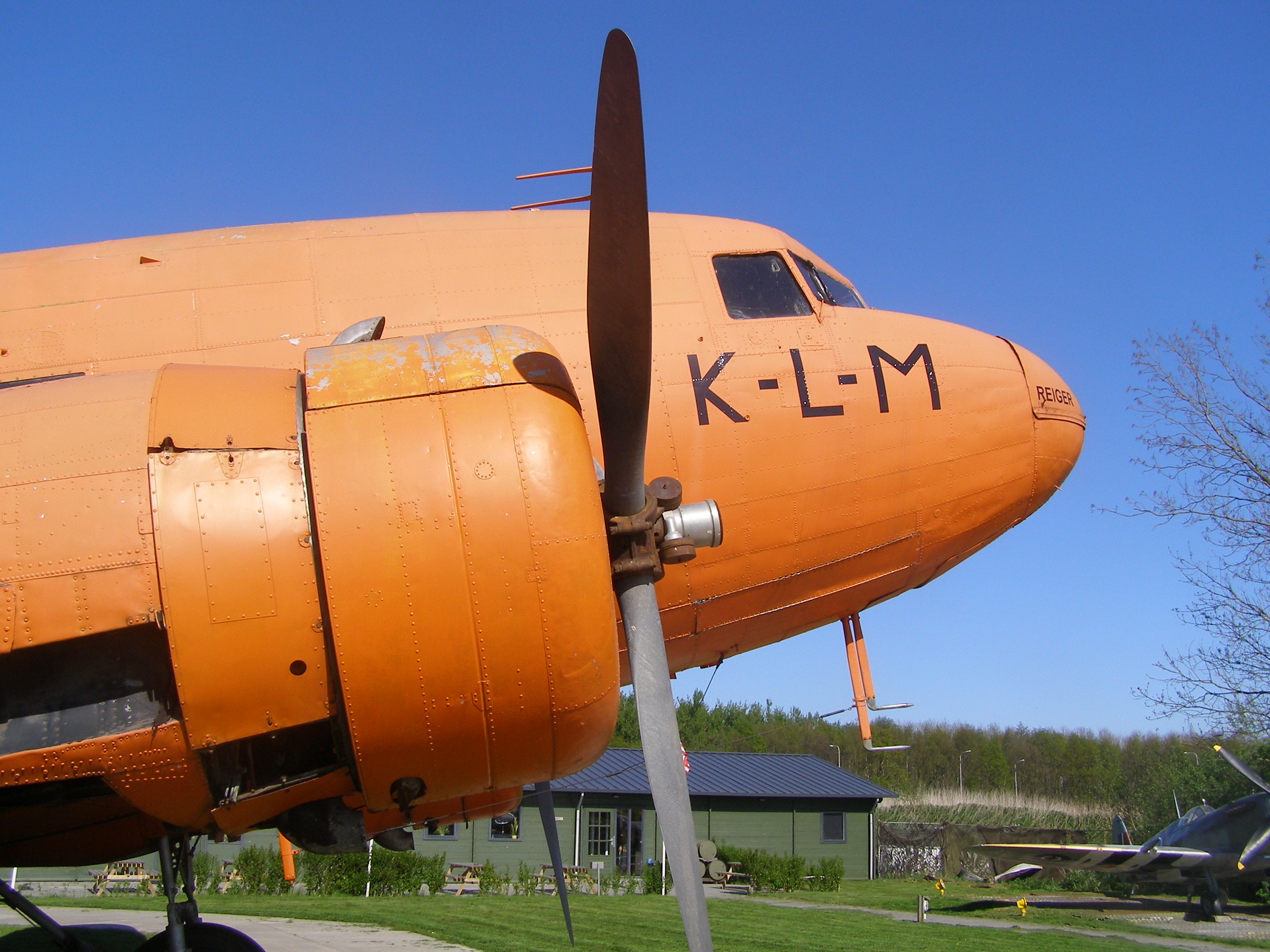
KLM pre-war (1939-1940) orange paint scheme for easy recognition as an aircraft of a neutral country

Netherlands

- KLM

Japan

- Far East Fur Trading
- Great Northern Airways
- Imperial Japanese Airways
- Japan Air Transport

Peru

- PANAGRA

Romania

- LARES

Soviet Union (Russia)

- Mongolian Transport Company
- Northeast

Sweden

- AB Aerotransport

Switzerland

- Swissair

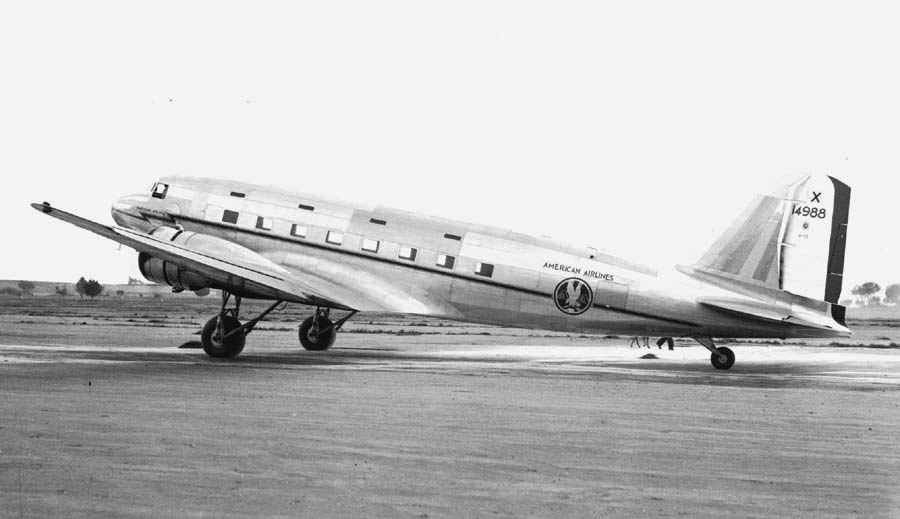
The first DC-3 series aircraft built was this Douglas Sleeper Transport (DST). Seven DSTs were manufactured for American Airlines before the first DC-3 rolled off the production line.

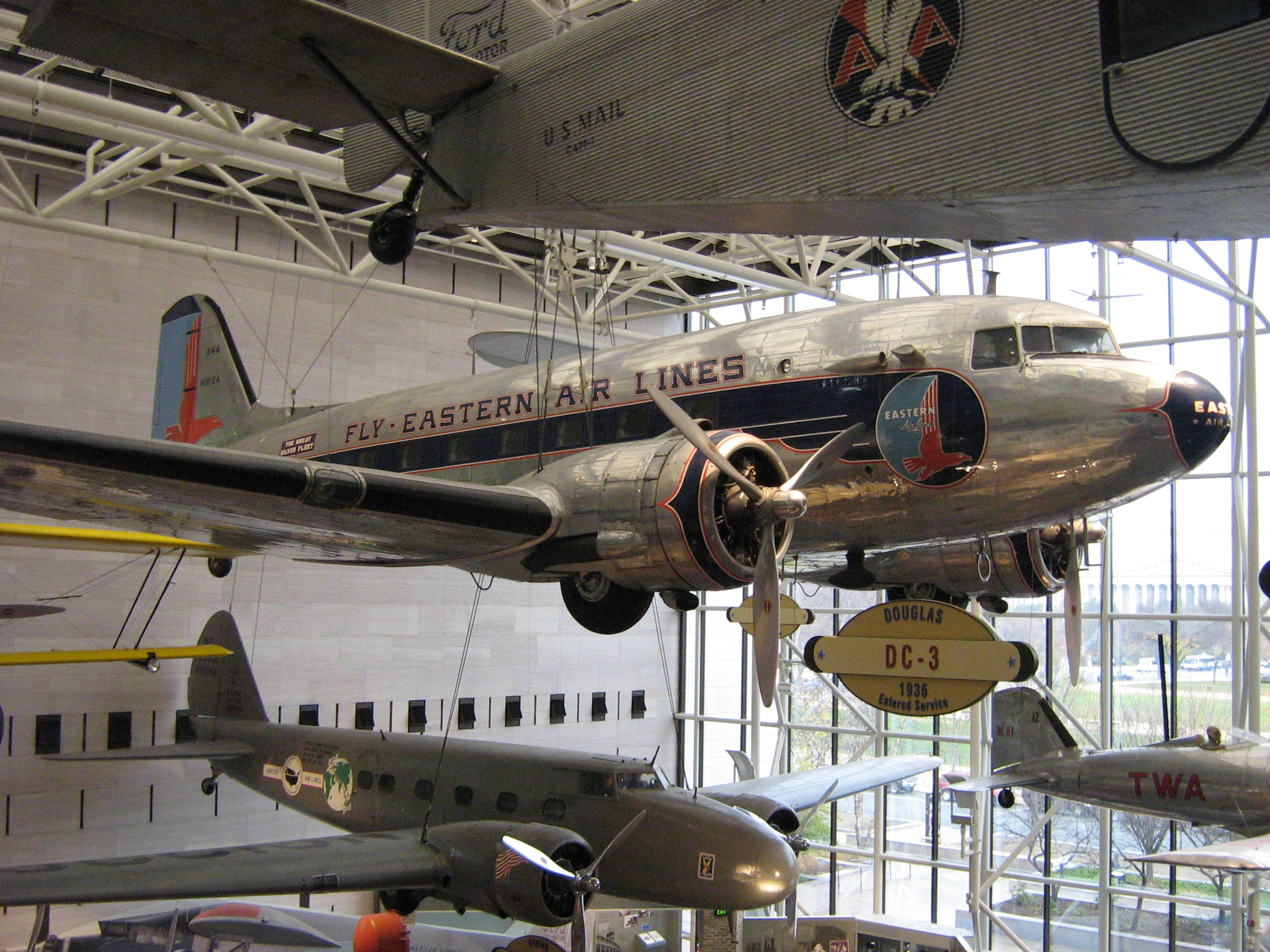
This DC-3 was delivered to Eastern Air Lines on 7 December 1937 and on its retirement from Eastern service in December 1952 was donated to the National Air and Space Museum.

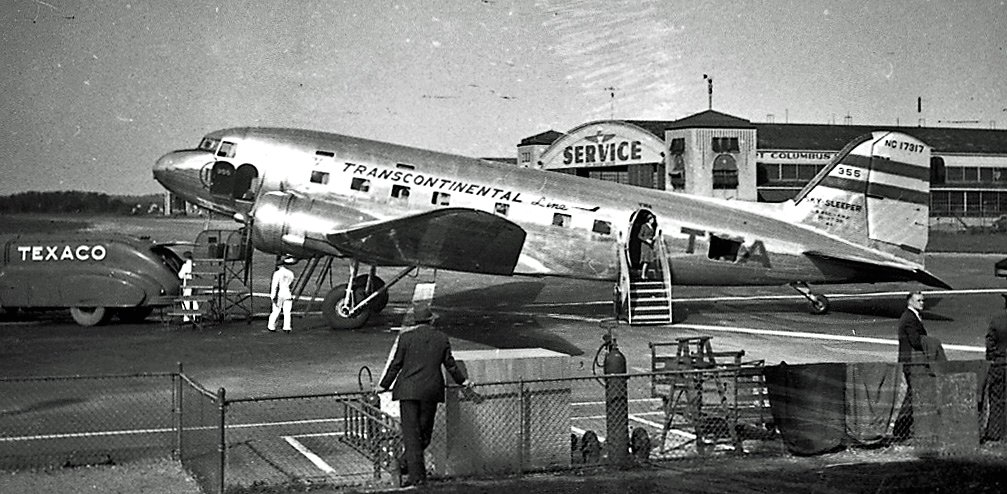
A Transcontinental & Western Air DC-3 in 1941

United States

- American Airlines
- Braniff Airways
- Capital Airlines - the only purchaser of the DC-3S Super DC-3 post-war variant
- Chicago and Southern Air Lines
- Canadian Colonial Airlines
- Delta Air Lines
- Eastern Air Lines
- Hawaiian Airlines
- Northeast
- Northwest Airlines
- Pan American-Grace Airways
- Pan American World Airways
- Pennsylvania Central Airlines
- Transcontinental & Western Air
- United Airlines
- Western Air Express

== Business and Executive operators ==
United States

- Civil Aeronautics Authority
- Swiftflite Inc

== Military operators ==
United States

- United States Army Air Corps/United States Army Air Forces
  - Includes aircraft built for the Royal Netherlands East Indies Army Air Force but taken over before delivery following the Japanese occupation of the Dutch East Indies
- United States Navy

== See also ==
- List of Douglas C-47 Skytrain operators
