= 2018 Pretoria Convair 340 crash =

Aviation disaster in South Africa

Coordinates: 25°44′46″S 28°11′17″E

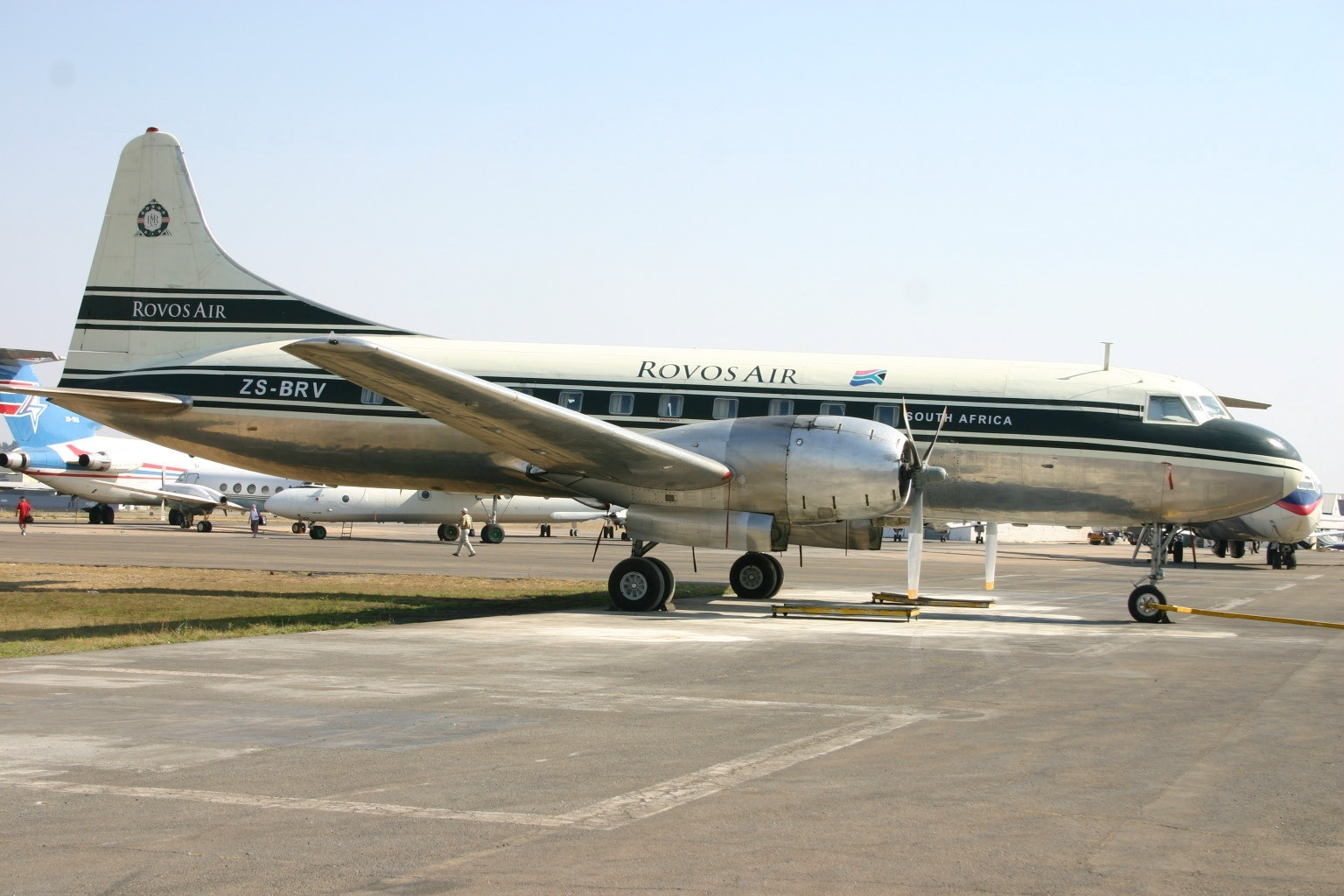
- ZS-BRV, the aircraft involved, seen in September 2006 with its previous Rovos Air livery

Accident
- Date: 10 July 2018
- Summary: Engine failure and pilot error
- Site: Near Wonderboom Airport, Pretoria, South Africa
- Total fatalities: 3
- Total injuries: 26

Aircraft
- Aircraft type: Convair 340
- Call sign: BRAVO ROMEO VICTOR
- Registration: ZS-BRV
- Flight origin: Wonderboom Airport
- Destination: Pilanesberg International Airport
- Occupants: 19
- Passengers: 16
- Crew: 3
- Fatalities: 2
- Injuries: 17
- Survivors: 17

Ground casualties
- Ground fatalities: 1
- Ground injuries: 8

On 10 July 2018, a Convair 340 owned by Dutch aviation museum Aviodrome crashed during a trial flight in Pretoria, South Africa. The aircraft suffered an engine fire moments after takeoff, and crashed into a factory building as the crew attempted to return it to Wonderboom Airport.

== Aircraft ==
The aircraft, a Convair 340 registered ZS-BRV, was originally delivered to the United States Air Force (USAF) in 1954 as a C-131D. It was retired from USAF service in 1987 and was stored for five years before its conversion for civilian use and operation by several companies, eventually being acquired by Rovos Air (the aviation division of South African rail operator Rovos Rail), which began using the aircraft for luxury safari trips in South Africa in 2001. The aircraft was retired in 2009 and sat unused until May 2018, when Rovos Air donated it to Dutch aviation museum Aviodrome. The museum had the aircraft restored and painted in the colours of Martin's Air Charter, a Dutch air charter company that operated Convairs in the 1950s (still operating in 2018, as cargo airline Martinair); and plans were made to fly the aircraft to the Netherlands through eastern Africa and central Europe, departing on 12 July.

== Accident ==
The aircraft was operating a test flight in preparation for its delivery flight. Shortly after takeoff, the aircraft's left engine began trailing brown smoke. Footage taken from inside the aircraft shows the engine began to vibrate and fire trailed from its exhaust. The pilots immediately initiated a return to Wonderboom Airport but were unable to complete the manoeuvre and the aircraft crashed into a factory approximately 2 km (1.2 mi) from the airport at about 4:30 pm local time. The flight engineer was killed in the crash and the pilot in command succumbed to his injuries about 18 months after the accident.

== Passengers and crew ==
The aircraft was carrying 16 passengers and had a crew of three: two pilots and a flight engineer.

The two pilots were Australian; Captain Ross Kelly, 65, was a retired Qantas A380 senior check captain, while First Officer Douglas Haywood, 58, was a check-and-training captain for the airline's fleet of Airbus A380s. Both men were members of Australia's Historical Aviation Restoration Society (HARS) and had previously flown another former Rovos Air Convair aircraft to HARS' home base at Illawarra Regional Airport south of Sydney in 2016; and each had over 30 years' flying experience in various aircraft types. The flight engineer, 55-year-old Christo Barnard, was South African.

Passenger nationalities
Nationalities	Passengers	Crew	Total
Australia	1	2	3
Netherlands	3	0	3
South Africa	12	1	13

== Investigation ==
The Accident and Incident Investigations Department of the South African Civil Aviation Authority began an investigation and pledged to have an initial report within 30 days of the crash. A preliminary report was released in August 2018. It said the pilots did not follow the prescribed checklist procedures when they discovered an engine had caught fire. Recovered video footage from the cockpit showed the captain was the pilot flying, while the first officer was doing the radio work. The footage also showed the licensed aircraft maintenance engineer (LAME) operating the engine controls. Further, “during taxi, takeoff and flight, until moments before the crash, one of the passengers was seen standing in the cockpit area behind the LAME. “The GoPro also shows that the pilots were not sure if they had retracted the landing gears, as they can be heard asking each other whether the gears are out or not. It also shows that though the pilots and LAME were informed of the left engine fire, they were asking each other which engine was on fire,” the preliminary report reads. The GoPro footage also showed that “at no stage did the pilots or the LAME discuss or attempt to extinguish the left engine fire, as the left engine fire extinguishing system was never activated”. The preliminary report noted the aircraft was certified for operation by two pilots and it was “not clear why the LAME was allowed to operate the engine controls during the operation of the aircraft” and noted “crew resource management in the cockpit was found lacking”.

The South African Civil Aviation Authority released its final report on 28 August 2019. Indicating that the probable cause of the accident was poor maintenance of the engines and multiple mistakes by unqualified pilots, such as continuing the flight after the left engine had caught fire. Early indications of the engine fault were misdiagnosed by maintenance personnel as an instrument reading erratically.
