= Wonderboom Airport =

Wonderboom Airport Wonderboom Lughawe
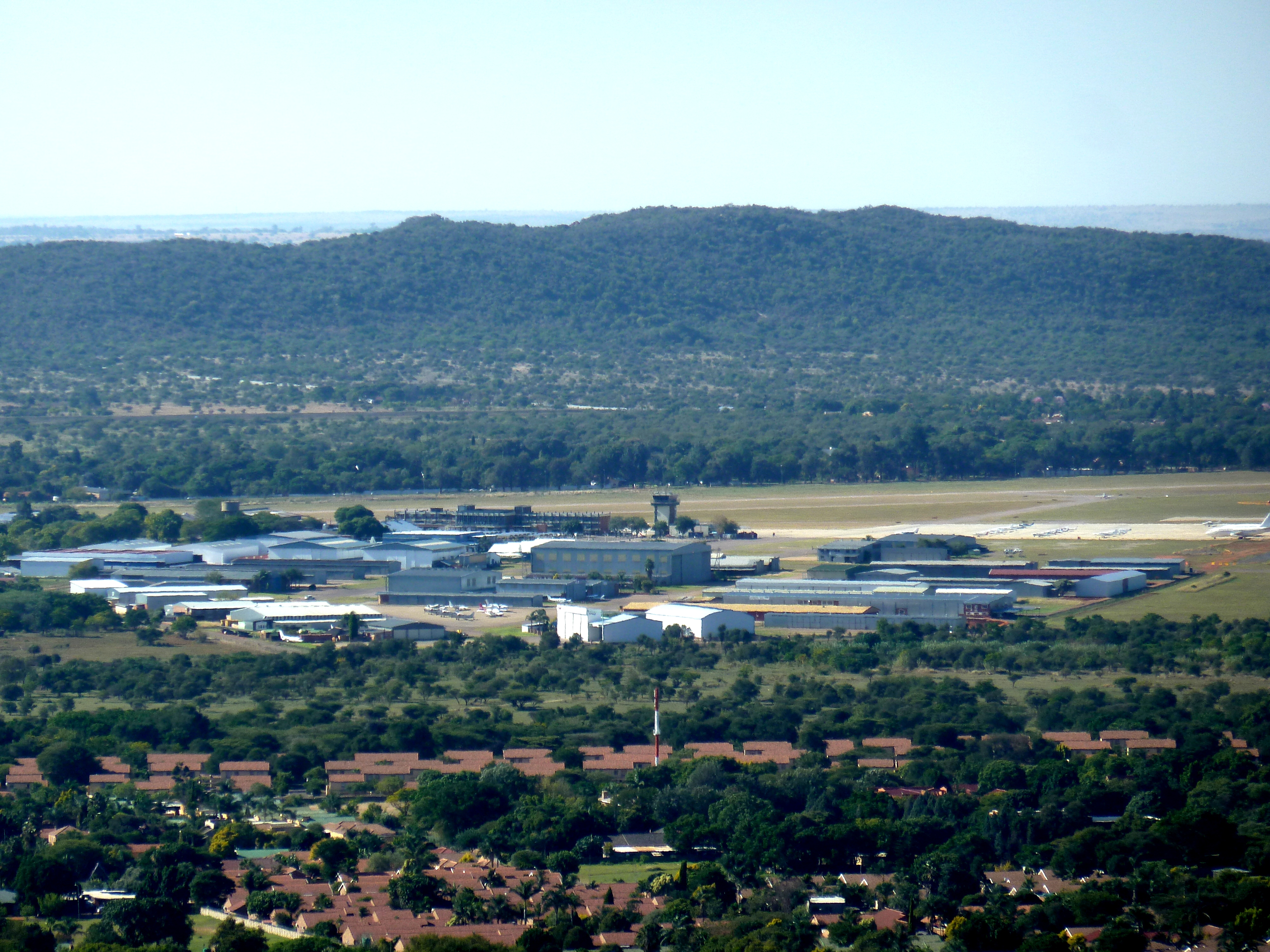
- IATA: PRY; ICAO: FAWB

Summary
- Airport type: Public
- Owner: City of Tshwane Metropolitan Municipality
- Operator: City of Tshwane Metropolitan Municipality
- Serves: Pretoria, South Africa
- Location: Wonderboom, Pretoria
- Elevation AMSL: 1,248 m / 4,095 ft
- Coordinates: 25°39′13″S 28°13′27″E
- Website: wonderboomairport.co.za

Map
- Location of Airport in Gauteng

Runways
Direction	Length		Surface
Direction	m	ft	Surface
06/24	1,280	4,200	Asphalt
11/29	1,828	6,000	Asphalt

Wonderboom Airport (IATA: PRY, ICAO: FAWB) is an airport in Wonderboom, north of Pretoria, South Africa.

== History ==
=== Early years and development ===
The airport was opened in 1937 on the farm Wonderboom, approximately 15 km north of Pretoria. Originally a civilian airstrip for light aircraft, it was used for military training purposes during the Second World War before returning to civilian control in 1945.

In 1965, the airport was extensively expanded, with a new terminal building and hangars being constructed as well as the runways being extended. This led to Wonderboom Airport being able to receive its first Boeing 737 in 1982. In 1993, runway 11/29 was again upgraded to its present length of 1,828 m. Airport management passed from the Pretoria municipality to the Greater Pretoria Metropolitan Council in December 1994, and the City of Tshwane is now the license holder.

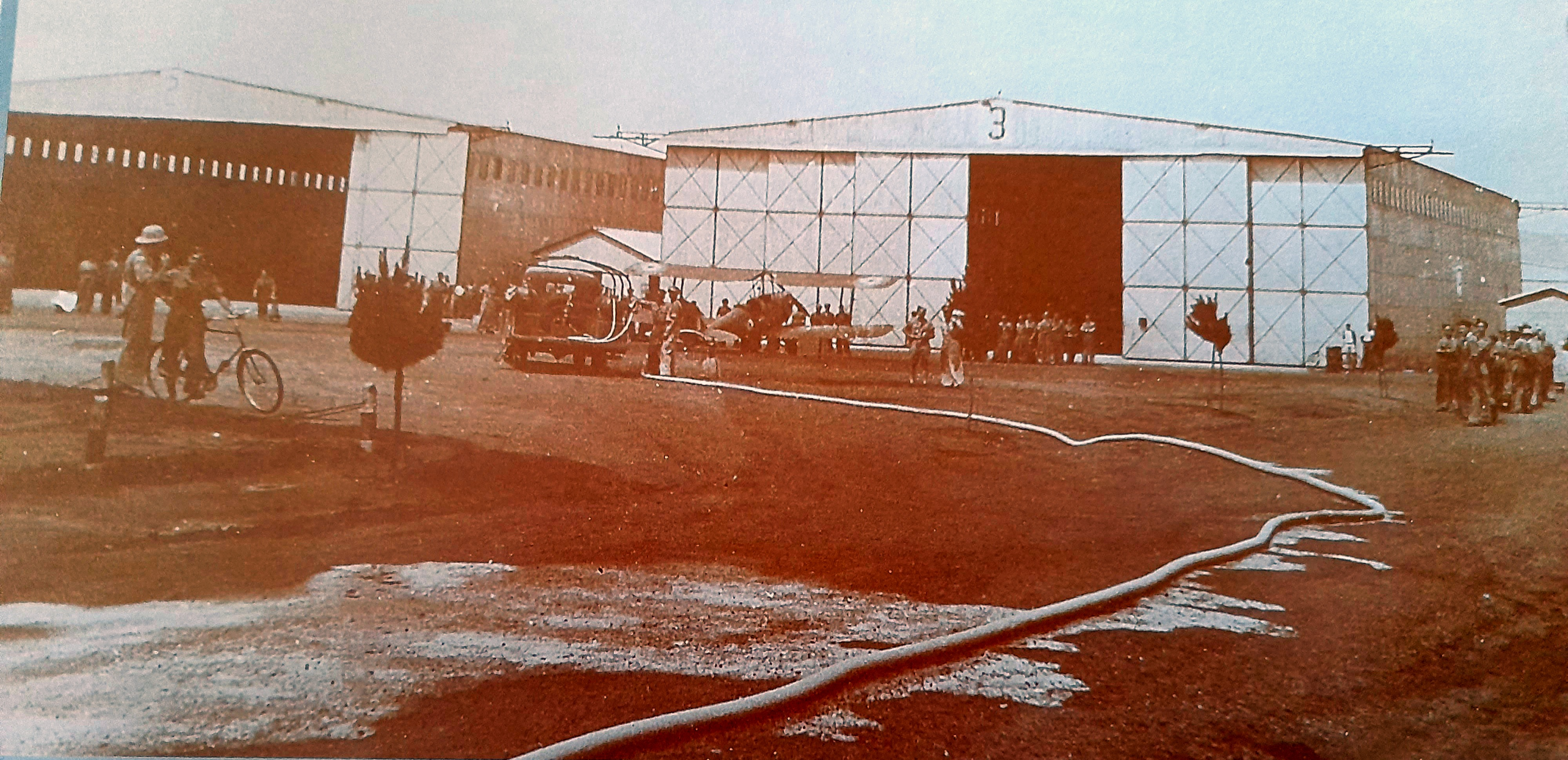
Wonderboom Airport in World War II.

=== Scheduled service history ===
In 2007, the city of Pretoria announced plans for scheduled passenger service from the airport and invested R165.5 million in upgrades. It was estimated that 25-30% of passengers using O. R. Tambo International Airport were Pretoria residents who might prefer a local alternative.

On 16 August 2015, Airlink launched the first scheduled flights from Wonderboom in years, offering service to Cape Town. The airline operated three to four daily flights using 83-seat Avro RJ85 and 37-seat Embraer ERJ135LR aircraft. However, the service was terminated on 8 May 2018, with the airline citing the route's unprofitability.

== Management and Governance ==
=== Management controversy ===
In 2017, the City of Tshwane appointed a private company, Ntiyiso Consulting, to manage the airport. The appointment was made in contravention of municipal procurement rules, leading to operational difficulties which contributed to the airport's later license downgrade. In August 2021, the Gauteng High Court in Pretoria overturned the management contract.

=== Turnaround strategy and revival efforts ===
Following a period of operational and financial challenges, the City of Tshwane initiated an 18-point turnaround strategy structured around three pillars: "arrest, stabilise, and grow". As of October 2022, five of the interventions had been completed. The strategy showed early signs of success, with revenue growing by 64% and net loss margins improving from -230% in the 2020/21 fiscal year to -69%.

In January 2024, the Mayoral Committee approved a new operating model to facilitate private sector involvement in the airport's development. In April 2025, Mayor Nasiphi Moya confirmed the city's commitment to reviving the airport rather than selling it. The revival plans include positioning Wonderboom as a cargo hub, particularly for transporting platinum and manganese from mining areas in Rustenburg and Limpopo. Projections suggest the airport has the potential to handle up to 12% of the traffic from O. R. Tambo International Airport.

== Infrastructure and Regulatory Status ==
=== License status ===
In October 2019, the South African Civil Aviation Authority (SACAA) downgraded Wonderboom Airport's license from a Category 5 to a Category 2 aerodrome. The downgrade was due to unresolved findings from an audit, which highlighted non-compliance issues including "non-visible road markings, debris on runways, leaking water on taxiways and problematic security infrastructure." This prevented the airport from hosting scheduled passenger flights.

After significant corrective action, the airport's license was successfully upgraded back to Category 5 on 8 August 2023, following a positive three-month oversight audit by the SACAA. This cleared the way for the potential resumption of scheduled commercial services.

=== Operational and security issues ===
The airport has faced several operational challenges. In March 2021, night flight operations were temporarily suspended due to faulty runway lighting. While the repairs were completed within a week, similar lighting failures recurred in early 2022.

In 2019, the airport and surrounding area experienced significant crime, including vehicle theft, cable theft targeting critical infrastructure, and challenges from nearby illegal settlements. In response, airport management launched a joint operation with the South African Police Service (SAPS) and Tshwane Metro Police to improve security.

=== Development plans ===
A comprehensive Airport Development Plan was first approved by the City of Tshwane in 2004. The plan proposed extending the main runway to 2,750 meters to accommodate medium-sized aircraft and projected that the upgraded airport could generate R4 billion in private sector investment and create 16,000 permanent jobs. However, implementation of the master plan has been delayed due to funding constraints.

== Accidents and incidents ==
- On 24 August 1998, an Aero Modifications International DC-3-65TP (registration ZS-NKK) operated by Speed Service Couriers crashed on take-off. The aircraft had been undergoing maintenance. Witnesses in the control tower and a passing motorist reported seeing a long flame from the left engine during takeoff, resulting in the engine being engulfed in fire upon impact. During the emergency, the Automatic Power Reserve on the right engine activated to compensate for the power loss from the left engine, causing the aircraft to roll violently. The pilots closed the throttles to try and stop the roll but were at too low an altitude. The wing tip hit the ground, causing the aircraft's nose to strike the ground. One of the two crew members was killed. The aircraft was on a mail flight to Durban International Airport.
- The 2018 Pretoria Convair 340 crash occurred on 10 July, minutes after the aircraft took off from Wonderboom Airport. The Convair was on a training flight with plans for it to be flown to the Netherlands. Two people died in the crash: one of the 19 occupants of the plane and one person on the ground.
