= Rovos Air =

South African charter airline

IATA	ICAO	Call sign
6P	VOS	ROVOS
- Founded: 2002
- Ceased operations: 2014
- Hubs: Wonderboom Airport
- Fleet size: 2
- Headquarters: Randpark Ridge, South Africa

Rovos Air was a charter airline headquartered in Randpark Ridge, South Africa based at Wonderboom Airport.

== History ==
Rovos Air was established in 2002 by Rohan Vos, the owner of Rovos Rail, the operator of the Pride of Africa. The company operated tourist traffic between Pretoria and Victoria Falls offering passengers a nostalgic flight in classic aircraft that were fully refurbished and fitted with luxury seats to match the saloon wagon in their train.

In 2009, Rovos Air was sold to TIM Holdings (PTY) LTD. Rovos Air, trading as Gryphon Airlines, then operating MD-83 and DC-9 aircraft providing charter flights in Africa, the Middle East and South Central Asia. It shut down operations in 2014.

== Fleet ==
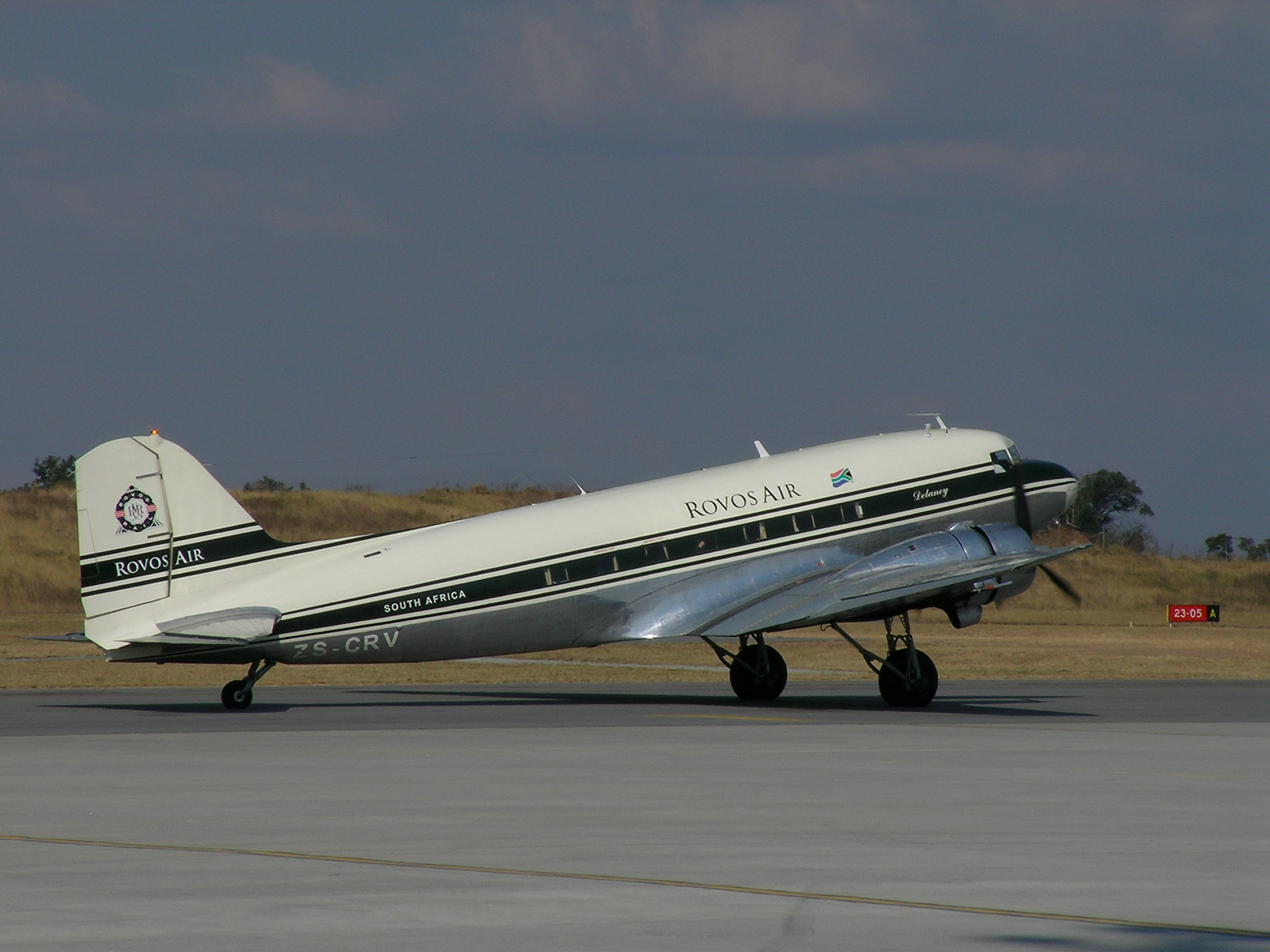
A former Rovos Air Douglas DC-3

The Rovos Air fleet included the following aircraft (as of 1 August 2010):

- 1 Douglas DC-9-32
- 1 McDonnell Douglas MD-82
