= Douglas DC-3 =

Airliner and military transport aircraft family

DC-3
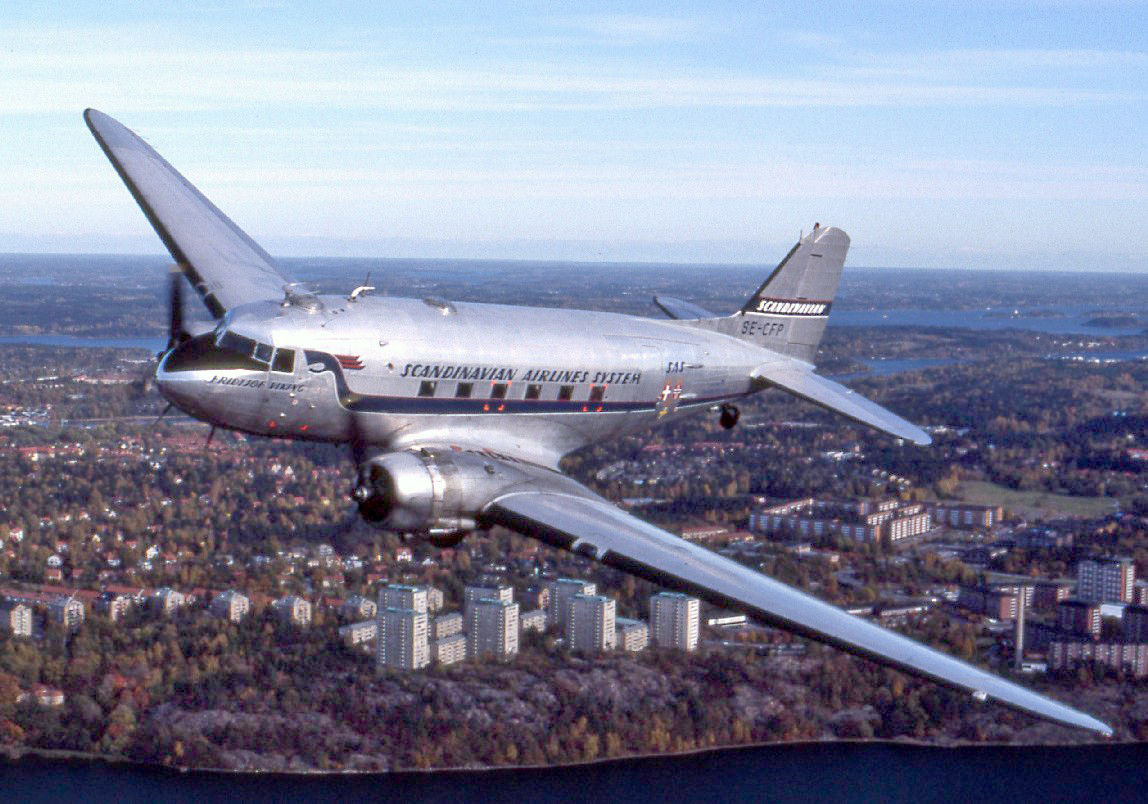
- A DC-3 operated in period Scandinavian Airlines livery by Flygande Veteraner flying over Lidingö, Sweden, in 1989

General information
- Type: Airliner and transport aircraft
- National origin: United States
- Manufacturer: Douglas Aircraft Company
- Status: In service
- Number built: 607

History
- Manufactured: 1936–1942, 1950
- Introduction date: 1936, with American Airlines
- First flight: December 17, 1935
- Developed from: Douglas DC-2
- Variants: Douglas C-47 Skytrain; Douglas R4D-8/C-117D; Lisunov Li-2; Showa/Nakajima L2D; Basler BT-67; Conroy Turbo-Three; Conroy Tri-Turbo-Three

The Douglas DC-3 is a propeller-driven airliner that was manufactured by the Douglas Aircraft Company. It had a lasting effect on the airline industry from the 1930s through World War II. It was developed as a larger, improved, 14-bed sleeper version of the Douglas DC-2. It is a low-wing metal monoplane with conventional landing gear, powered by two radial piston engines of 1,000–1,200 hp (750–890 kW). Although the DC-3s originally built for civil service had the Wright R-1820 Cyclone, later civilian DC-3s used the Pratt & Whitney R-1830 Twin Wasp engine. The DC-3 has a cruising speed of 207 mph (333 km/h), a capacity of 21 to 32 passengers or 6,000 lb (2,700 kg) of cargo, and a range of 1,500 mi (2,400 km); it can operate from short runways.

The DC-3 had many exceptional qualities compared to previous aircraft. It was fast, had a good range, was more reliable, and carried passengers in greater comfort. Before World War II, it pioneered many air travel routes. It was able to cross the continental United States from New York to Los Angeles in 18 hours, with only three stops. It is one of the first airliners that could profitably carry only passengers without relying on mail subsidies. In 1939, at the peak of its dominance in the airliner market, around 90% of airline flights on the planet were by a DC-3 or one of its variants.

Following the war, the airliner market was flooded with surplus transport aircraft, and the DC-3 was no longer competitive because it was smaller and slower than aircraft built during the war. It was made obsolete on main routes by more advanced types such as the Douglas DC-4 and Convair 240, but the design proved adaptable and was still useful on less commercially demanding routes.

Civilian DC-3 production ended in 1943 at 607 aircraft. Military versions, including the C-47 Skytrain (the Dakota in British RAF service), and Soviet- and Japanese-built versions, brought total production to over 16,000. Many continued to be used in a variety of niche roles; 2,000 DC-3s and military derivatives were estimated to be still flying in 2013; by 2017 more than 300 were still flying. As of 2023, it was estimated about 150 were still flying.

== Design and development ==
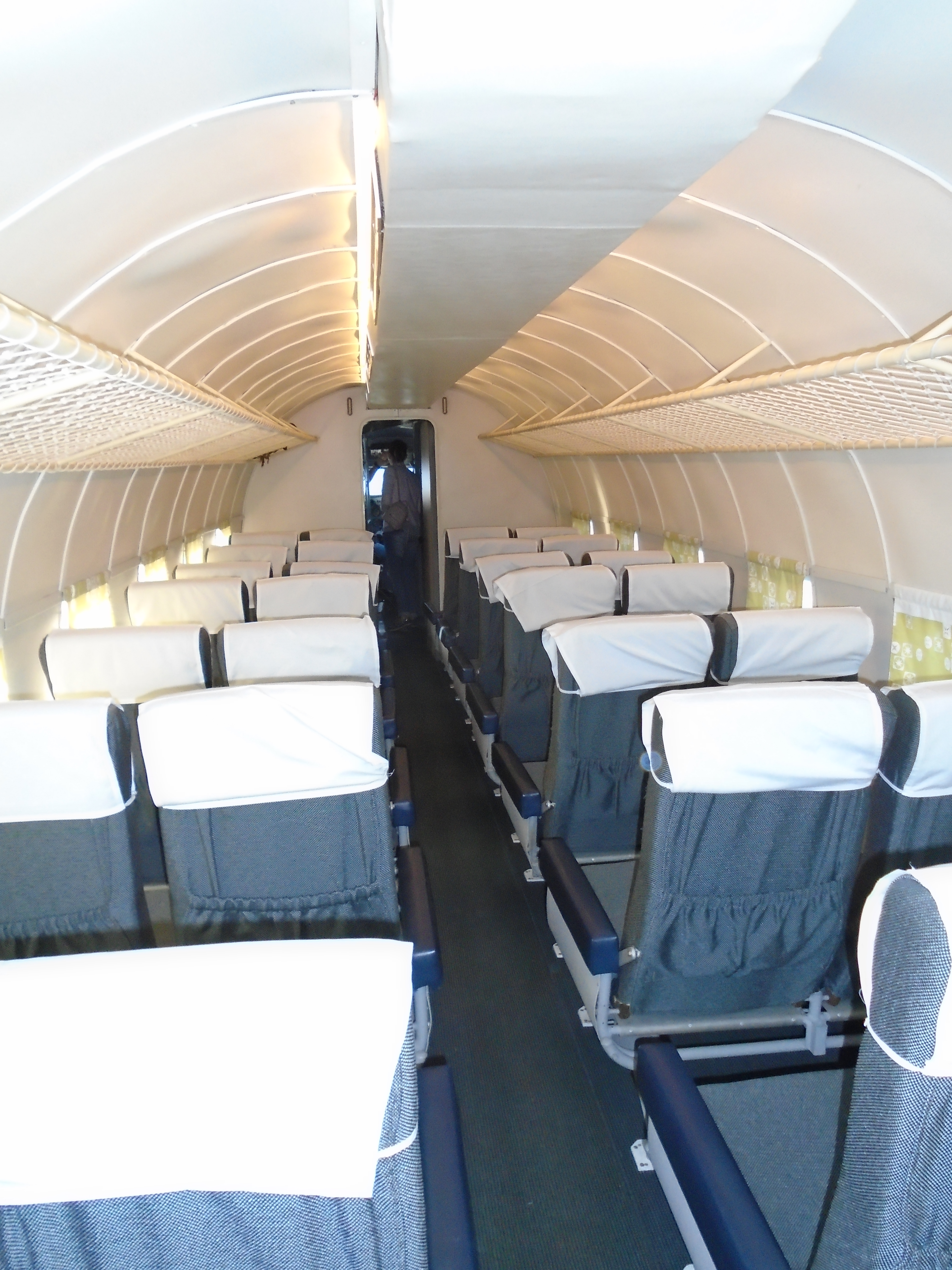
DC-3 airliner cabin

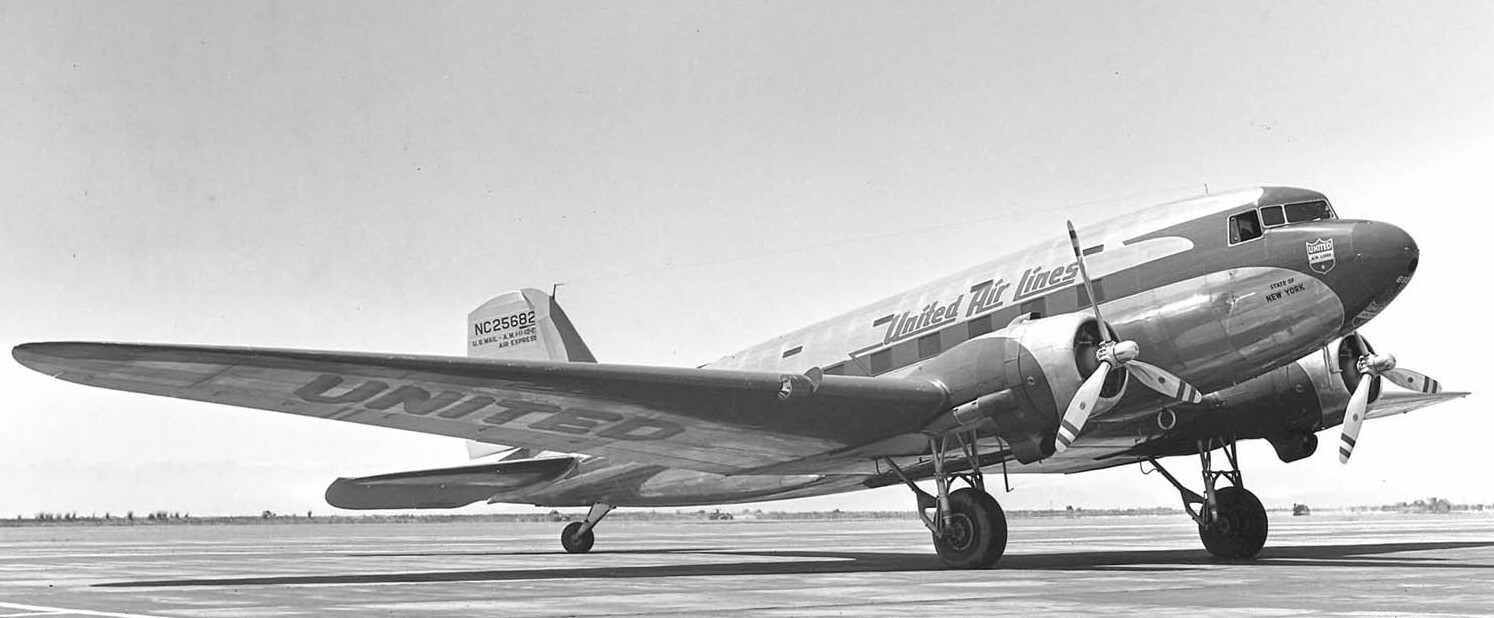
Douglas Sleeper Transport (DST) showing the second row of windows for the upper bunk beds, above the airline titles

"DC" stands for Douglas Commercial. The DC-3 was the culmination of a development effort that began after an inquiry from Transcontinental and Western Airlines (TWA) to Donald Douglas. TWA's rival in transcontinental air service, United Airlines, was starting service with the Boeing 247, and Boeing refused to sell any 247s to other airlines until United's order for 60 aircraft had been filled. TWA asked Douglas to design and build an aircraft that would allow TWA to compete with United. Douglas' design, the 1933 DC-1, was promising, and led to the DC-2 in 1934. The DC-2 was a success, but with room for improvement.

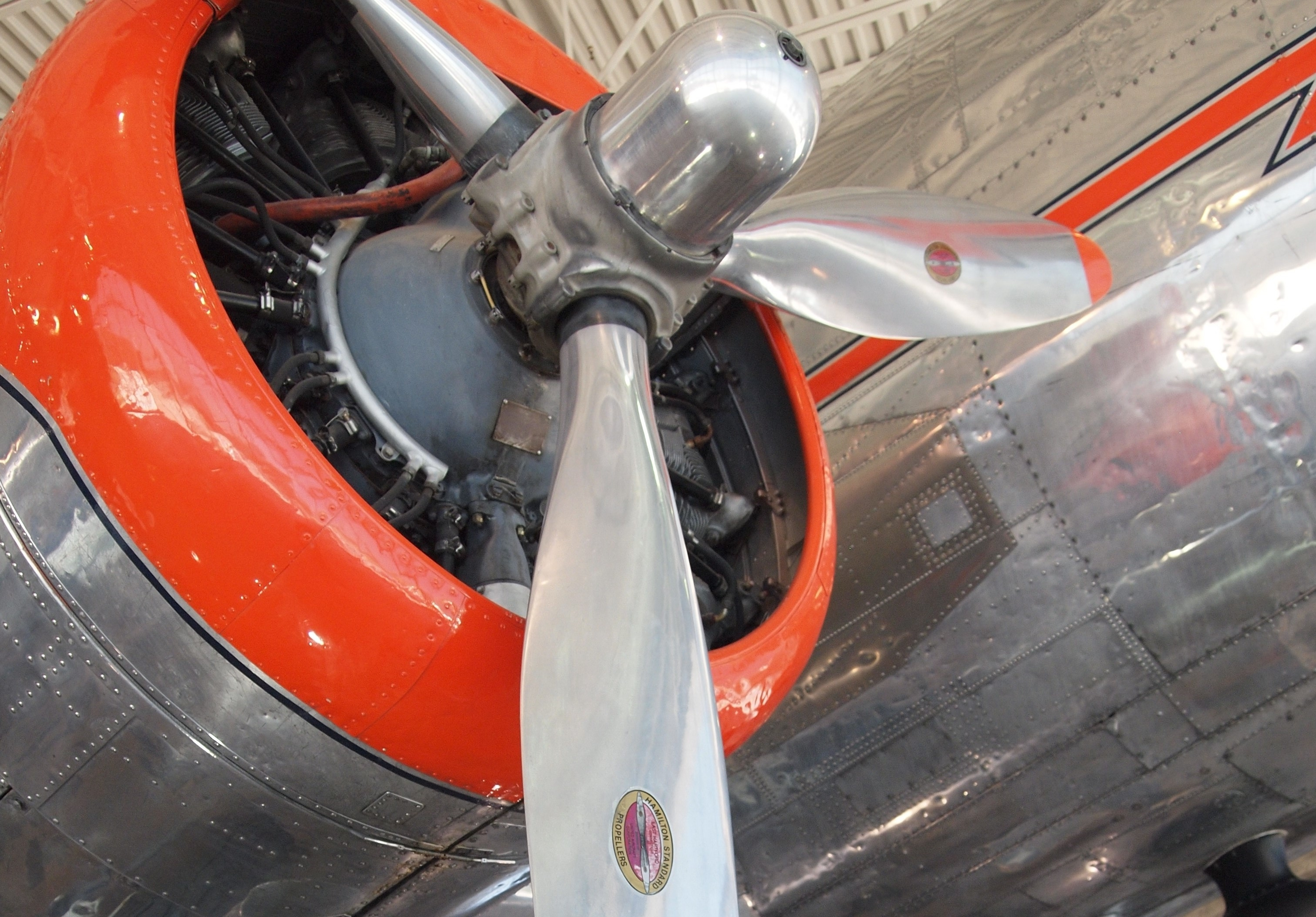
Wright R-1820 Cyclone 9 engine of American Airlines Flagship Knoxville

The DC-3 resulted from a marathon telephone call from American Airlines CEO C. R. Smith to Donald Douglas, when Smith persuaded a reluctant Douglas to design a sleeper aircraft based on the DC-2 to replace American's Curtiss Condor II biplanes. The DC-2's cabin was 66 inches (1.7 m) wide, too narrow for side-by-side berths. Douglas agreed to go ahead with development only after Smith informed him of American's intention to purchase 20 aircraft. The new aircraft was engineered by a team led by chief engineer Arthur E. Raymond over the next two years, and the prototype Douglas Sleeper Transport (DST) first flew on December 17, 1935 (the 32nd anniversary of the Wright Brothers' flight at Kitty Hawk) with Douglas chief test pilot Carl Cover at the controls. Its cabin was 92 in (2,300 mm) wide, and a version with 21 seats instead of the 14–16 sleeping berths of the DST was given the designation DC-3. No prototype was built, and the first DC-3 built followed seven DSTs off the production line for delivery to American Airlines.

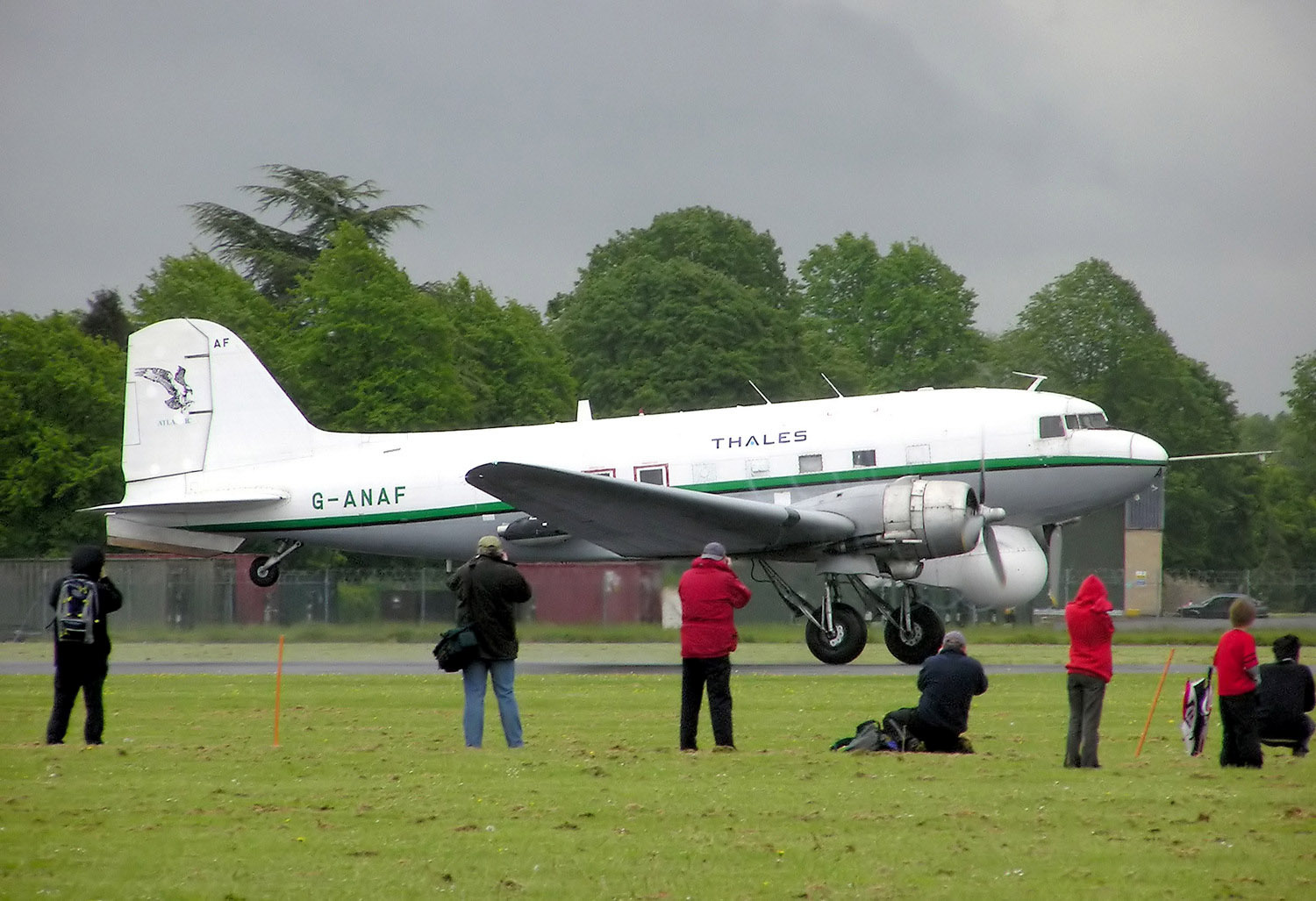
Ex-military Air Atlantique C-47B at RAF Hullavington in 2005

The DC-3 and DST popularized air travel in the United States. Eastbound transcontinental flights could cross the U.S. in about 15 hours with three refueling stops, while westbound trips against the wind took 17 1/2 hours. A few years earlier, such a trip entailed short hops in slower and shorter-range aircraft during the day, coupled with train travel overnight.

Several radial engines were offered for the DC-3. Early-production civilian aircraft used either the 9-cylinder Wright R-1820 Cyclone 9 or the 14-cylinder Pratt & Whitney R-1830 Twin Wasp, but the Twin Wasp was chosen for most military versions and was also used by most DC-3s converted from military service. Five DC-3S Super DC-3s with Pratt & Whitney R-2000 Twin Wasps were built in the late 1940s, three of which entered airline service.

=== Production ===
Total production including all military variants was 16,079. More than 400 remained in commercial service in 1998. Production was:

- 607 civilian variants
- 10,048 military C-47 and C-53 derivatives built at Santa Monica, California, Long Beach, California, and Oklahoma City
- 4,937 built under license in the Soviet Union (1939–1950) as the Lisunov Li-2 (NATO reporting name: Cab)
- 487 Mitsubishi Kinsei-engined aircraft built by Showa and Nakajima in Japan (1939–1945), as the L2D Type 0 transport (Allied codename Tabby)

Production of DSTs ended in mid-1941 and civilian DC-3 production ended in early 1943, although dozens of the DSTs and DC-3s ordered by airlines that were produced between 1941 and 1943 were pressed into the US military service while still on the production line. Military versions were produced until the end of the war in 1945. A larger, more powerful Super DC-3 was launched in 1949 to positive reviews. The civilian market was flooded with second-hand C-47s, many of which were converted to passenger and cargo versions. Only five Super DC-3s were built, and three of them were delivered for commercial use. The prototype Super DC-3 served the US Navy with the designation YC-129 alongside 100 R4Ds that had been upgraded to the Super DC-3 specifications.

=== Turboprop conversions ===
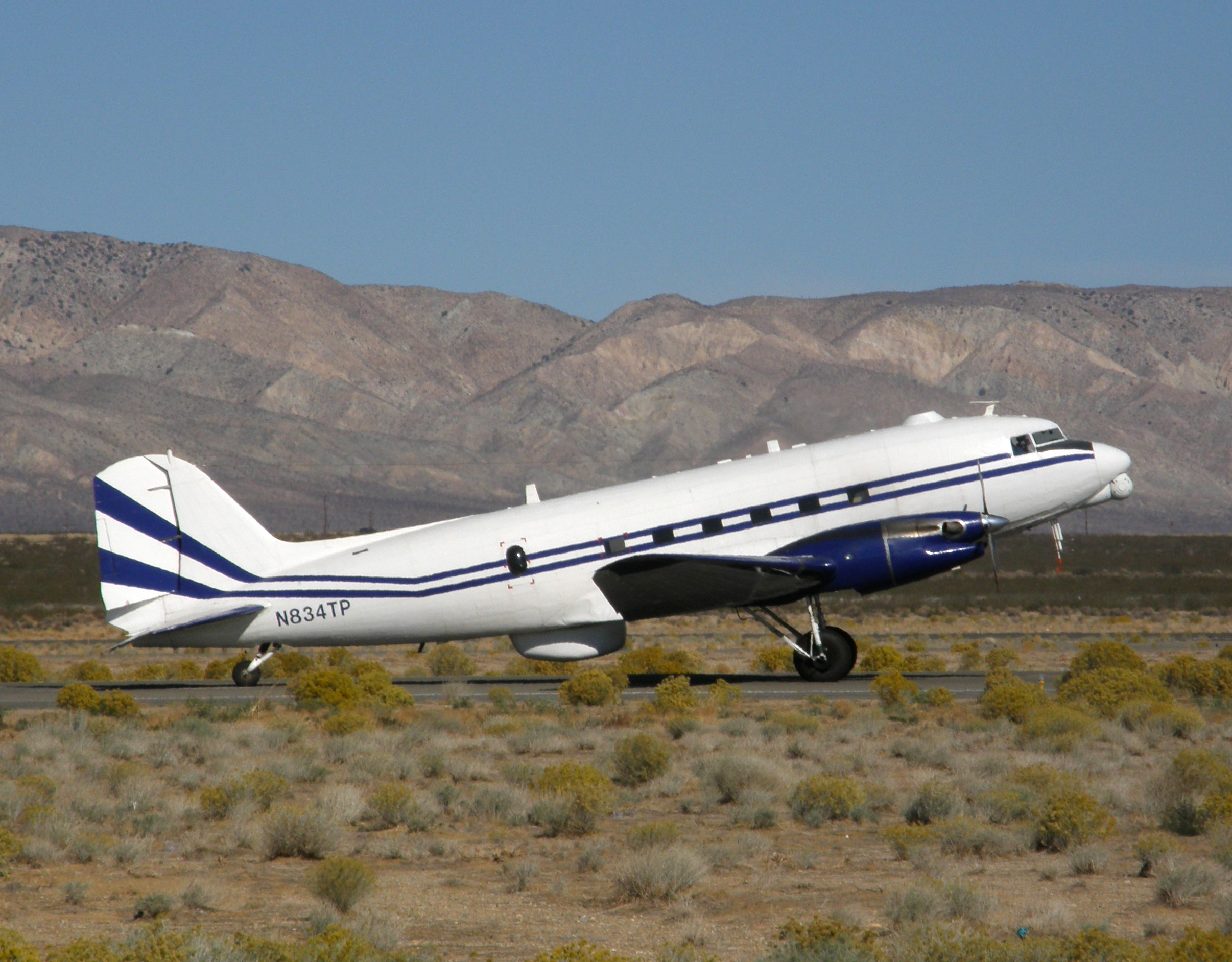
BSAS C-47–65ARTP powered by Pratt & Whitney Canada PT6-65AR turboprop engines

From the early 1950s, some DC-3s were modified to use Rolls-Royce Dart engines, as in the Conroy Turbo Three. Other conversions featured Armstrong Siddeley Mamba or Pratt & Whitney PT6A turbines.

The Greenwich Aircraft Corp DC-3-TP is a conversion with an extended fuselage and with Pratt & Whitney Canada PT6A-65AR or PT6A-67R engines fitted.

The Basler BT-67 is a conversion of the DC-3/C-47. Basler refurbishes C-47s and DC-3s at Oshkosh, Wisconsin, fitting them with Pratt & Whitney Canada PT6A-67R turboprop engines, lengthening the fuselage by 40 in (1,000 mm) with a fuselage plug ahead of the wing, and some local strengthening of the airframe.

South Africa-based Braddick Specialised Air Services International (commonly referred to as BSAS International) has also performed Pratt & Whitney PT6 turboprop conversions, having performed modifications on over 50 DC-3/C-47s / 65ARTP / 67RTP / 67FTPs.

== Operational history ==
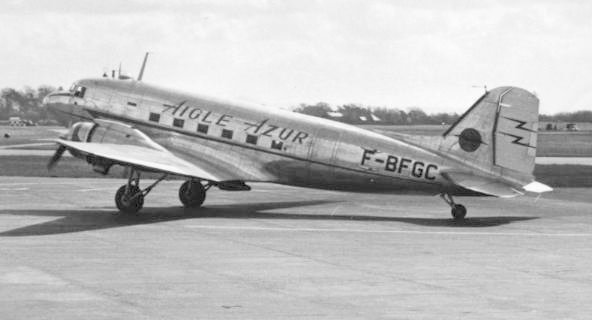
Aigle Azur (France) Douglas C-47B in 1953, with a ventral Turbomeca Palas booster jet for hot and high operations

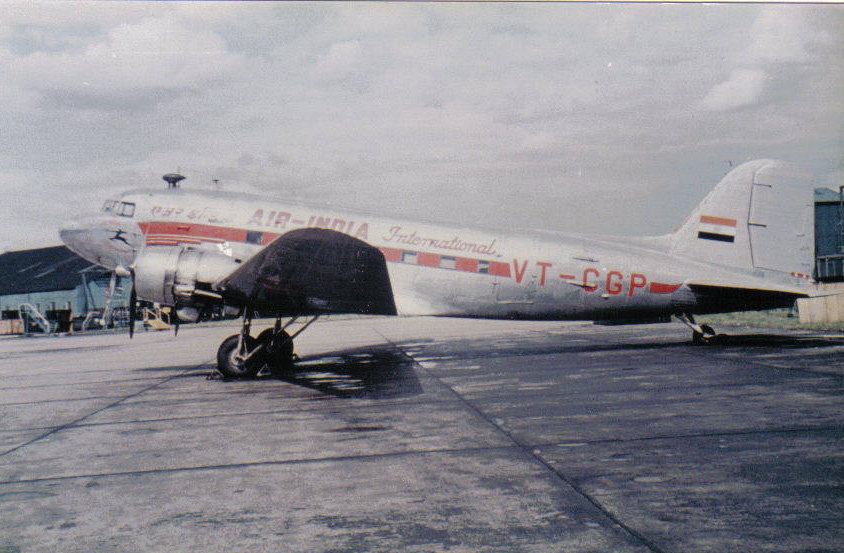
Air India DC-3 at London Heathrow Airport in 1958

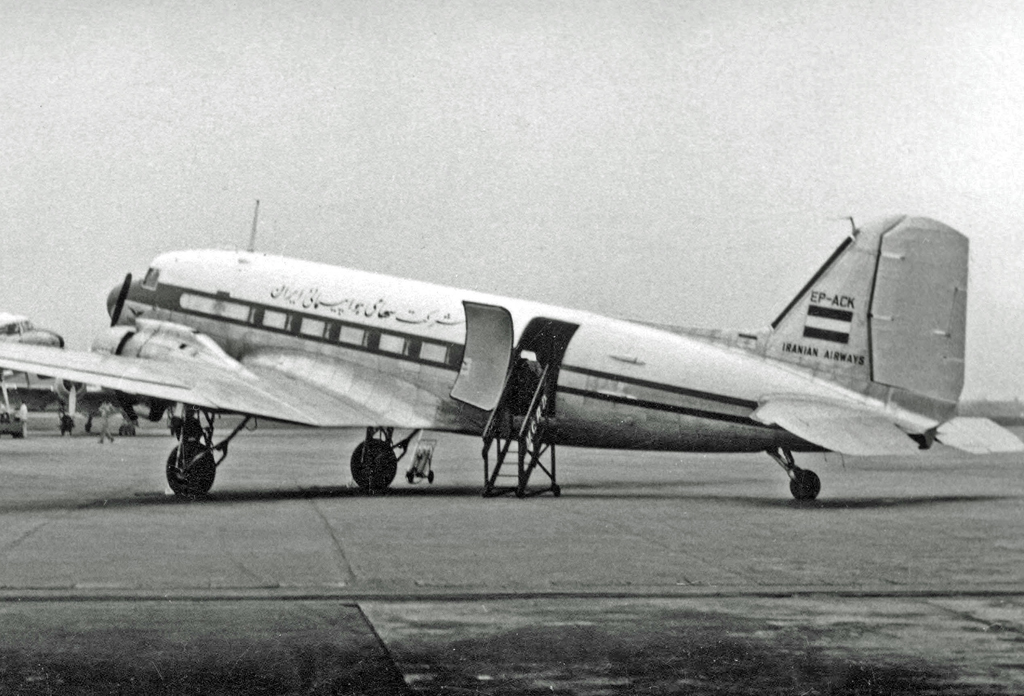
Iranian National Airways DC-3 in 1954

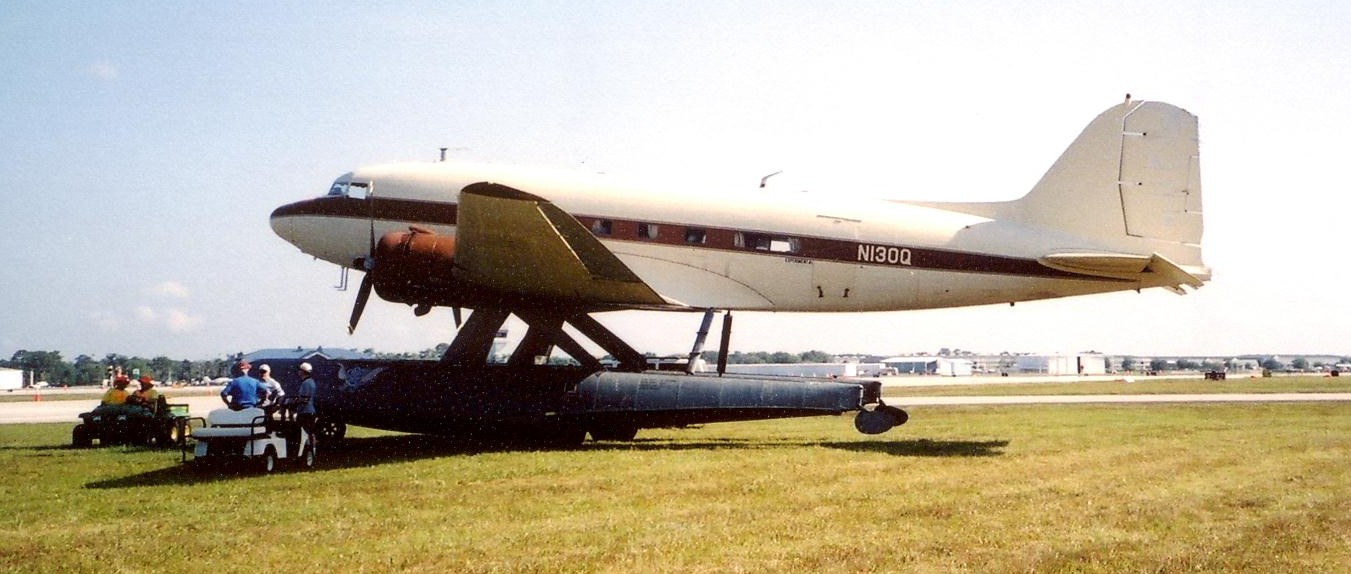
Amphibious DC-3 on EDO floats in 2003

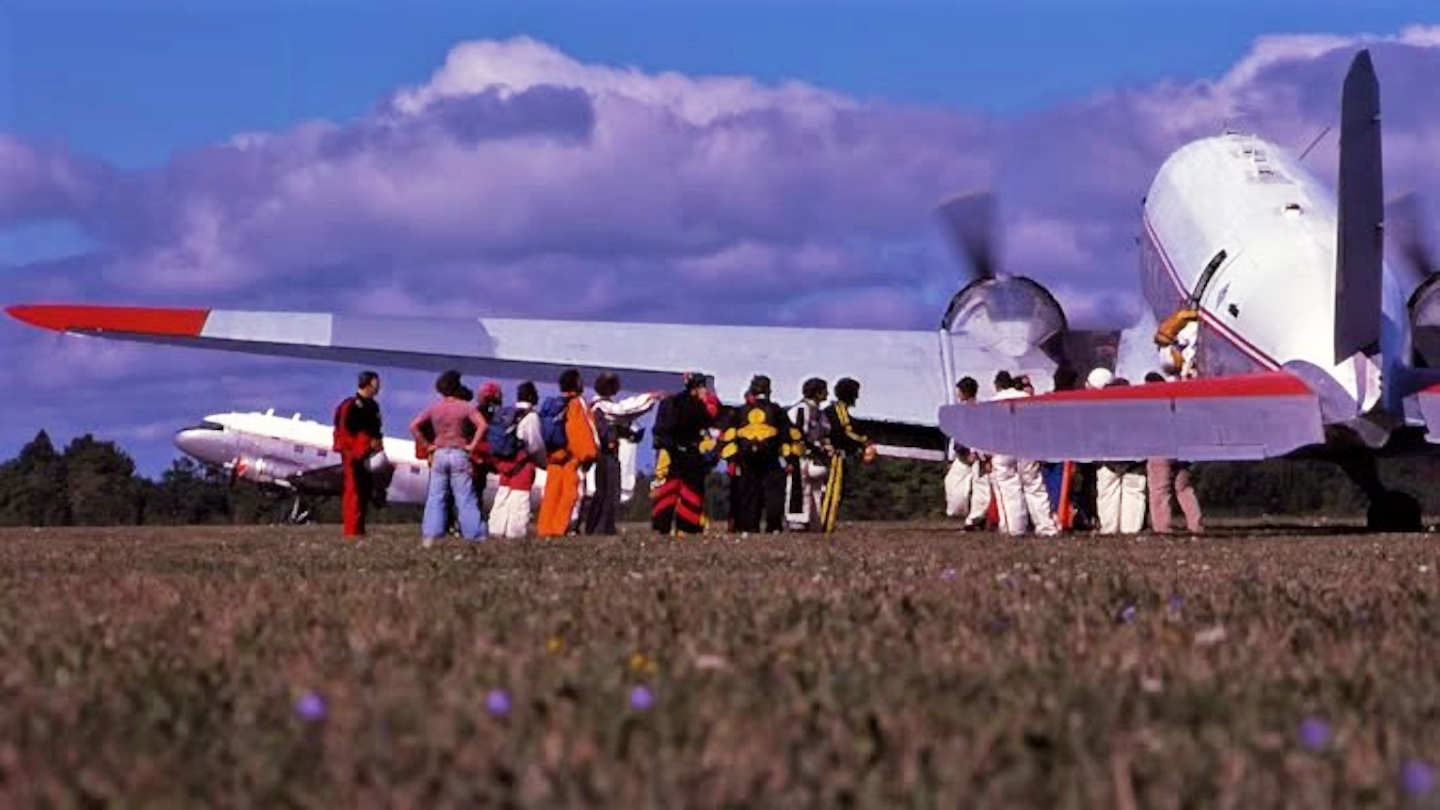
Two C-47s – one boarding skydivers, while another taxis by, 1977

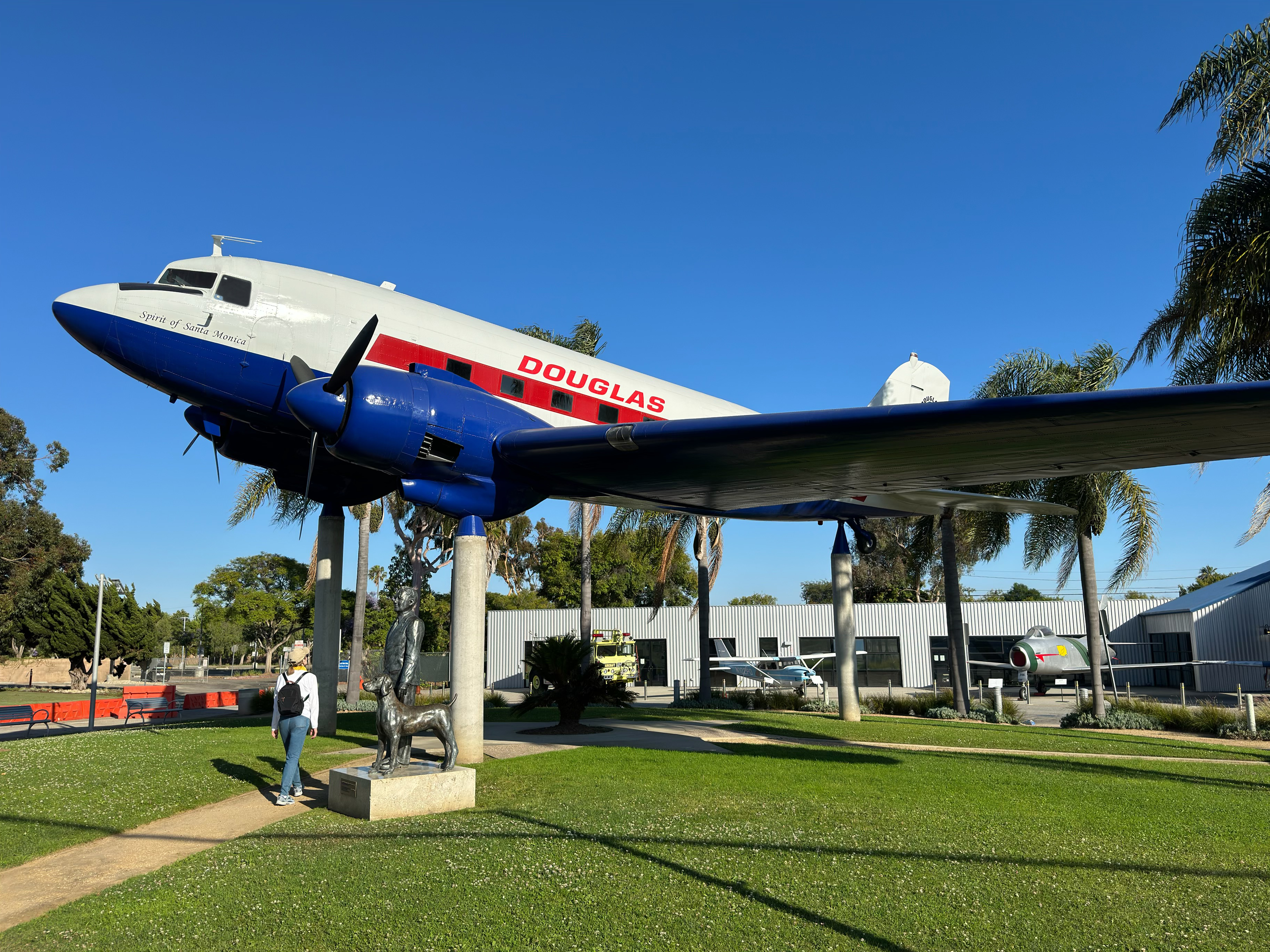
Douglas DC-3 built in 1942 as a 28-seat paratroop carrier and glider tug. Retired from military service in 1946, on display at Museum of Flying, Santa Monica Airport, California in 2024

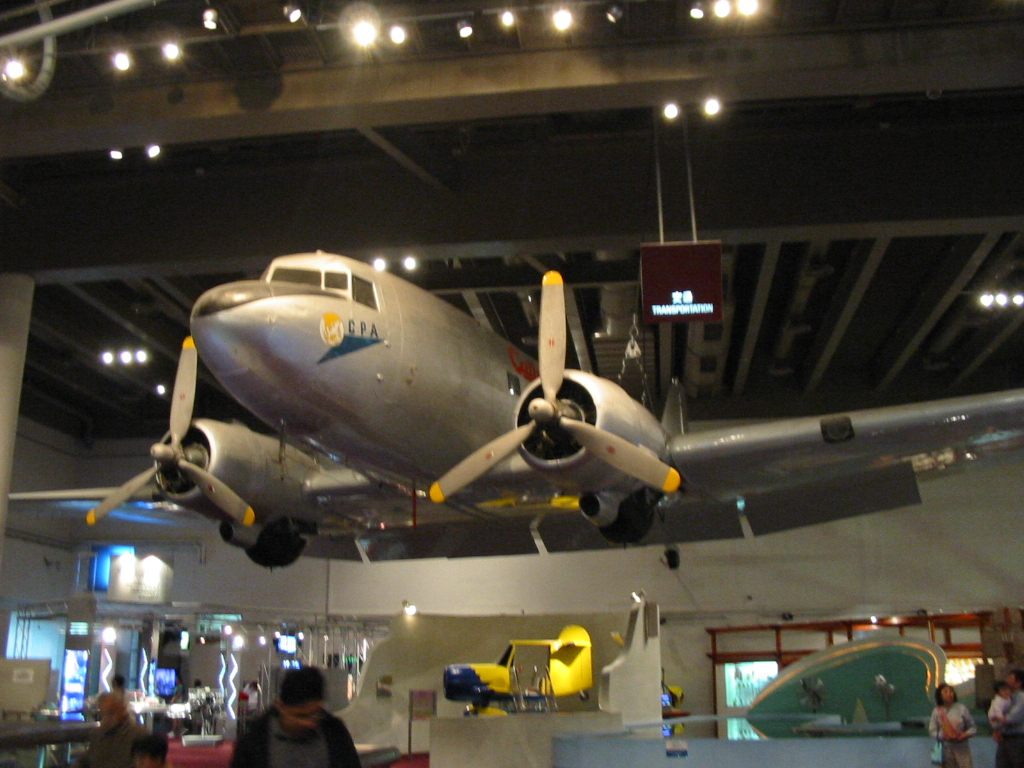
DC-3 Betsy inaugurated operations with Cathay Pacific in 1946; now in the Hong Kong Science Museum

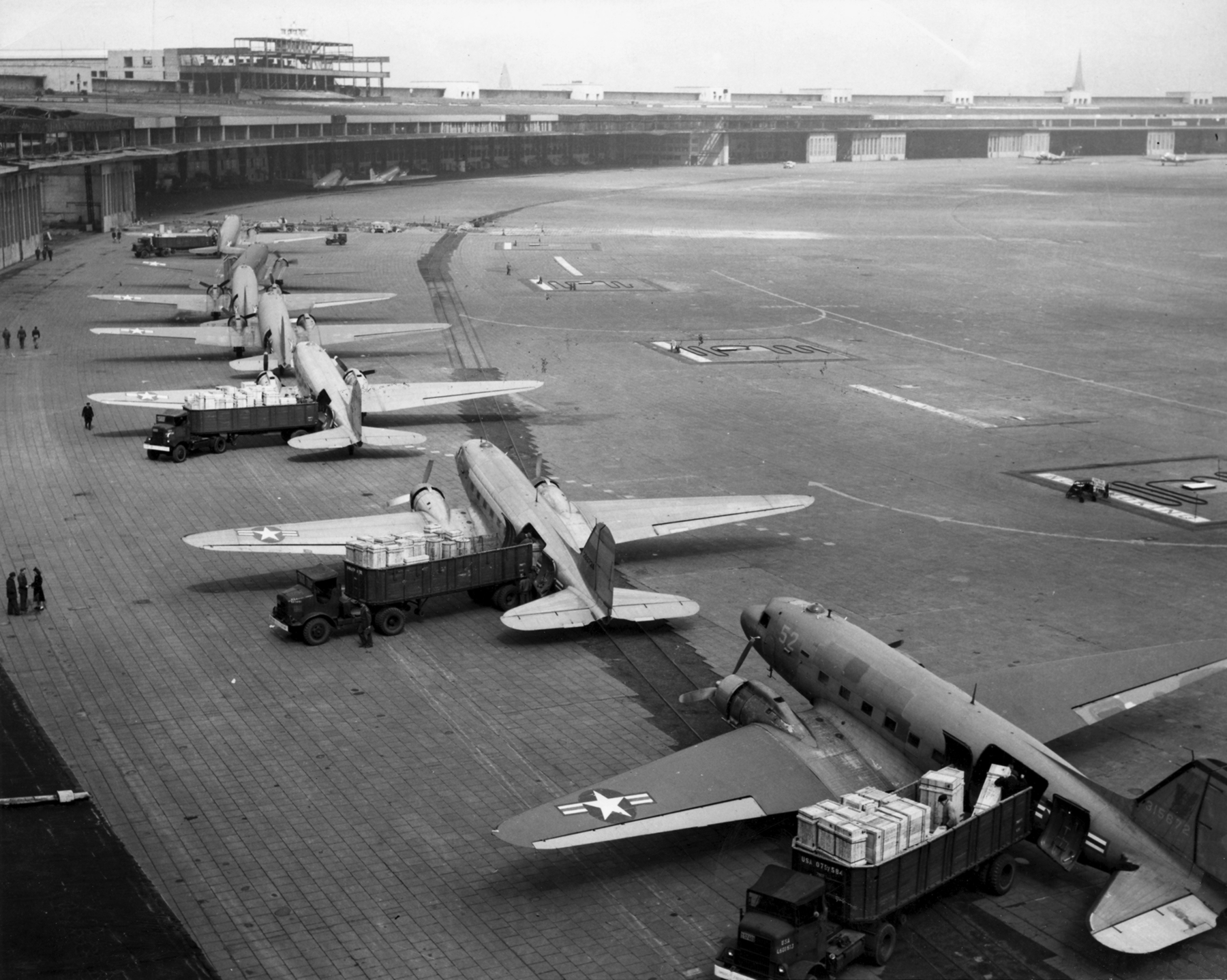
C-47 Skytrains during the Berlin Airlift

American Airlines inaugurated passenger service on June 26, 1936, with simultaneous flights from Newark, New Jersey and Chicago, Illinois. Early U.S. airlines like American, United, TWA, Eastern, and Delta ordered over 400 DC-3s. These fleets paved the way for the modern American air travel industry, which eventually replaced trains as the most common means of long-distance travel across the United States. A nonprofit group, Flagship Detroit Foundation, continues to operate the only original American Airlines Flagship DC-3 with air show and airport visits throughout the U.S.

In 1936, KLM Royal Dutch Airlines received its first DC-3, which replaced the DC-2 in service from Amsterdam via Batavia (now Jakarta) to Sydney, by far the world's longest scheduled route at the time. In total, KLM bought 23 DC-3s before the war broke out in Europe. In 1941, a China National Aviation Corporation (CNAC) DC-3 pressed into wartime transportation service was bombed on the ground at Suifu Airfield in China, destroying the outer right wing. The only spare available was that of a smaller Douglas DC-2 in CNAC's workshops. The DC-2's right wing was removed, flown to Suifu under the belly of another CNAC DC-3, and bolted up to the damaged aircraft. After a single test flight, in which it was discovered that it pulled to the right due to the difference in wing sizes, the so-called DC-2½ was flown to safety.

During World War II, many civilian DC-3s were requisitioned for the war effort and more than 10,000 U.S. military versions of the DC-3 were built, under the designations C-47, C-53, R4D, and Dakota. Peak production was reached in 1944, with 4,853 being delivered. The armed forces of many countries used the DC-3 and its military variants for the transport of troops, cargo, and wounded. Licensed copies of the DC-3 were built in Japan as the Showa L2D (487 aircraft); and in the Soviet Union as the Lisunov Li-2 (4,937 aircraft).

After the war, thousands of cheap ex-military DC-3s became available for civilian use. Cubana de Aviación became the first Latin American airline to offer a scheduled service to Miami when it started its first scheduled international service from Havana in 1945 with a DC-3. Cubana used DC-3s on some domestic routes well into the 1960s.

Douglas developed an improved version, the Super DC-3, with more power, greater cargo capacity, and an improved wing, but with surplus aircraft available for cheap, they failed to sell well in the civilian aviation market. Only five were delivered, three of them to Capital Airlines. The U.S. Navy had 100 of its early R4Ds converted to Super DC-3 standard during the early 1950s as the Douglas R4D-8/C-117D. The last U.S. Navy C-117 was retired on July 12, 1976. The last U.S. Marine Corps C-117, serial 50835, was retired from active service during June 1982. Several remained in service with small airlines in North and South America in 2006.

The United States Forest Service used the DC-3 for smoke jumping and general transportation until the last example was retired in December 2015.

A number of aircraft companies attempted to design a "DC-3 replacement" over the next three decades (including the very successful Fokker F27 Friendship), but no single type could match the versatility, rugged reliability, and economy of the DC-3. While newer airliners soon replaced it on longer high-capacity routes, it remained a significant part of air transport systems well into the 1970s as a regional airliner before being replaced by early regional jets.

One notable operator, Provincetown-Boston Airlines, operated DC-3s until the late 80s, including regional contracts for some of the earliest DC-3 customers such as Eastern. Some DC-3s, including ones originally delivered to Eastern when new, flew in Eastern's final livery before the airline's bankruptcy in 1991.

=== DC-3 in the 21st century ===
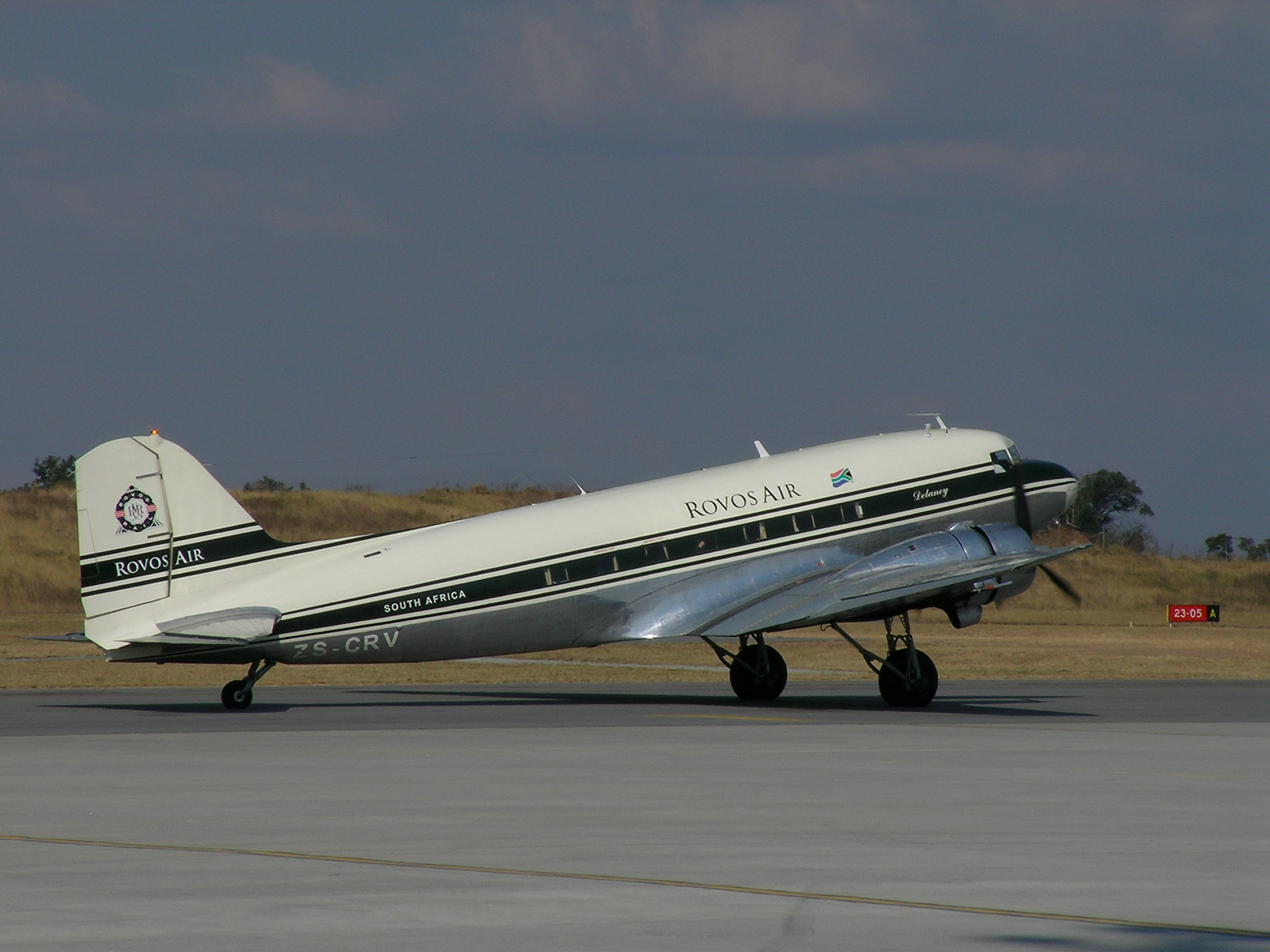
Rovos Air C-47A operating in South Africa, 2006

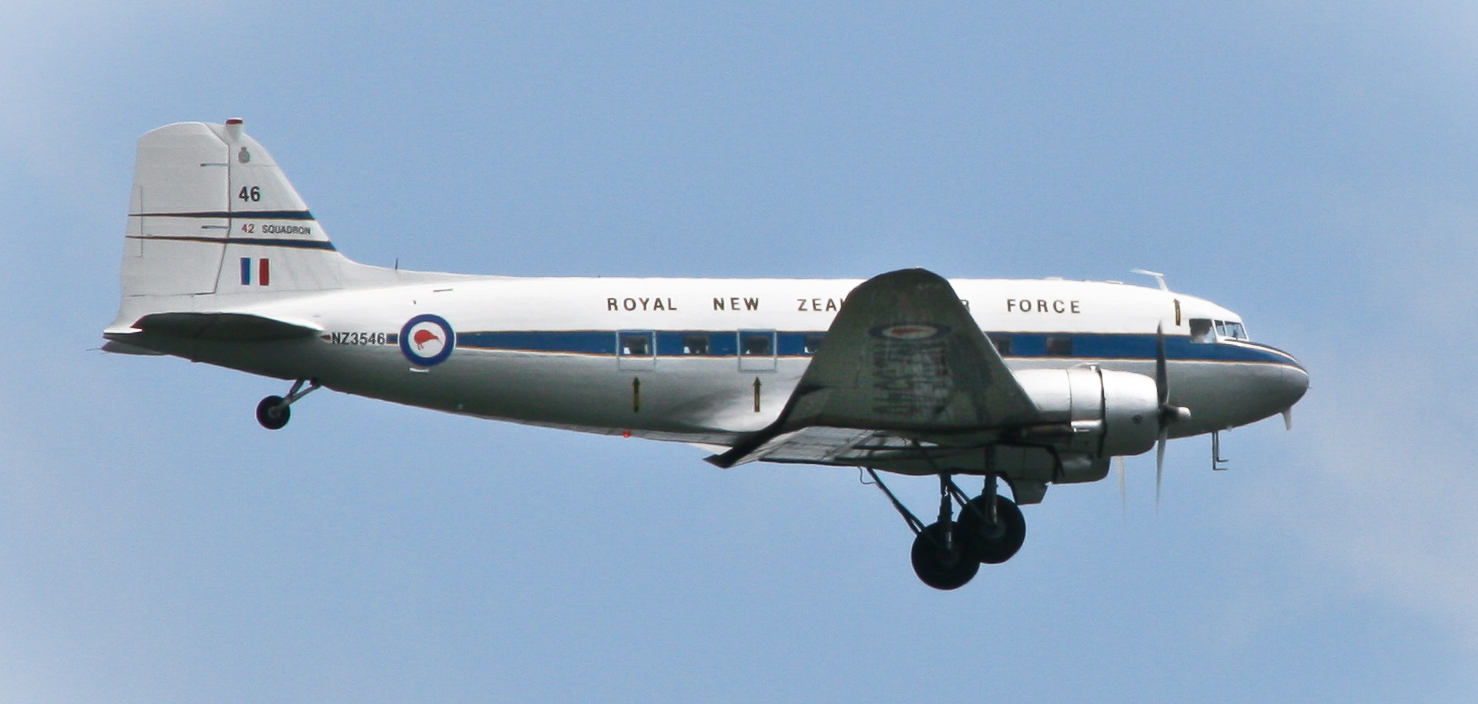
DC-3 flown as a warbird, previously flew for the Royal New Zealand Air Force and New Zealand's National Airways Corporation.

Perhaps unique among prewar aircraft, the DC-3 continues to fly in active commercial and military service as of 2025, ninety years after the type's first flight in 1935. However, the number is dwindling due to maintenance costs, age, and insurance costs. There are small operators with DC-3s in revenue service and as cargo aircraft or as air charters. Applications of the DC-3 have included passenger service, aerial spraying, freight transport, military transport, missionary flying, skydiver shuttling and sightseeing. There have been a very large number of civil and military operators of the DC-3/C-47 and related types, which would have made it impracticable to provide a comprehensive listing of all operators.

A common saying among aviation enthusiasts and pilots is "the only replacement for a DC-3 is another DC-3". Its ability to use grass or dirt runways makes it popular in developing countries or remote areas, where runways may be unpaved.

The oldest surviving DST is N133D, the sixth Douglas Sleeper Transport built, manufactured in 1936. This aircraft was delivered to American Airlines on 12 July 1936 as NC16005. In 2011 it was at Shell Creek Airport, Punta Gorda, Florida. It has been repaired and has been flying again, as recently as 25 April 2021. The oldest DC-3 still flying is the original American Airlines Flagship Detroit (c/n 1920, the 43rd aircraft off the Santa Monica production line, delivered on 2 March 1937), which appears at airshows around the United States and is owned and operated by the Flagship Detroit Foundation. The last DC-3 flying in regular scheduled passenger service was, as of 2026, flown by Aerolíneas del Llano in Colombia.

The base price of a new DC-3 in 1936 was around $60,000–$80,000, and by 1960 used aircraft were available for $75,000. In 2023, flying DC-3s can be bought from $400,000-$700,000.

As of 2024, the Basler BT-67 with additions to handle cold weather and snow runways was used in Antarctica, including regularly landing at the South Pole during the austral summer.

== Variants ==
=== Civil ===
DST
Douglas Sleeper Transport; the initial variant with two 1,000–1,200-horsepower (750–890 kW) Wright R-1820 Cyclone engines and standard sleeper accommodation for up to 16 with small upper windows, convertible to carry up to 24 day passengers.
DST-A
DST with 1,000–1,200 hp (750–890 kW) Pratt & Whitney R-1830 Twin Wasp engines
DC-3
Initial non-sleeper variant; with 21 day-passenger seats, 1,000–1,200 hp (750–890 kW) Wright R-1820 Cyclone engines, no upper windows.
DC-3A
DC-3 with 1,000–1,200 hp (750–890 kW) Pratt & Whitney R-1830 Twin Wasp engines.
DC-3B
Version of DC-3 for TWA, with two 1,100–1,200 hp (820–890 kW) Wright R-1820 Cyclone engines and smaller convertible sleeper cabin forward with fewer upper windows than DST.
DC-3C

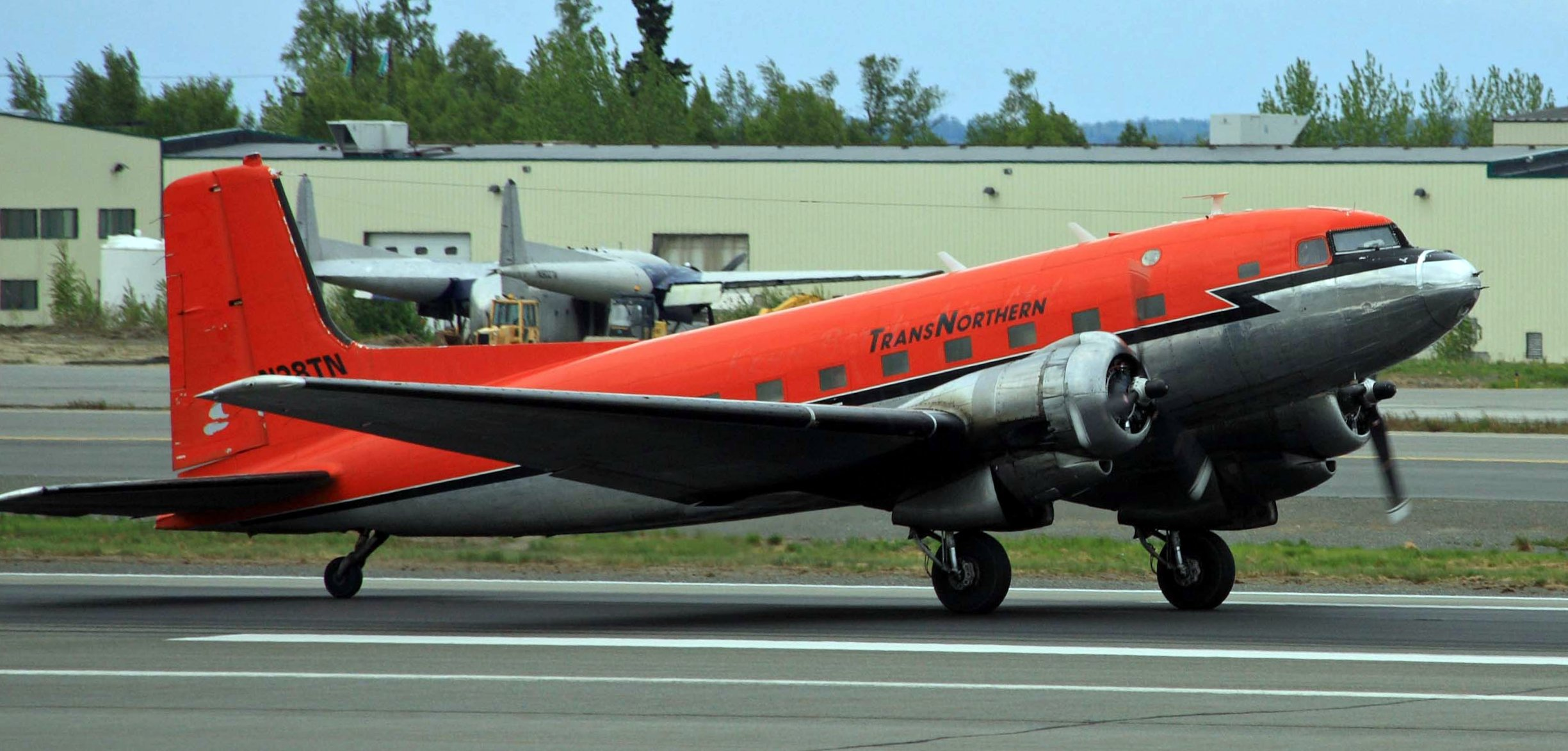
TransNorthern Super DC-3 (C-117D) in Anchorage, Alaska

Designation for ex-military C-47, C-53, and R4D aircraft rebuilt by Douglas Aircraft in 1946, given new manufacturer numbers, and sold on the civil market; Pratt & Whitney R-1830 engines.
DC-3D
Designation for 28 new aircraft completed by Douglas in 1946 with unused components from the cancelled USAAF C-117 production line; Pratt & Whitney R-1830 engines.
DC-3S
Also known as Super DC-3, substantially redesigned DC-3 with fuselage lengthened by 39 inches (1.0 m); outer wings of a different shape with squared-off wingtips and shorter span; distinctive taller rectangular tail; and fitted with more powerful Pratt & Whitney R-2000 or 1,475 hp (1,100 kW) Wright R-1820 Cyclone engines. Five completed by Douglas for civil use using existing surplus secondhand airframes. Three Super DC-3s were operated by Capital Airlines 1950–1952. Designation also used for examples of the 100 R4Ds that had been converted by Douglas to this standard for the U.S. Navy as R4D-8s (later designated C-117Ds), all fitted with more powerful Wright R-1820 Cyclone engines, some of which entered civil use after retirement from military service.

=== Military ===
C-41, C-41A
The C-41 was the first DC-3 to be ordered by the USAAC and was powered by two 1,200 hp (890 kW) Pratt & Whitney R-1830-21 engines. It was delivered in October 1938 for use by United States Army Air Corps (USAAC) chief General Henry H. Arnold with the passenger cabin fitted out in a 14-seat VIP configuration. The C-41A was a single VIP DC-3A supplied to the USAAC in September 1939, also powered by R-1830-21 engines; and used by the Secretary of War. The forward cabin converted to sleeper configuration with upper windows similar to the DC-3B.
C-48
Various DC-3A and DST models; 36 impressed as C-48, C-48A, C-48B, and C-48C
- C-48 1 impressed ex-United Airlines DC-3A
- C-48A 3 impressed DC-3As with 18-seat interiors
- C-48B 16 impressed ex-United Airlines DST-A air ambulances with 16-berth interiors
- C-48C 16 impressed DC-3As with 21-seat interiors
C-49
Various DC-3 and DST models; 138 impressed into service as C-49, C-49A, C-49B, C-49C, C-49D, C-49E, C-49F, C-49G, C-49H, C-49J, and C-49K
C-50
Various DC-3 models, fourteen impressed as C-50, C-50A, C-50B, C-50C, and C-50D
C-51
One impressed aircraft originally ordered by Canadian Colonial Airlines, with starboard-side door
C-52
DC-3A aircraft with R-1830 engines, five impressed as C-52, C-52A, C-52B, C-52C, and C-52D
C-68
Two DC-3As impressed with 21-seat interiors
C-84
One impressed DC-3B aircraft
Dakota II
British Royal Air Force designation for impressed DC-3s
LXD1
A single DC-3 supplied for evaluation by the Imperial Japanese Navy Air Service (IJNAS)
R4D-2
Two Eastern Air Lines DC-3-388s impressed into United States Navy (USN) service as VIP transports, later designated R4D-2F and later R4D-2Z
R4D-4
Ten DC-3As impressed for use by the USN
R4D-4R
Seven DC-3s impressed as staff transports for the USN
R4D-4Q
Radar countermeasures version of R4D-4 for the USN
XCG-17
Experimental assault glider, one converted

=== Conversions ===
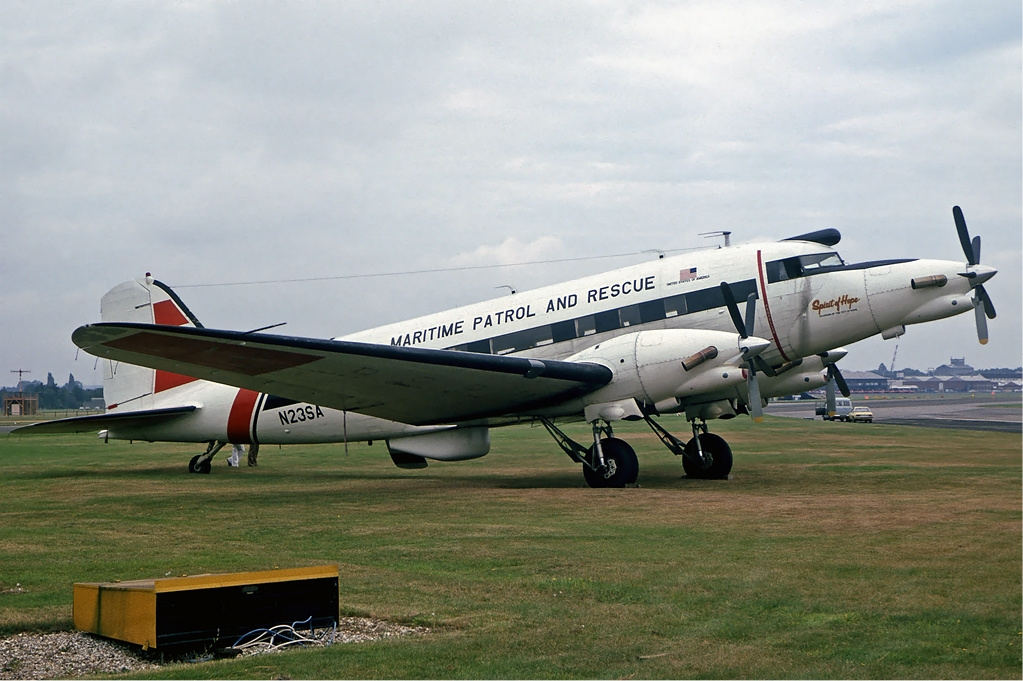
The only example of the Conroy Tri-Turbo-Three at the 1978 Farnborough Airshow. This aircraft saw service in both the Arctic and Antarctica

Dart-Dakota
for BEA test services, powered by two Rolls-Royce Dart turboprop engines
Mamba-Dakota
A single conversion for the Ministry of Supply, powered by two Armstrong-Siddeley Mamba turboprop engines
Airtech DC-3/2000
DC-3/C-47 engine conversion by Airtech Canada, first offered in 1987. Powered by two PZL ASz-62IT radial engines.
Basler BT-67
DC-3/C-47 conversion with a stretched fuselage, strengthened structure, modern avionics, and powered by two Pratt & Whitney Canada PT-6A-67R turboprop engines
BSAS C-47TP Turbo Dakota
A South African C-47 conversion for the South African Air Force by Braddick Specialised Air Services, with two Pratt & Whitney Canada PT6A-65R turboprop engines, revised systems, stretched fuselage, and modern avionics
Conroy Turbo-Three
One DC-3/C-47 converted by Conroy Aircraft with two Rolls-Royce Dart Mk. 510 turboprop engines
Conroy Super-Turbo-Three
Same as the Turbo Three but converted from a Super DC-3 (one converted)
Conroy Tri-Turbo-Three
Conroy Turbo Three further modified by the removal of the two Rolls-Royce Dart engines and their replacement by three Pratt & Whitney Canada PT6s (one mounted on each wing and one in the nose)
Greenwich Aircraft Corp Turbo Dakota DC-3
DC-3/C-47 conversion with a stretched fuselage, strengthened wing center section, updated systems, and powered by two Pratt & Whitney Canada PT6A-65AR turboprop engines
TS-62
Douglas-built C-47s fitted with Russian Shvetsov ASh-62 radial engines after World War II due to shortage of American engines in the Soviet Union. Some TS-62s featured a small extra cockpit window on the left side.
TS-82
Similar to TS-62, but with 1,650 horsepower (1,230 kW) Shvetsov ASh-82 radial engines.
USAC DC-3 Turbo Express
A turboprop conversion by the United States Aircraft Corporation, fitting Pratt & Whitney Canada PT6A-45R turboprop engines with an extended forward fuselage to maintain center of mass. First flight of the prototype conversion, (N300TX), was on July 29, 1982.

=== Military and foreign derivatives ===
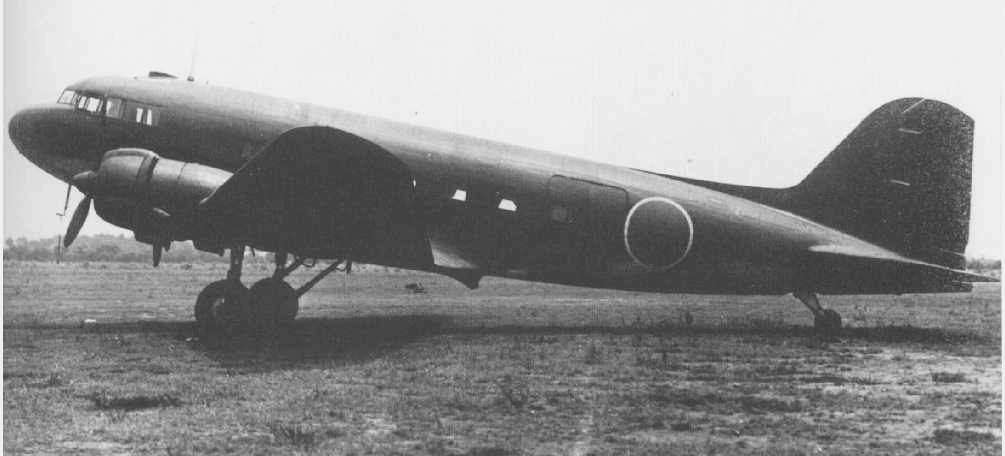
Nakajima L2D in Japanese markings, showing engine and cockpit glazing differences on later variants

Douglas C-47 Skytrain and C-53 Skytrooper
Production military DC-3A variants
Showa and Nakajima L2D
Developments manufactured under license in Japan by Nakajima and Showa for the IJNAS; 487 built
Lisunov Li-2 and PS-84
Developments manufactured under license in the USSR; 4,937 built

== Aircraft on display ==
While DC-3 conversions of airframes originally built as military aircraft exist in large numbers, few original DC-3s survive.

- A DC-3 that was delivered to United Airlines in December 1936 is in the collection of the Science and Innovation Park of the Science Museum, located at the former airbase RAF Wroughton in the United Kingdom.
- The oldest airworthy DC-3 is Flagship Detroit, which was delivered to American Airlines in March 1937. Its home base is the Mid America Flight Museum in Mount Pleasant, Texas.
- A DC-3 that was delivered to Dutch airline Koninklijke Luchtvaart Maatschappi (KLM) in April 1937 is on static display at the Queensland Air Museum at Caloundra Airport north of Brisbane, Australia.
- A DC-3 that was delivered to Eastern Air Lines in 1937 is on static display at the National Air and Space Museum in Washington, D.C.
- A DC-3 that was delivered to Australian National Airways in 1938 is maintained in airworthy condition at Melbourne Airport and flown at airshows in Australia.
- Delta Ship 41 is a DC-3 that was delivered to Delta Air Lines in 1940. It is on display at the Delta Flight Museum in Atlanta, Georgia.
- A DC-3 that was originally built for American Airlines but was delivered to the United States Army Air Forces in August 1941 as a C-50 is on static display at the Australian National Aviation Museum at Moorabbin Airport in Melbourne.

== Specifications (DC-3A-S1C3G) ==
3-view line drawing of the Douglas DC-3

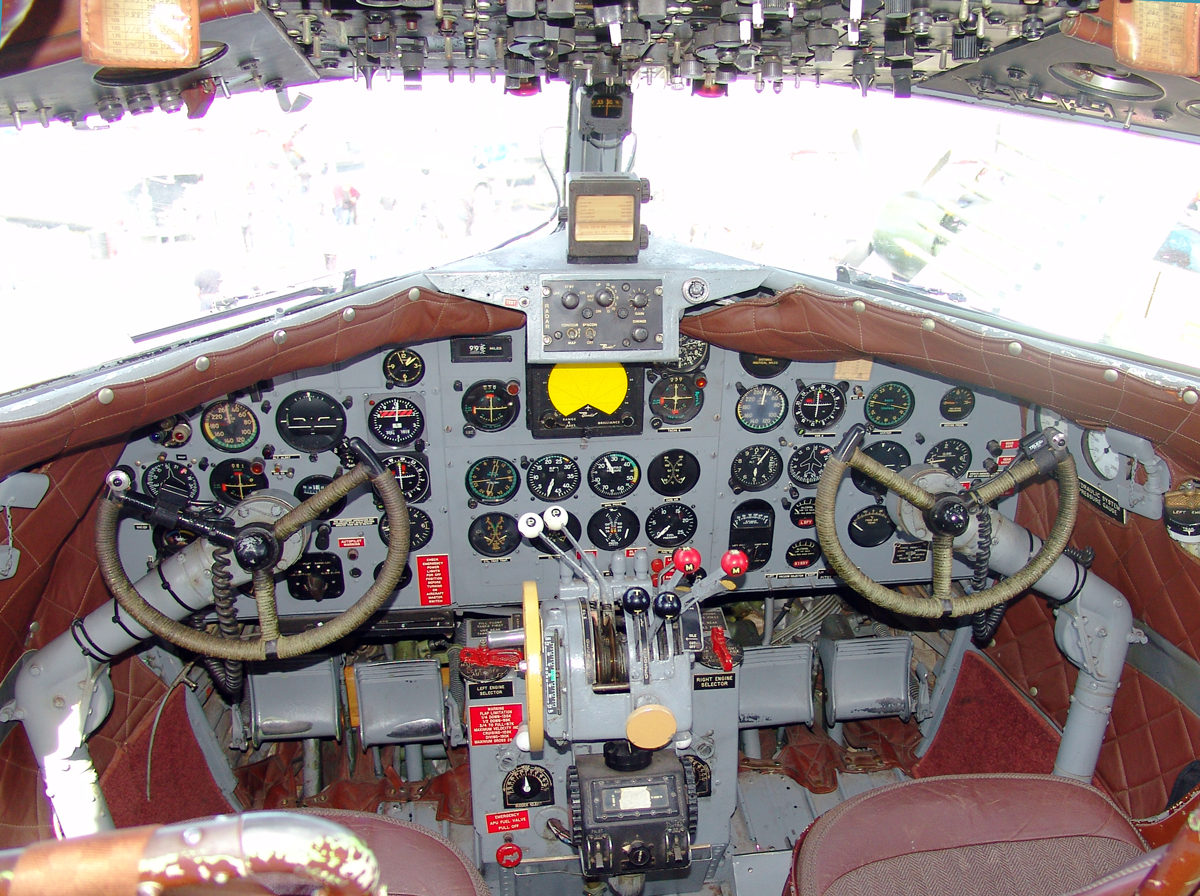
DC-3 cockpit

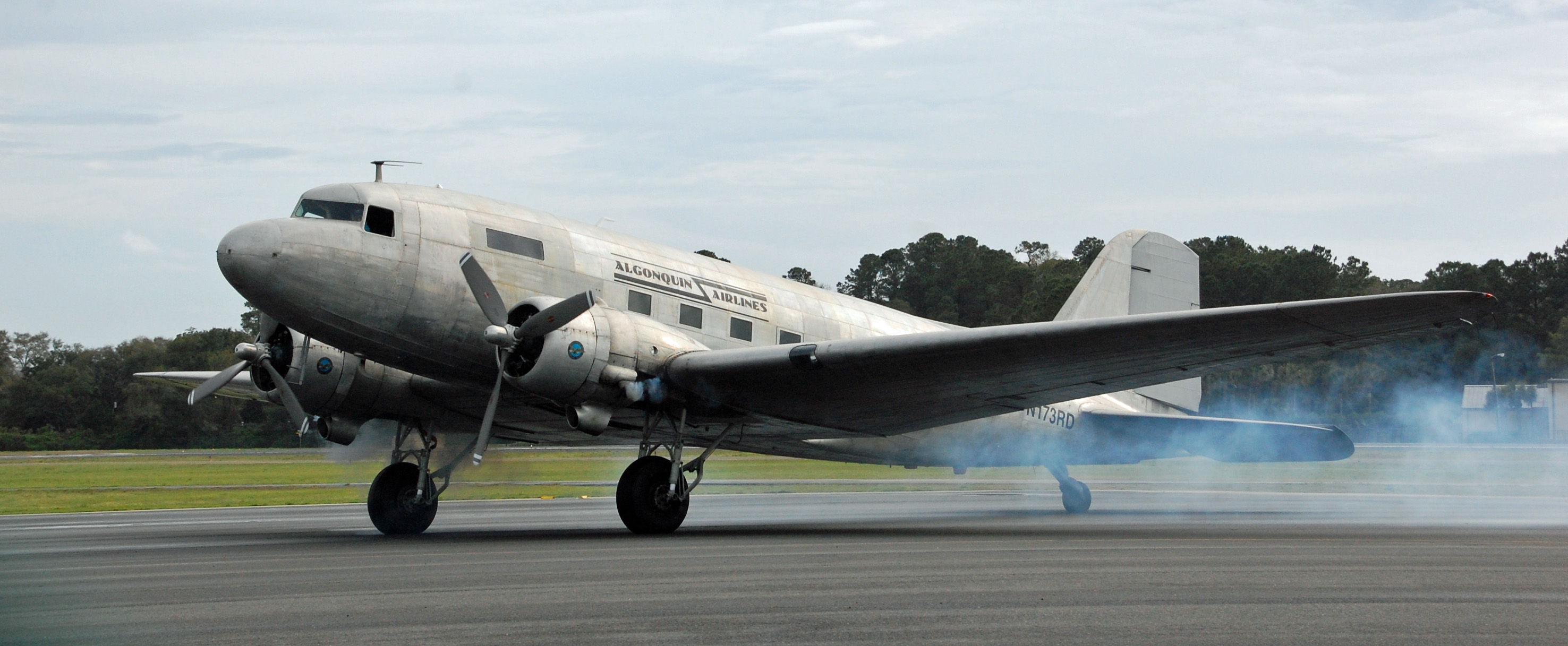

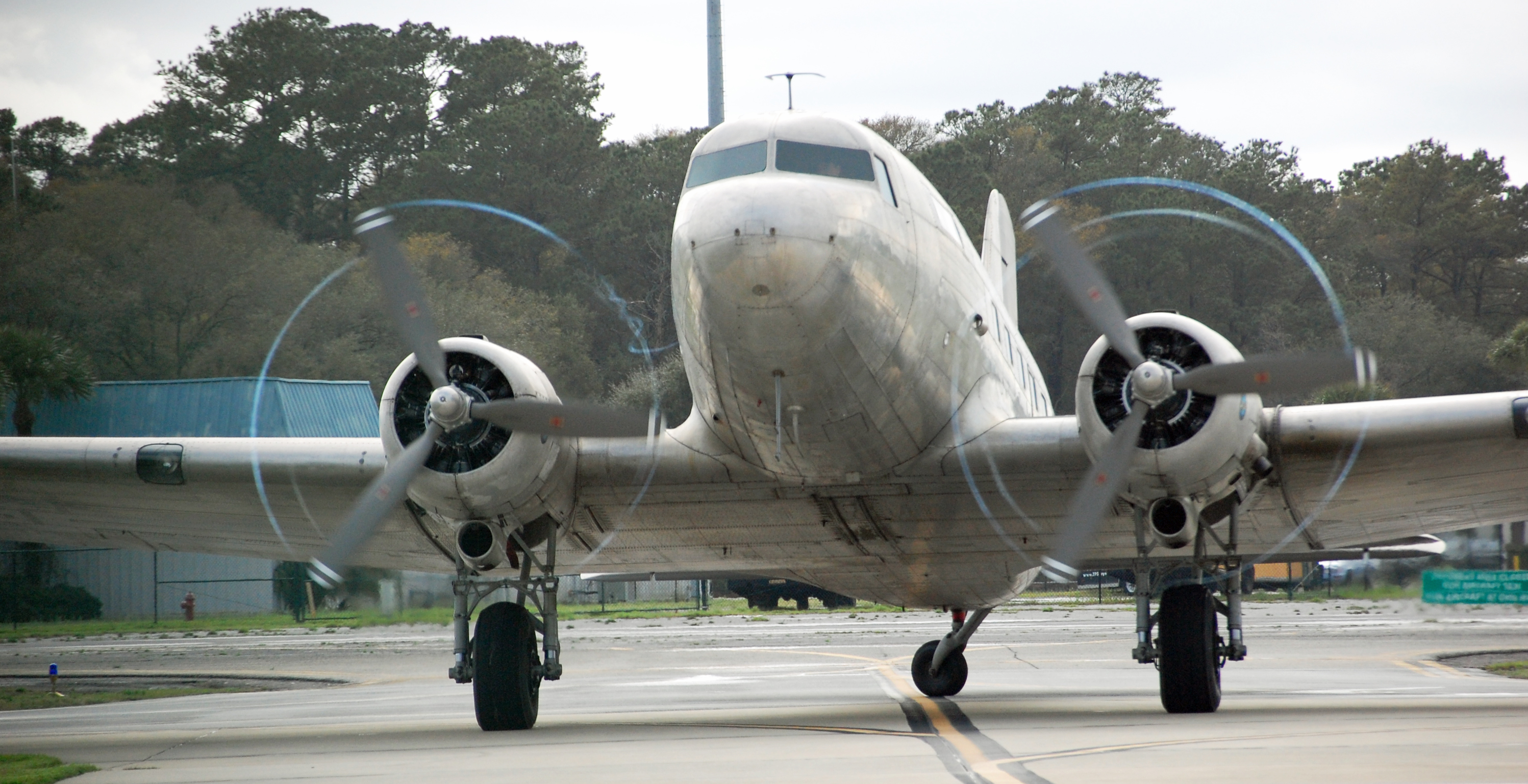
A 1944 Douglas DC-3C starting its engines and taxiing with its tail wheel unlocked

Data from McDonnell Douglas Aircraft since 1920

General characteristics

- Crew: two
- Capacity: 21–32 passengers
- Length: 64 ft 5 in (19.7 m)
- Wingspan: 95 ft 0 in (29.0 m)
- Height: 16 ft 9 in (5.16 m) (level attitude) 23 ft 6 in
- Wing area: 987 sq ft (91.7 m^{2})
- Aspect ratio: 9.17
- Airfoil: NACA2215 / NACA2206
- Empty weight: 16,865 lb (7,650 kg)
- Gross weight: 25,200 lb (11,431 kg) payload w/full fuel, 3,446 lb
- Fuel capacity: 822 US gal (3,111.6 L)
- Powerplant: 2 × Pratt & Whitney R-1830-S1C3G Twin Wasp 14-cyl. air-cooled two row radial piston engine, 1,200 hp (890 kW) each
- Propellers: 3-bladed Hamilton Standard 23E50 series, 11 ft 6 in (3.5 m) diameter hydraulically controlled constant speed, feathering

Performance

- Maximum speed: 223 kn (257 mph, 413 km/h) at 8,500 ft (2,590 m)
- Cruise speed: 183 kn (211 mph, 339 km/h)
- Stall speed: 68.0 kn (78.2 mph, 125.9 km/h)
- Never exceed speed: 223 kn (257 mph, 413 km/h)
- Minimum control speed: 77 kn (89 mph, 143 km/h) with one engine inoperative
- Range: 1,370 nmi (1,580 mi, 2,540 km) (maximum fuel, 3500 lb payload), cruise speed/range at 10,000 ft ASL, cruise fuel consumption of 94 gph at 50% power, 157kt IAS, 1,740 nm
- Service ceiling: 23,200 ft (7,100 m) , with one engine operative, 9,000 ft
- Rate of climb: 1,140 ft/min (5.8 m/s) , rate of climb at sea level with one engine operative, 200 fpm
- Wing loading: 25.5 lb/sq ft (125 kg/m^{2})
- Power/mass: 0.0952 hp/lb (156.5 W/kg)

== Notable appearances in media ==
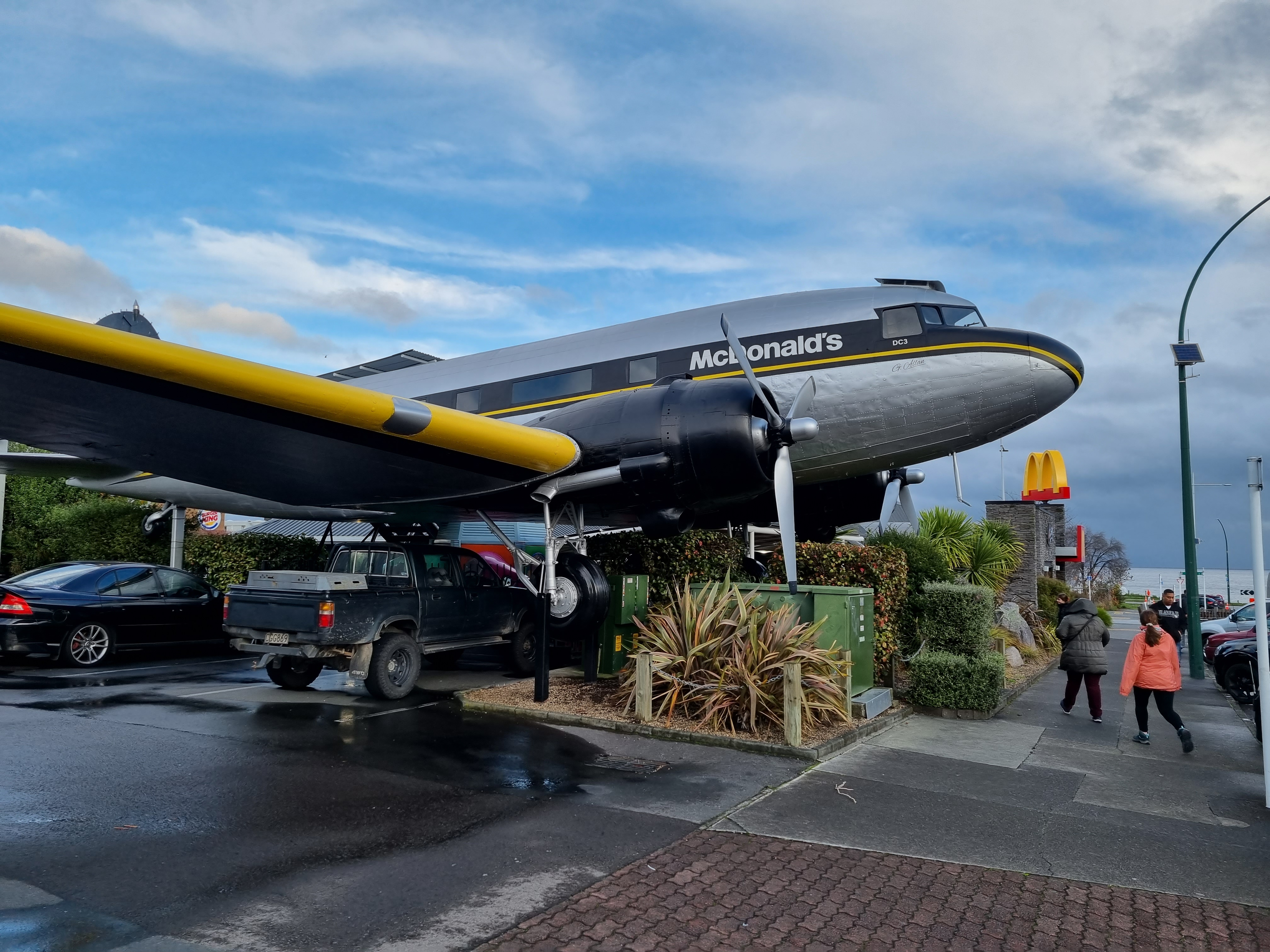
A retired DC-3 was used as part of a McDonald's restaurant in New Zealand.

Due to the large number produced; Golden Age of Aviation and World War II significance; and nearly a century of service in passenger, cargo, and military roles throughout the world; the aircraft maintains significant popular interest and has appeared in numerous works of fiction.

== See also ==
Related development

- Basler BT-67
- Douglas AC-47 Spooky
- Douglas C-47 Skytrain
- Douglas R4D-8/C-117D
- Douglas DC-2
- Lisunov Li-2
- Showa/Nakajima L2D
- Conroy Turbo-Three
- Conroy Tri-Turbo-Three

Aircraft of comparable role, configuration, and era

- Boeing 247
- Curtiss C-46 Commando
- Douglas DC-5
- Focke-Wulf Fw 206
- Junkers Ju 52
- Lockheed Model 18 Lodestar
- Saab 90 Scandia
- Vickers VC.1 Viking

Related lists

- List of aircraft of World War II
- List of civil aircraft

== Bibliography ==
- Bowers, P.M. The DC-3: 50 years of legendary flight. TAB Books Inc. Blue Ridge Summit. 1986
- Francillon, René. McDonnell Douglas Aircraft Since 1920: Volume I. Putnam. London. 1979. ISBN 0-87021-428-4.
- Gradidge, Jennifer M., ed. (1984). The Douglas DC 3 and its predecessors. Tonbridge (Kent): Air-Britain (Historians).
- Gradidge, Jennifer M., ed. (2006). The Douglas DC-1, DC-2 and DC-3:The First Seventy Years. Tonbridge (Kent): Air-Britain (Historians). ISBN 0-85130-332-3.
- Gradidge, Jennifer M. The Douglas DC-1/DC-2/DC-3 : The First Seventy Years, Volumes One and Two. Tonbridge, Kent, UK. Air-Britain (Historians) Ltd., 2006. ISBN 0-85130-332-3.
- Holden, Henry M. The Doulas DC-3. TAB Books. Blue Ridge Summit, Pennsylvania. 1991. ISBN 0-8306-3450-9.
- Kaplan, Philip. Legend: A Celebration of the Douglas DC-3/C-47/Dakota. Peter Livanos & Philip Kaplan, 2009. ISBN 978-0-9557061-1-0.
- Douglas DC-3. Historic Commercial Aircraft Series, Vol 13. Stamford, Lincs, UK: Key Publishing. 2023. ISBN 9781802823707.
- O'Leary, Michael. DC-3 and C-47 Gooney Birds. Motorbooks International. St. Paul, Minnesota. 1992. ISBN 0-87938-543-X.
- O'Leary, Michael. When Fords Ruled the Sky (Part Two). Air Classics, Volume 42, No. 5, May 2006.
- Pearcy, Arthur. Douglas DC-3 Survivors, Volume 1. Aston Publications. Bourne End, Bucks, UK. 1987. ISBN 0-946627-13-4.
- Pearcy, Arthur. Douglas Propliners: DC-1–DC-7. Airlife Publishing. Shrewsbury, UK. 1995. ISBN 1-85310-261-X.
- Reinhard, Martin A. (January–February 2004). "Talkback". Air Enthusiast. No. 109. p. 74. ISSN 0143-5450.
- Taylor, John W. R. Jane's All the World's Aircraft, 1982–83. Jane's Publishing Company. London. 1983. ISBN 0-7106-0748-2.
- Wulf, Herman de (August–November 1990). "An Airline at War". Air Enthusiast (13): 72–77. ISSN 0143-5450.
- Yenne, Bill. McDonnell Douglas: A Tale of Two Giants. Bison Books. Greenwich, Connecticut. 1985. ISBN 0-517-44287-6.
